= Second Chechen War =

1999–2009 war in the Caucasus region

- Part of the Chechen–Russian conflict and the Post-Soviet conflicts
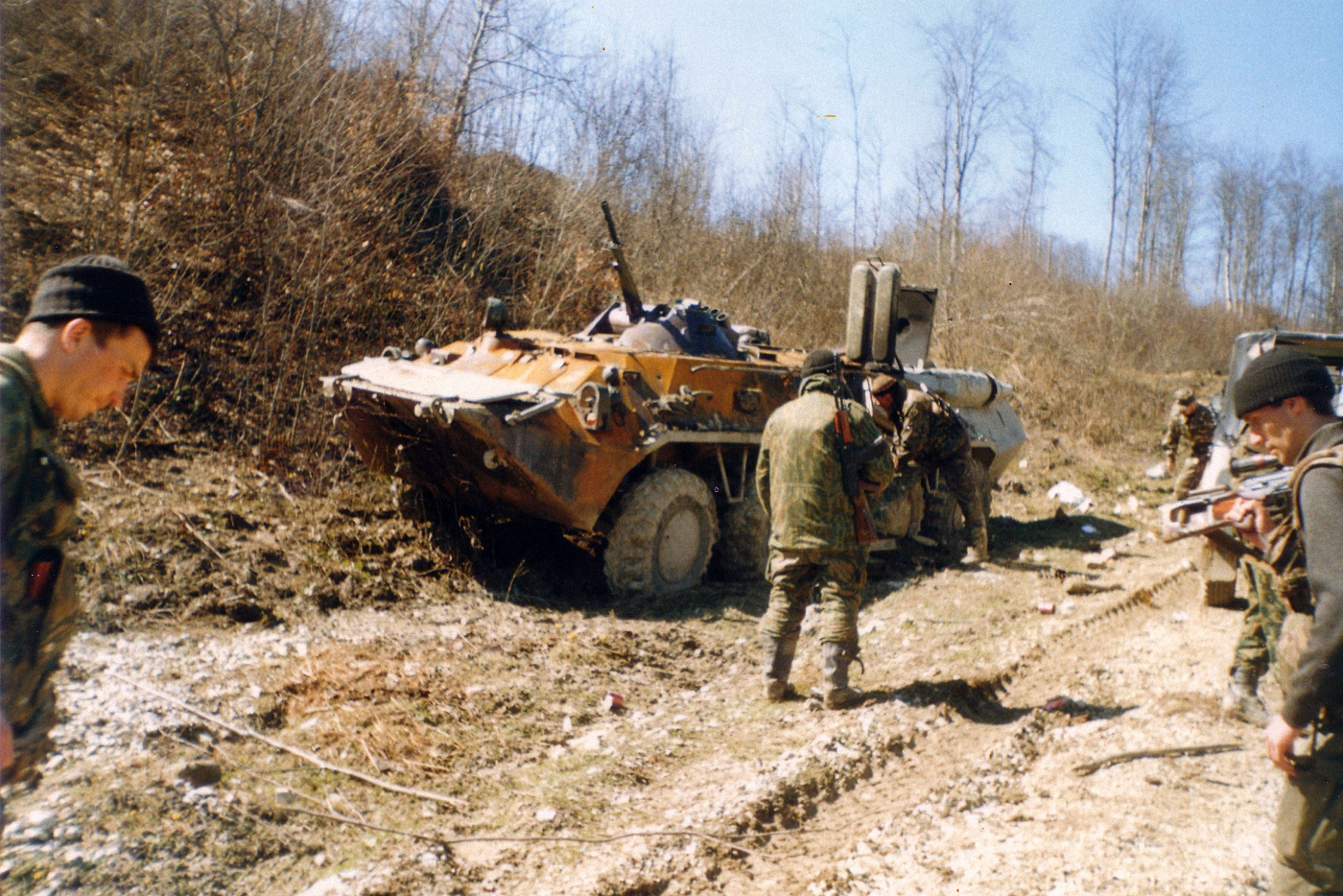
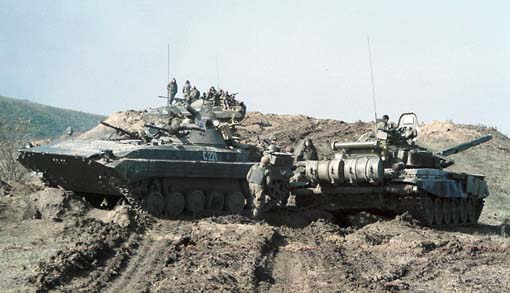
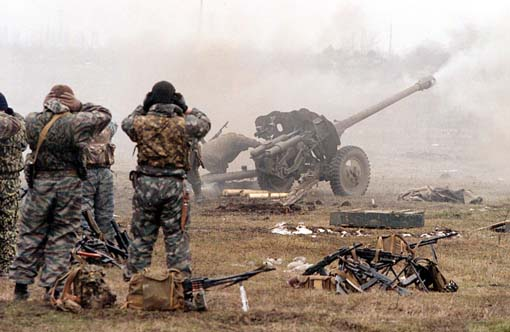
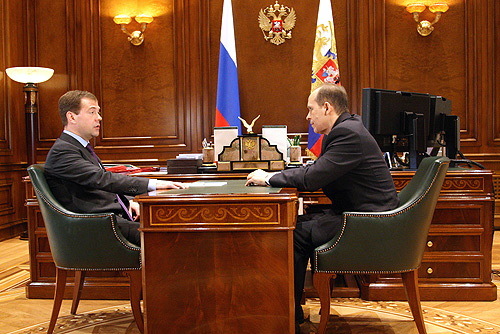
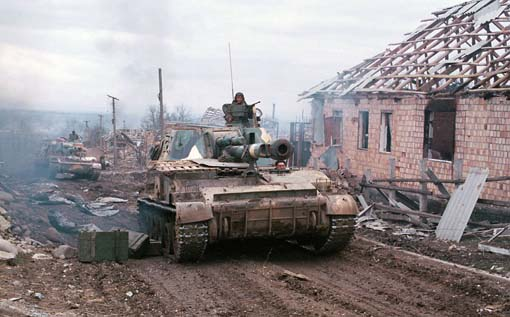
- From top to bottom, left to right: (Note: BTR-80 armored personnel carrier disabled by militants during the 2000 Zhani-Vedeno ambush; Russian troops en route to Grozny on 18 November 1999; Russian troops firing their artillery from Achkhoy-Martan on 2 December 1999; Russian president Dmitry Medvedev meets FSB director Alexander Bortnikov in March 2009 to discuss the end of counter-terrorism operations inside Chechnya; Russian 2S3 Akatsiya self-propelled gun enters Komsomolskoye village)
Date	Main phase: 7 August 1999 – 30 April 2000 (8 months and 24 days); Insurgency phase: 1 May 2000 – 16 April 2009 (8 years, 11 months and 15 days)
Location	North and South Caucasus
Result	Russian victory
Territorial changes	Chechnya reincorporated into Russia

Belligerents
Russia; Provisional Council (until 2000); Chechen Republic (from 2000)	Chechen Republic of Ichkeria (1999–2007); Caucasian Front (2005–2007); See full list: Caucasus Emirate (2007–2009); North Caucasian volunteers; Mujahideen; Grey Wolves

Commanders and leaders
(Russia) Boris Yeltsin (Note: Until 31 December 1999.); (Russia) Vladimir Putin (Note: From 31 December 1999 until 7 May 2008.); (Russia) Dmitry Medvedev (Note: From 7 May 2008.); (Russia) Igor Sergeyev; (Russia) Anatoly Kvashnin; Akhmad Kadyrov X; See full list: (Russia) Vladimir Shamanov; (Russia) Viktor Kazantsev; (Russia) Nikolai Patrushev; (Russia) Gennady Troshev Killed generals: (Russia) German Ugryumov †; (Russia) Mikhail Malofeev †; (Russia) Mikhail Rudchenko †; (Russia) Nikolai Garidov †; (Russia) Igor Shifrin †; (Russia) Pavel Varfolomeev †; (Russia) Gennady Shpigun (POW); (Russia) Alexandr Otrakovsky †; (Russia) Stanislav Korovinsky †; (Russia) Gaidar Gadzhiyev † Pro-Russian Chechens: Ramzan Kadyrov; Alu Alkhanov; Ruslan Yamadayev X; Sulim Yamadayev X; Said-Magomed Kakiyev; Adam Delimkhanov; Buvadi Dakhiyev †; Apti Alaudinov	Aslan Maskhadov †; Abdul Halim Sadulayev †; (Chechen Republic of Ichkeria) Shamil Basayev †; (Chechen Republic of Ichkeria) Ruslan Gelayev †; Dokka Umarov; See full list: (Chechen Republic of Ichkeria) Zelimkhan Yandarbiyev X; (Chechen Republic of Ichkeria) Akhmed Zakayev; (Chechen Republic of Ichkeria) Aslanbek Ismailov †; (Chechen Republic of Ichkeria) Vakha Arsanov (POW); (Chechen Republic of Ichkeria) Aslambek Abdulkhadzhiev †; (Chechen Republic of Ichkeria) Ramzan Akhmadov †; (Chechen Republic of Ichkeria) Rizvan Akhmadov †; (Chechen Republic of Ichkeria) Zelimkhan Akhmadov X; (Chechen Republic of Ichkeria) Khunkar-Pasha Israpilov †; (Chechen Republic of Ichkeria) Isa Astamirov †; (Chechen Republic of Ichkeria) Aydamir Abalayev †; (Chechen Republic of Ichkeria) Akhmad Avdorkhanov †; (Chechen Republic of Ichkeria) Ruslan Alikhadzhiyev (POW); (Chechen Republic of Ichkeria) Turpal-Ali Atgeriyev (POW); (Chechen Republic of Ichkeria) Lechi Dudayev †; (Chechen Republic of Ichkeria) Arbi Barayev † After 2006: (Chechen Republic of Ichkeria) Khuseyn Gakayev; (Chechen Republic of Ichkeria) Aslambek Vadalov; (Chechen Republic of Ichkeria) Aslan Byutukayev; (Chechen Republic of Ichkeria) Supyan Abdullayev; (Chechen Republic of Ichkeria) Tarkhan Gaziyev Arab Mujahideen: Ibn al-Khattab X; Abu al-Walid †

Strength
Russian claim: 80,000 (in 1999); Chechen claim: 462,000	Russian claim: 22,000; Chechen claim: 9,000 (in 1999); 7,000 (in 2000)

Casualties and losses
Total: 6,000–14,000; See full list: Russian military data: 6,000–6,300 soldiers killed; 1,072 Chechen police officers killed Chechen claim: 2,004 killed (1999 – May 2000) Independent estimates: 9,000–11,000+ killed (1999-Feb. 2002; Janes); 5,810 killed (Aug. 2002-Aug. 2003; IISS + CSIS) 14,000 killed (1999 – March 2005; Committee of Soldiers' Mothers)	Total: 3,500–14,000+; See full list: Chechen claim: 3,500+ killed (1999–2004) Russian military data: 14,113 killed (Note: Excluding foreign volunteers) (1999–2002); 2,186 killed (2003–2009); 6,295 captured (2003–2009)
- Total killed military & civilian: 50,000–80,000 See full list: Estimate total number of casualties: 30,000 civilians dead (25,000 killed and 5,000 missing) according to Amnesty International; ~80,000 killed in Chechnya (GfbV estimate); More in neighbouring regions: 40,000–50,000 civilians killed (Kramer); More than 600 killed during attacks in Russia proper

The Second Chechen War (Russian: Втора́я чече́нская война́, (Note: The entirety of 1994—2017 conflict in Chechnya and some other North Caucasus regions in general is officially known as counter-terrorist operations on the territory of North Caucasus (Russian: контртеррористические операции на территории Северо-Кавказского региона)) Chechen: Шолгӏа оьрсийн-нохчийн тӏом, lit. 'Second Russian-Chechen War') took place in Chechnya and the border regions of the North Caucasus between the Russian Federation and the breakaway Chechen Republic of Ichkeria, from August 1999 to April 2009.

In August 1999, Islamists from Chechnya infiltrated Dagestan in Russia. Later in September, apartment bombings occurred in Russian cities, killing over 300 people. Russian authorities were quick to blame Chechens for the bombings, although no Chechen, field commander or otherwise, took responsibility for the attacks. During the initial campaign, Russian military and pro-Russian Chechen paramilitary forces faced Chechen separatists in open combat and seized the Chechen capital Grozny after a winter siege that lasted from December 1999 until February 2000. Russia established direct rule over Chechnya in May 2000, although Chechen militant resistance throughout the North Caucasus region continued to inflict many Russian casualties and challenge Russian political control over Chechnya for several years. Both sides carried out attacks against civilians. These attacks drew international condemnation.

In mid-2000, the Russian government transferred certain military responsibilities to pro-Russian Chechen forces. The military phase of operations was terminated in April 2002, and the coordination of the field operations was given first to the Federal Security Service and then to the Ministry of Internal Affairs in mid-2003.

By 2009, Russia had disabled the Chechen separatist movement, and mass fighting ceased. Russian army and Interior Ministry troops ceased patrolling. Grozny underwent reconstruction, and much of the city and surrounding areas were rebuilt quickly. Sporadic violence continued in the North Caucasus; occasional bombings and ambushes against federal troops and forces of the regional governments in the area still occur.

In April 2009, the government operation in Chechnya officially ended. As the bulk of the army was withdrawn, responsibility for dealing with the low-level insurgency was shouldered by the local police force. Three months later, the exiled leader of the separatist government, Akhmed Zakayev, called for a halt to armed resistance against the Chechen police force from August. This marked the end of the Second Chechen War. The death toll of the conflict is unknown, but the total loss of human life, including combatants and non-combatants, is estimated to be over 60,000.

== Names ==
The Second Chechen War is also known as the Second Chechen Campaign (Russian: Втора́я чече́нская кампа́ния) or the Second Russian Invasion of Chechnya from the Chechen insurgents' point of view. (Note: Known officially from the Russian point of view as "Counter-terrorist operations on territories of North Caucasian region" (Russian: Контртеррористические операции на территории Северо-Кавказского региона).)

== Historical basis of the conflict ==
=== Russian Empire ===
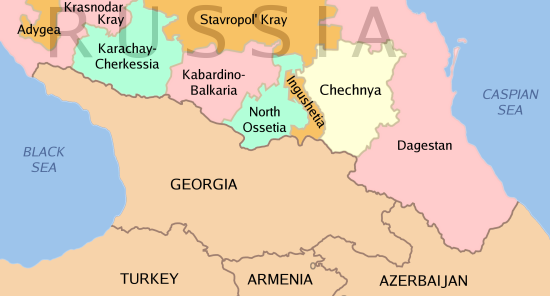
Chechnya and the Caucasus region

Chechnya is an area in the Northern Caucasus which has constantly fought against foreign rule, including the Ottoman Turks in the 15th century. The Russian Terek Cossack Host was established in lowland Chechnya in 1577 by free Cossacks who were resettled from the Volga to the Terek River. In 1783, the Russian Empire and the Georgian Kingdom of Kartli-Kakheti signed the Treaty of Georgievsk, under which Kartli-Kakheti became a Russian protectorate. To secure communications with Georgia and other regions of the Transcaucasia, the Russian Empire began spreading its influence into the Caucasus region, starting the Caucasus War in 1817. Russian forces first moved into highland Chechnya in 1830, and the conflict in the area lasted until 1859, when a 250,000-strong army under General Aleksandr Baryatinsky broke down the highlanders' resistance. Frequent uprisings in the Caucasus also occurred during the Russo–Turkish War of 1877–78.

=== Soviet Union ===
Following the Russian Revolution of 1917, Chechens established a short-lived Caucasian Imamate which included parts of Chechnya, Dagestan and Ingushetia; there was also the secular pan-Caucasian Mountainous Republic of the Northern Caucasus. Most of the resistance was defeated by Bolshevik troops by 1922. Then, months before the creation of the Soviet Union, the Chechen Autonomous Oblast of the Russian SFSR was established. It annexed a part of the territory of the former Terek Cossack Host. Chechnya and neighboring Ingushetia formed the Checheno–Ingush Autonomous Soviet Socialist Republic in 1936. In 1941, during World War II, a small-scale Chechen revolt broke out, led by Hasan Israilov. In 1944, the entire Chechen people were deported to the Kazakh SSR and Kirghiz SSR in an act of ethnic cleansing; this was done under the false pretext of Chechen mass collaboration with Nazi Germany. An estimated 1/4 to 1/3 of the Chechen population perished due to the harsh conditions. Many scholars recognize the deportation as an act of genocide, as did the European Parliament in 2004. In 1992 the separatist government built a memorial dedicated to the victims of the acts of 1944. The pro-Russian government would later demolish this memorial. Tombstones which were an integral part of the memorial were found planted on the Akhmad Kadyrov Square next to granite steles honoring the losses of the local pro-Russian power.

=== First Chechen War ===
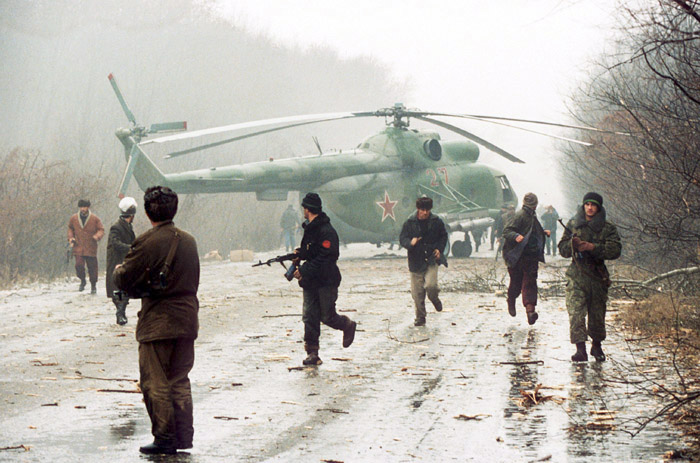
A Russian helicopter downed by Chechen militants near the capital Grozny, during the First Chechen War

During the dissolution of the Soviet Union in 1991, there was an anti-Soviet revolution in Chechnya, which ultimately led to Chechnya declaring independence. In 1992, Chechen and Ingush leaders signed an agreement splitting the joint Checheno–Ingush republic in two, with Ingushetia joining the Russian Federation and Chechnya remaining independent. The tension between Chechnya and Russia over independence ultimately led to Russian intervention in the republic, in which the Russians covertly tried to oust the government of Dzhokhar Dudayev. The First Chechen War began in 1994, when Russian forces entered Chechnya on the premise of restoring constitutional order. Following nearly two years of brutal fighting, with a death toll exceeding 100,000 by some estimates, the 1996 Khasavyurt ceasefire agreement was signed and Russian troops were withdrawn from the republic.

== Prelude to the Second Chechen War ==
=== Instability in Chechnya ===
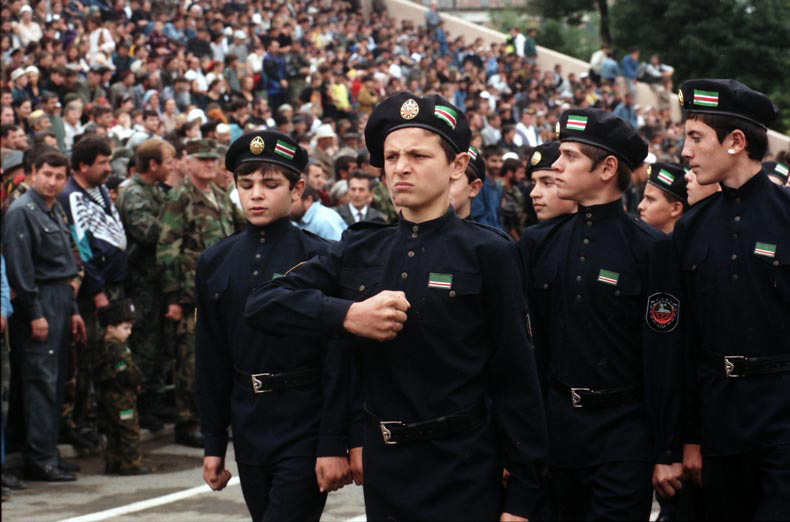
Cadets of the Ichkeria Chechen National Guard, 1999

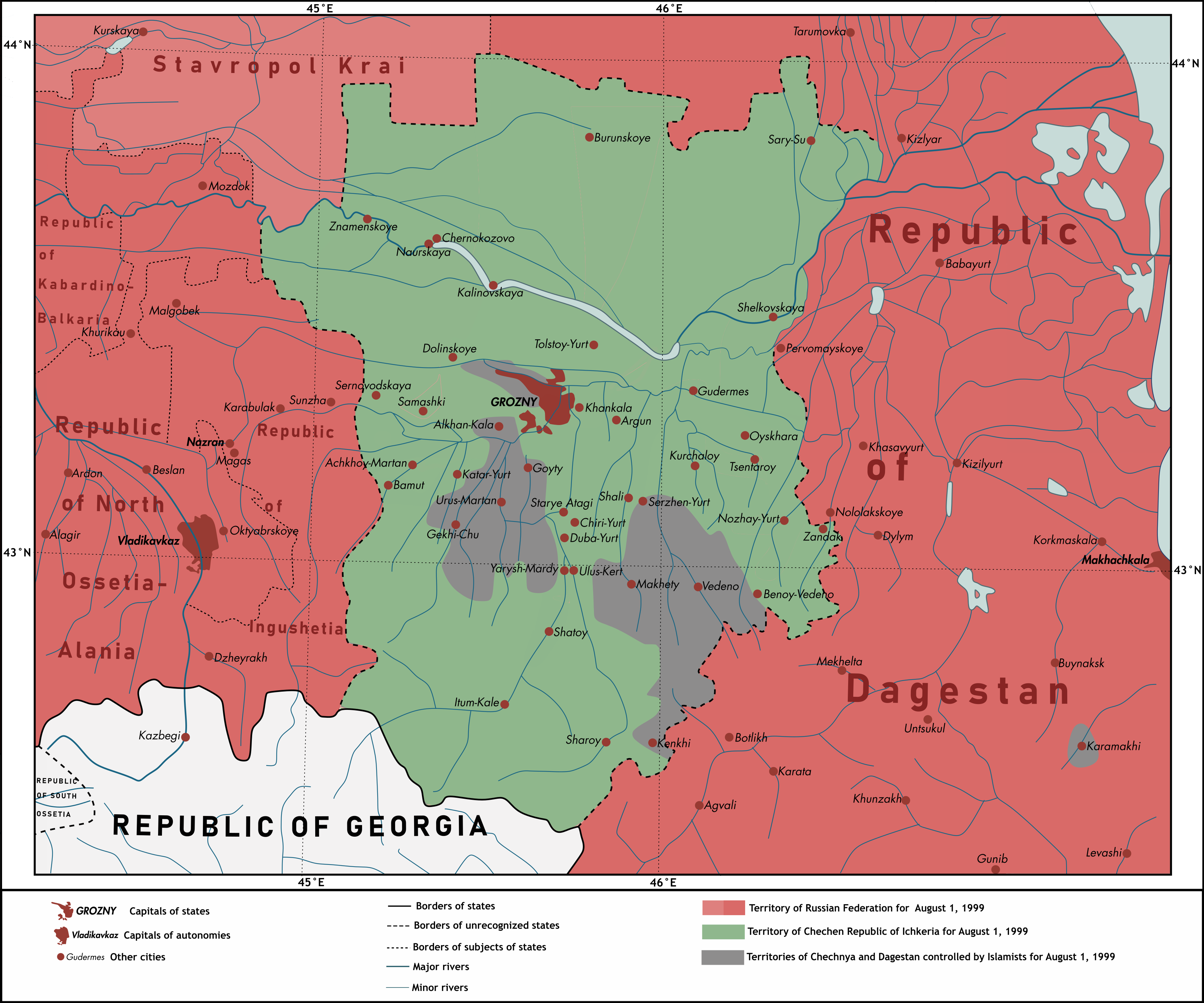
Situation in Chechnya in the period between the end of the First Chechen War and the beginning of the Second Chechen War: In red the territory under the control of the Russian Federation, in green the territory under the control of the Chechen Republic of Ichkeria and in grey the areas under the control of the Islamists.

The authority of the government in Grozny was opposed by extremist warlords like Arbi Barayev, who, according to some sources, was in cooperation with the FSB. Kidnapping in Chechnya reached large proportions, and the total turnover reached tens of millions of dollars. In 1998, a group of four Western hostages was murdered. Russian special services were accused of being involved in kidnappings. In 1998, a state of emergency was declared by the authorities in Grozny. In July 1998, a confrontation occurred in Gudermes between Chechen National Guard troops and a fundamentalist faction, leading to many casualties.

Some scholars linked Chechen resistance to Russia to the Al-Qaeda global jihad movement. According to Gordon Hahn, the connections between the Chechen Republic of Ichkeria and Al-Qaeda "were common knowledge by the late 1990s among U.S. government officials, intelligence analysts, and terrorism experts" and there were about five hundred foreign jihad fighters in Chechnya at the start of the second war. Most Western observers prior to 11 September regarded the alleged al-Qaida links claimed by the Russian government with skepticism. The Clinton and Bush administrations, as well as other NATO governments, uniformly dismissed Moscow's rhetoric concerning the existence of Chechens in Afghanistan and Afghans in Chechnya as Soviet-style "agitprop" (agitation-propaganda) until 11 September occurred.

=== Russian–Chechen relations (1996–1999) ===
Political tensions were fueled in part by allegedly Chechen or pro-Chechen terrorist and criminal activity in Russia, as well as by border clashes. On 16 November 1996, in Kaspiysk (Dagestan), a bomb destroyed an apartment building housing Russian border guards, killing 68 people. The cause of the blast was never determined, but many in Russia blamed Chechen separatists. Three people died on 23 April 1997, when a bomb exploded in the Russian railway station of Armavir (Krasnodar Krai), and two on 28 May 1997, when another bomb exploded in the Russian railway station of Pyatigorsk (Stavropol Krai). On 22 December 1997, forces of Dagestani militants and Chechnya-based Arab warlord Ibn al-Khattab raided the base of the 136th Motor Rifle Brigade of the Russian Army in Buynaksk, Dagestan, inflicting heavy casualties.

The 1997 election brought to power the separatist president Aslan Maskhadov. In 1998 and 1999, President Maskhadov survived several assassination attempts, blamed on the Russian intelligence services. In March 1999, General Gennady Shpigun, the Kremlin's envoy to Chechnya, was kidnapped at the airport in Grozny and ultimately found dead in 2000 during the war. On 7 March 1999, in response to the abduction of General Shpigun, Interior Minister Sergei Stepashin called for an invasion of Chechnya. However, Stepashin's plan was overridden by the prime minister, Yevgeny Primakov. Stepashin later said:

The decision to invade Chechnya was made in March 1999... I was prepared for an active intervention. We were planning to be on the north side of the Terek River by August–September [of 1999] This [the war] would happen regardless to the bombings in Moscow... Putin did not discover anything new. You can ask him about this. He was the director of FSB at this time and had all the information.

According to Robert Bruce Ware, these plans should be regarded as contingency plans. However, Stepashin did actively call for a military campaign against Chechen separatists in August 1999 when he was the prime minister of Russia. But shortly after his televised interview where he talked about plans to restore constitutional order in Chechnya, he was replaced in the PM's position by Vladimir Putin.

In late May 1999, Russia announced that it was closing the Russian-Chechnya border in an attempt to combat attacks and criminal activity; border guards were ordered to shoot suspects on sight. On 18 June 1999, seven servicemen were killed when Russian border guard posts were attacked in Dagestan. On 29 July 1999, the Russian Interior Ministry troops destroyed a Chechen border post near the city of Kizlyar and marched several kilometers into Chechnya. On 22 August 1999, 10 Russian policemen were killed by an anti-tank mine blast in North Ossetia, and, on 9 August 1999, six servicemen were kidnapped in the Ossetian capital Vladikavkaz.

=== Dagestan ===
On 7 August 1999, Shamil Basayev together with Ibn al-Khattab, led two groups of up to 2,000 Chechen, Dagestani, Arab mujahideen from Chechnya into the neighboring Republic of Dagestan. This war saw the first (unconfirmed) use by Russia of aerial-delivered fuel air explosives (FAE) in mountainous areas, notably in the village of Tando. By mid-September 1999, the militants were routed from the villages they had captured and retreated into Chechnya. According to Russia, several hundred militants were killed in the fighting and the Russian side reported 275 servicemen killed and approximately 900 wounded.

=== Russian apartment bombings ===
Before the wake of the Dagestani campaign had settled, a series of bombings took place in Russia (in Moscow, Volgodonsk and Buynaksk). On 4 September 1999, 62 people died in an apartment building housing members of families of Russian soldiers. Over the next two weeks, the bombs targeted three other apartment buildings and a mall; in total, over 350 people were killed. Then Prime Minister Putin quickly blamed the attacks on Chechen militants and despite no evidence linking the bombings to Chechens; ordered the bombing campaign of Chechnya. In February 2000, the US Secretary of State Madeleine Albright stated they had not seen any evidence that tied the bombings to Chechnya.

On 22 September 1999, Russian Federal Security Service (FSB) agents were caught by local police planting a bomb at an apartment complex in Ryazan. They were later released on orders from Moscow. FSB chief Nikolai Patrushev announced on television that the apparent bomb had been part of a "training exercise".

A Russian criminal investigation of the bombings was completed in 2002. The results of the investigation, and the court ruling that followed, concluded that they were organized by Achemez Gochiyaev, who remains at large, and ordered by Khattab and Abu Omar al-Saif (both of whom were later killed), in retaliation for the Russian counteroffensive against their incursion into Dagestan. Six other suspects have been convicted by Russian courts.

Many observers, including State Duma deputies Yuri Shchekochikhin, Sergei Kovalev and Sergei Yushenkov, cast doubts on the official version and sought an independent investigation. Some others, including David Satter, Yury Felshtinsky, Vladimir Pribylovsky and Alexander Litvinenko, as well as the secessionist Chechen authorities, claimed that the 1999 bombings were a false flag attack coordinated by the FSB in order to win public support for a new full-scale war in Chechnya, which boosted the popularity of Prime Minister and former FSB Director Vladimir Putin, brought the pro-war Unity Party to the State Duma in the 1999 parliamentary election, and secured Putin as president within a few months. A description of the bombings as FSB false-flag operations appears in the book Blowing Up Russia, which is banned in the Russian Federation.

== 1999–2000 Russian offensive ==
=== Air war ===
In late August and early September 1999, Russia mounted a massive aerial campaign over Chechnya, with the stated aim of wiping out militants who invaded Dagestan earlier in the same month. On 26 August 1999, Russia acknowledged bombing raids in Chechnya. The Russian air strikes were reported to have forced at least 100,000 Chechens to flee their homes to safety; the neighbouring region of Ingushetia was reported to have appealed for United Nations aid to deal with tens of thousands of refugees. On 2 October 1999, Russia's Ministry of Emergency Situations reported that 78,000 people had fled the air strikes in Chechnya; most of them went to Ingushetia, where they arrived at a rate of 5,000 to 6,000 a day.

As of 22 September 1999, Deputy Interior Minister Igor Zubov said that Russian troops had surrounded Chechnya and were prepared to retake the region, but the military planners were advising against a ground invasion because of the likelihood of heavy Russian casualties.

=== Land war ===
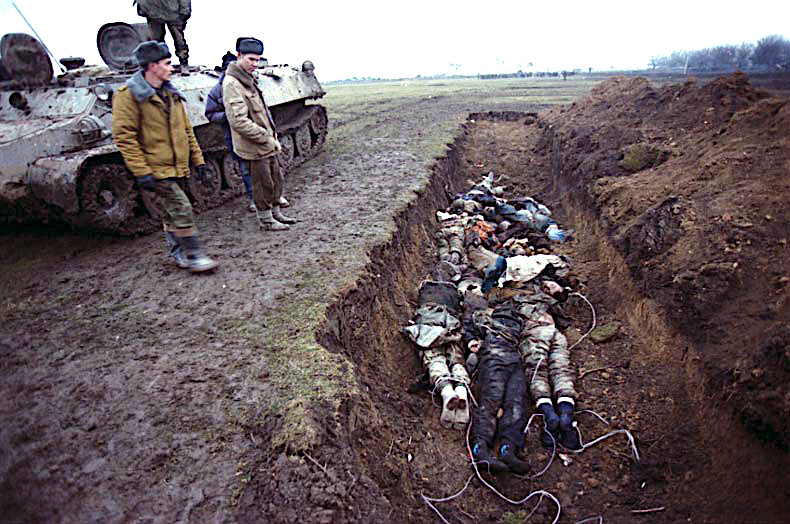
A mass grave in Chechnya

The Chechen conflict entered a new phase on 1 October 1999, when Russia's new prime minister Putin declared the authority of Maskhadov and his parliament illegitimate. At this time, Putin announced that Russian troops would initiate a land war but progress only as far as the Terek River, which cuts the northern third of Chechnya off from the rest of the republic. Putin's stated intention was to take control of Chechnya's northern plain and establish a cordon sanitaire against further Chechen aggression; he later recalled that the cordon alone was "pointless and technically impossible," apparently because of Chechnya's rugged terrain. According to Russian accounts, Putin accelerated a plan for a major crackdown against Chechnya that had been drawn up months earlier.

The Russian army moved with ease in the wide open spaces of northern Chechnya and reached the Terek River on 5 October 1999. On this day, a bus filled with refugees was reportedly hit by a Russian tank shell, killing at least 11 civilians; two days later, Russian Su-24 fighter bombers dropped cluster bombs on the village of Elistanzhi, killing some 35 people. On 10 October 1999, Maskhadov outlined a peace plan offering a crackdown on renegade warlords; the offer was rejected by the Russian side. He also appealed to NATO to help end fighting between his forces and Russian troops, without effect.

On 12 October 1999, the Russian forces crossed the Terek and began a two-pronged advance on the capital, Grozny to the south. Hoping to avoid the significant casualties that plagued the first Chechen War, the Russians advanced slowly and in force, making extensive use of artillery and air power in an attempt to soften Chechen defences. Many thousands of civilians fled the Russian advance, leaving Chechnya for neighbouring Russian republics. Their numbers were later estimated to reach 200,000 to 350,000, out of the approximately 800,000 residents of the Chechen Republic. The Russians appeared to be taking no chances with the Chechen population in its rear areas, setting up "filtration camps" in October in northern Chechnya for detaining suspected members of bandformirovaniya militant formations (literally: "bandit formations").

On 15 October 1999, Russian forces took control of a strategic ridge within artillery range of the Chechen capital, Grozny after mounting an intense tank and artillery barrage against Chechen fighters. In response, President Maskhadov declared a gazavat (holy war) to confront the approaching Russian army. Martial law was declared in Ichkeria, and reservists were called, but no martial law or state of emergency had been declared in Chechnya or Russia by the Russian government. The next day, Russian forces captured the strategic Tersky Heights, within sight of Grozny, dislodging 200 entrenched Chechen fighters. After heavy fighting, Russia seized the Chechen base in the village of Goragorsky, west of the city.

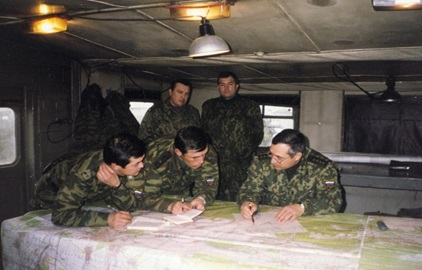
Chief of the General Staff Anatoly Kvashnin at the headquarters of the group "West" together with Valery Gerasimov and Alexei Kim, Urus-Martan, 2000.

On 21 October 1999, a Russian Scud short-range ballistic missile strike on the central Grozny marketplace killed more than 140 people, including many women and children, and left hundreds more wounded. A Russian spokesman said the busy market was targeted because it was used by separatists as an arms bazaar. Eight days later, Russian aircraft carried out a rocket attack on a large convoy of refugees heading into Ingushetia, killing at least 25 civilians including Red Cross workers and journalists. Two days later Russian forces conducted a heavy artillery and rocket attack on Samashki; some claimed that civilians were killed in Samashki in revenge for the heavy casualties suffered there by Russian forces during the first war.

On 12 November 1999, the Russian flag was raised over Chechnya's second largest city, Gudermes, when the local Chechen commanders, the Yamadayev brothers, defected to the federal side; the Russians also entered the bombed-out former Cossack village of Assinovskaya. The fighting in and around Kulary continued until January 2000. On 17 November 1999, Russian soldiers dislodged separatists in Bamut, the symbolic separatist stronghold in the first war; dozens of Chechen fighters and many civilians were reported killed, and the village was levelled in the FAE bombing. Two days later, after a failed attempt five days earlier, Russian forces managed to capture the village of Achkhoy-Martan.

On 26 November 1999, Deputy Army Chief of Staff Valery Manilov said that phase two of the Chechnya campaign was just about complete, and a final third phase was about to begin. According to Manilov, the third phase aimed to destroy "bandit groups" in the mountains. A few days later, Russia's Defense Minister Igor Sergeyev said Russian forces might need up to three more months to complete their military campaign in Chechnya, while some generals said the offensive could be over by New Year's Day. The next day, the Chechens briefly recaptured the town of Novogroznensky.

On 1 December 1999, after weeks of heavy fighting, Russian forces under Major General Vladimir Shamanov took control of Alkhan-Yurt, a village just south of Grozny. The Chechen and foreign fighters inflicted heavy losses on the Russian forces, reportedly killing more than 70 Russian soldiers before retreating, suffering heavy losses of their own. On the same day, Chechen separatist forces began carrying out a series of counter-attacks against federal troops in several villages as well as in the outskirts of Gudermes. Chechen fighters in Argun, a small town five kilometres east of Grozny, put up some of the strongest resistance to federal troops since the start of Moscow's military offensive. The separatists in the town of Urus-Martan also offered fierce resistance, employing guerilla tactics Russia had been anxious to avoid; by 9 December 1999, Russian forces were still bombarding Urus-Martan, although Chechen commanders said their fighters had already pulled out.

On 4 December 1999, the commander of Russian forces in the North Caucasus, General Viktor Kazantsev, claimed that Grozny was fully blockaded by Russian troops. The Russian military's next task was the seizure of the town of Shali, 20 kilometres south-east of the capital, one of the last remaining separatist-held towns apart from Grozny. Russian troops started by capturing two bridges that link Shali to the capital, and by 11 December 1999, Russian troops had encircled Shali and were slowly forcing separatists out. By mid-December, the Russian military was concentrating attacks in southern parts of Chechnya and preparing to launch another offensive from Dagestan.

=== Siege of Grozny ===
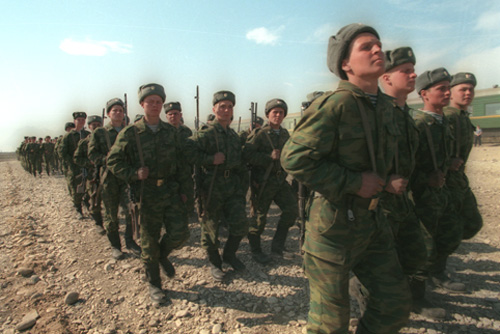
Russian Army soldiers in Khankala, Chechnya

The Russian assault on Grozny began in early December, accompanied by a struggle for neighbouring settlements. The battle ended when the Russian army seized the city on 2 February 2000. According to official Russian figures, at least 134 federal troops and an unknown number of pro-Russian militiamen died in Grozny. The separatist forces also suffered heavy losses, including losing several top commanders. Russian Defense Minister Igor Sergeyev said that 1,500 separatists were killed trying to leave Grozny. The separatists said they lost at least 500 fighters in the mine field at Alkhan-Kala. The siege and fighting devastated the capital like no other European city since World War II. In 2003, the United Nations called Grozny the most destroyed city on Earth. The Russians also suffered heavy losses as they advanced elsewhere, and from Chechen counterattacks and convoy ambushes. On 26 January 2000, the Russian government announced that 1,173 servicemen had been killed in Chechnya since October, more than double the 544 killed reported just 19 days earlier.

=== Battle for the mountains ===
Heavy fighting accompanied by massive shelling and bombing continued through the winter of 2000 in the mountainous south of Chechnya, particularly in the areas around Argun, Vedeno and Shatoy, where fighting involving Russian paratroopers had raged since 1999.

On 9 February 2000, a Russian tactical missile hit a crowd of people who had come to the local administration building in Shali, a town previously declared as one of the "safe areas", to collect their pensions. The attack was a response to a report that a group of fighters had entered the town. The missile is estimated to have killed some 150 civilians, and was followed by an attack by combat helicopters, causing further casualties. Human Rights Watch called on the Russian military to stop using FAE, known in Russia as "vacuum bombs", in Chechnya, concerned about the large number of civilian casualties caused by what it called "widespread and often indiscriminate bombing and shelling by Russian forces". On 18 February 2000, a Russian army transport helicopter was shot down in the south, killing 15 men aboard, Russian Interior Minister Vladimir Rushailo announced.

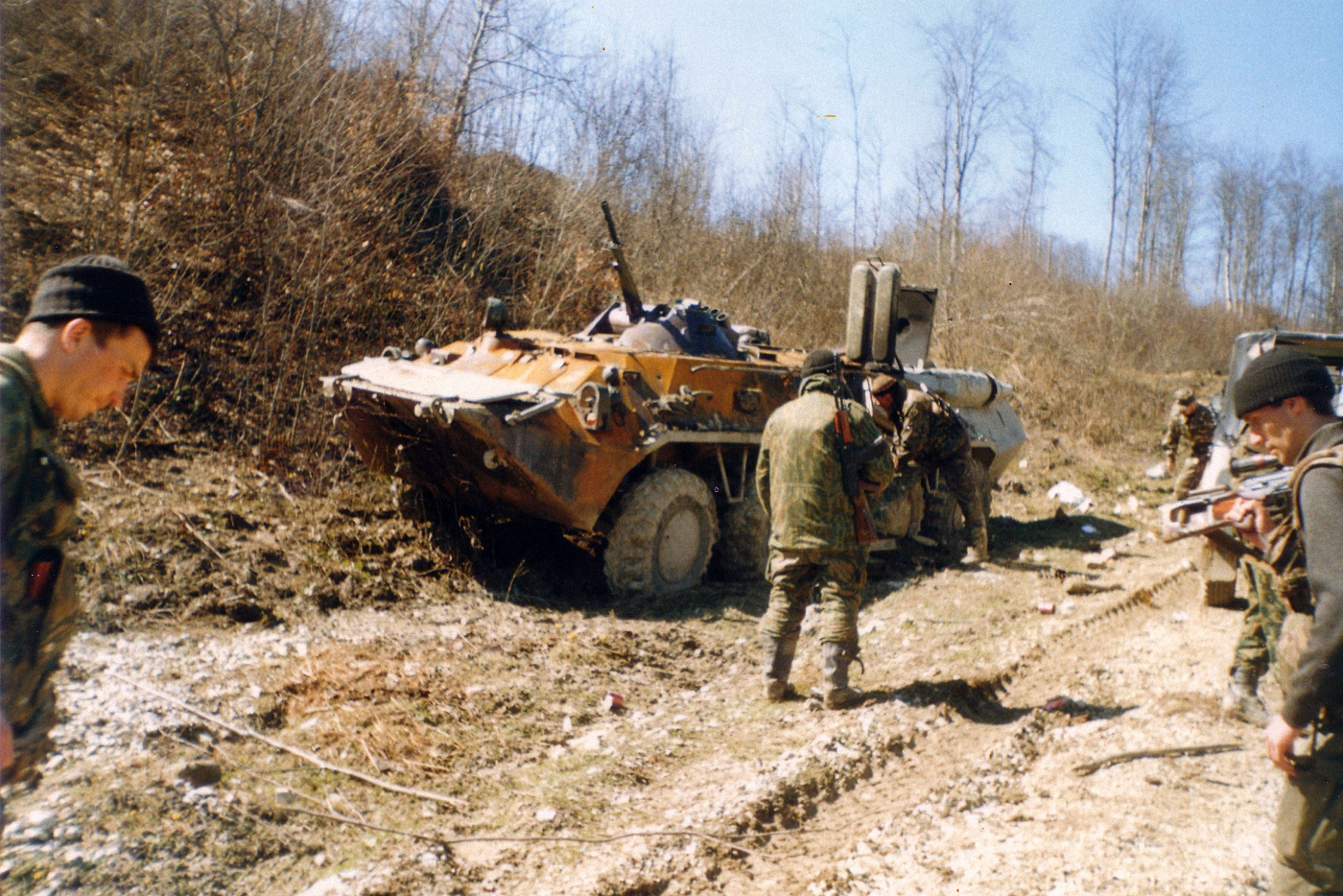
Zhani-Vedeno ambush, March 2000

On 29 February 2000, United Army Group commander Gennady Troshev said that "the counter-terrorism operation in Chechnya is over. It will take a couple of weeks longer to pick up splinter groups now." Russia's Defense Minister, Marshal of the Russian Federation Igor Sergeyev, evaluated the numerical strength of the separatists at between 2,000 and 2,500 men, "scattered all over Chechnya." On the same day, a Russian VDV paratroop company from Pskov was attacked by Chechen and Arab fighters near the village of Ulus-Kert in Chechnya's southern lowlands; at least 84 Russian soldiers were killed in the especially heavy fighting. The official newspaper of the Russian Ministry of Defense reported that at least 659 separatists were killed, including 200 from the Middle East, figures which they said were based on radio-intercept data, intelligence reports, eyewitnesses, local residents and captured Chechens. On 2 March 2000, an OMON unit from Podolsk opened fire on a unit from Sergiyev Posad in Grozny; at least 24 Russian servicemen were killed in the incident.

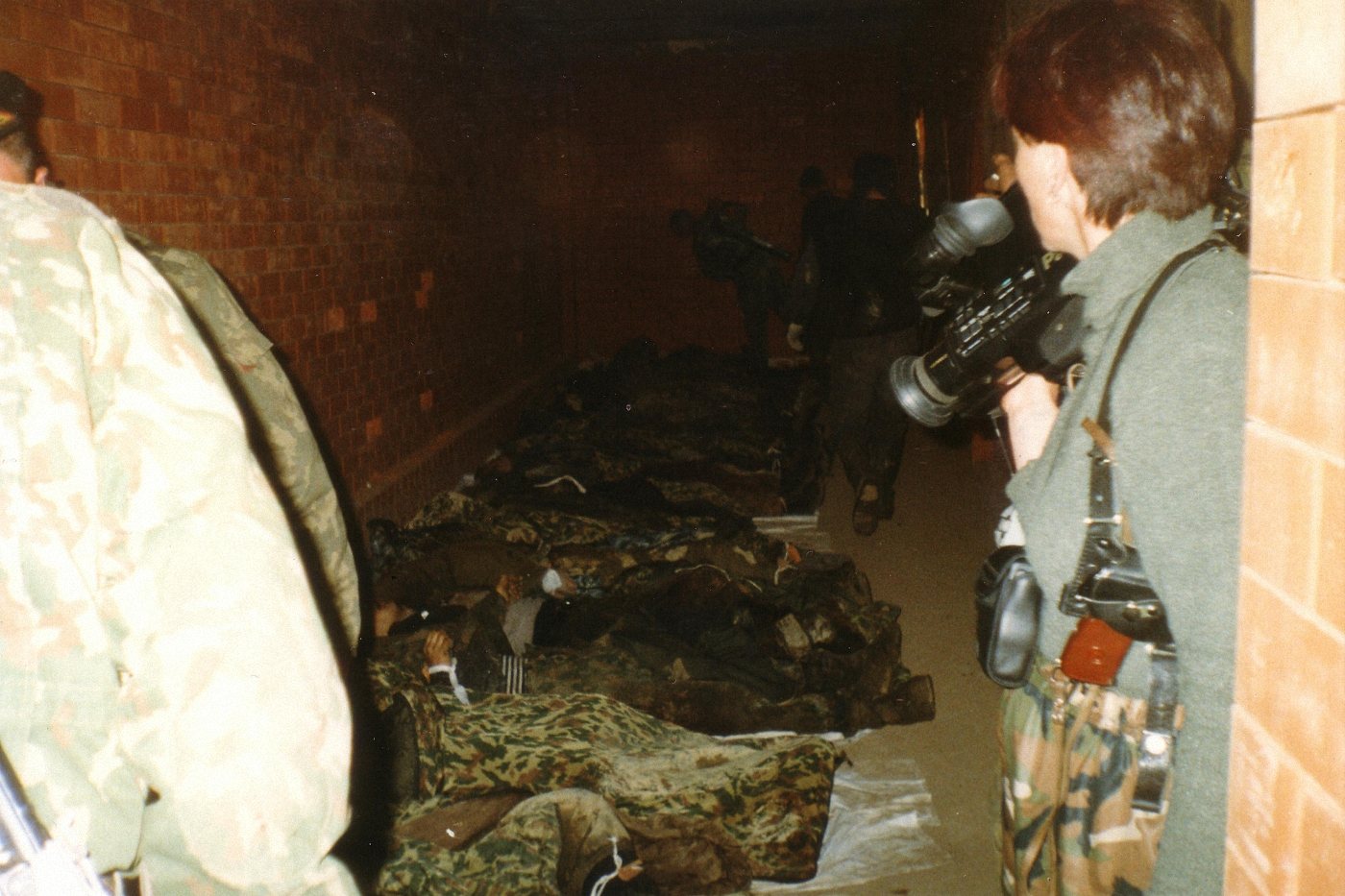
Fallen Russian soldiers in the Zhani-Vedeno ambush

In March a large group of more than 1,000 Chechen fighters, led by field commander Ruslan Gelayev, pursued since their withdrawal from Grozny, entered the village of Komsomolskoye in the Chechen foothills and held off a full-scale Russian attack on the town for over two weeks; they suffered hundreds of casualties, while the Russians admitted to more than 50 killed. On 29 March 2000, about 23 Russian soldiers were killed in a separatist ambush on an OMON convoy from Perm in Zhani-Vedeno.

On 23 April 2000, a 22-vehicle convoy carrying ammunition and other supplies to an airborne unit was ambushed near Serzhen-Yurt in the Vedeno Gorge by an estimated 80 to 100 "bandits", according to General Troshev. In the ensuing four-hour battle, the federal side lost 15 government soldiers, according to the Russian defence minister. General Troshev told the press that the bodies of four separatist fighters had been found. The Russian Airborne Troops headquarters later stated that 20 separatists were killed and two taken prisoner. Soon, the Russian forces seized the last populated centres of the organized resistance.

=== Restoration of federal government ===
In May 2000, the following month, Putin appointed Akhmad Kadyrov interim head of the pro-Moscow government. This development met with early approval in the rest of Russia, but the continued deaths of Russian troops dampened public enthusiasm. On 23 March 2003, a new Chechen constitution was passed in a referendum. The 2003 Constitution granted the Chechen Republic a significant degree of autonomy, but still tied it firmly to Russia and Moscow's rule, and went into force on 2 April 2003. The referendum was strongly supported by the Russian government but met a harsh critical response from Chechen separatists; many citizens chose to boycott the ballot. Akhmad Kadyrov was assassinated by a bomb blast in 2004. Since December 2005, his son Ramzan Kadyrov, leader of the pro-Moscow militia known as kadyrovtsy, has been functioning as Chechnya's de facto ruler. Kadyrov has become Chechnya's most powerful leader and, in February 2007, with support from Putin, Ramzan Kadyrov replaced Alu Alkhanov as president.

== Insurgency ==
=== Guerrilla war in Chechnya ===
Guerrilla phase by year: 2000, 2001, 2002, 2003, 2004, 2005, 2006, 2007, 2008, 2009

Although large-scale fighting within Chechnya had ceased, daily attacks continued, particularly in the southern portions of Chechnya and spilling into nearby territories of the Caucasus, especially after the Caucasus Front was established. Typically, small separatist units targeted Russian and pro-Russian officials, security forces, and military and police convoys and vehicles. The separatist units employed IEDs and sometimes combined for larger raids. Russian forces retaliated with artillery and air strikes, as well as counter-insurgency operations. Most soldiers in Chechnya were kontraktniki (contract soldiers) as opposed to the earlier conscripts. While Russia continued to maintain a military presence within Chechnya, federal forces played less of a direct role. Pro-Kremlin Chechen forces under the command of Kadyrov, known as the kadyrovtsy, dominated law enforcement and security operations, with many members (including Kadyrov himself) being former Chechen separatists who had defected since 1999. Since 2004, the Kadyrovtsy were partly incorporated into two Interior Ministry units, North and South (Sever and Yug). Two other units of the Chechen pro-Moscow forces, East and West (Vostok and Zapad), were commanded by Sulim Yamadayev (Vostok) and Said-Magomed Kakiyev (Zapad) and their men. The incorporation of the Kadyrovtsy improved the effectiveness of Russian counterinsurgency operations, perhaps due to Chechen soldiers having potential advantages over Russians with regards to the gathering of intelligence on local insurgents.

On 16 April 2009, the head of the FSB, Alexander Bortnikov, announced that Russia had ended its "anti-terror operation" in Chechnya, claiming that stability had been restored to the territory. "The decision is aimed at creating the conditions for the future normalisation of the situation in the republic, its reconstruction and development of its socio-economic sphere," Bortnikov stated. While Chechnya had largely stabilised, there were still clashes with militants in the nearby regions of Dagestan and Ingushetia.

=== Suicide attacks ===
Between June 2000 and September 2004, Chechen insurgents added suicide attacks to their tactics. During this period, there were 23 Chechen-related suicide attacks in and outside Chechnya, notably the hostage taking at an elementary school in Beslan, in which at least 334 people died.

=== Assassinations ===
Both sides of the war carried out multiple assassinations. The most prominent of these included the 13 February 2004 killing of exiled former separatist Chechen President Zelimkhan Yandarbiyev in Qatar, and the 9 May 2004 killing of Kadyrov during a parade in Grozny.

=== Caucasus Front ===
While anti-Russian local insurgencies in the North Caucasus started even before the war, in May 2005, two months after Maskahdov's death, Chechen separatists officially announced that they had formed a Caucasus Front within the framework of "reforming the system of military–political power." Along with the Chechen, Dagestani and Ingush "sectors," the Stavropol, Kabardin-Balkar, Krasnodar, Karachai-Circassian, Ossetian and Adyghe jamaats were included. This meant that practically all the regions of Russia's south were involved in the hostilities.

The Chechen separatist movement took on a new role as the official ideological, logistical, and, probably, financial hub of the new insurgency in the North Caucasus. Increasingly frequent clashes between federal forces and local militants continued in Dagestan, while sporadic fighting erupted in the other southern Russia regions, such as Ingushetia, and notably in Nalchik on 13 October 2005.

== Human rights and terrorism ==
=== Human rights and war crimes ===
The Second Chechen War saw a new wave of war crimes and violation of international humanitarian law. Both sides have been criticised by international organizations for violating the Geneva Conventions. However, a report by Human Rights Watch states that, without minimizing the abuses committed by Chechen fighters, the main reason for civilian suffering in the Second Chechen War came as a result of the abuses committed by the Russian forces on the civilian population. According to Amnesty International, Chechen civilians have been purposely targeted by Russian forces, in apparent disregard of humanitarian law. The situation has been described by Amnesty International as a Russian campaign to punish an entire ethnic group, on the pretext of "fighting crime and terrorism". Russian forces have throughout the campaign failed to follow their Geneva Convention obligations, and have taken little responsibility for protecting the civilian population. Amnesty International stated in their 2001 report that Chechen civilians, including medical personnel, have been the target of military attacks by Russian forces, and hundreds of Chechen civilians and prisoners of war are extrajudicially executed.

According to human rights activists, Russian troops systematically committed the following crimes in Chechnya: the destruction of cities and villages, not justified by military necessity; shelling and bombardment of unprotected settlements; summary extrajudicial executions and killings of civilians; torture, ill-treatment and infringement of human dignity; serious bodily harm intentionally inflicted on persons not directly participating in hostilities; deliberate strikes against the civilian population, civilian and medical vehicles; illegal detentions of the civilian population and enforced disappearances; looting and destruction of civilian and public property; extortion; taking hostages for ransom; corpse trade. There were also rapes, which, along with women, were committed against men. According to the Minister of Health of Ichkeria, Umar Khanbiev, Russian forces committed organ harvesting and organ trade during the conflict.

Russian forces have, since the beginning of the conflict, indiscriminately and disproportionately bombed and shelled civilian objects, resulting in heavy civilian casualties. On one such occasion in October 1999, ten powerful hypersonic missiles fell without warning and targeted the city's only maternity hospital, post office, mosque, and a crowded market. Most of the casualties occurred at the central market, and the attack is estimated to have killed over 100 instantly and injuring up to 400 others. Similar incidents include the Baku–Rostov highway bombing where the Russian Air Force perpetrated repeated rocket attacks on a large convoy of refugees trying to enter Ingushetia through a supposed "safe exit". This was repeated in December 1999 when Russian soldiers opened fire on a refugee convoy marked with white flags.

The 1999–2000 siege and bombardments of Grozny caused between 5,000 and 8,000 civilians to perish. The Russian army issued an ultimatum during the Grozny siege urging Chechens to leave the city or be destroyed without mercy. Around 300 people were killed while trying to escape in October 1999 and subsequently buried in a mass grave. The bombing of Grozny included banned Buratino thermobaric and fuel-air bombs, igniting the air of civilians hiding in basements. There were also reports of the use of chemical weapons, banned according to Geneva law. The Russian president, Putin vowed that the military would not stop bombing Grozny until Russian troops 'fulfilled their task to the end.' In 2003, the United Nations called Grozny the most destroyed city on Earth.

Another occasion of indiscriminate and perhaps deliberate bombardment is the bombing of Katyr-Yurt which occurred on 4–6 February 2000. The village of Katyr Yurt was far from the war's front line, and jam-packed with refugees. It was untouched on the morning of 4 February when Russian aircraft, helicopters, fuel-air bombs and Grad missiles pulverised the village. After the bombing the Russian army allowed buses in, and allowed a white-flag refugee convoy to leave after which they bombed that as well. Banned thermobaric weapons were fired on the village of Katyr-Yurt. Hundreds of civilians died as a result of the Russian bombardment and the following sweep. Thermobaric weapons have been used by the Russian army on several occasions according to Human Rights Watch.

During the Alkhan-Yurt massacre where Russian soldiers went on a murdering spree throughout the village and summarily executing, raping, torturing, looting, burning and killing anyone in their way. Nearly all the killings were committed by Russian soldiers who were looting. Civilian attempts to stop the killings were often met with death. There has been no serious attempt conducted by the Russian authorities to bring to justice those accountable for the crimes committed at Alkhan-Yurt. Credible testimony suggests that Russian leadership in the region had knowledge of what was happening and simply chose to ignore it. Russian military leadership dismissed the incident as "fairy tales", claiming that the bodies were planted and the slaughter fabricated in order to damage the reputation of Russian troops. Russian general Shamanov dismissed accountability for the abuses in the village saying "Don't you dare touch the soldiers and officers of the Russian army. They are doing a sacred thing today- they are defending Russia. And don't you dare sully the Russian soldier with your dirty hands!"

In what is regarded as one of gravest war crimes in the war, Russian federal forces went on a village-sweep (zachistka), that involved summary executions of dozens of people, murder, looting, arson and rape of Chechens (including committing other crimes) in what is known as the Novye Aldi massacre. Russian troops had cluster-bombed the village a day prior before entering the village, telling local residents to come out from their cellars for inspection the next day. Upon entering the village, Russian soldiers shot their victims in cold blood, with automatic fire at close range. Victims ranged from a one-year-old baby to an 82-year-old woman. Victims were asked for money or jewelry by Russian soldiers, which served as a pretext for their execution if the amount was insufficient. Federal soldiers removed gold teeth from their victims and looted their corpses. Killings were accompanied by arson in an attempt to destroy evidence of summary executions and other civilian killings. There were several cases of rape. In one incident, Russian soldiers gang raped several women before strangling them to death. Pillage on a massive scale took place in the village, with Russian soldiers stripping the houses of civilians in broad daylight. Any attempt to make the Russian authorities take responsibility for the massacre resulted in indignant denial. HRW described the Russian authorities' response as "typical". A spokesperson from the Russian Ministry of Defence declared that "these assertions are nothing but a concoction not supported by fact or any proof . . . [and] should be seen as a provocation whose goal is to discredit the federal forces' operation against the terrorists in Chechnya." An eye-witness also said that investigators from the FSB told her the massacre was probably committed by Chechen fighters "disguised as federal troops".

Western European rights groups estimate there have been about 5,000 forced disappearances in Chechnya since 1999. Dozens of mass graves containing hundreds of corpses have been uncovered since the start of the Chechen conflict. As of June 2008, there were 57 registered locations of mass graves in Chechnya. According to Amnesty International, thousands may be buried in unmarked graves including the 5,000 civilians who disappeared since the beginning of the Second Chechen War in 1999. In 2008, the largest mass grave found to date was uncovered in Grozny, containing some 800 bodies from the First Chechen War in 1995. Russia's general policy to the Chechen mass graves is to not exhume them.

American Secretary of State Albright noted in her 24 March 2000 speech to the United Nations Commission on Human Rights:

We cannot ignore the fact that thousands of Chechen civilians have died and more than 200,000 have been driven from their homes. Together with other delegations, we have expressed our alarm at the persistent, credible reports of human rights violations by Russian forces in Chechnya, including extrajudicial killings. There are also reports that Chechen separatists have committed abuses, including the killing of civilians and prisoners.... The war in Chechnya has greatly damaged Russia's international standing and is isolating Russia from the international community. Russia's work to repair that damage, both at home and abroad, or its choice to risk further isolating itself, is the most immediate and momentous challenge that Russia faces.

The Russian government failed to pursue any accountability process for human rights abuses committed during the course of the conflict in Chechnya. Unable to secure justice domestically, hundreds of victims of abuse have filed applications with the European Court of Human Rights (ECHR). In March 2005, the court issued the first rulings on Chechnya, finding the Russian government guilty of violating the right to life and even the prohibition of torture concerning civilians who had died or been forcibly disappeared at the hands of Russia's federal troops. Many similar claims were ruled since against Russia.

=== Terrorist attacks ===
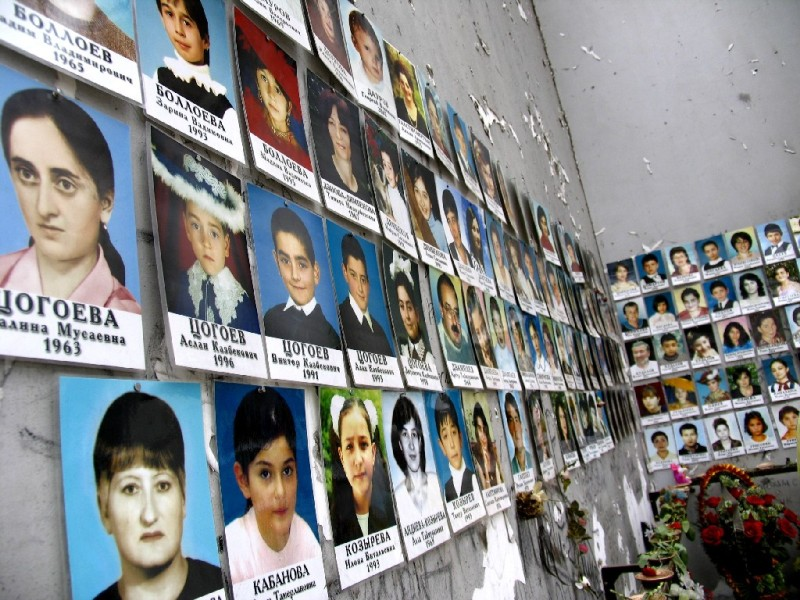
Photos of the victims of the 2004 Beslan school hostage crisis

Between May 2002 and September 2004, the Chechen and Chechen-led militants, mostly answering to Shamil Basayev, launched a campaign of terrorism directed against civilian targets in Russia. About 200 people were killed in a series of bombings (most of them suicide attacks), most of them in the 2003 Stavropol train bombing (46), the 2004 Moscow metro bombing (40), and the 2004 Russian aircraft bombings (89). Two big kidnaps, the 2002 Moscow theater hostage crisis and the Beslan school hostage crisis in 2004, resulted in the deaths of many civilians. In the Moscow stand-off, FSB Spetsnaz forces stormed the building on the third day using an unknown incapacitating chemical agent that proved to be lethal without sufficient medical care, resulting in deaths of 133 out of 916 hostages. In Beslan, some 20 hostages had been murdered by their captors before the assault, and the ill-prepared assault (started hastily after explosions in the gym that had been rigged with explosives by the terrorists) resulted in 294 more casualties among the 1,128 hostages, as well as many losses among the special forces.

== Other issues ==
=== Kodori crisis and Pankisi Gorge crisis ===
On 8 October 2001, a UNOMIG helicopter was shot down in Georgia in Kodori Valley gorge near Abkhazia, amid fighting between Chechens and Abkhazians, killing nine, including five UN observers. Georgia denied having troops in the area, and the suspicion fell on the armed group headed by Chechen warlord Gelayev, who was speculated to have been hired by the Georgian government to wage proxy war against separatist Abkhazia.

Russian officials accused neighbouring Georgia of allowing Chechen separatists to operate on Georgian territory and permitting the flow of militants and materiel across the border. In February 2002, the United States began offering assistance to Georgia to combat "criminal elements" and jihadist activity in the Pankisi Gorge as part of the War on Terrorism.

In August 2002, Georgia accused Russia of a series of secret air strikes on purported separatist havens in the Pankisi Gorge in which a Georgian civilian was reported killed.

In late August 2002, Georgia deployed more than 1,000 troops to the gorge. The troops detained an Arab man and six criminals, and on 2 September, President Shevardnadze declared the region under control.

On 2 March 2004, following a number of cross-border raids from Georgia into Chechnya, Ingushetia, and Dagestan, Gelayev was killed in a clash with Russian border guards while trying to get back from Dagestan into Georgia.

=== Unilateral ceasefire of 2005 ===
On 2 February 2005, Chechen separatist president Maskhadov issued a call for a ceasefire lasting until at least 22 February (the day preceding the anniversary of Stalin's deportation of the Chechen population). The call was issued through a separatist website and addressed to President Putin, described as a gesture of goodwill. On 8 March 2005, Maskhadov was killed in an operation by Russian security forces in the Chechen community of Tolstoy-Yurt, northeast of Grozny.

Shortly following Maskhadov's death, the Chechen separatist council announced that Abdul-Khalim Sadulayev had assumed the leadership, a move that was quickly endorsed by Shamil Basayev (Basayev himself died in July 2006). On 2 February 2006, Sadulayev made large-scale changes in his government, ordering all its members to move into Chechen territory. Among other things, he removed First Vice-Premier Akhmed Zakayev from his post (although later Zakayev was appointed a Foreign Minister). Sadulayev was killed in June 2006, after which he was succeeded as the separatist leader by the veteran terrorist commander Doku Umarov.

=== Amnesties ===
As of November 2007, there were at least seven amnesties for separatist militants, as well as federal servicemen who committed crimes, declared in Chechnya by Moscow since the start of the second war. The first one was announced in 1999 when about 400 Chechens switched sides. (However, according to Putin's advisor and aide Aslambek Aslakhanov most of them were since killed, both by their former comrades and by the Russians, who by then perceived them as a potential "fifth column".) Some of the other amnesties included one during September 2003 in connection with the adoption of the republic's new constitution, and then another between mid-2006 and January 2007. In 2007, the International Helsinki Federation for Human Rights published a report entitled Amnestied People as Targets for Persecution in Chechnya, which documents the fate of several persons who have been amnestied and subsequently abducted, tortured and killed.

=== Government censorship of the media coverage ===
The first war, with its extensive and largely unrestricted coverage (despite deaths of many journalists), convinced the Kremlin more than any other event that it needed to control national television channels, which most Russians rely on for news, to undertake any major national policy. By the time the second war began, federal authorities had designed and introduced a comprehensive system to limit the access of journalists to Chechnya and shape their coverage.

The Russian government's control of all Russian television stations and its use of repressive rules, harassment, censorship, intimidation and attacks on journalists almost completely deprived the Russian public of independent information on the conflict. Practically all the local Chechen media are under the control of the pro-Moscow government, Russian journalists in Chechnya face intense harassment and obstruction, leading to widespread self-censorship, while foreign journalists and media outlets too are pressured into censoring their reports on the conflict. In some cases Russian journalists reporting on Chechnya were jailed (Boris Stomakhin) or kidnapped (Andrei Babitsky), and foreign media outlets (American Broadcasting Company) banned from Russia. Russia's step came in retaliation for ABC's broadcast of an interview with Shamil Basayev, the Chechen rebel leader who ordered and/or carried out some of the worst terrorist acts in the country's history, including the school siege in Beslan that left 330 people dead. The Russian-Chechen Friendship Society was shut down on "extremism and national hatred" charges. According to a 2007 poll, only 11 percent of Russians said they were happy with media coverage of Chechnya.

== Effects ==
=== Civilian losses ===
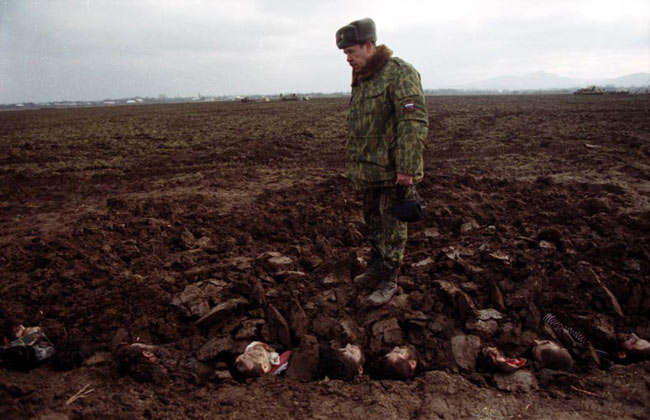
A Russian soldier stands on a mass grave of Chechen civilians in Komsomolskoye, 2000

In the Second Chechen War, over 60,000 combatants and non-combatants were killed. Civilian casualty estimates vary widely. According to the pro-Moscow Chechnyan government, 160,000 combatants and non-combatants died or have gone missing in the two wars, including 30,000–40,000 Chechens and about 100,000 Russians, while separatist leader Aslan Maskhadov (deceased) repeatedly claimed about 200,000 ethnic Chechens died as a consequence of the two conflicts. In 2005 Dukvakha Abdurakhmanov, a deputy prime minister in the Kremlin-controlled Chechen civilian administration, estimated the total death toll including civilians and combatants to be around 300,000. As in the case of military losses, these claims can not be independently verified. According to a count by the Russian human rights group Memorial in 2007, up to 25,000 civilians have died or disappeared since 1999. According to Amnesty International in 2007, the second war killed up to 25,000 civilians since 1999, with up to another 5,000 people missing. However, the Russian-Chechen Friendship Society set their estimate of the total death toll in two wars at about 150,000 to 200,000 civilians.

=== Material and environmental damage ===
Environmental agencies warn that the Russian republic of Chechnya, devastated by war, faces ecological disaster. A former aide to Yeltsin said Russian bombing has rendered Chechnya an "environmental wasteland." Several oil spills and pollution from sewers were caused by war (the water is polluted to a depth of 250 m), and chemical and radioactive pollution, as a result of the bombardment of chemical facilities and storages during the conflict. Chechnya's wildlife also sustained heavy damage during the hostilities, as animals that had once populated the Chechen forests have moved off to seek safer ground. In 2004, Russian government has designated one-third of Chechnya a "zone of ecological disaster" and another 40% "a zone of extreme environmental distress".

Approximately 60,000 housing units were damaged or destroyed, while 30,000 hectares (300 km^{2}) of agricultural land were contamined by explosives.

=== Land mines ===
In 2004, Chechnya became the most land mine-affected region worldwide. Since 1994 there have been widespread use of mines by both sides (Russia is a party to the 1980 Convention on Conventional Weapons but not the 1996 protocol on land mines and other devices). The most heavily mined areas of Chechnya are those in which separatists continued to put up resistance, namely the southern regions, as well as the borders of the republic. No humanitarian mine clearance has taken place since the HALO Trust was evicted by Russia in December 1999. In June 2002, Olara Otunnu, the UN official, estimated that there were 500,000 land mines placed in the region. UNICEF has recorded 2,340 civilian land mine and unexploded ordnance casualties occurring in Chechnya between 1999 and the end of 2003.

=== Military losses ===
Military casualty figures from both sides are impossible to verify and are generally believed to be higher. In September 2000, the Kavkaz Center compiled a list of casualties officially announced in the conflict, which, although incomplete and with little factual value, provides some minimal insight into the casualties. According to the figures released by the Russian Ministry of Defence in August 2005, at least 1,250 Russian Armed Forces soldiers were killed in action in 1999–2005. This death toll did not include losses of Internal Troops, the FSB, police and local paramilitaries, of whom all at least 1,720 were killed by October 2003. Independent Russian and Western estimates are much higher; the Union of the Committees of Soldiers' Mothers of Russia, for instance, estimated about 2,000 Russian Army servicemen have been killed between 1999 and 2003.

=== Political radicalization of the separatist movement ===
The Chechens had become increasingly radicalized. Former Soviet Armed Forces officers Dzhokhar Dudayev and Aslan Maskhadov were succeeded by people who rely more on Islamist doctrine, rather than the secular nationalistic feelings of the population. While Dudayev and Maskhadov were seeking from Moscow recognition of the independence of the Chechen Republic of Ichkeria, other leaders spoke out more about the need to expel Russia from the territory of the whole North Caucasus, an impoverished mountain region inhabited mostly by Muslim, non-Russian ethnic groups.

In April 2006, asked whether negotiations with Russians are possible, the top separatist commander Doku Umarov answered: "We offered them many times. But it turned out that we constantly press for negotiations and it's as if we are always standing with an extended hand and this is taken as a sign of our weakness. Therefore, we don't plan to do this any more." In the same month, the new separatist spokesman Movladi Udugov said that attacks should be expected anywhere in Russia: "Today, we have a different task on our hands – total war, war everywhere our enemy can be reached. (...) And this means mounting attacks at any place, not just in the Caucasus but in all Russia." Reflecting growing radicalization of the Chechen-led militants, Udugov said their goal was no longer Western-style democracy and independence, but the Islamist "North Caucasian Emirate".

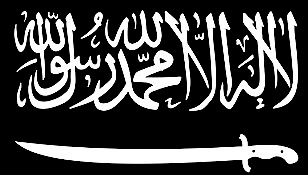
Flag of the Caucasian Emirate

This trend ultimately resulted in the October 2007 declaration of the Caucasus Emirate by Doku Umarov where he also urged for a global Jihad, and the political schism between the moderates and the radical Islamists fighting in Chechnya and the neighbouring regions with ties in the Middle East. Some commanders, still fighting along with Doku Umarov, like Anzor Astemirov, publicly denounced the idea of a global Jihad, but keep fighting for the independence of Caucasus states.

The struggle garnered support from Muslim sympathizers around the world nonetheless, and some of them were willing to take up arms. Many commentators thought it was likely that Chechen fighters had links with international Islamist separatist groups. The BBC said in an online Q&A on the conflict: "It has been known for years that Muslim volunteers have traveled to Chechnya to join the fight, reportedly after attending training camps in Afghanistan or Pakistan."

Islamic radicalisation also affected the Chechen separatist movement's support abroad. In 2013, the Tsarnaev brothers launched a suicide attack in Boston with a claim of jihad, accusing the United States of killing Muslims of Iraq, Afghanistan and Palestine, weakening sympathy for the Chechen resistance globally and increasing xenophobia against Chechens and Muslims in the United States. Rampant Islamic terrorism in Europe and the prominent role of Chechens in the Islamic State of Iraq and the Levant, exemplified by Abu Omar al-Shishani, also put the Chechen separatist movement in jeopardy due to increasing anti-Islamic sentiment on the rise in Europe, even in some of the countries in Europe like Poland, who supported Chechens during and after conflicts with Russia.

=== Impact on the Chechen population ===
According to a 2006 report by Médecins Sans Frontières, "the majority of Chechens still struggle through lives burdened by fear, uncertainty and poverty." A survey conducted by MSF in September 2005 showed that 77% of the respondents were suffering from "discernible symptoms of psychological distress".

As of 2008, the infant mortality rate stood at 17 per 1,000, the highest in Russia; There are reports of a growing number of genetic disorders in babies and unexplained illnesses among school children. One child in ten is born with some kind of anomaly that requires treatment. Some children whose parents can afford it are sent to the neighbouring republic of Dagestan, where treatment is better; Chechnya lacks sufficient medical equipment in most of its medical facilities. According to the United Nations Children's Fund (UNICEF), since 1994 to 2008 about 25,000 children in Chechnya have lost one or both parents. A whole generation of Chechen children is showing symptoms of psychological trauma. In 2006, Chechnya's pro-Moscow deputy health minister, said the Chechen children had become "living specimens" of what it means to grow up with the constant threat of violence and chronic poverty. In 2007, the Chechen interior ministry has identified 1,000 street children involved in vagrancy; the number was increasing.

According to official statistics, Chechnya's unemployment rate in August 2009 was 32.9%. By 2017, this figure had decreased to 13.9%. Many people remain homeless because so much of Chechnya's housing was destroyed by the Russian federal forces and many people have not yet been given compensation. Not only the social (such as housing and hospitals) and economic infrastructure but also the foundations of culture and education, including most of educational and cultural institutions, were destroyed over the course of the two wars in Chechnya. However, ongoing reconstruction efforts have been rebuilding the region at a quick pace over the past few years, including new housing, facilities, paved roads and traffic lights, a new mosque, and restoration of electricity to much of the region. Governmental, social and commercial life remain hobbled by bribery, kidnapping, extortion and other criminal activity; reports by the Russian government estimate that the organized crime sector is twice the Russian average and the government is widely perceived to be corrupt and unresponsive.

Hundreds of thousands of Chechens were displaced by the conflict, including 300,000 at the height of the conflict in 2000. Most of them were displaced internally in Chechnya and in neighbouring republic of Ingushetia, but thousands of refugees also went into exile, with, as of 2008, most of them residing in the European Union countries.

=== Impact on the Russian population ===
The start of the war bolstered the domestic popularity of Vladimir Putin as the campaign was started one month after he had become Russian prime minister. The conflict greatly contributed to the deep changes in the Russian politics and society.

Since the Chechen conflict began in 1994, cases of young veterans returning embittered and traumatized to their home towns were reported all across Russia. Psychiatrists, law-enforcement officials, and journalists started calling the condition of psychologically scarred soldiers "Chechen syndrome" (CS), drawing a parallel with the post-traumatic stress disorders suffered by Soviet soldiers who fought in Afghanistan. According to Yuri Alexandrovsky, deputy director of the Moscow Serbsky Institute in 2003, at least 70% of the estimated 1.5 million Chechnya veterans suffered CS. Many of the veterans came back alcoholic, unemployable and antisocial. Thousands were also physically disabled for life and left with very limited help from the government.

According to the 2007 study by Memorial and Demos human rights organisations, Russian policemen lost their qualifications and professional skills during their duty tours in Chechnya. The conflict was linked to the rising brutality and general criminalisation of the Russian police forces. According to human rights activists and journalists, tens of thousands of police and security forces that went to Chechnya learned patterns of brutality and impunity and brought them to their home regions, often returning with disciplinary and psychological problems. Reliable numbers on police brutality are hard to come by, but in a statement released in 2006, the internal affairs department of Russia's Interior Ministry said that the number of recorded crimes committed by police officers rose 46.8% in 2005. In one nationwide poll in 2005, 71% of respondents said they didn't trust their police at all; in another, 41% Russians said they lived in fear of police violence. According to Amnesty International, torture of detainees in Russia had become endemic. Since 2007, police officers from outside the Caucasus were not only being sent to Chechnya, but to all the region's republics.

The wars in Chechnya and associated Caucasian terrorism in Russia were major factors in the growth of intolerance, xenophobia, and racist violence in Russia, directed in a great part against the people from the Caucasus. The Russian authorities were unlikely to label random attacks on people of non-Russian ethnicity as racist, preferring to call it "hooliganism". The number of murders officially classified as racist more than doubled in Russia between 2003 and 2004. The violence included acts of terrorism such as the 2006 Moscow market bombing which killed 13 people. In 2007, 18-year-old Artur Ryno claimed responsibility for 37 racially motivated murders in the course of one year, saying that "since school [he] hated people from the Caucasus." On 5 June 2007, an anti-Chechen riot involving hundreds of people took place in the town of Stavropol in southern Russia. Rioters demanded the eviction of ethnic Chechens following the murder of two young Russians who locals believed were killed by Chechens. The event revived memories of a recent clash between Chechens and local Russians in Kondopoga, when two Russians were killed over an unpaid bill. The Caucasians also face ethnic-related violence in the ranks of Russian Army.

== Status ==
In 2005, there were about 60,000 Federal troops in Chechnya, but that number has since decreased significantly. Tony Wood, a journalist and author who has written extensively about Chechnya, estimated there were about 8,000 local security forces remaining in the region as of 2007. Independent analysts say there are no more than 2,000 armed terrorists combatants still fighting, while Russia says only a few hundred remain. There is still some sporadic fighting in the mountains and south of the republic, but Russia has scaled down its presence significantly leaving the local government to stabilize things further. In February 2008 the president of the separatist Chechen Republic of Ichkeria, Dokka Umarov, spoke of "thousands of fighters" when he addressed a speech to all his fighters in the mountains.

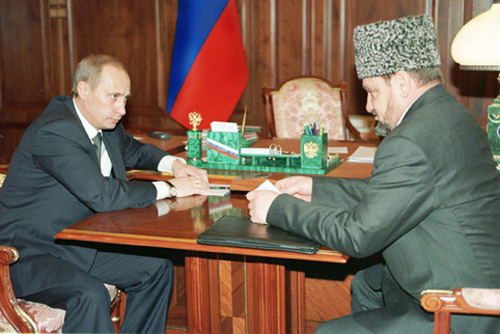
Akhmad Kadyrov, formerly a leading separatist mufti, had switched sides in 2000

Most of the more prominent past Chechen separatist leaders have died or have been killed, including former president Maskhadov and leading warlord and terrorist attack mastermind Basayev. Meanwhile, the fortunes of the Chechen independence movement sagged, plagued by the internal disunity between Chechen moderates and Islamist radicals and the changing global political climate after 11 September 2001, as well as the general war-weariness of the Chechen population. Large-scale fighting has been replaced by guerrilla warfare and bombings targeting federal troops and forces of the regional government, with the violence often spilling over into adjacent regions. Since 2005, the insurgency has largely shifted out of Chechnya proper and into the nearby Russian territories, such as Ingushetia and Dagestan; the Russian government, for its part, has focused on the stabilization of the North Caucasus.

Throughout the years Russian officials have often announced that the war is over. In April 2002, Putin declared that the war in Chechnya was over. The Russian government maintains the conflict officially ended in April 2002, and since then has continued largely as a peacekeeping operation.

In a 10 July 2006, interview with the BBC, Sergei Ivanov, Russia's then–prime minister and former minister of defense, said that "the war is over," and that "the military campaign lasted only 2 years."

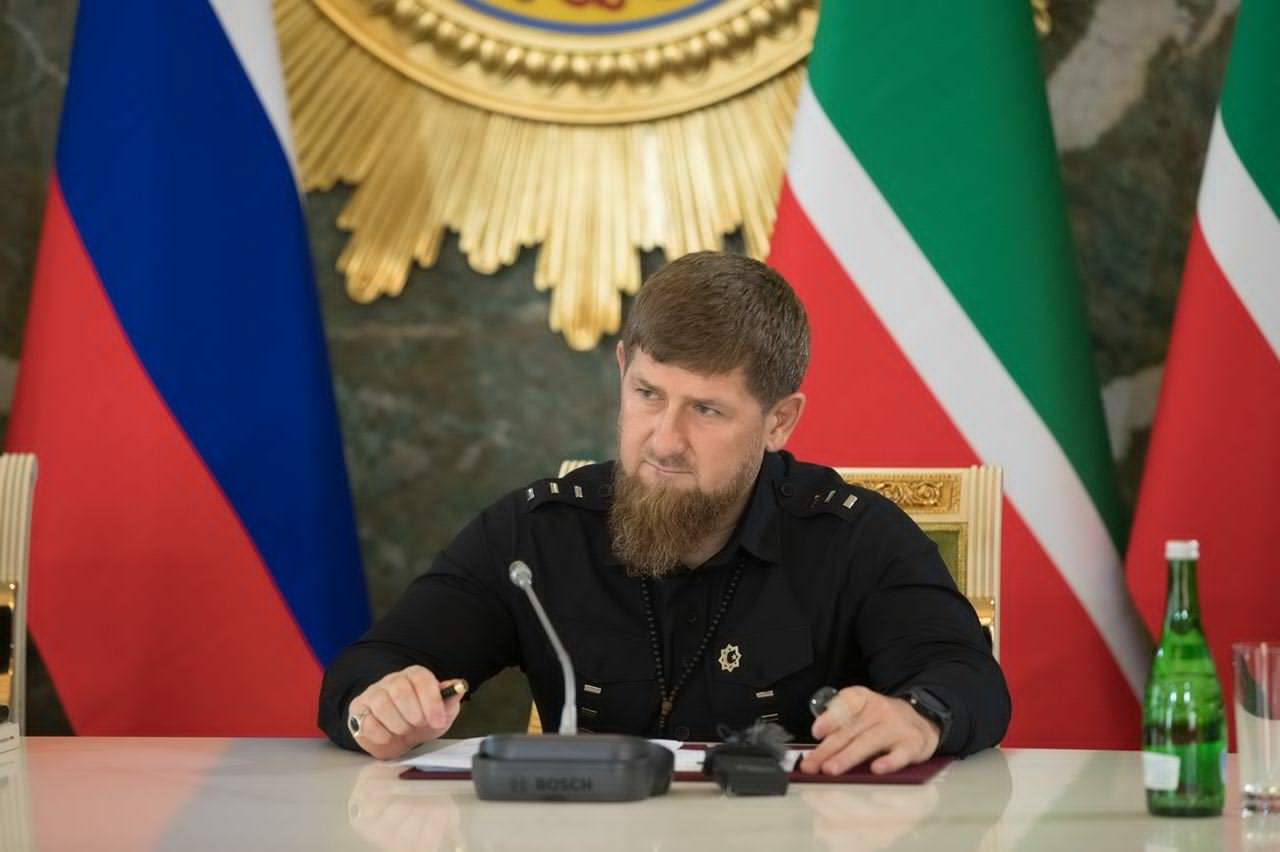
Chechen leader Ramzan Kadyrov

Ramzan Kadyrov, the current president of the Chechnya, has also stated the war is over. Others believe the war ended in 2003 with the passage of a Moscow-backed constitutional referendum and the election of pro-Moscow president Akhmad Kadyrov, while some consider the conflict on-going. Some independent observers, including Álvaro Gil-Robles, the human rights envoy for the Council of Europe, and Louise Arbour, the UN High Commissioner for Human Rights, have said that the war has largely concluded as of 2006.

The separatists denied that the war was over, and guerrilla warfare continued throughout the North Caucasus. Colonel Yamadayev, Chechnya's second most powerful loyalist warlord after Kadyrov, also denied that the war is over. In March 2007, Yamadayev claimed there were well over 1,000 separatists and foreign Islamic militants entrenched in the mountains of Chechnya alone: "The war is not over, the war is far from being over. What we are facing now is basically a classic partisan war and my prognosis is that it will last two, three, maybe even five more years." According to the CIA factbook, Russia has severely disabled the Chechen separatist movement, although sporadic violence still occurs throughout the North Caucasus. The overall security situation in Chechnya remains exceedingly difficult to accurately report due to the near monopoly the Russian government has on media covering the issue. In May 2007, Amnesty International refuted claims by the government that the conflict has ended, stating "while large-scale military operations have been reduced, the conflict continues." The strength of the separatists has for many years been unknown. Although Russia has killed a lot of separatists throughout the war, many young fighters have joined the separatists.

An estimation, based on the war reports, shows that in the past three years Federal casualties are higher than the number of coalition casualties of the War in Afghanistan (2001–2021). With the abolition of the Chechen Republic of Ichkeria and the proclamation of the Caucasus Emirate by Umarov, the conflict in Chechnya and the rest of the North Caucasus is often referred to as the "War in the North Caucasus". The Russian government has given no new name to the conflict while most international observers still refer to it as a continuation of the Second Chechen War.

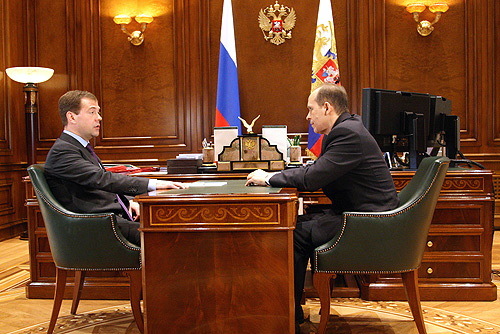
Dmitry Medvedev meets with Alexander Bortnikov on 27 March 2009 to discuss the ending of counter-terrorism operations in Chechnya.

In late April 2008, the Human Rights Commissioner for the Council of Europe, Thomas Hammarberg, visited Russia's Caucasian republics. After wrapping up the week-long visit, he said he observed a number of positive developments in Chechnya, and that there was "obvious progress". He also noted that the judicial system in Chechnya was functioning properly. According to Hammarberg, missing people and the identification of missing bodies were still the two biggest human rights issues in the region, and he expressed his wish that further efforts be done to clarify the issue. President Putin responded to his comments, saying that the visit was of "great significance", and that Russia will take into account what the council had to say.

Counter-insurgency operations have been conducted by Russian army in Chechnya since 1999. President of Chechnya, and former separatist Kadyrov declared this phase to end in March 2009. On 27 March 2009, President of Russia Dmitry Medvedev met with Bortnikov, the Director of the FSB to discuss the official ending of counter-terrorism operations in Chechnya. Medvedev directed the National Anti-Terrorism Committee, which Bortnikov also heads, to report to the Russian government on this issue, which will then be decided by the Russian parliament. However Medvedev said that situation in Chechnya must remain under direct control of the FSB.

On 16 April 2009, the counter-terrorism operation in Chechnya was officially ended. As of 2009, close to 480 active insurgents were fighting in the mountains under the leadership of Umarov according to official data. Umarov was killed by poisoning in 2013. Umarov's successor Aliaskhab Kebekov was reported killed in 2015. The "Caucasus Emirate" grouping founded by Umarov in 2007 was by 2015 largely absorbed into the ISIS-affiliated Vilayat Kavkaz led by Rustam Asilderov. Asilderov was reported killed in 2016.

On 18 October 2022, Ukraine's parliament condemned the "genocide of the Chechen people" during the First and Second Chechen Wars.

== See also ==
- Guerrilla phase of the Second Chechen War
- International response to the Second Chechen War
- Insurgency in Kabardino-Balkaria and Karachay-Cherkessia
- Insurgency in Ingushetia
- Insurgency in the North Caucasus

== Bibliography ==
- "Three Worlds Gone Mad" Author: Robert Young Pelton
- A Dirty War: A Russian Reporter in Chechnya Author: Anna Politkovskaya
- A Military History of Russia: From Ivan the Terrible to the War in Chechnya Author: David R. Stone (preview available)
- A Small Corner of Hell: Dispatches from Chechnya Author: Anna Politkovskaya (preview available)
- Allah's Mountains: The Battle for Chechnya Author: Sebastian Smith (preview available)
- Chechnya: From Nationalism to Jihad Author: James Hughes (preview available)
- Sakwa, Richard (2005). Chechnya: From Past To Future. London: Anthem Press. ISBN 9781843311645. OCLC 967386221.
- Chechnya: Life in a War-Torn Society Author: Valery Tishkov (preview available)
- Chechnya: The Case for Independence Author: Tony Wood
- Chechnya: To the Heart of a Conflict Author: Andrew Meier
- Chienne de Guerre: A Woman Reporter Behind the Lines of the War in Chechnya Author: Anne Nivat
- Crying Wolf: The Return of War to Chechnya Author: Vanora Bennett
- My Jihad Author: Aukai Collins
- One Soldier's War Author: Arkady Babchenko.
- Open Wound: Chechnya 1994–2003 Author: Stanley Greene
- Putin's Russia Author: Anna Politkovskaya
- Russia's Chechen Wars 1994–2000: Lessons from Urban Combat Author: Olga Oliker (preview available)
- Russia's Islamic Threat Author: Gordon M. Hahn
- Russia's Restless Frontier: The Chechnya Factor in Post-Soviet Russia Author: Dmitri Trenin, Anatol Lieven (preview available)
- Russia's Wars with Chechnya 1994–2003 Author: Michael Orr
- Russian Military Reform, 1992–2002 Author: Anne Aldis, Roger N. McDermott
- Russo-Chechen Conflict, 1800–2000: A Deadly Embrace Author: Robert Seely (preview available)
- The Angel of Grozny: Orphans of a Forgotten War Author: Asne Seierstad
- The Chechen Wars: Will Russia Go the Way of the Soviet Union? Author: Matthew Evangelista (preview available)
- The Lone Wolf and the Bear: Three Centuries of Chechen Defiance of Russian Rule Author: Moshe Gammer (preview available)
- The Oath: A Surgeon Under Fire Author: Khassan Baiev
- The Wolves of Islam: Russia and the Faces of Chechen Terror Author: Paul J. Murphy (preview available)
- "Welcome to Hell": Arbitrary Detention, Torture, and Extortion in Chechnya Author: Human Rights Watch (preview available)
