= Casualties of the Second Chechen War =

Estimates of casualties in the Second Chechen War vary wildly, from 25,000 to 200,000 civilian dead plus 8,000 to 40,000 Russian military. (Separate figures for Chechen military fatalities from the second war only are not yet referenced in this article.)

Note: Some of these figures include the First Chechen War of 1994–1996. They usually don't include the death toll in Dagestan, Ingushetia, and other neighbouring regions of North Caucasus, where the violence spilled over from Chechnya.

== Official figures ==
The following figures are not confirmed by serious academic sources or researchers, and are difficult to verify.

=== Russian losses by year ===
October 1, 1999 – December 31, 1999 – During the initial invasion in 1999, 259 Russian soldiers were killed.

January 1, 2000 – December 31, 2000 – During the initial invasion and the following Chechen Insurgency in 2000, 110 Russian soldiers were killed.

January 1, 2001 – December 31, 2001 – During the Chechen insurgency in 2001, 504 Russian soldiers were killed.

October 1, 1999 – October 10, 2001 – During this period, 106 FSB and GRU operatives were killed.

January 1, 2002 – December 31, 2002 – During the Chechen insurgency in 2002, 485 Russian soldiers were killed.

October 1, 1999 – December 23, 2002 – During the initial invasion and the following Chechen Insurgency from 1999 to 2002, 1,614-1,822 Interior Ministry troops were killed.

January 1, 2003 – December 31, 2003 – During the Chechen insurgency in 2003, 300 Russian soldiers were killed.

January 1, 2004 – December 31, 2004 – During the Chechen insurgency in 2004, 162 Russian soldiers were killed.

January 1, 2005 – December 31, 2005 – During the Chechen insurgency in 2005, 107 Russian soldiers were killed.

January 1, 2004 – December 30, 2005 – During the Chechen insurgency in 2004 and 2005, 279 Interior Ministry troops were killed.

July 1, 2005 - 10 Russian soldiers were killed this day by a bomb in Dagestan.

August 20, 2002 – August 20, 2006 – During this period, 200 Interior Ministry troops were killed in Dagestan.

January 1, 2006 – December 31, 2006 – During the Chechen insurgency in 2006, 57 Russian soldiers were killed.

January 1, 2007 – December 31, 2007 – During the Chechen insurgency in 2007, 54 Russian soldiers were killed.

January 1, 2007 – June 21, 2007 – During this period, 45 Interior Ministry troops were killed in both Chechnya and Dagestan.

January 1, 2001 – December 31, 2007 – During the Chechen insurgency, 1,072 Chechen police officers were killed.

January 1, 2008 – October 23, 2008 – During this period, 28 Russian soldiers were killed.

January 1, 2008 – December 31, 2008 – During 2008, 226 Interior Ministry troops were killed in the whole of the North Caucasus.

Total: 3,676 Russian soldiers, 2,364-2,572 Interior Ministry troops, 1,072 Chechen police officers, and 106 FSB and GRU operatives killed.

==== Russian generals killed ====
Image	Name	Rank	Date
	Stanislav Korovinsky	Major general	29 December 1999
	Mikhail Malofeev	Major general	18 January 2000
	Gennady Shpigun	Major general	March 2000
	Alexandr Otrakovsky	Major general	6 March 2000
	German Ugryumov	Admiral	31 May 2001
	Pavel Varfolomeev	Major general	17 September 2001
	Gaidar Gadzhiyev	Major general	1 December 2001
	Mikhail Rudchenko	Lieutenant general	27 January 2002
	Nikolai Garidov	Lieutenant general	27 January 2002
	Igor Shifrin	Lieutenant general	15 November 2002

=== Chechen militant losses ===
In May 2000, Chechen rebels reported on their website that they have lost 1,380 men since fighting started with Russia in the breakaway republic. On the Russian side, military officials said they had lost 2,004 soldiers.

In September 2000, the Prague Watchdog compiled the widely conflicting list of casualties and enemy losses officially announced by both sides in the first year of the conflict.

By December 2002, 14,113 Chechen fighters were reported to have been killed.

Between 2003 and 2009, 2,186 militants were reported to have been killed in the whole of the North Caucasus and 6,295 were captured.

=== Civilian casualties ===
The Chechen separatist sources in 2003 cited figures of some 250,000 civilians, and up to 50,000 Russian servicemen, killed during the 1994-2003 period. The rebel side also acknowledged about 5,000 separatist combatants killed as of 1999–2004, mostly in the initial phases of the war.

In November 2004, the chairman of Chechnya's pro-Moscow State Council, Taus Djabrailov, said over 200,000 people have been killed in the Chechen Republic since 1994, including over 20,000 children. In August 2005, Djabrailov gave a conflicting figure of 160,000 killed, of which between 30,000 and 40,000 were ethnic Chechens.

In June 2005, Dukvakha Abdurakhmanov, a deputy prime minister in the Kremlin-controlled Chechen administration, said about 300,000 people have been killed during two wars in Chechnya over the past decade; he also said that more than 200,000 people have gone missing. Every resident of Chechnya has scores of relatives who have been killed or gone missing, he said.

In September 2006, Anatoly Kulikov, deputy chairman of the Russian State Duma committee on security said that In the 12 years of our Russian antiterrorist war in the Chechen Republic, aggregate losses among the federal forces, illegal armed groups and civilians are estimated at about 45,000 people.

In November 2006, self-exiled separatist leader Akhmed Zakayev said that "Putin has already killed more than 250,000 innocent Chechens".

Ramzan Kadyrov, head of the Chechen Republic, said: "we lost 300,000 people". In addition, Chechen journalist Kazbek Chanturiya put the figure of Chechens killed in two wars at 300,000 .

== Independent estimates ==
In 2000, the Russian weekly Nezavisimoye Voyennoye Obozreniye (Independent Military Review) compiled an incomplete list of 1,176 military servicemen fallen in Chechnya during the first year of conflict. If available the list included name, year and place of birth, rank and military unit, place, date and cause of death.

For the period from 1994 to 2003, estimates ranged from 50,000 to 250,000 civilians and 10,000 to 50,000 Russian servicemen killed. Given that almost certainly both sides have tended to exaggerate enemy military casualties while minimizing their own and grossly underestimating its responsibility for civilian losses, the Russian-Chechen Friendship Society set the conservative estimate of death toll in this time period at about 150,000 - 200,000 civilians, 20,000 to 40,000 Russian soldiers, and possibly the same number of Chechen rebels.

In February 2003, the Union of the Committees of Soldiers' Mothers of Russia, estimated that some 11,000 servicemen have been killed, with another 25,000 wounded, since 1999. It also estimated the civilian death toll at about 20,000 people. Their estimate for the earlier Chechen war was 14,000 dead troops as compared with the official figure of 5,500.

According to 2003 Military Balance, the annual report International Institute for Strategic Studies, the British-based think tank, Russian forces suffered 4,749 dead, wounded or missing in hostile and non-hostile incidents in Chechnya between August 2002 and August 2003.

In 2004, Denis Trifonov of the British strategic-research centre Jane's Information Group estimated that the federal forces in Chechnya suffered some 9,000 to 11,000 combat deaths during the second war's most intense phase, from its beginning in late summer 1999 to early 2002. In 2003, they lost roughly 3,000 dead.

In 2004, the human rights group Memorial estimated the number of civilian casualties of both wars at "more than 200,000" and the number of Russian soldiers killed at 20,000 to 40,000

In 2006, Alexander Cherkasov of the human rights group Memorial pointed out that the Russian government did not make any attempt to count civilian casualties in the war of 1994–96, nor after 1999. Many figures have been quoted, some greatly exaggerated; a figure of 250,000 [civilian] dead in the two wars is sometimes repeated, but without there being adequate substantiation of such a number, Cherkasov said, and concluded: The total number of peaceful residents of the Chechen Republic who perished during the two wars may have reached 70,000. (...) [In the second war] the total number of civilians killed, including those who disappeared, adds up to between 14,800 to 24,100. However, he admitted that the accuracy of his estimates was not high.

In 2007, Memorial estimated about 15,000 Russian soldiers have died in total, while others estimated up to 40,000.

According to Amnesty International in 2007 the second war has killed up to 25,000 civilians since 1999 (many in the first months of the conflict), while up to another 5,000 people are missing. "Many thousands" of people are believed to be buried in unmarked graves.

A report of the Society for Threatened Peoples in November 2005 said that the total number of casualties of the first war was 80,000 and the total number of casualties of the second war was at least 80,000.

French public radio channel «France Culture» names a number from 100,000 to 300,000.

Al Jazeera puts losses at 300,000.

Russian politician Konstantin Borovoi: "300,000 Chechens died in the Chechen war".
