= Malika Umazheva =

Chechen politician

Malika Umazheva (1937–2002), a former school teacher, was the former head of the pro-Moscow administration of the Chechen village Alkhan-Kala. Umazheva was an outspoken critic of unlawful zachistka ("cleansing") raids that Russian forces conducted in her village and had had several confrontations with high-ranking Russian federal officers in the months prior to her death. She also worked closely with the Russian-Chechen Friendship Society.

According to the group Memorial's investigators, Umazheva was killed by a group of Russian special forces soldiers wearing camouflage uniforms and armed with VSS Vintorez silenced sniper rifles, who arrived at the village in an armoured vehicle and a military truck on the night of 29–30 November 2002. The soldiers broke into her home, where she lived with her son and two adopted daughters, and took her outside. Umazheva's body was discovered by the villagers soon after.

On 4 December 2002 a correspondent for Radio Liberty reported:

"More than 4,000 residents of the Chechen Republic gathered today for the funeral of Malika Umazheva in the settlement of Alkhan-Kala, and almost all of them signed an appeal to the [pro-Moscow] leadership and procuracy of the republic asking that they locate and punish those guilty of murdering a courageous Chechen woman who, despite all the threats from the Russian special services, the MVD, and the soldiers of the Combined Group of Forces in Chechnya, always stood in defense of the rights of the populace of Alkhan-Kala, documenting all illegal actions committed by the soldiers during their many special operations and raids on that population point."

Her friend Anna Politkovskaya, in a tribute to her in Novaya Gazeta the next day, called her "a true heroine" and said the chief of the General Staff, General Anatoly Kvashnin, "hated her so much that he invented the vilest stories about her... And she? She... sued him in court, knowing perfectly well that almost everyone is afraid of him.... But Kvashnin does not forgive those who do not fear him."
