= 2000 Zhani-Vedeno ambush =

2000 ambush during the Second Chechen War

- Part of the Second Chechen War
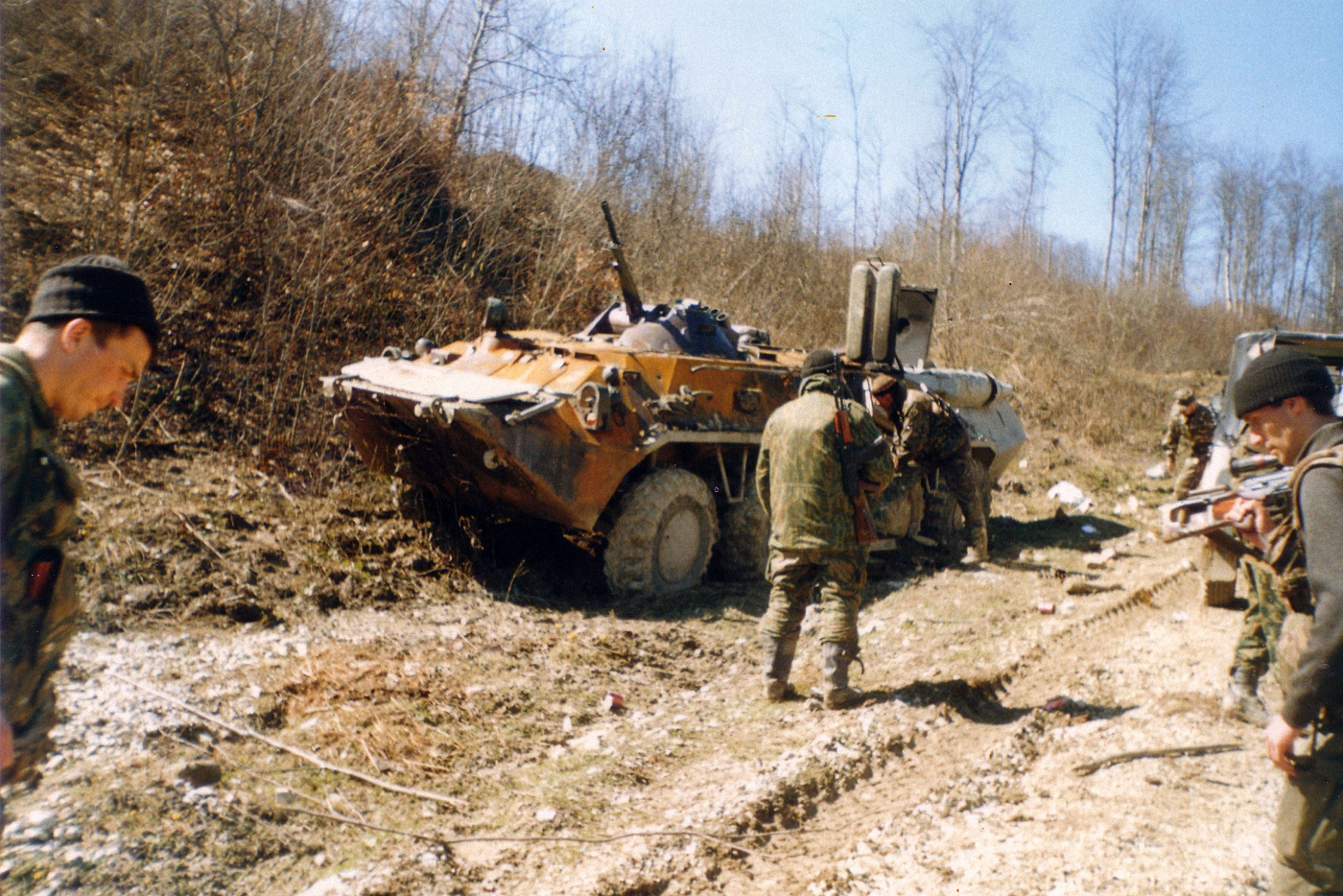
- A BTR-80 armored personnel carrier disabled by Chechen militants during the ambush.
Date	29 March 2000
Location	Near Zhani-Vedeno, Chechnya
Result	Chechen victory

Belligerents
Russia	Islamic International Brigade

Commanders and leaders
(Russia) Valentin Simonov †	Ibn al-Khattab; Abu Quteiba

Strength
41 OMON Military police + 7 MVD soldiers 2 BTR-80s (ambush); 107 OMON Troops, unknown number of vehicles (reinforcements)	unknown

Casualties and losses
40+ killed 15 wounded 11 captured (9 later executed)	Unknown

The 2000 Zhani-Vedeno ambush took place on March 29, 2000, when a mechanized column of special Russian Military Police troops was ambushed in the southern Vedensky District of Chechnya. As the result of the attack on the convoy and on Russian relief forces, scores of Russian special police and paramilitary troops were killed or captured. Forty OMON officers in the column and six in a relief column were killed and eleven more were taken hostage, nine of whom were executed soon after Russian command refused to swap them for the arrested Russian commander Yuri Budanov.

== Ambush ==
On the morning of 29 March 2000, a Russian Military Police force led by Major Valentin Simonov, consisting of some 48 men according to the Russian account (41 of them were members of the OMON special police from Perm Krai, mostly from the city of Berezniki, and the rest were attached Chechen policemen and Internal Troops paramilitary soldiers), was on its way to conduct a so-called "clearing" (zachistka) operation in the village of Tsentoroi in Chechnya's southern highlands near Vedeno, travelling in a column of two BTR-series wheeled armoured personnel carriers and heavy-duty military trucks. A Russian airborne unit that was stationed nearby intercepted a rebel communication regarding the preparations for the ambush, but failed to warn the convoy (possibly on purpose, given the widespread loathing of OMON in Russia and especially in the context of Chechen conflict).

At about 7 or 8 am MSK, the column stopped after one of the trucks broke down before entering the ambush site. Major Valentin decided to personally check a bombed-out house nearby and accidentally discovered a small group of rebel fighters hiding there. He was the first to be killed, shot dead as he entered the door (an OMON officer recording this scene with a video camera was also shot just seconds after). Once the firing started, more rebels, who were hiding nearby in the undergrowth and behind trees, encircled the column and joined the attack. They blew up the truck transporting grenade launchers and ammunition with an RPG shot and pinned down the rest of the convoy in a hail of gunfire and grenades. Some of the Russians ran and hid in the nearby forest. The rebels killed everyone in one separated BTR (which had continued to drive on prior to the attack) and captured the vehicle intact, but later abandoned and burned it.

Rocket strafing attacks by Russian attack helicopters, apparently unaware that some of their own men were hiding in the forest, failed to dislodge the rebels. A second Perm OMON column of 107 troops was then sent to the rescue from the Interior Ministry base in Vedeno, but was itself attacked by more rebels on Height 817, located 500 metres (1,600 ft) from the ambush site. Six troops in the relief column were killed and fifteen wounded before the relief mission was called off. Radio contact with the trapped convoy was lost at 2:30 pm. Some injured Russians killed themselves with their own grenades, eleven were captured, while five managed to hide or escape.

== Aftermath ==
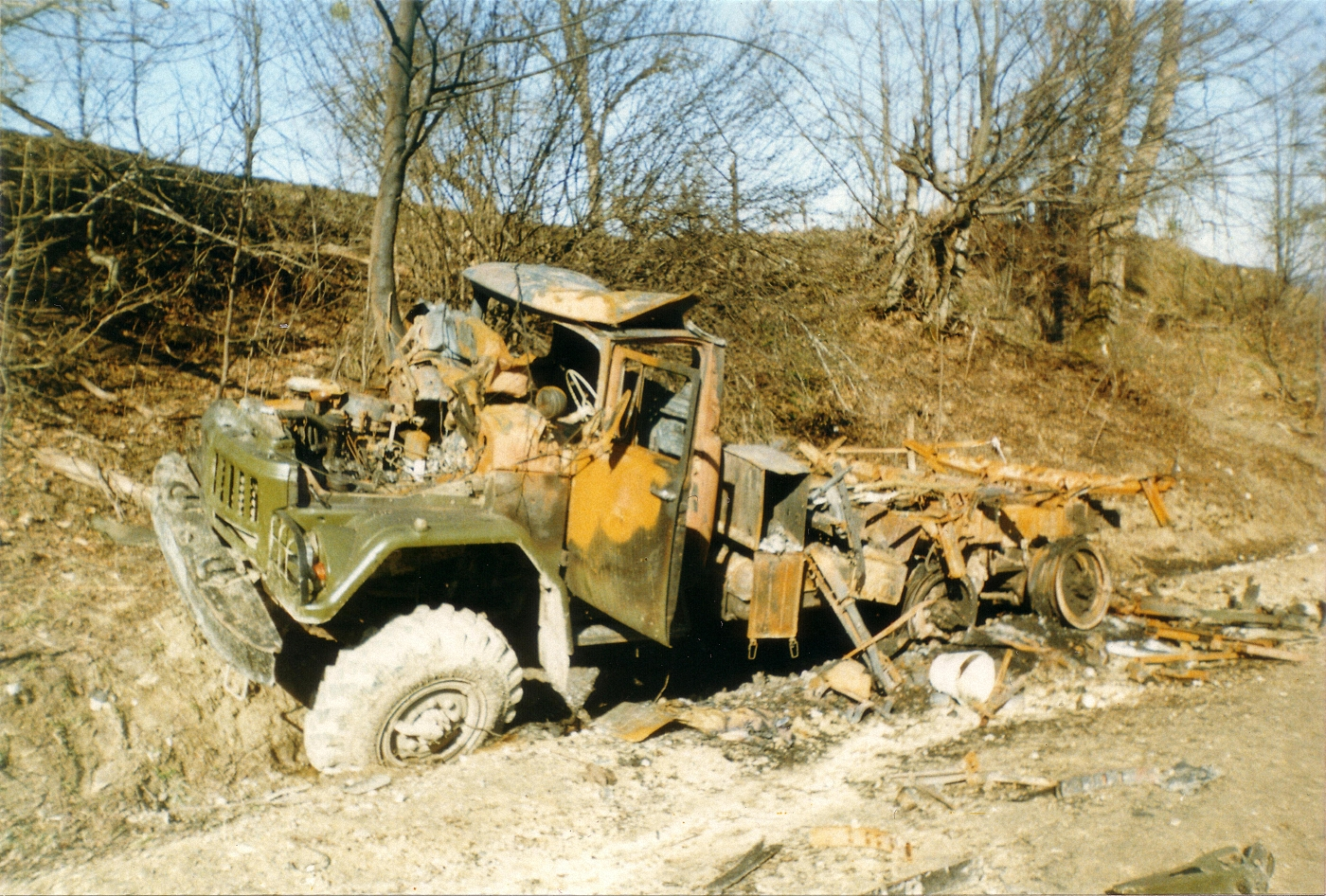
A destroyed ZIL-131 armored truck.

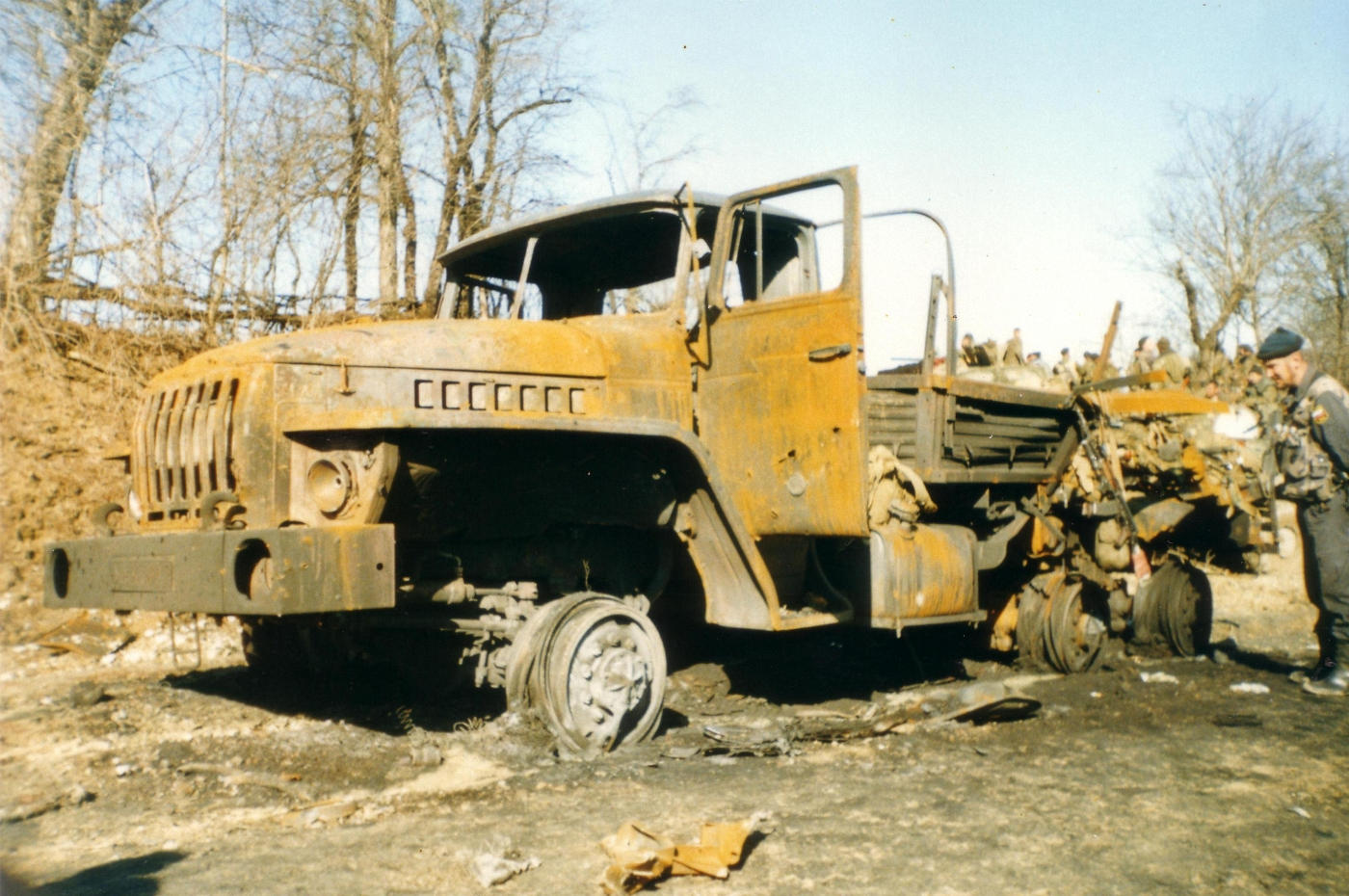
A Ural-4320 truck disabled by militants.

At first, Russian officials attempted to hide the losses. On the same day, Russian Interior Minister Vladimir Rushailo claimed that the situation in Chechnya "is being fully controlled" by Russian forces. Despite the fact that only five soldiers got away, the Kremlin's Chechnya spokesman, Sergei Yastrzhembsky, told reporters that "of the 49 troops who were in the column yesterday, 16 are alive and doing well. They are absolutely safe now." Russian units managed to secure the former battlefield two days later, on the afternoon of 31 March. They spent the next two days collecting the booby-trapped corpses, many of them reportedly mutilated. One badly wounded OMON officer was also found alive three days after the ambush.

The Chechens had executed nine of their prisoners, publicly shooting them on the morning of 4 April 2000. According to the statement, the prisoners were shot because the Russians had refused an offer to exchange them for Russian unit commander Yuri Budanov, who was arrested in Russia on charges of raping and killing an 18-year-old Chechen woman named Elza Kungayeva. On 30 April, their corpses were found near the village of Dargo, reportedly beheaded and shot. Meanwhile, three officers from the elite unit Alpha Group of the FSB were killed by a land mine during the search for the hostages.

Mikhail Labunets, commander of the North Caucasus Internal Troops District, accused an airborne regiment stationed in Vedeno of failing to come to the rescue and said it was almost impossible for OMON units to secure proper air and fire support because of the long-standing enmity between the federal army and the military police. Interior Minister Rushailo flew to Chechnya on 4 April to assess the allegations and ordered a full investigation. Russian Defence Minister Igor Sergeyev blamed "a lack of firm, centralised command", while the commander of the airborne troops, General Gennady Troshev, alleged an act of treason. In another controversy, Major Simonov's widow Nadya shocked the generals by refusing to accept the medal her husband had been awarded posthumously for his role in the battle, protesting the war in Chechnya.

According to the investigation, the ambush was conducted by a multinational fighting group that was led by a Saudi-born Arab field commander known as Abu Quteiba and belonged to the Islamic International Brigade forces of Amir Ibn Khattab. It was composed mostly of men hailing from the "Wahhabi" Dagestani village of Karamakhi, which declared self-rule in the late 1990s and was destroyed by federal troops during a crackdown on Islamic separatism in the republic in 1999. Seven suspected former members of this formation (including four former residents of Karamakhi and natives of Tatarstan and Karachay-Cherkessia) were later arrested and tried together by Dagestan's Supreme Court. In 2001, five were convicted for directly participating in the attack. The court's ruling was based on the statements given by two of the accused and then withdrawn at the start of the trial, when they said they had made them under threat of torture by FSB investigators.

OMON officer Sergei Udachin (or Sergei Sobyanin in some reports) died when he was shot while filming with his video camcorder. A rebel fighter later picked up his camera and used it to document the rebel side of the conflict, including for the purposes of recording killed and captured Russian troops. Eventually, footage of the attack became public when CNN discovered it, and broadcast it for the first time as part of its documentary program Deadlock: Russia's Forgotten War in 2002. The program also included interviews with Russian survivors of the incident.
