= Aydamir Abalayev =

Minister of Internal Affairs of the Chechen Republic of Ichkeria
- In office 1998–2002

Personal details
- Born: 1964 Nozhay-Yurtovsky District, Checheno-Ingush ASSR, Soviet Union
- Died: 1 May 2002 (aged 36–37) Nozhay-Yurtovsky District, Chechen Republic of Ichkeria
- Awards: Qoman Siy

Military service
- Allegiance: Chechen Republic of Ichkeria
- Years of service: 1994–2002
- Rank: brigadier general
- Battles/wars: First Chechen War; Second Chechen War

Aydamir Timurovich Abalayev (Russian: Айдамир Тимурович Абалаев; 1964 – 1 May 2002) was Minister of the Interior and Minister of Shariah Security of the Chechen Republic of Ichkeria, who took part in the First and Second Chechen War.

Abalayev was killed in a shootout on 1 May 2002 after he refused to surrender and fought an unequal battle.
