= Isa Astamirov =

Chechen politician and militant (1952–2000)

Minister of Economy of the Chechen Republic of Ichkeria
- In office 3 June 1997 – 23 October 1997

Personal details
- Born: 1952 Kazakhstan, Soviet Union
- Died: 23 January 2000 (aged 47–48) Grozny, Chechen Republic of Ichkeria
- Awards: Qoman Siy

Military service
- Allegiance: Chechen Republic of Ichkeria
- Years of service: 1994–2000
- Rank: Brigadier general
- Battles/wars: First Chechen War; Second Chechen War

Isa Ibragimovich Astamirov (Russian: Иса Ибрагимович Астемиров; 1952 – 23 January 2000) was Minister of Economy of the Chechen Republic of Ichkeria and a brigadier general of the Chechen armed forces who took part in the First and Second Chechen Wars. Isa was of the Terloy teip.

Astamirov died at the beginning of the Second Chechen War in the Battle for Grozny.
