= Pasikhat Dzhukalayeva =

Russian longevity claimant (1881–2005)

Pasikhat Dzukalayeva
- Пасихат Джукалаева
- Dzukalayeva in 2004
- Born: 1881? Tazbichi, Itum-Kale, Russian Empire
- Died: 2005 (aged 123–124); Grozny, Chechnya, Russian Federation
- Known for: Claims to being a supercentenarian and the oldest person in Chechnya

Pasikhat Dzhukalayeva (Russian and Chechen: Пасиха́т Джукала́ева; c. 1881–2005) was an alleged super-centenarian from Chechnya.

== Biography ==
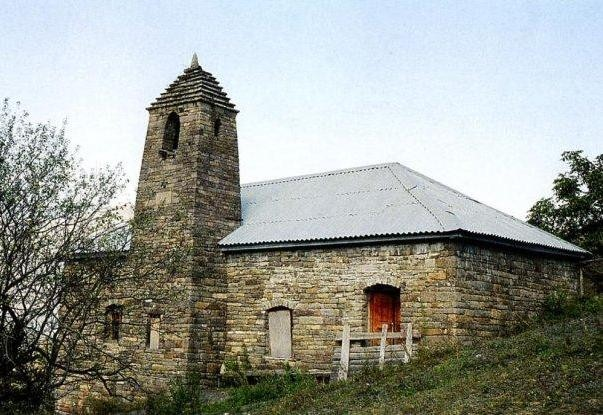
Ancient mosque in Tazbichi, where Dzhukalayeva was born

Dzhukalayeva was born in the village of Tazbichi^{[ru]} in the Itum-Kale region in 1881 and grew up there. At 19 years old she married her husband, Vaid, who was also from Itum-Kale. They had two sons and four daughters. Dzhukalayeva heard about the 1917 Revolution months later when her husband went to sell wood in Grozny.

In February 1944, Dzukalayeva, along with all other Chechens, was deported to Kazakhstan; on the journey her daughter Pesy died, but they were unable to bury her. They settled in Emba, Dzhurun district of Aktobe. Dzhukalayeva returned to Chechnya years later and settled in Grozny.

During her life she witnessed huge changes to Chechnya and remembered the Russian Revolution, the Second World War, resettlement to Kazakhstan and both Chechen wars. She considered Russia to be a different country and wanted peace for Chechnya. Towards the end of her life she lived with her grand-daughter, but had an extended family of nine grandchildren, eighteen great-grandchildren and seven great-great-grandchildren. Her elder sister Asho was also reportedly a super-centenarian. She died in Grozny in 2005.

== Legacy ==
Prior to her death Dzhukalayeva was recognized in Russia as the oldest woman in Chechnya. Her achievement was listed in the Divo Book of Records of Russia.

In 2010, artist Zareta Murtazalieva painted a portrait of Dzhukalayeva as part of an exhibition celebrating Chechen women at the National Museum of the Chechen Republic.
