= Guerrilla phase of the Second Chechen War (2003) =

Part of a Russian war in the Caucasus

== Timeline ==
The Russian military stated that 291 Russian soldiers were killed in Chechnya in 2003.

=== January ===
- January 9 - Eighteen Russian troops and two insurgents were killed in the fighting in Chechnya, including nine soldiers who died when their convoy came under fire in the Chechen capital Grozny.
- January 11 - Four Russian servicemen were killed in clashes, while four soldiers died when their vehicles struck land mines.

=== February ===
- February 2 - Chechen rebel attacks and mines killed five Russian servicemen and wounded eight.
- February 7 - Rebel attacks and land mines killed 10 soldiers and police in Chechnya.

=== March ===
- March 1 - Shamil Basayev's men attacked the motorcade of Chechnya's pro-Moscow leader, Akhmad Kadyrov, killing his four bodyguards and three policemen. One Chechen rebel was also killed.
- March 5 - Pro-Russian Chechen commander Dzhabrail Yamadayev was killed in his own house in the village of Dyshne-Vedeno by a bomb planted under a couch that he slept on.
- March 9 - Russian armored personnel carriers opened fire in Staraya Sunzha, killing 2 Chechen policemen.
- "Six Russian servicemen were killed and 10 wounded by rebel gunfire or mines in Chechnya". Milwaukee Journal Sentinel. March 17, 2003.
- March 22 - Dozens of Chechen rebels surrendered their weapons in a propaganda ceremony.
- March 28 - Chechen rebels killed six Russian soldiers and two special policemen.

=== April ===
- April 1 - At least five Russian soldiers and two policemen were killed and three soldiers wounded in rebel attacks in Chechnya. Meanwhile, a mine blast in a neighboring republic killed four Russian soldiers and wounded another.
- April 3 - Seven policemen died in a rebel attack on a motorcade in which Chechnya's pro-Moscow administration chief, Akhmad Kadyrov, travelled.
- April 6 - Chechen rebels killed four servicemen and wounded 10 others in attacks.
- April 8 - A Russian armored personnel carrier hit a land mine and exploded in Grozny, killing and injuring several soldiers.
- April 10 - Six Russian troops and one local police officer were killed in Chechnya, while two other policemen were kidnapped.
- April 11 - Six Russian servicemen died in a guerrilla attack on a convoy near the village of Samashki.
- April 15 - Videotaped double remote-controlled mine attack on a bus in Grozny killed up to 17 Interior Ministry personnel (civilians according to the official version). Three other mine blasts in Grozny wounded seven servicemen.
- April 17: Two special policemen were killed and three wounded when their car was attacked with grenade launchers in Grozny's Oktyabrsky district. A mine explosion wounded four personnel of the FSB traveling by car in Grozny.
- April 20 - Chechen rebels opened fire on Russian troops in several clashes, killing seven soldiers and wounding seven others.

=== May ===
- May 12 - Suicide bombers drive a truck bomb into a government administration and security complex in Znamenskoye in northern Chechnya, killing about 50 and injuring around 400, including civilians. The blast destroyed the republican headquarters of the FSB.
- May 30 - Two Russian soldiers were killed and five wounded in an ambush in Ingushetia near the border with Chechnya, and three more servicemen were wounded when a mine exploded under a relief column. Three other soldiers were also killed in two attacks in Chechnya.

=== June ===
- "Five Russian soldiers dead and 11 others wounded in a rebel ambush in Ingushetia and other attacks in the region". Milwaukee Journal Sentinel. June 1, 2003.
- June 5 - A female suicide bomber ambushed a bus carrying Russian Air Force pilots in North Ossetia, blowing it up and killing herself and 19 other people, including seven civilians, and injuring 14.
- June 6 - Russian forces and pro-Moscow police clashed with rebels in the town of Argun. Eight federal servicemen were killed, reportedly including deputy military commandant for Chechnya Avud Yusupov. The rebels too suffered casualties.
- June 7 - A car bomb parked on a roadside killed three and injured two OMON paramilitary officers in Grozny.
- June 20 - A suicide truck bomb explosion near a Ministry of Justice building in Grozny wounded about 40 people, including seven seriously.
- June 23 - Three servicemen were killed and six wounded in Chechnya, while two rebels were also killed.
- June 25 - Eight Russian soldiers and one police officer have been killed in clashes with Chechen guerrillas, who themselves lost two men. Russian air attacks struck suspected rebel camps in the southern Vedeno district, and artillery pounded the Vedeno, Itum-Kale and Kurchaloyevsky Districts.

=== July ===
- July 6 - Chechen rebels kill at least 10 Russian servicemen, including three in a shot-down a Mi-8 military helicopter, while federal forces shelled several regions and detained at least 150 people in a series of sweeps throughout the republic.
- July 9 - Three attacks by the guerrillas killed five Russian soldiers and three policemen.
- July 12 - Insurgents in southern Chechnya staged several hit-and-run attacks against federal positions, killing 16 soldiers and wounding 13. Nine of them were killed and five seriously wounded in a heavy KamAZ truck at the head of a convoy returning to base in the Shatoy region, when it hit a remote-controlled land mine and was attacked with small arms and grenades.
- July 18 - Three people killed and 38 injured, including civilians, in an explosion of a bomb planted near the police station in Khasavyurt, Dagestan.
- July 21 - Six Russian soldiers were killed and eight wounded in an overnight clash with separatist fighters near the village of Dyshne-Vedeno. The Russian military said six Chechen fighters were also killed in the gunfight. A mine explosion in western Chechnya killed one and severely injured four special policemen from Rostov-on-Don.
- July 27 - An unidentified woman blows herself and a female civilian up at a security checkpoint in Grozny.
- July 29 - A land mine explosion shattered a military convoy near the border with Chechnya, killing five Russian soldiers.
- July 31 - Four federal servicemen were killed and eight wounded in mine explosions and firefights with rebel guerrillas.

=== August ===
- August 1 - A suicide bomber driving a truck packed with explosives blew up a military hospital in the town of Mozdok in North Ossetia. The blast killed at least 44 people, including 12 civilians, and wounded 79 others. Many of the soldiers who had been in the hospital were recovering from wounds suffered in Chechnya.
- August 7 - Chechen rebels shot down a Russian military helicopter in the mountains using a shoulder-fired missile, killing the crew of three. Rebels also ambushed a Russian military convoy near the border with Chechnya, killing six soldiers and wounding seven.
- August 10 - Eight Russian soldiers and police died in rebel attacks in a day of violence throughout Chechnya.
- August 15 - A remote-controlled mine killed five Russian soldiers conducting a search operation in Chechnya. Chechen rebels also fired automatic weapons and lobbed grenades at a military commander's office, killing two soldiers and wounding 10.
- August 19 - Fighting persisted in Chechnya, with six Russian servicemen killed and 11 others wounded.
- August 20 - Fighting in Chechnya left eight Russian soldiers and 12 rebels dead.
- August 21 - Nine Russian soldiers were killed and two wounded by a remote-controlled car bomb, which went off as a column of military vehicles drove by. The bomb blew up as a column of military vehicles drove by, destroying a ZIL-131 truck.
- August 24 - Six federal soldiers were killed and nine wounded in the three attacks by rebels in Chechnya.
- August 28 - Three servicemen of the federal interior ministry died in a firefight with rebel forces in the village of Sernovodsk in western Chechnya.

=== September ===
- September 3 - At least five people were killed and more than 20 wounded in southern Russia when two bombs blew up under a commuter train on 3 September 2003, Russian and international media reported. The explosion occurred near Kislovodsk in Stavropol Krai.

=== October ===
- October 28 - Chechen rebels killed eight Russian soldiers in a series of attacks.

=== November ===
- November 3 - Nine Russian soldiers were killed and 16 wounded by attacks and mines laid by Chechen separatists. The Russian military responded by pounding the southern Vedeno district from the air and shelling suspected separatist bases, and detained at least 180 people on suspicion of aiding the separatists.
- November 15 - Another soldier was killed and five wounded in rebel attacks on Russian outposts over the past 24 hours.
- November 16 - Two Russian servicemen were killed and another two wounded in a clash with rebels in southern Chechnya.
- November 23 - Seventeen militants were killed by a Russian special forces in a raid on a base near the Chechen village of Serzhen-Yurt. The Kremlin later displayed passports belonging to an Algerian, three Turks and Thomas Fischer, a German, who were among the dead.

=== December ===
- December 14 - Nine Russian border guards are killed in a raid by 25-30 Chechen fighters on Dagestan.
- December 14 - Ten Russian servicemen were killed in rebel attacks.
- December 23 - The Russian military said it has killed 12 Chechen rebels in Dagestan.
