= Guerrilla phase of the Second Chechen War (2004) =

Part of a Russian war in the Caucasus

== Timeline ==
=== January ===
- January 8 - Eight Russian servicemen were killed in firefights or mine explosions in Chechnya, while the security forces seized at least 120 people on suspicions of rebel activity.

=== February ===
- February 5 - Seven Russian servicemen were killed and at least 11 wounded in the rebel attacks in Chechnya.
- February 9 - Rebel attacks and land mines in Chechnya killed at least nine Russian servicemen and local pro-Moscow police.
- February 27 - Four Russian soldiers were killed and four wounded in a rebel attack on a Russian military convoy in Chechnya.
- February 28 - Chechen rebel commander Ruslan Gelayev and two Russian border guards killed each other on the Russian-Georgian border.

=== March ===
- March 2 - Rebel attacks and land mines in Chechnya killed five Russian soldiers.
- March 25 - Rebel attacks claimed the lives of 11 soldiers and policemen. In another incident, military truck drove out of a Russian military base in Shali after curfew and hit a minefield planted outside to deter a guerrilla attack, killing eight to ten soldiers.

=== April ===
- April 4 - Guerrilla attacks across Chechnya killed six people on the Russian side and injured five, while two rebel fighters were captured in the capital Grozny.
- April 5 - Rebel attacks across Chechnya killed six Russian soldiers.
- April 13 - Eleven Russian soldiers killed and 15 wounded in Chechnya, including five killed in a convoy shelled near Shali.
- April 15 - Ten Russian soldiers died and five were wounded in attacks throughout Chechnya, while over 200 people were detained in a security sweeps for suspected insurgents and accomplices.
- April 16 - Saudi Arabia-born Abu al-Walid, successor to Ibn al-Khattab in the post of commander of the foreign fighters, was killed in the mountains by a Russian aerial bombing.

=== May ===
- May 9 - An explosion on the VIP seating at a Dinamo soccer stadium during a mid-morning Soviet Victory Day parade in the Grozny kills pro-Russian President of the Chechen Republic Akhmad Kadyrov and more than dozen others. Some 56 others were wounded, including Colonel-General Valery Baranov, the chief commander of Russian forces in Chechnya.
- May 17 - Chechen separatists killed 12 Russian soldiers and policemen and wounded four in a double ambush near the city of Urus-Martan. At least seven Russian servicemen were killed and six wounded in other attacks in Chechnya, most of them in two mine blasts in Grozny.
- May 22 - Seven Russian soldiers and one Chechen police officer died in action against the rebels in Chechnya.

=== June ===
- June 4 - Four contract soldiers killed and five wounded, including a senior officer, in the attack against army headquarters convoy in the village of Itum-Kale.
- June 8 - Officials in Chechnya said that at least 10 Russian servicemen and eight insurgents died in several clashes, while about 200 people were detained on suspicion of aiding the rebels.
- June 19 - Rebel attacks in Chechnya killed seven Russian soldiers and police officers.
- June 21 - Chechen guerrillas led the raid on the Russian republic of Ingushetia, killing at least 60 members of the local security agencies, including the republic's acting interior minister, and looting and burning down the Ingushetia's Interior Ministry and several other government buildings.
- June 28 - Four servicemen were killed and six wounded in a clash in the Achkhoy-Martan district and two mine blasts in Chechnya.

=== July ===
- July 10 - Five Russian troops were slain in Chechnya by gunfire, while another three died in a mine explosion on the road near Itum-Kale.
- July 12 - Guerrillas entered and shortly seized the village of Avtury, killing at least 18 and capturing 12 members of pro-Moscow Chechen police and militia. At least five separatist fighters were also killed and two went missing in the fighting.
- July 16 - Seven Russian soldiers were killed and five wounded in Chechnya. During the same period federal troops detained at least 150 Chechen suspects in the security sweeps.
- July 24 - A total of at least 12 Russian troops had died in these attacks and in mine explosions in Chechnya. A bomb planted in his car killed Yaragi Nikayev, a senior police officer in Grozny.
- July 30 - Four Russian servicemen were killed and two others seriously injured in an attack on a Russian military truck in Galashki, Ingushetia.

=== August ===
- August 12 - Eight Russian soldiers were killed and 11 wounded in separate attacks.
- August 22 - Overnight attacks in central Grozny killed some 58 members of security forces, five federal soldiers and more than a dozen civilians. At least one insurgent was killed and three captured.

=== September ===
- September 1–3 Rebels attack Beslan School, more than 1,100 hostages remained inside. After a series of bombs set off by rebels, over 300 hostages and attackers are killed

=== October ===
- October 12 - A car bomb killed 15 people near a police administrative building in Grozny where Russian passports were being given to local inhabitants.

=== November ===
- November 8 - Chechnya's administration said Russian troops killed at least 18 separatist fighters in Vedensky District. Chechen rebel death toll was one of the highest reported by the pro-Moscow authorities in months.

=== December ===
- December 14 - Four officers of the Federal Drug Control Service killed in an attack in Nalchik, Kabardino-Balkaria.
