= Gennady Shpigun =

Russian general (1947–2000)

Gennady Nikolaevich Shpigun
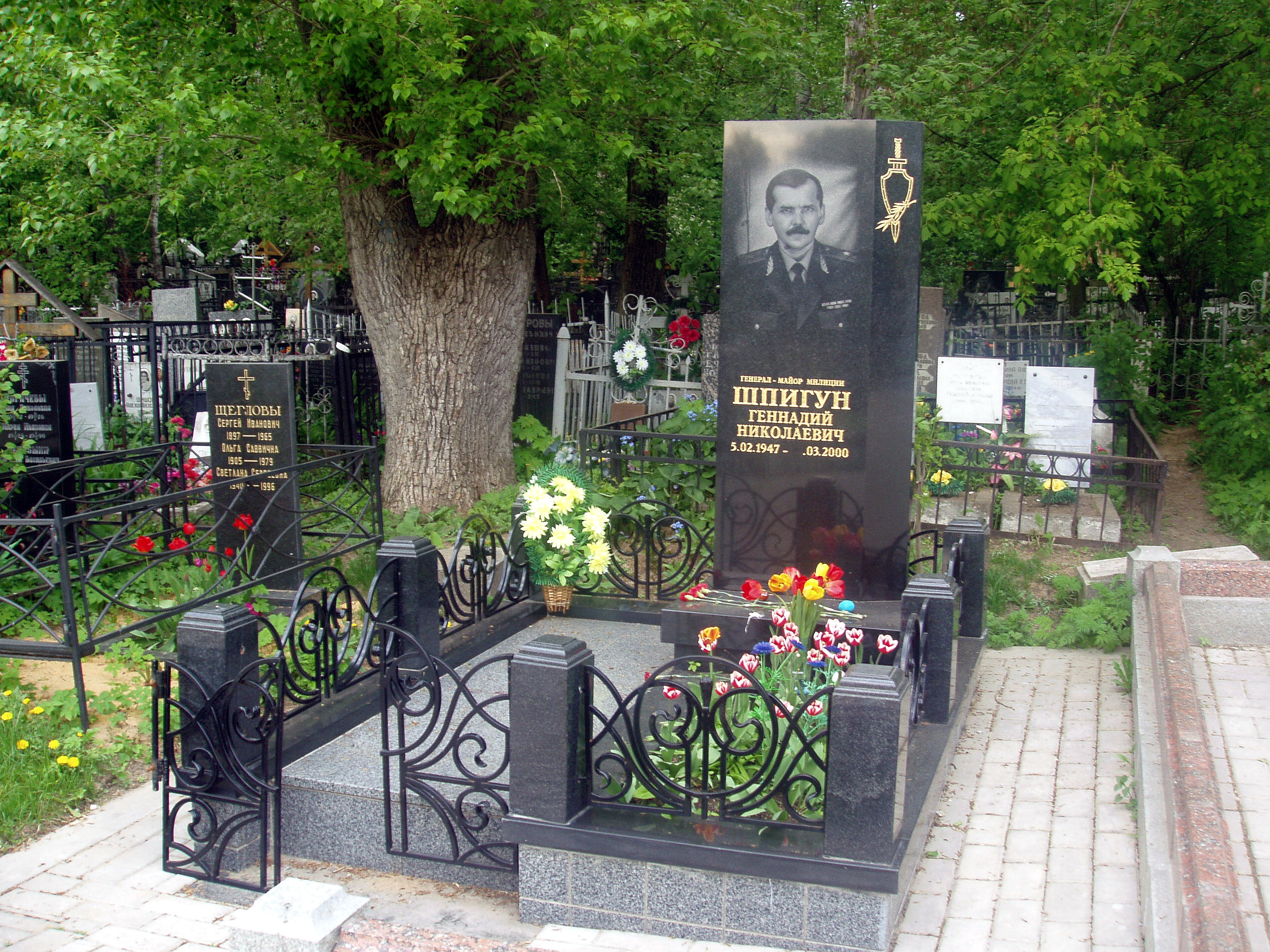
- Gennady Spigun's grave in Preobrazhenskoe Cemetery
- Native name: Геннадий Николаевич Шпигун
- Born: February 5, 1947; Babayurt, Babayurtovsky District, Dagestan Autonomous Soviet Socialist Republic, RSFSR, USSR
- Died: March 2000 (aged 53) Itum-Kalinsky District, Chechen Republic, Russian Federation
- Buried: Preobrazhenskoe Cemetery, Moscow
- Allegiance: Soviet Union→ Russia
- Branch: Ministry of Internal Affairs
- Service years: 1984–2000
- Rank: Major General
- Conflicts: First Chechen War

General Gennady Nikolayevich Shpigun (Russian: Геннадий Николаевич Шпигун; February 5, 1947 – ca. March 2000) was the Russian Interior Ministry's special representative in Chechnya.

He was kidnapped from the airport in Grozny on March 5, 1999, when armed masked men boarded his plane as it was about to leave for Moscow. Shpigun's kidnappers, reported at various times to be different Chechen rebel warlords (Shamil Basaev, Arbi Barayev, Magomed Khatuev), demanded a ransom of US$15 million for his release.

On March 31, 2000, his body was found in southern Chechnya, near the village of Itum-Kale. Neither the exact cause nor the date of his death could be determined. In June 2000, he was buried in Moscow's Preobrazhenskoe Cemetery.
