= Guerrilla phase of the Second Chechen War (2002) =

Part of a Russian war in the Caucasus

== Timeline ==
The Russian military stated that 480 Russian soldiers were killed in Chechnya in 2002.

=== January ===
- January 3 - Six-day fighting in Tsotsin-Yurt claimed around 100 rebels killed according to Moscow, and 40 Russians were killed according to the Chechen separatists. Five Russian troops were killed in the other attacks across Chechnya.
- January 17 - More than 30 Russian servicemen reportedly died in separate attacks on troop columns in the Vedeno and Urus-Martan districts.
- January 19 - Seven Russian Internal Troops have died and three were wounded in an explosion of a remote-controlled mine in Dagestan. Rebel attacks in Chechnya killed eight troops and injured nine, while the military detained 86 people on suspicion of participating in rebel formation during a series of security sweeps.
- January 27 - A Russian Interior Ministry Mi-8 was shot down in Nadterechny District, killing 14 people including crew. Among those killed in the crash were Russian deputy interior minister, Lieutenant-General Mikhail Rudchenko, responsible for security in the Southern Federal District, and Major-General Nikolai Goridov, deputy commander of the Internal Troops, as well as several other high-ranking officers including colonels Oriyenko, Stepanenko, and Trafimov.

=== March ===
- March 19 - One of the leaders of the Chechen resistance and the influential Arab volunteer, Ibn al-Khattab, was killed by a poisoned letter in an operation by the Federal Security Service (FSB).

=== April ===
- April 6 - Five Russian soldiers have been killed in Chechnya when their armoured vehicle detonated a mine outside Grozny.
- April 14 - Russia forces have launched a major operation in southern Chechnya involving aircraft and heavy guns against the Vedensky District after the Chechen guerrillas claimed the lives of nine Russian servicemen in explosions and hit-and-run tactics attacks.
- April 17 - Two attacks in the southern Shatoysky District killed 11 Russian servicemen and wounded 13.
- April 18 - Insurgents killed 21 and wounded seven Chechen OMON officers in the attack on a convoy in Grozny.

=== July ===
- July 5 - Rebel ambushes in Chechnya killed 11 Russian soldiers and police officers.
- July 8 - Two soldiers and six police officers were killed in clashes with Chechen rebels, while the Russian troops detained 90 people for questioning over suspected ties to insurgents.
- July 16 - Separatist fighters attacked Russian army convoys and checkpoints in Chechnya, killing six.

=== August ===
- August 6 - A land mine exploded under a military truck that was transporting 33 local servicemen back to their barracks in the town of Shatoy, killing 11 Chechen policemen and badly wounded seven.
- August 17 - Russian troops battled with Chechen rebels who attacked a number of villages in southern Chechnya in fighting that has left at least nine soldiers dead.
- August 19 - An overloaded Mi-26 transport helicopter was hit by an Igla missile and crashed into a mine field, killing some 127 soldiers aboard, the greatest loss of life in the history of helicopter aviation. The Russian military command said that federal forces have killed 39 Chechen fighters in the past two days; the report could not be independently confirmed.
- August 23 - Eight soldiers were killed in Chechnya.
- August 31 - A Russian helicopter was downed by a missile in Chechnya, killing two.

=== September ===
- September 10 - Administrative head of the Nadterechny District, Akhmad Zavgayev (brother of Doku Zavgayev), was killed as unknown gunmen opened fire his car in his home village of Beno-Yurt, several kilometers away from Chechnya's border with North Ossetia.
- September 15 - Fighting killed 12 Russian servicemen and one rebel, while more than 100 suspected rebels were detained in security sweeps.
- September 26 - Ruslan Gelayev's forces raided into Ingushetia, capturing the villages of Tarskoe and then Galashki. Gelayev's 150 fighters, including 30 Kabardians and Balkars, became surrounded, took large losses and were dispersed. According to the Russian officials, at least 17 Russian servicemen, including two Mi-24 pilots, and as many as 76 rebels were reported killed in clashes.

=== October ===
- October 10 - A bomb attack on a Grozny police station killed 25 Chechen policemen, including many senior officers, and wounded nine. It is suspected that one of the policemen was responsible for planting the bomb, which went off during the conference of 40 Grozny police commanders.
- October 29 - A Mi-8 shot down by the rebels explodes during attempted emergency landing, killing all four people on board.
- October 31 - Chechen rebels killed six Russian servicemen, a Chechen policeman and a local administrator

=== November ===
- November 3 - Rebels shoot down a Mi-8 helicopter with a portable ground-to-air missile near Grozny, killing nine servicemen.
- November 15 - An official in the Chechen administration said that 12 federal service personnel and allied Chechen militiamen were killed.
- November 16 - Lieutenant-General Igor Shifrin, head of the Army's Glavspetzstroi (Main Directorate of Special Construction), was killed in ambush in Grozny when his and another vehicle came under intense fire from automatic weapons. Several other people were reported killed and wounded in the firefight, and at least 220 people were detained by Russian forces.
- November 29 - Five Russian servicemen and a paramilitary policeman were killed in clashes with rebels and from mine explosions in Chechnya.

=== December ===
- December 25–28 guerrillas laid down their weapons in Grozny. At least four Russians were killed.
- December 27 - Chechen suicide bombers drove two bomb vehicles into the heavily guarded republic's government complex in Grozny, killing 72 people and injuring some 210.
- December 30 - Four members of pro-Moscow forces were killed in the attacks in Grozny.
