= Tsentaroy =

Tsentaroy (Russian: Центарой) is the name of several rural localities in the Chechen Republic, Russia:

- Tsentaroy, Kurchaloyevsky District, Chechen Republic, now Akhmat-Yurt, a selo in Tsentoroyevskaya Rural Administration of Kurchaloyevsky District
- Tsentaroy, Nozhay-Yurtovsky District, Chechen Republic, a selo in Tsentoroyevskaya Rural Administration of Nozhay-Yurtovsky District
