= Itum-Kale =

Rural locality in Chechnya, Russia

Itum-Kale Итум-Кале Chechen: Итон-Кхаьлла
- Village
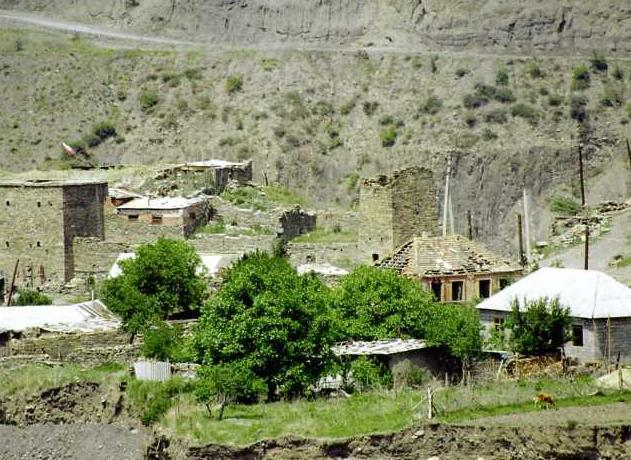
- A tower in Itum-Kale
- Interactive map of Itum-Kale
- Location of Itum-Kale Itum-Kale (Chechnya)
- Coordinates: 42°44′08″N 45°34′33″E
- Country: Russia
- Federal subject: Chechnya
- Administrative district: Itum-Kalinsky district
- Elevation: 717 m (2,352 ft)

Population
  - Estimate (2010): 1,068 )
- Time zone: UTC+3 (MSK)
- Postal code: 87164
- OKTMO ID: 96611410101

Itum-Kale (Russian: Итум-Кале, Chechen: Итон-Кхаьлла, Iton-Qälla), also spelled as Itum-Kali (Russian: Итум-Кали) is a rural locality (a selo) and the administrative center of Itum-Kalinsky District, the Chechen Republic, Russia. Population: 1,068 (2010 census); 2,916 (2002 census); In 1944 the area's Chechen inhabitants were deported on the order of Joseph Stalin and the area transferred to Georgia; this decision was reversed in the late 1950s and the Chechens who had survived were allowed to return.

== Events in the Second Chechen War ==
During the 1999-2000 siege of Grozny, and after its fall to Russian forces, large numbers of refugees headed toward Georgia through Itum-Kale. In November and December 1999, Russian forces bombarded refugees passing through the town, killing several.

There were clashes between Russian and Chechen forces around Itum-Kale and other nearby villages in mid-February 2000.

On 27 July 2002, during the guerrilla phase of the Second Chechen War, 50 to 60 Chechen fighters launched an attack near Itum-Kale, killing eight soldiers. Russian officials claimed that the attack had been launched from the Pankisi Gorge inside Georgia. Georgia initially denied the claim, but then on 3 and 5 August announced that it had captured 13 Chechens who had survived the fighting at Itum-Kale as they tried to cross back into Georgia. Russia demanded the extradition of the 13 captured fighters, which Georgia refused. The episode formed part of the Pankisi Gorge crisis.

== People from Itum-Kale ==
- Pasikhat Dzhukalaeva - supercentenarian was born nearby.
