= Russian-Chechen Friendship Society =

Finland-based non-governmental organization

The Russian-Chechen Friendship Society (RCFS) is a Finland-based non-governmental organization monitoring the human rights situation in Chechnya and other parts of the North Caucasus. The society produces daily press releases claiming serious human rights violations. At its former main office Nizhny Novgorod, where it produced the Rights Protection newspaper jointly with the Nizhny Novgorod Human Rights Society. The RCFS received the 2004 Recognition Award by the International Helsinki Federation for Human Rights.

In February 2006 the society's director, Stanislav Dmitrievsky, was convicted of incitement to ethnic or racial hatred for publishing articles written by Chechen separatist leaders. In one, Aslan Maskhadov called on the international community to broker negotiations to stop the conflict in Chechnya. In another, Akhmed Zakayev appealed to Russian voters not to reelect President Vladimir Putin and claimed the conflict benefited only Putin. The Society was formally closed by Russian authorities in October 2006 but it continued some of its activities. In January 2007 the Supreme Court of Russia upheld the decision to liquidate the society as an "extremist organization." The organization now maintains its legal presence in Finland.

In January 2007 the society had planned to start hearings on war crimes and human rights abuses allegedly perpetrated in Chechnya, claiming historical precedents for its action, such as the Nuremberg Trials, the U.N.'s International Court of Justice, the international criminal tribunals investigating charges of war crimes committed in Yugoslavia, the Rwanda, Sierra Leone, and Iraq.

In September 2007 the United States boycotted an Organization for Security and Co-operation in Europe conference in Vienna on the victims of terrorism after the RCFS was barred from taking part. A U.S. representative referred to the group as "reputable" and lodged a formal protest over its exclusion.

The society is funded by the National Endowment for Democracy. In 2010 it received a grant of US$49,980 for "expanding and developing a web site".
