= Urus-Martanovsky Jamaat =

Chechen Salafist paramilitary group

- Урус-Мартановский джамаат
- Founder: Ramzan Akhmadov
- Leaders: Ramzan Akhmadov («Khamza») † (1996–2001); Huta Akhmadov («Abdurakhman») † (1996–1999); Rizvan Akhmadov («Dadu») † (2001–2002); Aslan Dukuzov («Saif-Islam») † (2001–2002); Zelimkhan Akhmadov («Zema») † (2002); Magomed Tsagaraev («Nurdin») † (2001); Bislan Sedaev («Khalid») † (2002); Rizvan Varaev † (1999); Apti Abitaev (POW) (2001); Solsbek Shadukaev (POW) (2001); Isa Gelhaev † (2003); Taus Udaev † (2004); Musa Gelhaev † (2004); Ruslan Vakhaev † (2005); Timur Daaev (POW) (2006)
- Dates active: 1996–2006
- Headquarters: Urus-Martan, Chechnya
- Active regions: Chechnya and Dagestan
- Ideology: Salafism
- Size: 2,500 (1999)
- Part of: Chechen Republic of Ichkeria
- Wars: the Chechen–Russian conflict

Urus-Martanovsky Jamaat (Russian: Урус-Мартановский джамаат) was the largest Chechen Salafist paramilitary organization formed by Ramzan Akhmadov at the end of the First Chechen War. The organization controlled the Urus-Martanovsky District and attempted to establish an Islamic state with a Sharia form of government throughout Chechnya. During the Second Chechen War this organisation was the strongest military force in Chechnya, which took part in major military actions against the Russian Armed Forces. Most of the members of this organization were representatives of the Ghendarganoy teip.

== History ==
Formed by Ramzan Akhmadov at the end of the First Chechen War, the organisation became involved in the process of Islamisation of the Chechen Republic of Ichkeria, acting as an opponent of President Maskhadov's secularist policies. In 1998, this confrontation turned into a military conflict that ended with the defeat of Maskhadov's supporters in the battle of Urus-Martan.

The Urus-Martanovsky District, which was under Ramzan Akhmadov's full control, was turned into the centre of Salafism in Chechnya, where Sharia rules were applied and public executions of criminals were carried out.

During the Second Chechen War, the Urus-Martanovsky Jamaat took part in major battles in Argun and Shatoy before turning to guerrilla warfare.

== Leaders ==
Leaders of Urus-Martanovsky Jamaat
Name	Native	Position	Date
Ramzan Akhmadov	Urus-Martan	1st Emir of the Urus-Martanovsky Jamaat	1996–2001
Huta Akhmadov	Urus-Martan	Commander of the Urus-Martanovsky Jamaat	1996–1999
Magomed Tsagaraev	Urus-Martan	Naib of the Urus-Martanovsky Jamaat	1996–2001
Bislan Sedaev	Urus-Martan	Commander of the Urus-Martanovsky Jamaat	1996–2002
Rizvan Varaev	Urus-Martan	Commander of the Urus-Martanovsky Jamaat	1996–2001
Apti Abitaev	Urus-Martan	Commander of the Urus-Martanovsky Jamaat	1996–2001
Solsbek Shadukaev	Tangi-Chu	2nd Emir of the Urus-Martanovsky Jamaat	2001
Aslan Dukuzov	Urus-Martan	3rd Emir of the Urus-Martanovsky Jamaat	2001–2002
Rizvan Akhmadov	Urus-Martan	Naib of the Urus-Martanovsky Jamaat	1996–2002
Zelimkhan Akhmadov	Urus-Martan	Commander of the Urus-Martanovsky Jamaat	2002
Isa Gelhaev	Roshni-Chu	Commander of the Urus-Martanovsky Jamaat	2003
Taus Udaev	Urus-Martan	4th Emir of the Urus-Martanovsky Jamaat	2004
Musa Gelhaev	Roshni-Chu	5th Emir of the Urus-Martanovsky Jamaat	2004
Ruslan Vakhaev	Urus-Martan	6th Emir of the Urus-Martanovsky Jamaat	2005
Timur Daaev	Urus-Martan	7th Emir of the Urus-Martanovsky Jamaat	2006
