= Ahmadov =

Ahmadov (masculine, Azerbaijani: Əhmədov, Russian: Ахмадов) or Ahmadova (feminine, Azerbaijani: Əhmədova, Russian: Ахмадова), is a surname, meaning "son of Ahmad". Notable people with the surname include:

- Aghamirza Ahmadov (1905–1964), Azerbaijani statesman and politician
- Ahmad-Jabir Ahmadov (1942–2021), Azerbaijani professor
- Ali Ahmadov (born 1953), Azerbaijani politician
- Aslan Ahmadov (born 1973), Russian photographer and artist
- Ayshan Ahmadova (born 2000), Azerbaijani footballer
- Elkhan Ahmadov (born 1993), Azerbaijani footballer
- Elshad Ahmadov (born 1970), Azerbaijani footballer and manager
- Emin Ahmadov (born 1986), Azerbaijani sport wrestler
- Franghiz Ahmadova (1928–2011), Azerbaijani operatic soprano and music teacher
- Gular Ahmadova (born 1965), Azerbaijani politician
- Haji Ahmadov (born 1993), Azerbaijani footballer
- Huta Akhmadov (1972–1999), Chechen military leader
- Ilyas Akhmadov (born 1960), Chechen-Kazakh diplomat
- Jamil Ahmadov (1924–1944), Azerbaijani lieutenant
- Manouchehr Ahmadov (born 1992), Tajik footballer
- Mashalla Ahmadov (born 1959), Azerbaijani footballer
- Mokhmad Akhmadov (born 1972), Russian politician
- Nuriyya Ahmadova (1950–2015), Azerbaijani actress
- Ramzan Akhmadov (1970–2001), Chechen brigadier general
- Rashad Ahmadov (born 1981), Azerbaijani taekwondo practitioner
- Riad Ahmadov (1956–1992), Azerbaijani military officer
- Rizvan Akhmadov (1957–2002), Chechen military commander
- Rufat Ahmadov (born 2002), Azerbaijani footballer
- Suleyman Ahmadov (born 1999), Azerbaijani footballer
- Tarlan Ahmadov (born 1971), Azerbaijani footballer
- Vahid Ahmadov (born 1947), Azerbaijani politician
- Yagub Ahmadov (1927–2005), Azerbaijani agronomist, philanthropist and politician
- Zelimkhan Akhmadov (1975–2002), Chechen military commander

== See also ==
- Akhmedov
- Akhmetov
