= Akhmadov brothers =

Group of Chechen militants

- Six Akhmadov brothers who died in 1999-2002
- Movement: Salafi jihadism
- Parents: Adlan Akhmadov (father); Zura Akhmadova (mother)
- Relatives: Isa of Ghendargen
- Awards: (Chechen Republic of Ichkeria) Honor of the Nation (3)
- Website: ahmadov.org

The Akhmadov brothers (Russian: Братья Ахмадовы) were Chechen Salafi leaders and implacable enemies of Russia who took part in the First and Second Chechen Wars.

The Akhmadov brothers (Uvays, Ruslan, Rizvan, Apti, Imran, Abu, Ramzan, Khuta and Zelimkhan) controlled their home city of Urus-Martan during the late 1990s. All nine brothers reportedly fought against Russia.

== Background ==
The Akhmadov family was from teip Ghendargnoy. Khuta and Abu Akhmadov died in 1999. Apti and Ramzan died in 2000 and 2001 respectively whilst, most recently Rizvan and Zelimkhan died in 2002.
