= Akhmedov =

Akhmedov or Ahmedov (feminine: Akhmedova, Ahmedova) is a patronymic surname derived from the male given name Akhmed and literally means Akhmed's. It is taken from the Soviet Union's name changing policy. Notable people with the surname include:

== Akhmedov ==
- Bakhtiyar Akhmedov (born 1987), Russian wrestler
- Farkhad Akhmedov (born 1955), Azerbaijani businessman
- Kamalutdin Akhmedov (born 1986), Russian football player
- Magomed-Rasul Akhmedov (born 1966), Russian football player and coach
- Sukhrab Akhmedov (born 1974), brigade commander in the Russian Naval Infantry
- Omari Akhmedov (born 1987), Russian mixed martial arts fighter
- Murolimzhon Akhmedov (born 1992), Kyrgyzstani international professional football player
- Khan A. Akhmedov (1936–2006), Turkmen politician
- Batyr Akhmedov (born 1990), Russian professional boxer
- Bekhzod Akhmedov (born 1974), Uzbekistani chief executive officer
- Rustam Akhmedov (1943–2025), Uzbek general
- Ibad Akhmedov (born 1975), Belarusian wrestler
- Shukhrat Akhmedov (born 1963), Uzbekistani sport shooter
- Shahriyor Akhmedov (born 1993), Tajik boxer

== Ahmedov ==
- Odil Ahmedov (born 1987), Uzbekistani association football player
- Lyutvi Ahmedov (1930–1997), Bulgarian wrestler
- Ahmed Ahmedov (born 1995), Bulgarian professional footballer
- Yoqub Ahmedov (1938–2025), Soviet actor
- Tinav Ahmedov (born 1971), Russian judoka
- Bobomurat Ahmedov (born 1963), Uzbekistani theoretical physicist and astrophysicist
- Ramin Ahmedov (born 2001), Azerbaijani footballer
- Ismail Ahmedov (1907–1986), 10th Mufti of the Religious Council of the Caucasus
- Khanlar Ahmedov (born 1946), Azerbaijani painter

== Akhmedova/Ahmedova ==
- Nodira Akhmedova (born 2005), Kazakhstani taekwondo practitioner
- Umida Akhmedova (born 1955), Uzbekistani photojournalist
- Semiray Ahmedova (born 1981), Bulgarian-born Luxembourgish architect and politician

== See also ==
- Ahmadov
- Akhmetov
