= Ghendargnoy =

Chechen teip

Ghendargnoy Гендаргной
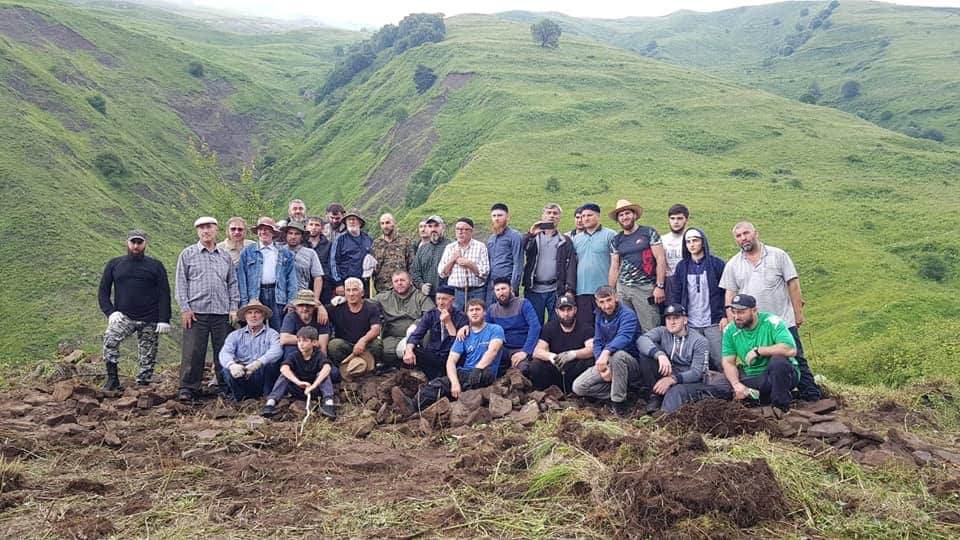
- Men of the teip Ghendargnoy

Total population
- 100,000

Regions with significant populations
- Russia: 93,000
- Chechnya: 85,000

Languages
- Chechen

Religion
- Suni Islam

Ghendargnoy (Chechen: Гендаргной) is a Chechen teip (clan). Its center is the village of Ghendargana. There is a hypothesis that it originated from the historic area in Chechen Republic called Nashkha.

== Etymology ==
The name Ghendargnoy comes from the name of an ancestor of this teip who lived about 900 years ago, whose name was Ghendar or Gundarghen.

== Geography ==
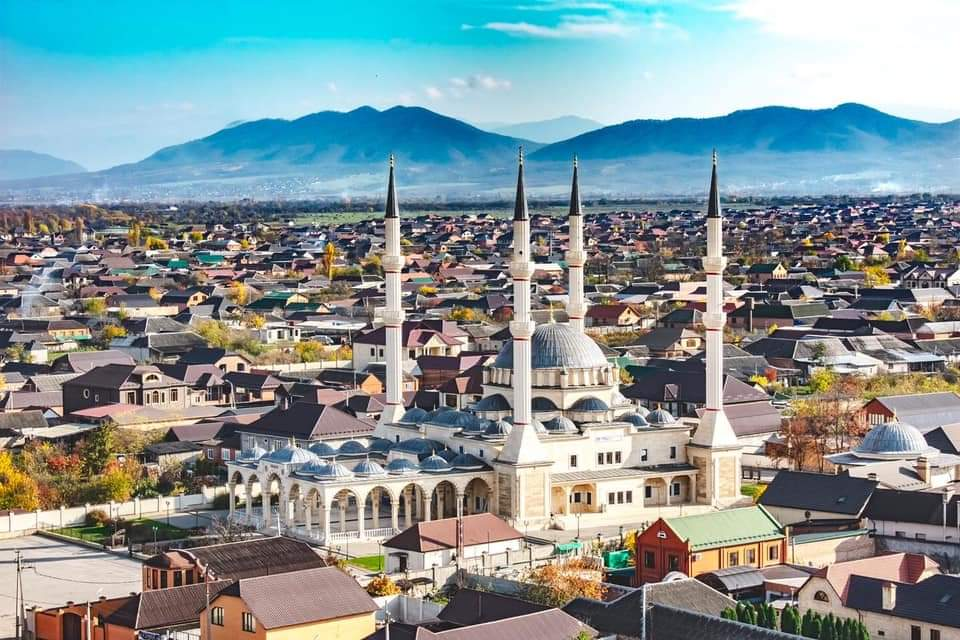
Ghendargnoy quarter in the south of Urus-Martan

Most members of the teip live near the northern slopes of the Black Caucasus Mountains.

== Branches ==
Branches of teip Ghendargnoy
Name	Famous people	Genetics
Aydamir		J2
Appaz	Isa of Ghendargan; Ramzan Akhmadov; Rizvan Akhmadov; Huta Akhmadov; Zelimkhan Akhmadov; Apti Akhmadov; Ali Guchigov; Maryam Chentieva	J2
Batal		J2
Bersi		J2
Buozi		J2
Eskar		J2
Keharsi		J2
Lorsi		Unknown
Lyazhgi		Unknown
Mammi	Khoza Mamayev; Kehursa Temirgireev; Eldar-Khadzhi; Khotu Mamayev	J2
Mugi	Chulik Gendargenoev	J2
Moagi	Apti Tokaev; Ayza Gazuyeva; Turpal Tokaev	J2
Mozgi		J2
Movsar	Vakhid Batalov; Andarbek Yandarov	J2
Muzhgi	Bilu Gaitaev; Musa Ovkhadov	J2
Mukhli		Unknown
Myulgi		J2
Nini	Buvadi Dakhiyev	J2
Nokkhoy	Eldar Aukhovsky	J2
Nokhi	Isa Khadzhimuradov	Unknown
Ovki		J2
Sai	Khasan Khakimov	Unknown
Sayki	Ismaylin Duda; Ibragim Chulikov; Yusup Elmurzaev	J2
Sedi	Bislan Sedaev	Unknown
Singal		J2
Solt		Unknown
Sokhti	Aslan Dukuzov	J2
Takalsh	Adam Beksultanov	J2
Tesi		Unknown
Tovzar		Unknown
Tuchi	Alu Alkhanov	J2
Yaskhab		Unknown
Yakhot		J2
