= Urus-Martanovsky =

Urus-Martanovsky (masculine), Urus-Martanovskaya (feminine), or Urus-Martanovskoye (neuter) may refer to:

- Urus-Martanovsky District, a district of the Chechen Republic, Russia
- Urus-Martanovskoye Urban Settlement, a municipal formation which Urus-Martan Town Administration in Urus-Martanovsky District of the Chechen Republic, Russia is incorporated as
