= Battle for Argun =

2000 battle of the Second Chechen war

- Part of the Second Chechen war
- Ramzan Akhmadov, Ibn al-Khattab, Abu al-Walid and Abu Jafar before the battle for Argun
Date	9–13 January 2000
Location	Argun, Chechen Republic
Result	Chechen victory

Belligerents
Russian Federation	Urus-Martanovsky Jamaat; Islamic International Brigade

Commanders and leaders
Gennady Troshev	Ramzan Akhmadov; Ibn al-Khattab; Abu al-Walid

Strength
15 T-72; 3 MI-24; 20 BMP-3; 1 SU-25	1500

Casualties and losses
Russian claim: 80	Unknown

The Battle for Argun (Russian: Битва за Аргун; Chechen: Оргера тӀом) took place between Chechen Islamists under the command of Ramzan Akhmadov and Ibn al-Khattab and the Armed Forces of the Russian Federation in the early stages of the Second Chechen war for control of the city of Argun. This military operation lasted four days and ended with significant losses for the Russian army.

== Background ==
After the Ichkerian Armed Forces under the command of Shamil Basayev were surrounded in Grozny in December 1999, Ibn al-Khattab suggested that Chechen Islamists attack the towns of Argun and Shali to distract the Russian army from Grozny. According to Khattab's plan. The Chechens were to operate in three large detachments: one would capture Shali, the second Argun, and the third would cut the Russian army's communications on the Gudermes-Grozny road and ambush several Russian rear columns at once.

According to plan, the amir of the Urus-Martanovsky Jamaat, Ramzan Akhmadov, was to be the main commander of the combat operation. It was he who was to capture the town of Argun. His squad included Islamists with good training and combat experience.

== Battle ==
On 6 January, in heavy snowfall, Ramzan Akhmadov's detachment descended to Shali and settled for the night in the territory of an abandoned huge industrial zone of a Pipe Factory. At that time the Russian command received information that a group of militants had been spotted on the territory of the plant. Three BMPs with Ulyanovsk and Yakutian OMON officers were sent to check this information. In the course of the battle two BMPs were burnt down, three fighters from the 74th Brigade were captured and 9 OMON officers and soldiers were killed. After the battle, artillery fired on the factory, but Ramzan Akhmadov's detachment had already left the site.

On 9 January, Ramzan Akhmadov's detachments entered the city of Argun from several sides and captured the city. At that time there were about 200 OMON (military police) soldiers in the surrounded buildings of the railway station and the commandant's office. Having learnt how many soldiers were in the commandant's base, Akhmadov subjected the building to heavy shelling and refused to storm it. Those who were surrounded urgently called for help. However, all attempts (counter attack) by Russian troops to make their way into Argun were repelled by the Islamic Brigade under the command of Ibn al-Khattab, who was operating on the outskirts of the city of Argun.

Having fulfilled their plan to divert the attention of Russian troops from the encircled city of Grozny, Ramzan Akhmadov's and Khattab's detachments retreated from Argun on 11 January, but minor fighting in the city continued for a couple of days. It is reported that during the retreat they organised the withdrawal of the wounded Shamil Basayev to the mountains. Ramzan Akhmadov later recalled that due to extreme fatigue they overturned the stretcher on which they were carrying Basayev several times.
