= Ibragim Chulikov =

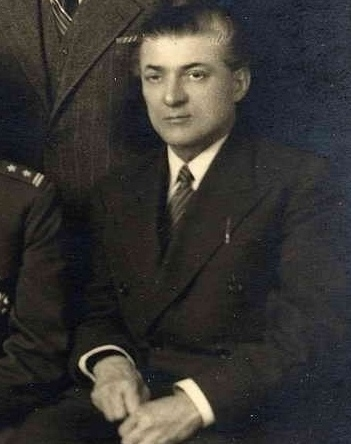
- Ibragim Chulikov in 1933

Chair of the Chechen National Council
- In office 1918–1920

Personal details
- Born: 22 March 1891 Urus-Martan, Chechnya
- Died: 1986 (aged 94–95) Seattle, Washington, U.S.

Military service
- Allegiance: Russian Imperial
- Years of service: Russia 1910–20; Italy 1944–45
- Rank: Colonel
- Battles/wars: World War I Russian Civil War; World War II

Ibragim Chulikov (Russian: Ибрагим Мяхтиевич Чуликов; 22 March 1891 – 1986) was a Chechen politician and military leader who inflicted a major defeat on the Communists in Chechnya during the Russian Civil War. In 1920 he emigrated to Europe, where he engaged in Anti-Soviet activities. During World War II, Chulikov fought against German forces on the side of Italian rebels.

== Family ==
Ibragim Chulikov was of the Gendargnoy teip and Sayki-Nek'e (Branch of a teip).

- Sayka
  - Ismayla
    - Duda (1802—1886)
    - Elzha
  - Chulik (1780—1829)
    - Suleyman Chulikov
      - Ullubiy Chulikov
        - Yusup Chulikov
          - Ali Chulikov (1900—1962)
            - Makhhmut Chulikov
      - Abdul-Kadyr Chulikov (Death. 1917)
        - Ali Chulikov
        - Alaudi Chulikov
        - Makhma Chulikov
          - Myakhti Chulikov
            - Ibragim Chulikov (1891—1986)
            - Makhmud Chulikov (Death. 1937)
              - Magomed Chulikov
          - Said-Magomed Chulikov
  - Noybri
  - Meza
