= Vakha Agaev =

Russian politician (1953–2020)

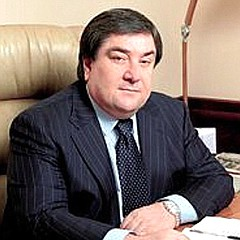

Member of the Duma
- In office 4 December 2011 – 23 September 2020
- Constituency: Krasnoyarsk Krai

Personal details
- Born: Vakha Abuevich Agaev; 15 March 1953 Kyzylorda, Kazakh SSR
- Died: 23 September 2020 (aged 67) Moscow, Russia
- Citizenship: Russian
- Party: Communist Party of the Russian Federation
- Occupation: Politician

Vakha Abuevich Agaev (15 March 1953 – 23 September 2020) was a Russian politician, who, since 2011, had been a Member of the State Duma, representing the Krasnoyarsk region. He was a member of the Communist Party of the Russian Federation. He also served as Deputy Chairman of the State Duma committee on property.

== Biography ==
Vaha Agayev was born on March 15, 1953, in the city of Kzyl-Orda, Kzyl-Orda region of the Kazakh SSR, in a large family deported from the Chechen-Ingush Autonomous Soviet Socialist Republic to the Kazakh SSR in 1944, during the Great Patriotic War (1941-1945). By nationality, he was Chechen.

In 1977, he graduated from the Historical Faculty of the Chechen-Ingush State University named after L.N. Tolstoy in Grozny.

Since 1981, he was a member of the Communist Party of the Soviet Union (CPSU).

In 1985, he graduated from the Economics Faculty of the Moscow Cooperative Institute of Centrosouz.

In 1998, he founded and headed the LLC "Yug-Neftprodukt," with its main assets being enterprises in the Krasnodar Krai.

From December 4, 2011, he served as a deputy in the State Duma of the Federal Assembly of the Russian Federation, VI convocation (elected as part of the federal list of candidates from the Communist Party of the Russian Federation, regional group from the Krasnoyarsk Krai), a member of the Communist Party of the Russian Federation faction, deputy chairman of the State Duma committee on property issues.

In March 2013, he was awarded the title of "Honorary Citizen of the Chechen Republic" for his personal contribution to the socio-economic development of the region.

In 2016, he was elected as a deputy in the State Duma of the Federal Assembly of the Russian Federation, VII convocation (as part of the all-Russian part of the federal list from the Communist Party of the Russian Federation).

Vaha Abuovich Agayev died on September 23, 2020, in Moscow, at the age of sixty-seven, from coronavirus infection. He was buried on September 25, 2020, in the cemetery in his ancestral village of Roshni-Chu in the Urus-Martanovsky district of the Chechen Republic of the Russian Federation, where his parents are also buried.

In 2020, the V. A. Agayev Charitable Foundation was established.

In 2021, in the village of Samashki, the Lenin Street was renamed to "Vaha Agayev Street" upon the request of local residents.

=== Family ===
Vaha Agayev was married. His son, Bekkhan Vahaevich Agayev (born March 29, 1975, Grozny), served as a deputy in the State Duma of the Federal Assembly of the Russian Federation, VI and VIII convocations, representing the political party "United Russia".

== See also ==
- List of members of the State Duma of Russia who died in office
