= Aslan Dukuzov =

Chechen Salafist leader

- Born: 1973; Urus-Martan, Checheno-Ingush ASSR, Soviet Union
- Died: 15 April 2002 (aged 28–29); Tangi-Chu, Chechnya
- Military career
- Allegiance: Chechen Republic of Ichkeria
- Branch: Chechen National Guard
- Rank: Amir
- Nickname: Saif Islam
- Commands: Urus-Martanovsky Jamaat
- Conflicts: First Chechen War; Second Chechen War

Aslan Dukuzov (Russian: Аслан Дукузов; 1973 — 15 April 2002) was a militant leader in the Urus-Martanovsky District and deputy to Ramzan Akhmadov, who took part in the First and Second Chechen Wars. Aslan was of the Ghendargnoy teip and Sokhti-Nek'e (Branch of a teip).

== Biography ==
Aslan Dukuzov was born in the town of Urus-Martan. He was a close friend of Ramzan Akhmadov and participated with him in the fighting against the Russian army during the First Chechen war.

During the Second Chechen war, Dukuzov was one of the most influential commanders of the Chechen armed forces and had 40 rebel groups under his command.

Dukuzov was involved in numerous explosions of military armored vehicles and shootings of servicemen. He has been called the most daring and brutal raider against Russian troops. Dukuzov also killed Chechens who cooperated with the Russian authorities. He is said to have instilled fear in the entire Urus-Martanovsky District.

On 15 April 2002, a special forces unit moved to intercept Dukuzov's group returning from a mountain base, which had been spotted by military intelligence near the village of Tangi-Chu. The special forces attempted to surround the militants on the western outskirts of the village, between the school and the cemetery. When the militants noticed shadows on the school walls, they opened fire. Two special forces and two militants, including Dukuzov himself, were killed in the firefight.
