= Ramzan Akhmadov =

Chechen army general (1970–2001)

- Ӏадлани-воӀ Рамзан

1st Emir of the Islamic brigade
- In office 1999–2001
- Preceded by: Position established
- Succeeded by: Rizvan Akhmadov

1st Emir of the Urus-Martan Jamaat
- In office 1994–2001
- Preceded by: Position established
- Succeeded by: Aslan Dukuzov

Personal details
- Born: 3 February 1970 Urus-Martan, Checheno-Ingush ASSR, Soviet Union
- Died: 9 February 2001 (aged 31) Starye Atagi, Chechen Republic of Ichkeria
- Awards: Honor of the Nation (Ichkeria)
- Website: ahmadov.org
- Nickname: Khamza

Military service
- Allegiance: Confederation of Mountain Peoples of the Caucasus; Chechen Republic of Ichkeria
- Years of service: 1992–2001
- Rank: Brigadier General
- Commands: Southwestern Front; Islamic brigade Urus-Martan Jamaat
- Battles/wars: War in Abkhazia; Battle of Gagra; First Chechen War; Battle of Grozny; Attack on Buinaksk; War of Dagestan; Capture of Novolaksky; Second Chechen War; Battle of Duba-Yurt; Battle for Argun; Battle of Shatoy

Ramzan Adlanovich Akhmadov (Chechen: Ӏадлани-воӀ Рамзан; Russian: Рамзан Адланович Ахмадов; 3 February 1970 – 9 February 2001) was a Chechen Salafi leader and a brigadier general in the Chechen Armed Forces who commanded the Southwestern Front during the Second Chechen War. He was also the founder of the Islamist organisations Islamic brigade and Urus-Martan Jamaat, which sought to establish Sharia law throughout Chechnya. Ramzan was of the Ghendargnoy teip and Appaz-Nek'e (Branch of a teip).

== Biography ==
Ramzan Akhmadov was born on 3 February 1970 in Urus-Martan, in south-western Chechnya. He was the seventh of nine Akhmadov brothers from the Ghendargnoy teip.

In the Georgian-Abkhazian war of 1992-1993 Akhmadov fought against Georgia as a volunteer under the command of Shamil Basayev. After returning to Chechnya, he formed the Urus-Martanovsky Jamaat, an Islamist organisation, which took over the Urus-Martanovsky District a few years later, ousting the mayor of Urus-Martan and the district qadi.

At the beginning of the First Chechen war, Ramzan took part in the fighting in Grozny, the capital of the Chechen Republic of Ichkeria. Despite his young age, he had the qualities of a leader and knowledge of military affairs. It is said that he did not take into his unit those who consumed alcohol and tobacco products forbidden by Islam.

Ramzan Akhmadov was a participant in many battles. Before every military operation, he conducted a thorough reconnaissance to keep his fighters safe. He always went into battle ahead of everyone else and was wounded many times. It is reported that after Ramzan organised an attack on a Russian army checkpoint and completely destroyed it, President Dzhokhar Dudayev invited him and presented him with his pistol and awards.

At the beginning of the Second Chechen war, Ramzan Akhmadov was appointed by Aslan Maskhadov as commander of the South-Western Front and was awarded the rank of brigadier general. He participated in major battles in Argun and Shatoy before being killed by Russian special forces in February 2001.
