= Hakkoy Peak =

Mountain peak in Chechnya

- Хьаккойн-Лам (chechen language)

Geography
- Country: Russia
- Parent range: Caucasus

The Hakkoy Peak., also called Hakkoy Lam, is a peak in the Argun gorge, near the village of Shatoy in Chechenya, Russia. Along the Hakkoy Peak ridge near the village of Zony, there were battle and watch towers which were completely destroyed at the beginning of the 20th century. Peak of Chechen warrior clan Hakkoy.
