= Buvadi Dakhiyev =

Chechen lieutenant colonel (1968–2006)

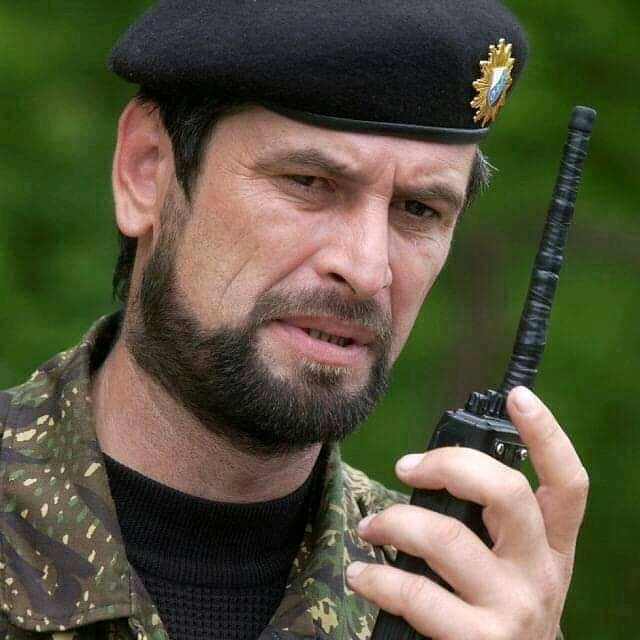
- Born: April 28, 1968; Urus-Martan, Checheno-Ingush Autonomous Soviet Socialist Republic, USSR
- Died: September 13, 2006 (aged 38); Vladikavkaz, North Ossetia–Alania, Russia
- Military career
- Allegiance: Russia
- Branch: OMON
- Rank: Podpolkovnik
- Commands: OMON
- Conflicts: First Chechen War; Second Chechen War

Buvadi Sultanovich Dakhiyev (Russian: Бувади Султанович Дахиев; 28 April 1968 – 13 September 2006) was a Chechen soldier; the commander of the Chechen OMON and active participants of the First and Second Wars in Chechnya.

== Biography ==
He is a teacher of history and social studies by education. During the First Chechen War he was a company commander of the Chechen OMON fighting on the side of Russia. After the withdrawal of Russian troops from Chechnya, he was persecuted by the Akhmadov brothers, as a result of which he lived in Moscow and Latvia. During the Second Chechen War he was a commander of the Chechen OMON.

=== Death ===
A clash occurred between a group of Chechen policemen travelling to Ingushetia to apprehend a criminal and local policemen, resulting in seven dead and 20 wounded on both sides. Dakhiyev, who learnt of this, went to the scene of the conflict to settle it, where he was seriously wounded. Dakhiev died of his wounds the same day in a hospital in Vladikavkaz.
