= Administrative divisions of Chechnya =

Districts, cities/towns, urban-type settlements, rural administrations, rural localities
- Location: Chechnya
- Number: 15 districts 6 cities/towns 4 urban-type settlements 217 rural administrations 360 rural localities
- Populations: (Districts and cities only): 3,094 (Sharoysky District) – 297,137 (Grozny)
- Areas: (Districts and cities only): 11 sq mi (28 km^{2}) (Argun) – 1,200 sq mi (3,000 km^{2}) (Shelkovskoy District)
- Government: District and city authorities, National government

This article lists the administrative divisions of Chechnya, Russia.

- Cities of republican significance:
  - Grozny (Грозный) (capital)
  - Argun (Аргун)
  - Gudermes (Гудермес)
- Towns of district significance:
  - Shali (Шали)
  - Urus-Martan (Урус-Мартан)
  - Kurchaloy (Курчалой)
- Districts:
  - Achkhoy-Martanovsky (Ачхой-Мартановский)
  - Groznensky (Грозненский)
  - Gudermessky (Гудермесский)
  - Itum-Kalinsky (Итум-Калинский)
  - Kurchaloyevsky (Курчалоевский)
  - Nadterechny (Надтеречный)
  - Naursky (Наурский)
  - Nozhay-Yurtovsky (Ножай-Юртовский)
  - Sernovodsky (Серноводский)
  - Shalinsky (Шалинский)
  - Sharoysky (Шаройский)
  - Shatoysky (Шатойский)
  - Shelkovskoy (Шелковской)
  - Urus-Martanovsky (Урус-Мартановский)
  - Vedensky (Веденский)

Cheberloyevsky and Galanchozhsky Districts were re-introduced into the Constitution of the Chechen Republic in November 2012 (after having been removed in December 2007); however, as of 2020, their borders and composition have not been officially defined.
