= Akhmetov =

Akhmetov or Ahmetov is a Turkic surname that is common along the Islamic post-Soviet regions of Bashkortostan, Kazakhstan and Tatarstan, with the addition of Chuvashia. The name originates from Arabic as Ahmad (Arabic: أحمد), meaning as the "most praiseworthy". The surname in feminine is often written as Akhmetova.

Notable people with the surname include:

- Adelina Akhmetova (born 1988), Kazakh athlete
- Dajan Ahmet (né Ahmetov; 1962–2006), Estonian actor
- Daniyal Akhmetov (born 1954), 6th Prime Minister of Kazakhstan
- Diana Akhmetova (born 1994), Russian weightlifter
- Kairat Akhmetov (born 1987), Kazakh mixed martial artist
- Ilzat Akhmetov (born 1997), Russian footballer
- Laila Akhmetova (born 1954), Kazakh historian, professor and writer
- Rinat Akhmetov (born 1966), Ukrainian billionaire and businessman
- Rustam Akhmetov (born 1950), Soviet high jumper
- Serik Akhmetov (born 1958), 8th Prime Minister of Kazakhstan
- Tatyana Akhmetova-Amanzhol (born 1985), Kazakh freestyle wrestler

== See also ==
- Ahmadov
- Akhmedov
