= Kehursa Temirgireev =

Chechen politician (1869–1925)

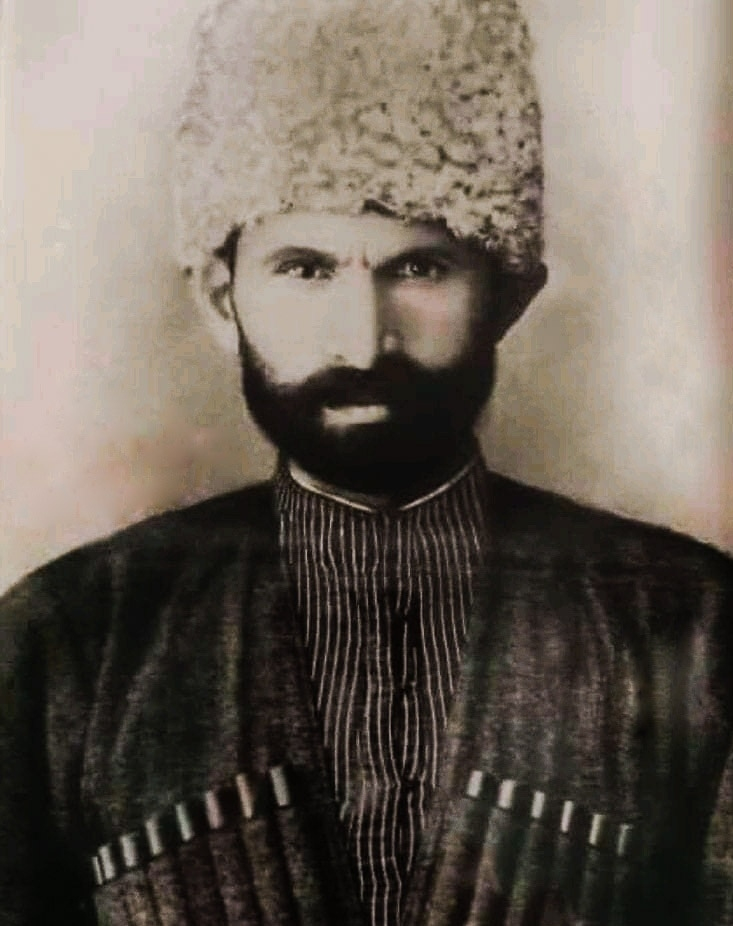

Head of Khasavyurtovsky okrug
- In office 1919–1920

Personal details
- Born: 1869 Gendargen, Chechnya
- Died: 1925 (aged 55–56) Mayrtup, Chechnya

Military service
- Allegiance: North Caucasian Emirate
- Years of service: 1917–1925
- Battles/wars: Russian Civil War

Kehursa Temirgireev (Chechen: Temirgerrin Kohursa; 1869–1925) was a North Caucasian politician and military commander who was chief of the Khasavyurtovsky okrug. He also led the liberation of Chechen villages from Denikin's detachments and Bolshevik gangs. He was killed in an ambush in 1925. Kehursa was of the Ghendargnoy teip.

== Biography ==
Kehursa was born in 1869 in Gendargen. His great-grandfather named Mamma was a participant in the Caucasus War, who in 1839 together with Imam Shamil repelled the Siege of Akhoulgo.

In 1919–1920 Kehursa was chief of the Khasavyurtovsky okrug in the North Caucasian Emirate. While there, he led the liberation of Chechen villages in the Khasavyurtovsky okrug from Denikin and Bolshevik detachments.

Kehursa died in 1925 after being ambushed by Bolsheviks near the village of Mayrtup.

=== Family ===
Kehursa was of the Ghendargnoy teip and Mammi-Nek'e (branch of a teip).

- Mamma (1780–1850)
  - Iles
  - Mati
  - Chuli
    - Vagap
    - Betish
      - Azim
  - Khotu (1818–1893)
    - Umarpasha
    - Pasha
      - Gezmakhma
      - Makhmagez
  - Geti
    - Mazhig
    - Mukhmat
    - Musa
      - Beshir
      - Saidali
    - Gaka
      - Altay
    - Mokhmad
      - Mukhmad
      - Arzu
    - Betiray
    - Temirgeri
      - Zaka
      - Kehursa (1869–1925)
    - Eda
      - Saydulla
      - Syaa
  - Khoza (1820–1855)
    - Ibrekhim
      - Ela
      - Isa
    - Ilyas
      - Pasurka
