= Bilu Gaitaev =

Chechen military leader

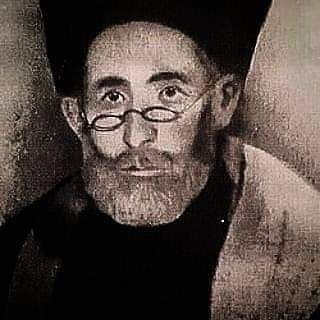

Qadi of Urus-Martanovsky District
- In office 1910–1925

Personal details
- Born: 1852 Martan-Chu, Chechnya
- Died: 1925 (aged 72–73) Rostov Oblast, Soviet Union

Military service
- Allegiance: Caucasian Imamate
- Years of service: 1870–78 (Soviet Union) 1918—25
- Battles/wars: Russian Civil War; Hundred Days Battle; Denikin's operation in Chechnya; Battle of Goyty; Battle of Alkhan-Yurt; North Caucasus Operation

Bilu Gaitaev (Chechen: Goyti Bilu; 1852 — 1925) was a Chechen military leader and religious figure who took part in the Russian Civil War. Under Gaitaev's leadership, Chechens took part in major battles against the White Army. Bilu was of the Gendargnoy teip and Muzhgi-Nek'e (branch of a teip).

== Biography ==
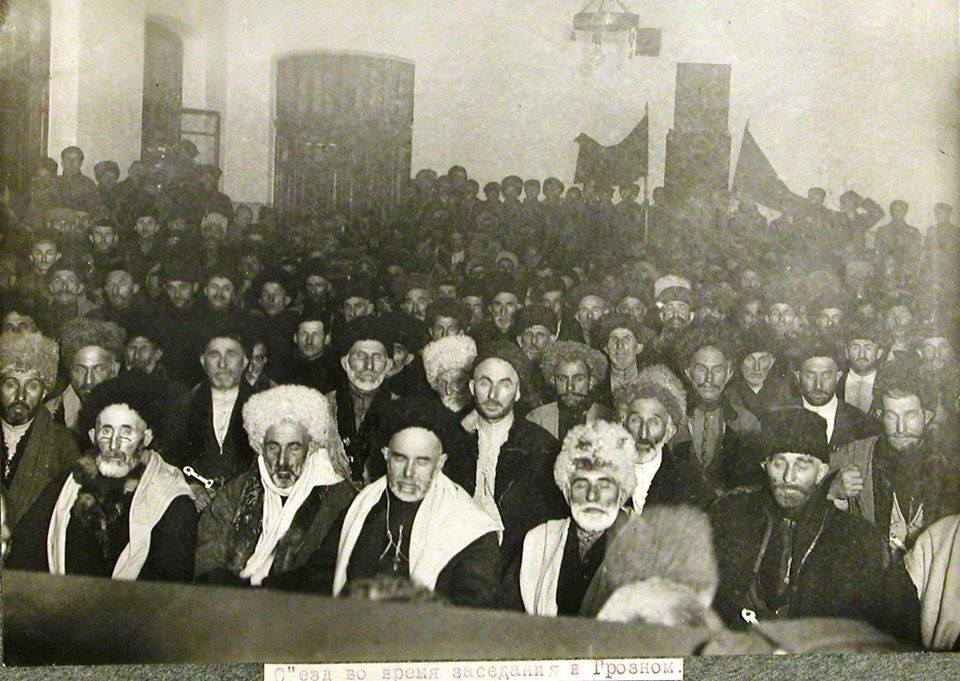
Gaitayev at the 1923 Chechen Congress, which proclaimed the Chechen Autonomous Oblast

Gaitayev fought against the Russian Empire for many years, so during the Russian Revolution he supported the Soviet authorities, believing that they would let Chechens live by their own rules and Sharia law. However, after the war Gaitaev was declared an enemy of the Soviet state and sentenced to death, which was carried out in 1925 in the Rostov Oblast.
