= Ali Guchigov =

Soviet military and statesman

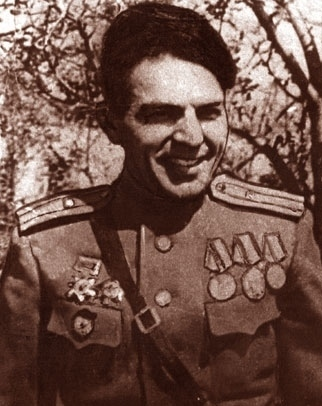

Deputy of the USSR Supreme Soviet from Checheno-Ingush ASSR
- In office 1937–1944

Personal details
- Born: 1914 Urus-Martan, Terek Oblast, Russian Imperial
- Died: 29 September 1957 (aged 42–43) Urus-Martan, Checheno-Ingush ASSR, Soviet Union
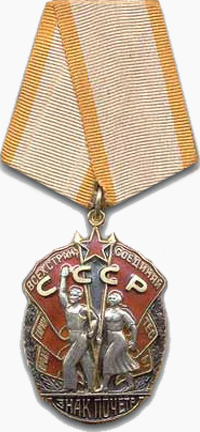
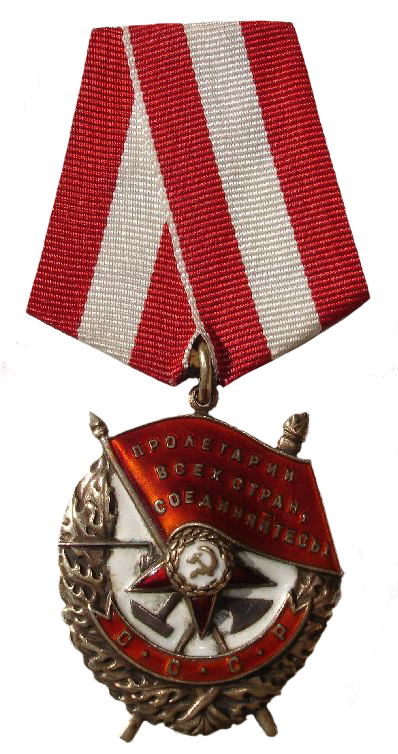
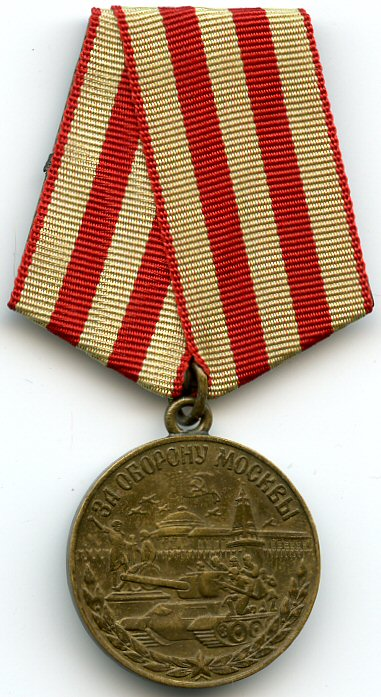
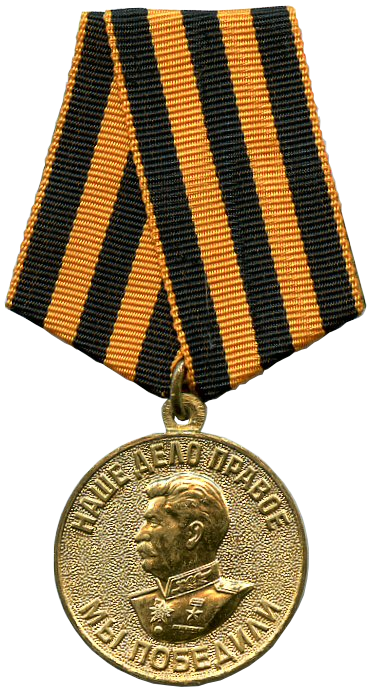
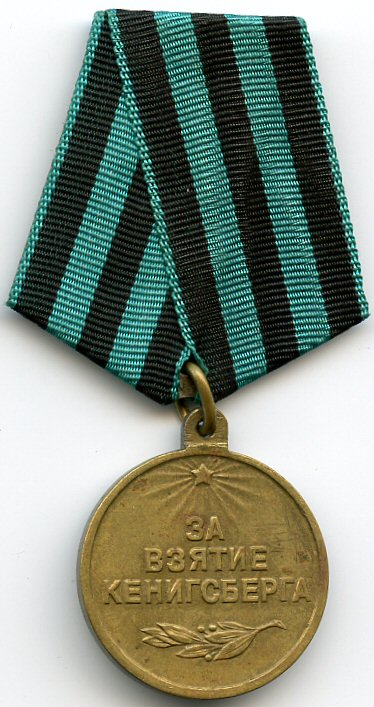
- Awards

Military service
- Years of service: (Soviet Union) 1939—57
- Rank: Major
- Battles/wars: Winter War; World War II

Ali Ayubovich Guchigov (Russian: Али Аюбович Гучигов; 1914 – 29 September 1957) was a Soviet military and statesman of Chechen origin, a deputy of the USSR Supreme Soviet from the Chechen-Ingush ASSR, who took part in World War II. He was twice presented to the title of Hero of the Soviet Union
