= Itum-Kalinsky District =

Itum-Kalinsky District Итум-Калинский район (Russian)
- District

Other transcription(s)
  - Chechen: Итон-Кхаьллан кӏошт
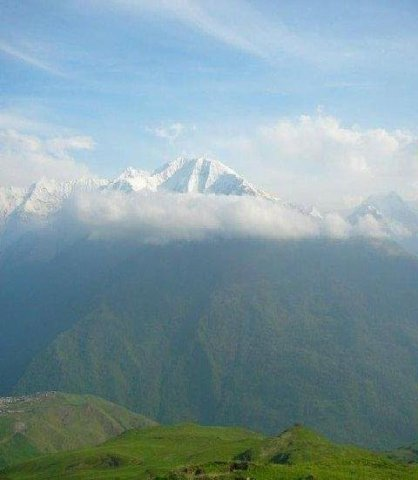
- Mount Tebulosmta, the highest peak of the Eastern Caucasus Mountains, is located in Itum-Kalinsky District on the border with Georgia

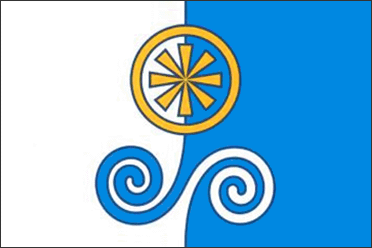
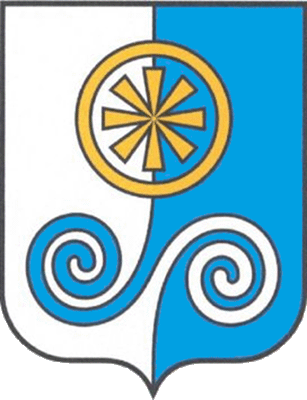
- Flag Coat of arms
- Location of Itum-Kalinsky District in the Chechen Republic
- Coordinates: 42°44′06″N 45°34′37″E
- Country: Russia
- Federal subject: Chechen Republic
- Established: 1923
- Administrative center: Itum-Kale

Area
  - Total: 1,277 km^{2} (493 sq mi)

Population (2010 Census)
  - Total: 5,483
  - Density: 4.294/km^{2} (11.12/sq mi)
  - Urban: 0%
  - Rural: 100%

Administrative structure
  - Administrative divisions: 13 rural administration
  - Inhabited localities: 31 rural localities

Municipal structure
  - Municipally incorporated as: Itum-Kalinsky Municipal District
  - Municipal divisions: 0 urban settlements, 13 rural settlements
- Time zone: UTC+3 (MSK)
- OKTMO ID: 96611000
- Website: http://www.itumkali.com/

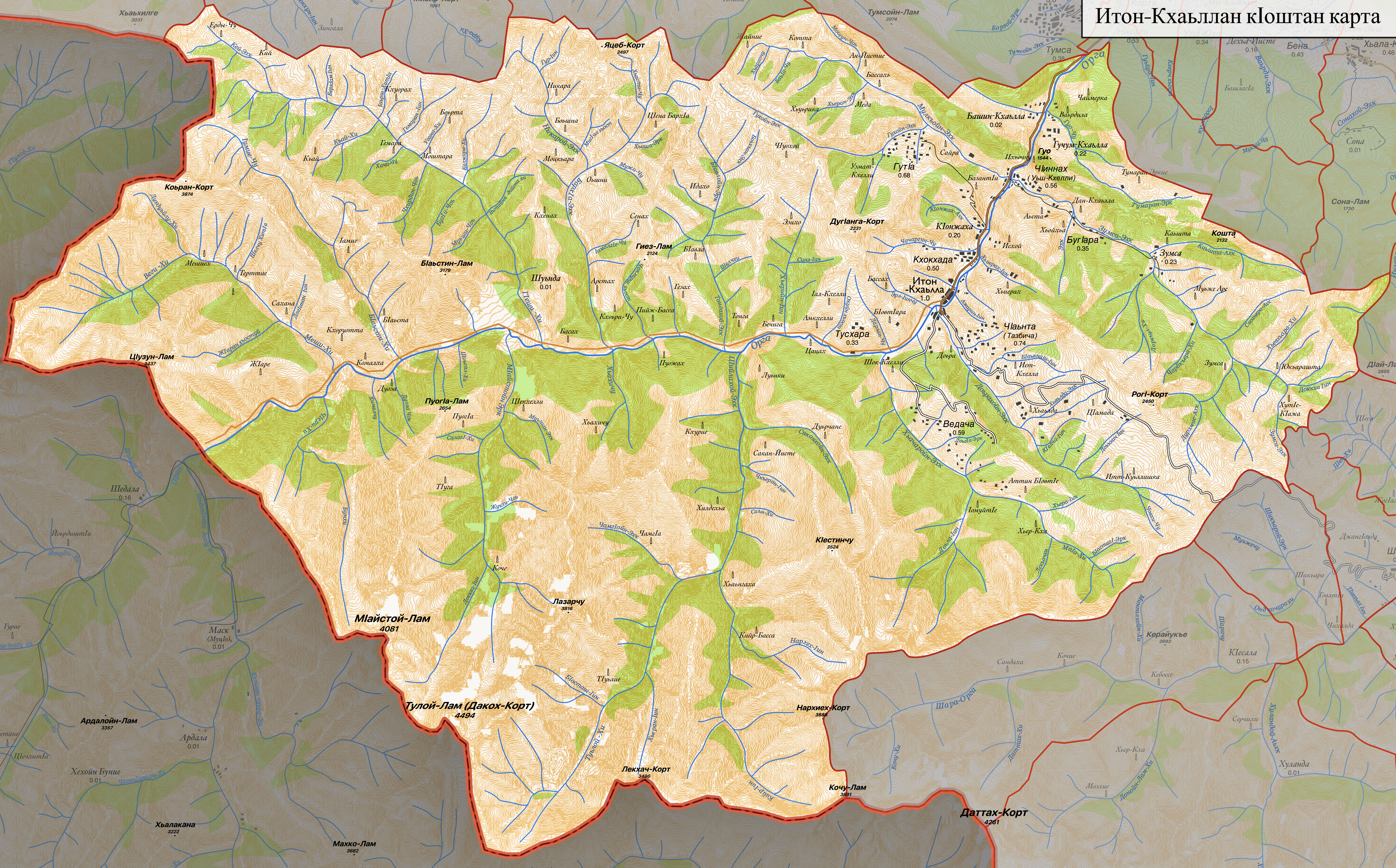
Map of Itum-Kalinsky district (in Chechen)

Itum-Kalinsky District (Russian: Итум-Калинский райо́н; Chechen: Итон-Кхаьллан кӏошт, Iton-Qällan khoşt) is an administrative and municipal district (raion), one of the fifteen in the Chechen Republic, Russia. It is located in the south of the republic. The area of the district is 1,277 square kilometers (493 sq mi). Its administrative center is the rural locality (a selo) of Itum-Kale (Itum-Kali). Population: 5,483 (2010 census); 6,083 (2002 Census). The population of Itum-Kale accounts for 19.5% of the district's total population. The village of Ushcaloy is also in the district.
