= Bekkhan Agayev =

Russian politician (born 1975)

- Бекхан Агаев
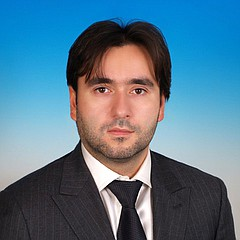

Deputy of the 8th State Duma
- Incumbent
- Assumed office 19 September 2021

Deputy of the 6th State Duma of the Russian Federation
- In office 15 December 2011 – 2016

Personal details
- Born: Agayev Bekhan Vakhaevich; 29 March 1975 (age 51) Grozny, Checheno-Ingush Autonomous Soviet Socialist Republic, Checheno-Ingush Autonomous Soviet Socialist Republic, USSR
- Party: United Russia
- Parent: Vakha Agaev (father)
- Education: All-Russian Academy of Foreign Trade

Bekhan Vakhaevich Agayev (Russian: Бекха́н Ваха́евич Ага́ев; born 29 March 1975, Grozny, Checheno-Ingush Autonomous Soviet Socialist Republic) is a Russian political figure, deputy of the 6th and 8th State Dumas convocations. He is the son of the politician and entrepreneur Vakha Agaev who in 2004 founded the company Yug-nefteprodukt, that primarily focuses on the wholesale distribution of petroleum and petroleum products and previously played an important role in the export of oil from Chechnya.

In 2000 Bekhan Agayev was awarded a Candidate of Sciences degree from the Kabardino-Balkarian State Agrarian University named after V. M. Kokov. In December 2011, he was elected to the State Duma of the 6th convocation, running from the United Russia. Since 19 September 2021 he has served as a deputy of the 8th State Duma.

== Biography ==
He was born on March 29, 1975, in Grozny, Chechen-Ingush Autonomous Soviet Socialist Republic. He is of Chechen nationality.

His father, Vakha Agayev, served as a deputy in the State Duma of the sixth convocation representing the Communist Party of the Russian Federation (CPRF).

He is the father of four children.

He is the founder of annual grants for students of the M.S. Gusev Udmurt State University Oil and Gas Institute. These grants have been awarded since at least 2012.

Entrepreneurial activity

Since 2003, he has served as Vice President of Yug-Nefteprodukt LLC.

After 2016, he continued his business activities, chairing the Supervisory Board of Yug-Nefteprodukt LLC until 2021, while also being a co-owner of the company.

== Sanctions ==
He was sanctioned by the UK government in 2022 in relation to the Russo-Ukrainian War.

He is one of the members of the State Duma the United States Treasury sanctioned on 24 March 2022 in response to the 2022 Russian invasion of Ukraine.

== Property ==
In 2021, Agaev’s officially declared income amounted to nearly half a billion rubles — RUB 451,660,617.

As of 2021, he owned the following properties: land plots of 212 m² and 7,028 m²; a 2,205.9 m² residential house; and non-residential premises measuring 75.8 m², 78.7 m², 79 m², 86.7 m², 98.2 m², 100.1 m², and 891.8 m².

He also held fractional ownership interests in a number of properties and infrastructure facilities, including buildings, roads, outdoor lighting, sewerage, gas, stormwater drainage, electricity, and water supply networks. According to his declaration, two of his children had the right to use a 153.4 m² apartment free of charge.

According to the Dubai Unlocked investigation by the Organized Crime and Corruption Reporting Project (OCCRP), Agaev owned a 352 m² apartment at Kempinski Palm Residences in Dubai, valued at approximately USD 9.4 million. The property was initially registered in Agaev’s name but was later transferred to Malika Sadulaeva, the mother of his children. As of 2024, the apartment was reportedly being rented out for nearly USD 100,000 per year.
