= Ismaylin Duda =

Chechen warlord (1802–1886)

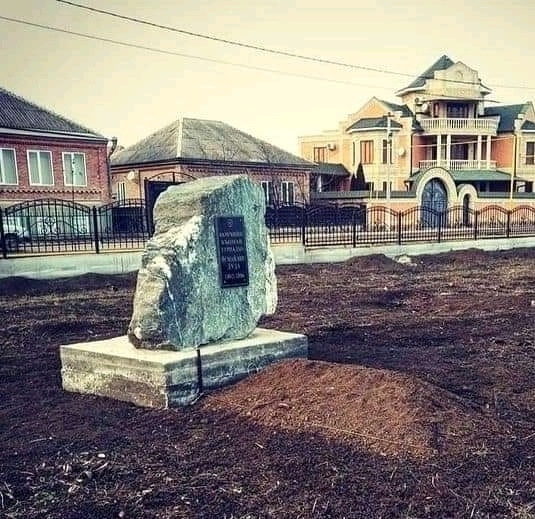
- The tomb of Duda in Urus-Martan
- Born: 1802; Urus-Martan, Chechnya
- Died: 1886 (aged 83–84); Urus-Martan, Chechnya
- Military career
- Allegiance: Chechnya
- Commands: Urus-Martan detachment
- Conflicts: Caucasian War; Battle in Urus-Martan (1826); Battle in Urus-Martan (1830); Battle in Urus-Martan (1831); Battle of the Valerik River (1840)

Ismaylin Duda (Chechen: Исмайлин Дуда; 1802–1886) was a Chechen warlord, commander of the Urus-Martan detachment that fought in the Caucasus War. In 1820-1840, Duda, together with Beibulat and Isa, repelled Russian attacks in south-western Chechnya, inflicting major defeats on the Russian army. Duda was of the Gendargenoy teip and Sayki-Nek'e (Branch of a teip).
