= Ushcaloy =

Rural locality in Chechnya, Russia

Ushcaloy Ушкалой Chechen: Чӏиннах, Уьш-Кхелли
- Village
- Interactive map of Ushcaloy
- Location of Ushcaloy Ushcaloy (Chechnya)
- Coordinates: 42.781115°N 45.608557°E
- Country: Russia
- Federal subject: Chechnya
- Administrative district: Itum-Kalinsky district

Government
  - Leader: Azimov Abu Said
- Elevation: 732 m (2,402 ft)

Population
  - Estimate (2020): 535 )
- Time zone: UTC+3 (MSK)
- Postal code: 366403
- OKTMO ID: 96611428101

Ushcaloy (Chechen: Чӏиннах, Уьш-Кхелли, Ç̇innax, Üş-Qelli) is a village in the Itum-Kalinsky District of the Chechen Republic. It is the administrative center of the Ushkaloiskiy rural settlement.

== Geography ==
Ushkaloyskoye rural settlement within the Itum-Kalinsky District.

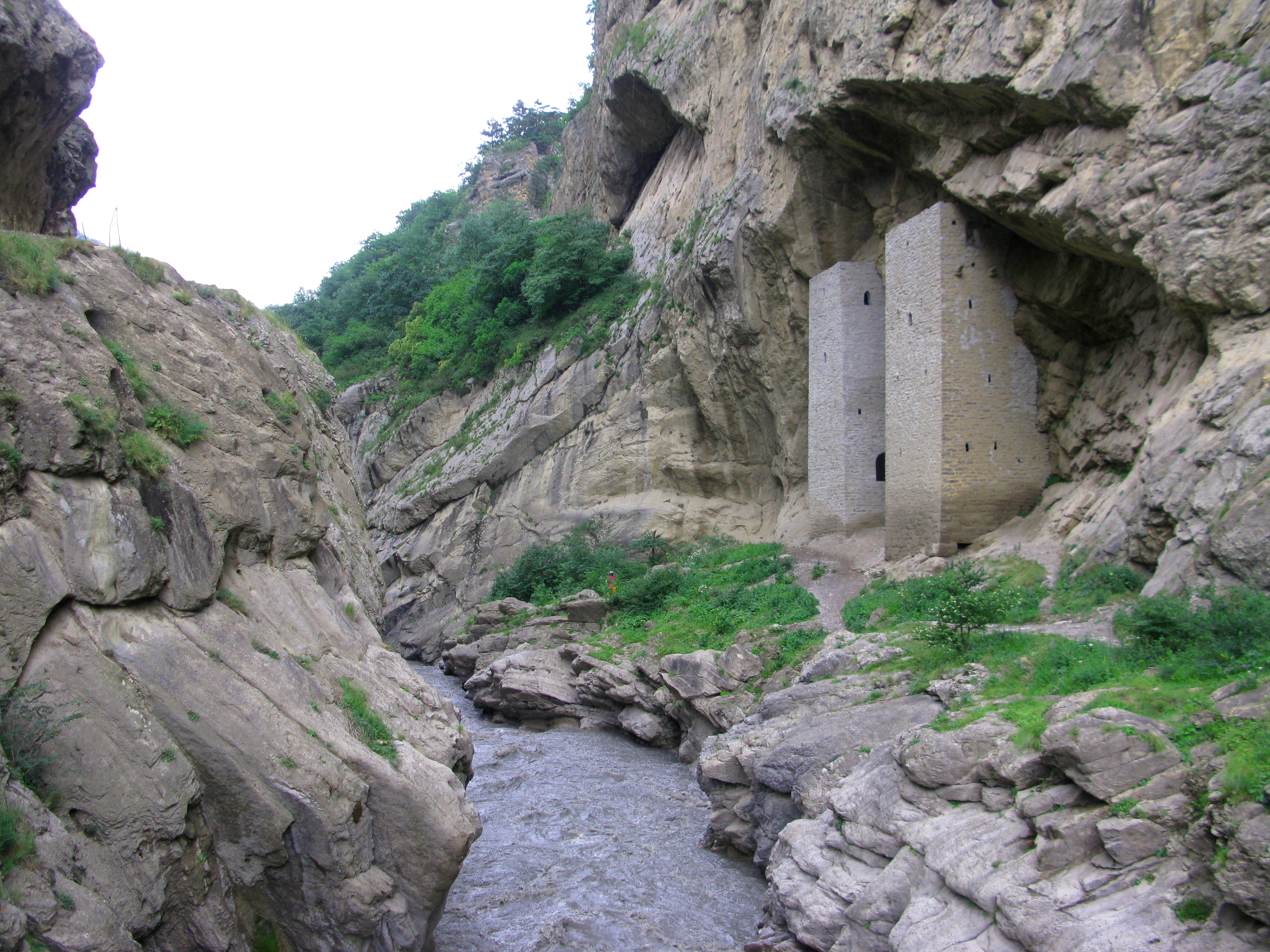
Towers in Ushcaloy, Chechnya

The village is located on both banks of the Argun River, at the confluence of the left tributary Dzumserk (Дзумсэрк), 5 km north-east of the regional center Itum-Kali.

The nearest settlements are: in the north, the village of Guchum-Kale (Гучум-Кале); in the southeast, the village of Bugaroy (Бугарой); in the southwest, the village of Konzhukhoi (Конжухой); and in the northwest, the village of Gukhoi (Гухой).

== History ==
Ushcaloy is the ancestral village of teip Chinkhoy.

== Population ==
The population of Ushcaloy was 304 in 1990, and rose to 535 in 2020.

== Infrastructure ==
Ushcaloy is home to a rural mosque and Ushkaloiskaya municipal secondary school.
