= Shatoysky District =

Shatoysky District Шатойский район (Russian)
- District

Other transcription(s)
  - Chechen: Шуьйтан кӏошта
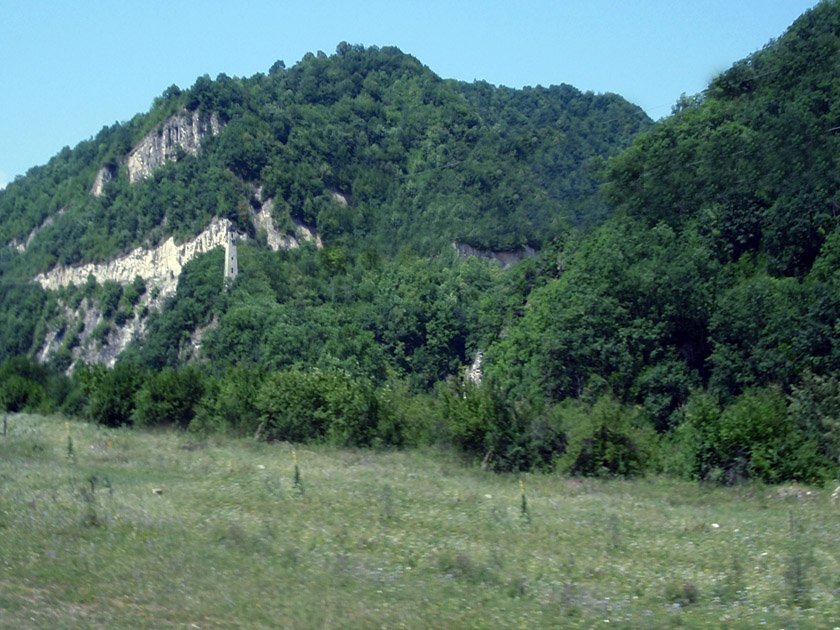
- Hills in Shatoysky District

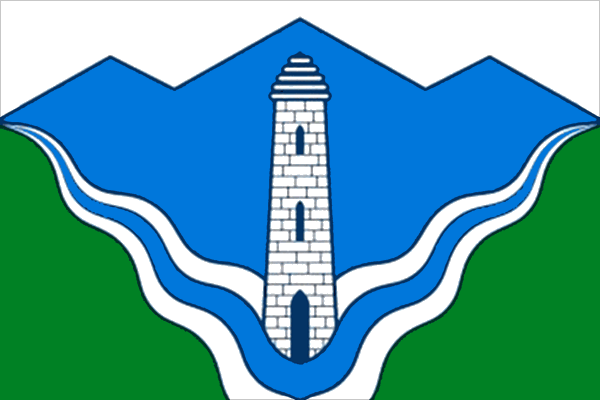
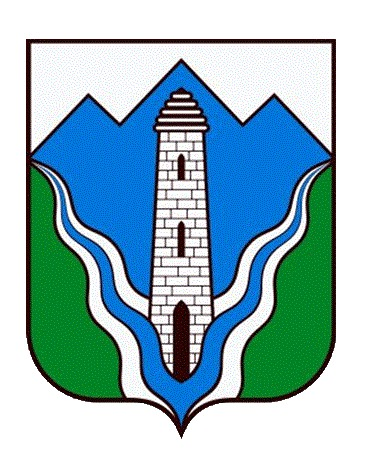
- Flag Coat of arms
- Location of Shatoysky District in the Chechen Republic
- Coordinates: 42°52′18″N 45°41′57″E
- Country: Russia
- Federal subject: Chechen Republic
- Established: 1920
- Administrative center: Shatoy

Area
  - Total: 505 km^{2} (195 sq mi)

Population (2010 Census)
  - Total: 16,812
  - Density: 33.3/km^{2} (86.2/sq mi)
  - Urban: 0%
  - Rural: 100%

Administrative structure
  - Administrative divisions: 15 rural administration
  - Inhabited localities: 32 rural localities

Municipal structure
  - Municipally incorporated as: Shatoysky Municipal District
  - Municipal divisions: 0 urban settlements, 15 rural settlements
- Time zone: UTC+3 (MSK)
- OKTMO ID: 96628000
- Website: http://sharoy.info/

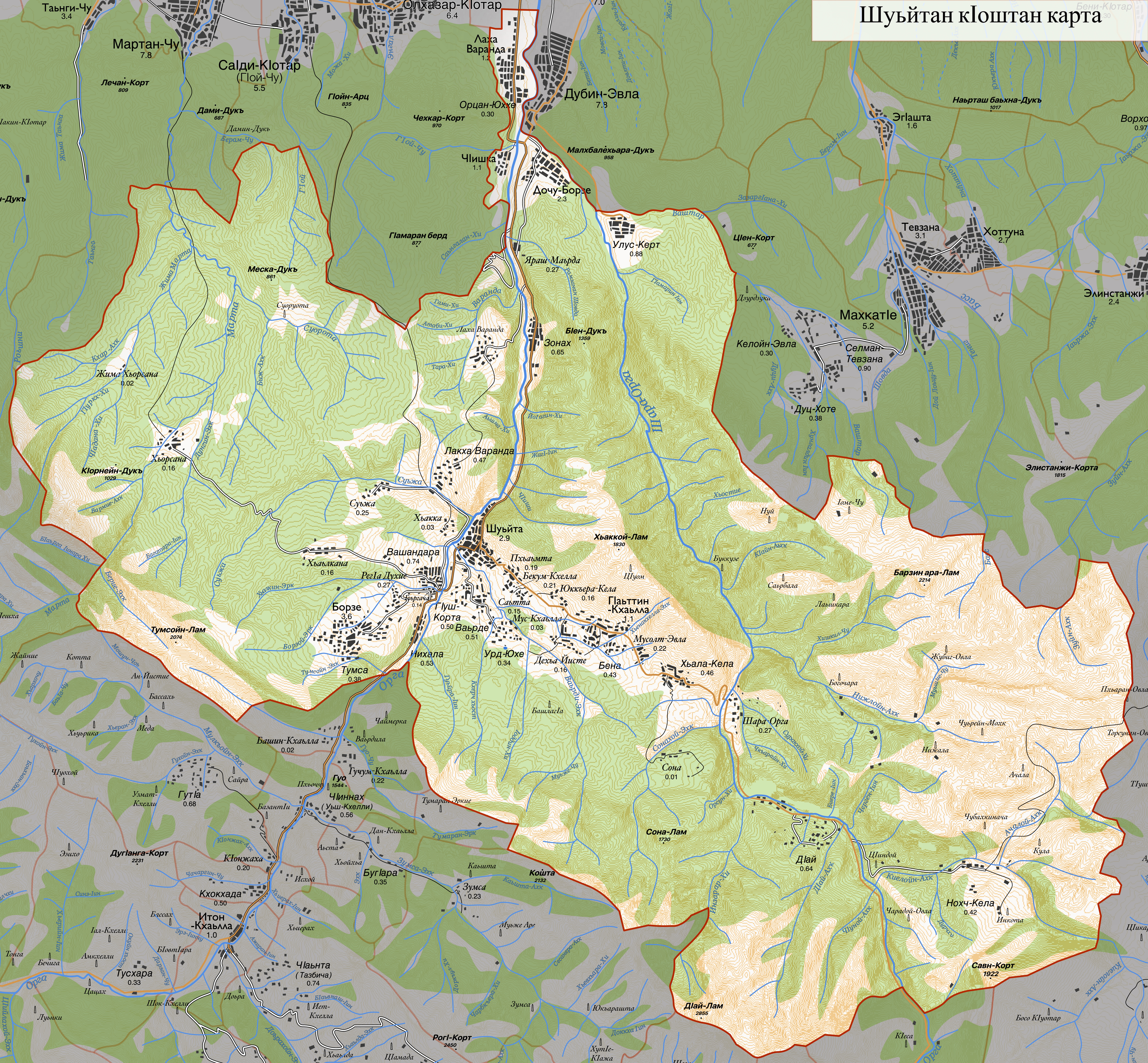
Map of the Shatoi District (in Chechen)

Shatoysky District (Russian: Шато́йский райо́н; Chechen: Шуьйтан кӏошта, Şüytan khoşta) is an administrative and municipal district (raion), one of the fifteen in the Chechen Republic, Russia. It is located in the south of the republic. The area of the district is 505 square kilometers (195 sq mi). Its administrative center is the rural locality (a selo) of Shatoy. Population: 16,812 (2010 census); 13,155 (2002 Census). The population of Shatoy accounts for 17.6% of the district's total population.
