= Khanlar Ahmedov =

Azerbaijani painter-sculptor (born 1946)

Khanlar Ahmedov Xanlar Əhmədov
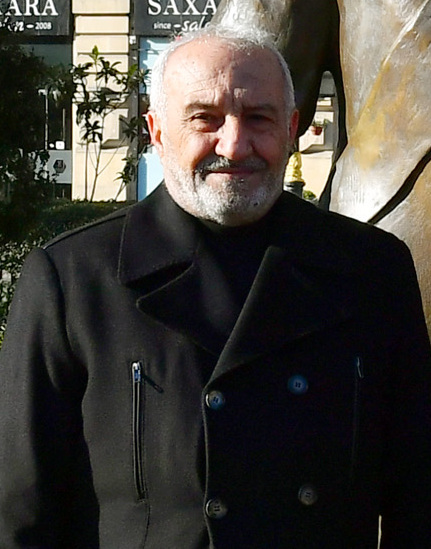
- Born: June 12, 1946 (age 79); Baku, Azerbaijan SSR, USSR
- Education: Tashkent Theatrical-Art Institute
- Occupation: sculptor
- Awards: Honored Artist of Azerbaijan

Khanlar Ahmed oghlu Ahmedov (Azerbaijani: Xanlar Əhməd oğlu Əhmədov, born June 12, 1946) is an Azerbaijani painter-sculptor, People's Artist of Azerbaijan (2006).

== Biography ==
Khanlar Ahmedov was born on June 12, 1946, in Baku. In 1961–1966, he studied at Azimzade Art Technical College, and in 1966–1972 at the Tashkent Theatrical-Art Institute.

Khanlar Ahmadov is the author of large-scale relief works at Azadlig prospekti metro station and a number of famous monumental projects.

He became a member of the Artists' Union of the USSR in 1975. His works have been exhibited in France, Germany, Iran, Poland, Russia, Ukraine, Uzbekistan and other countries. A number of his works are kept in various museums and private collections.

== Awards ==
- People's Artist of Azerbaijan — December 29, 2006
- Honored Artist of Azerbaijan—May 30, 2002
- Humay Award — 1995, 1996
