= Khoza Mamayev =

Chechen military commander (c. 1820–1855)

Khoza
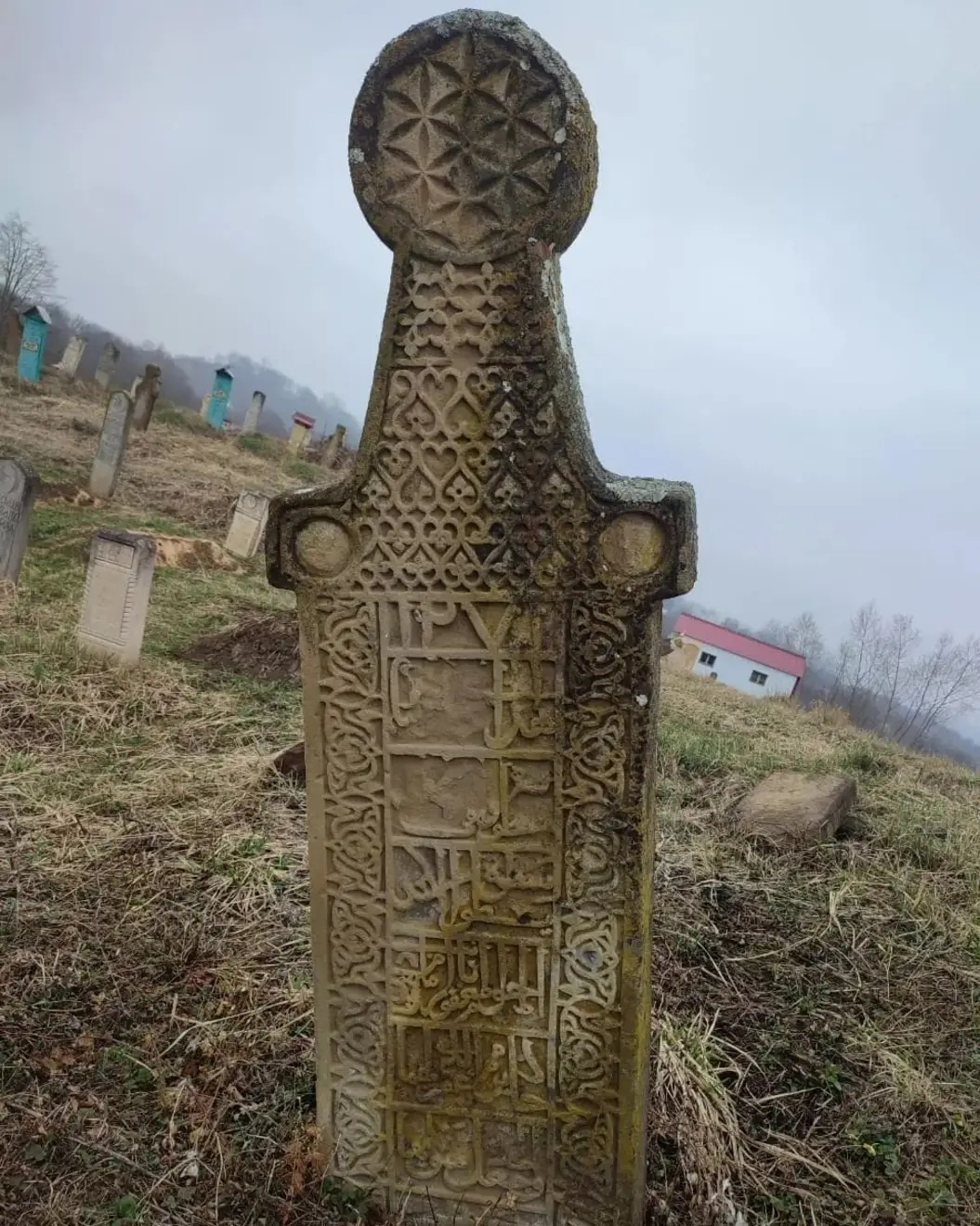
- The tomb of Khoza
- Born: c. 1820; Gendergen, Chechnya
- Died: 1855 (aged 34–35); Aukh, Chechnya, Caucasian Imamate
- Military career
- Allegiance: Caucasian Imamate
- Branch: Army
- Service years: 1840-1855
- Rank: Naib
- Commands: Aukh sector
- Conflicts: Caucasian War

Khoza (Russian: Хоза Мамаев; c. 1820 – 1855) was a 19th-century Chechen commander and naib of Aukh after his appointment by Shamil in 1851. He died in 1855 during a battle with the Russian army. Khoza was of the Gendargenoy teip and Mammi-Nek'e (Branch of a teip).
