= Bobomurat Ahmedov =

Uzbek theoretical physicist and astrophysicist (born 1963)

Bobomurat Ahmedov is an Uzbek physicist and academic. In November 2018, Ahmedov was elected as Fellow of The World Academy of Sciences (TWAS) in Trieste. In December 2020, Ahmedov was elected as Fellow of Islamic World Academy of Sciences (FIAS). He was honored as one of the "best scientists of the year" in the 2018 Scopus Awards. He was elected a Fellow of the International Core Academy of Sciences and Humanities.

He became a member of the Academy of Sciences of Uzbekistan on December 23, 2023, according to the decree of the President of Uzbekistan Sh Mirziyoyev.
