= Nuriyya Ahmadova =

Azerbaijani actress

Nuriyya Ahmadova (Azerbaijani: Nuriyyə Əhmədova; 26 December 1950 – 10 October 2015) was an Azerbaijani actress. She was a People's Artist of the Azerbaijani republic and a presidential scholar.

== Life and career ==
Ahmadova was born on December 26, 1950, in Baku (or, according to some sources, Sheki). She started acting at a comedy theater in 1968, but went on to the Azerbaijan State University of Culture and Arts from 1970 to 1974. In 2007, she was awarded the honorary title of People's Artist of Azerbaijan. She had two children and a grandchild. She died in Baku on 10 October 2015 following a heart attack.
