= Roshni-Chu =

Village in Urus-Martanovsky District, Russia

Coordinates: 43°05′N 45°27′E

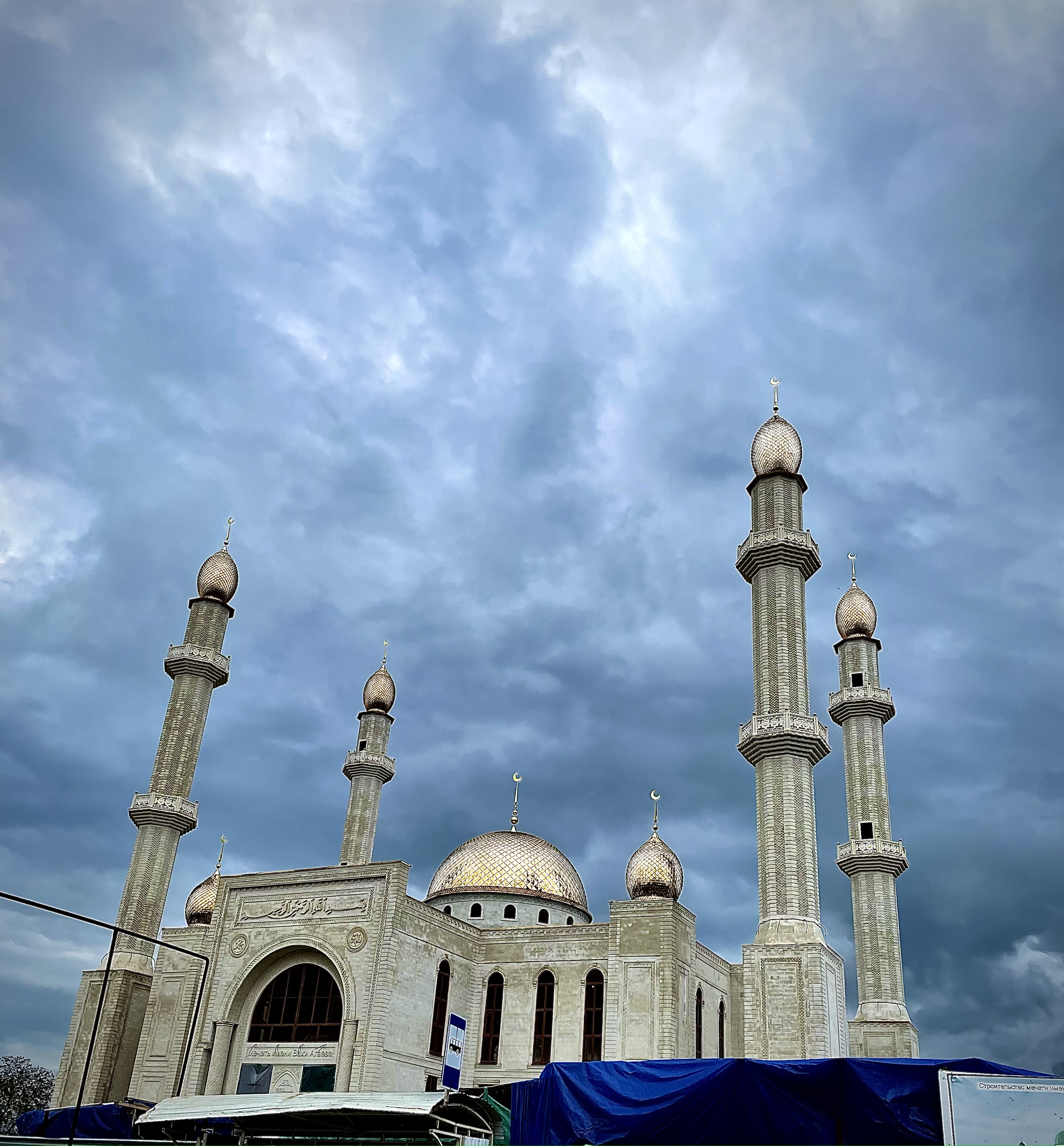
Roshni-Chu Central Mosque

Roshni-chu (Russian: Рошни-Чу; Chechen: Роьшни-Чу, Röşni-Çu) is a rural locality (a selo) in Urus-Martanovsky District of the Chechen Republic, Russia, located about 23 kilometers (14 mi) southwest of Grozny. Population: 5,195 (2010 census); 4,244 (2002 census).

On August 14, 2005, a militant group attacked the village and five officials from the regional military head of Urus-Martanovsky District and Colonel Alexander Kayak were killed and one person was seriously wounded.
