= Laila Akhmetova =

Kazakh academic (born 1954)

Laila Seysembekovna Akhmetova
- Ләйлә Сейсембекқызы Ахметова
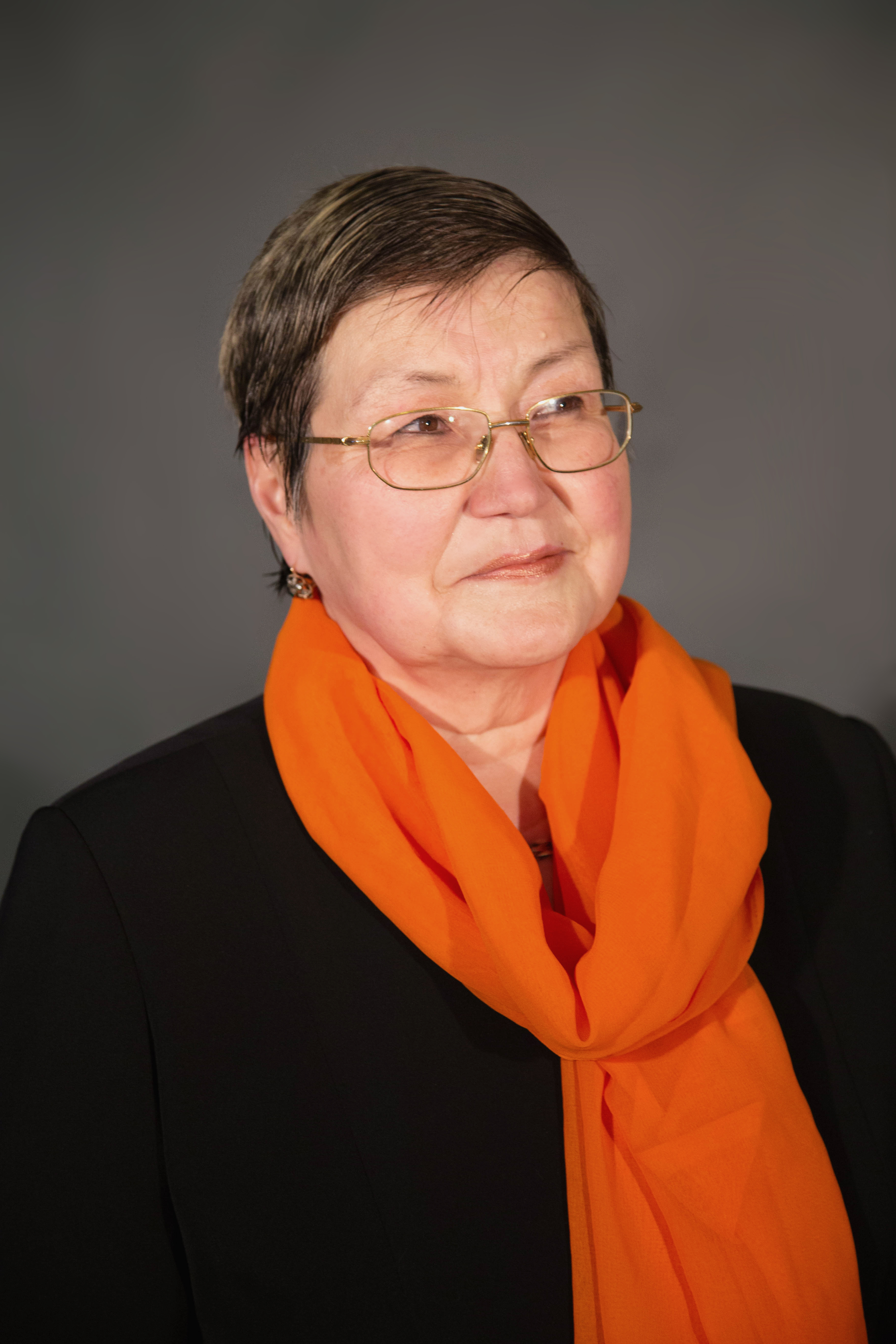
- Born: 12 February 1954 (age 72); Alma-Ata, Kazakh ASSR, Soviet Union
- Education: Doctor of historical science
- Occupation: Professor at Al-Farabi Kazakh National University
- Writing career
- Genre: History of Great Patriotic war
- Notable awards: The Order of Kurmet, Medal "10 years of Astana"

Laila Seysembekovna Akhmetova (born 12 February 1954) is a Kazakh doctor of historical sciences, professor of politology of Al-Farabi Kazakh National University, writer and researcher of participants in World War II.

== Current activity ==
Akhmetova is the Director of UNESCO centre of Al-Farabi Kazakh National University.

She is also the President of the ULE "Almaty confederation of non-governmental organizations nicknamed "Ariptes".

The women's trade union movement in Kazakhstan is inextricably linked to the name of L.S. Akhmetova. She is the chairman of the Commission on Women Workers, a part of the Trade Union Federation of Kazakhstan. She is an active participant in the women's network of the International Trade Unions Confederation. Currently, under the leadership of L.S. Akhmetova, the Commission is actively working on the issues of women workers, labour and safety, maternity and health of women, family and children, leisure and welfare.

In addition, she is a member of the National Coordinating Council for combatting the worst forms of child labour under the Ministry of Social Development of Kazakhstan as well as the Deputy Chairman (2008–2011) and member (2011–current time) of the Almaty City Council for Cooperation and Interaction with non-governmental organizations under the Akimat of Almaty. She is also involved with the NGO Council set up by the Government of Kazakhstan.

== Major works ==
- Akhmetova, Laila (1996). Патриотизм в ракурсе истории (in Russian). Almaty: Sanat. ISBN 978-5-7090-0322-4. OCLC 78466777.
- Ahmetova, Laila (2009). Председательство Казахстана в ОБСЕ в 2010 году: опыт работы НПО южного региона страны (in Russian). Almaty: Ariptes. ISBN 978-601-247-013-0. OCLC 1014113727.
- Akhmetova, Laila; Verevkin, Aleksey; Lifanova, Tatyana (2010). Almaty—men tūratyn qala/Алматы—город, в котором я живу. Almaty: publisher not identified. ISBN 978-9965-23-201-5. OCLC 777182657.
- Ashimbaev, Daniil (2012). Кто есть кто в Казахстане: Биографическая энциклопедия. 2012-2013 (in Russian). Almaty: Credo. ISBN 978-601-06-1906-7. OCLC 885159172.
- "Медиабілім беру және киберәлеуметтену" атты халықаралық ғылыми-тәжірибелік конференция : материалдары 25 ақпан 2014 (in Kazakh). Almaty: Kazakh University. 2014. ISBN 978-601-04-0341-3. OCLC 1125983067.
- Akhmetova, Laila; Grigoriev, Vladislav (2010). Первые лица Казахстана в сталинскую эпоху (in Russian). IP Volkova A.V. ISBN 978-601-247-061-1. OCLC 74621828.
- Grigoriev, Vladislav; Akhmetova, Laila (2011). Яростный 1941: размышления историков (in Russian). Almaty: al-farabi Kazakh National University. ISBN 978-601-247-167-0. OCLC 758487676.
- Grigoriev, Vladislav; Akhmetova, Laila (2014). Панфиловцы: 60 дней подвига, ставших легендой (in Russian). Almaty: Союз женщин интеллектуального труда. ISBN 978-601-247-965-2. OCLC 894589848.
- Akhmetova, Laila (2016). 1941: Брестская крепость: Казахстан (in Russian). Almaty: ИП Волкова Е.В. ISBN 978-601-7047-56-6. OCLC 967966186.

== Awards ==
- Commemorative Sign of the United Nations Children's Fund for a special contribution to the improvement of the situation of children and the protection of their rights in the Republic of Kazakhstan (2007)
- The Order of Kurmet (2011)
- The Medal for Distinguished Labor (2019)
