= Semiray Ahmedova =

Luxembourgish architect and politician

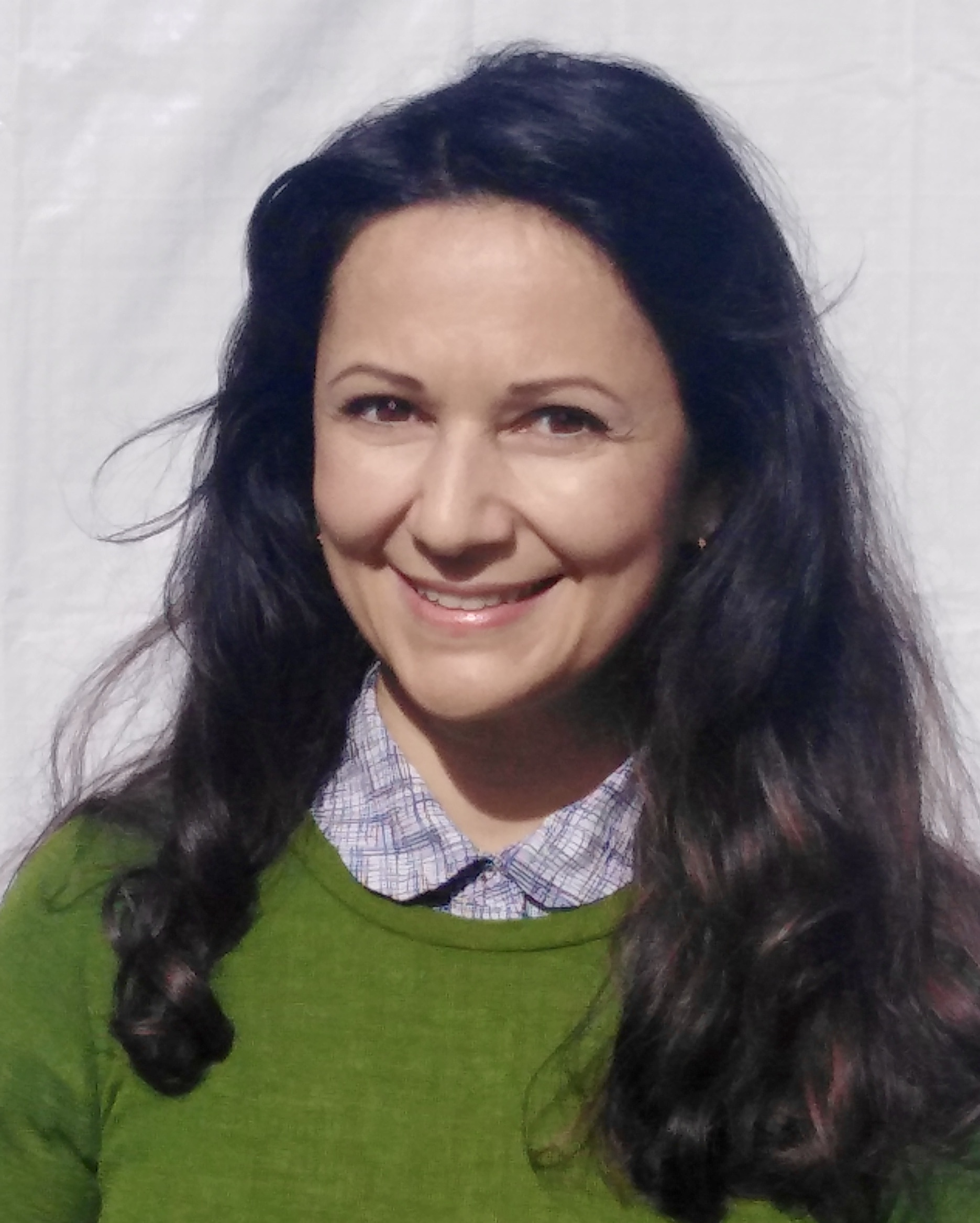

Member of the Chamber of Deputies of Luxembourg
- In office 8 October 2019 – 24 October 2023
- Preceded by: Roberto Traversini (resigned)
- Constituency: South

Personal details
- Born: 21 April 1981 (age 44) Sofia, Bulgaria
- Party: The Greens
- Occupation: Architect

Semiray Ahmedova (born 21 April 1981 in Sofia, Bulgaria) is a Bulgarian-born Luxembourgish architect and politician of The Greens. She served in the Chamber of Deputies from 2019 to 2023.

== Biography ==
Born in 1981 in the Bulgarian capital Sofia, she became a citizen of Luxembourg in 2004. At the age of 9, she fled the communist regime of the People's Republic of Bulgaria with her parents. She attended school in Dudelange and later studied architecture and urban planning in Brussels. She went back to Luxembourg and worked in an architectural firm, later as an advisor for sustainable building at myenergy agency, before she joined the Ministry of Spatial Planning. She describes herself as a "Dudelange girl" (Diddelenger Meedchen in Luxembourgish).

Ahmedova joined The Greens party in 2017. She failed to win a seat in the Dudelang municipal council in the 2017 communal elections. She stood in the 2018 general election in the South constituency but failed to win a seat, since she was in ninth position on The Greens' list and the party won three seats only. However, she later replaced resigning deputy Roberto Traversini and became the youngest deputy of Luxembourg on October 8, 2019.

Ahmedova's political work focuses on energy and environmental policy, as well as on fighting the rising housing prices in Luxembourg.
