= Huta Akhmadov =

Chechen colonel (1970–1999)

- Born: 26 September 1972; Urus-Martan, USSR
- Died: 5 September 1999 (aged 26); Novolakskoye, Russia
- Relatives: Brothers, Rizvan Akhmadov, Ramzan Akhmadov, Zelimkhan Akhmadov
- Military career
- Allegiance: Chechen Republic of Ichkeria
- Branch: Chechen National Guard
- Service years: 1989-1999
- Rank: Colonel
- Conflicts: Soviet–Afghan War; First Chechen War; Battle of Grozny (1994–95); War of Dagestan

Huta Adlanovich Akhmadov (Russian: Хута Адланович Ахмадов, also known by his Arabic name Abdurrakhman; 26 September 1972 – 5 September 1999) was a Chechen military leader and close friend of Arab Amir Ibn al-Khattab, who fought against Soviet and Russian forces in Afghanistan and Chechnya.

Akhmadov died at the start of the Second Chechen War after being shot in the eye with a sniper rifle.
