= Rizvan Akhmadov =

Chechen military commander during the Second Chechen War

- Born: 6 September 1957; Taldykorgan, Kazakh Soviet Socialist Republic, Soviet Union
- Died: 26 June 2002 (aged 44); Shalinsky District, Chechnya
- Relatives: Brothers, Ramzan Akhmadov, Huta Akhmadov, Zelimkhan Akhmadov
- Military career
- Allegiance: Chechen Republic of Ichkeria
- Branch: Chechen National Guard
- Service years: 1994-2002
- Rank: Brigadier General
- Conflicts: First Chechen War; Second Chechen War
- Awards: (Chechen Republic of Ichkeria) Qoman Siy

Rizvan (Dadu) Akhmadov (Russian: Ризван Адланович Ахмадов; 6 September 1957 – 26 June 2002) was a Chechen military commander and commander of the Central Front of the Chechen Armed Forces during the Second Chechen War. Rizvan was of the Ghendargnoy teip and Appaz-Nek'e (Branch of a teip).

== Biography ==
=== Early life ===
Rizvan Akhmadov was born on 6 September 1957 in the Taldykorgan region of Kazakhstan, where his parents were deported by the Soviet regime. He was from the Gendargnoy teip. After returning from deportation, he served in the Soviet army.

=== First Chechen war ===
During the First Chechen War, he was severely wounded in the Urus-Martanovsky District of Chechnya and survived thanks to his brother Ramzan Akhmadov, who brought him out of the encirclement of Russian troops.

=== Second Chechen war ===
During the Second Chechen War, Rizvan Akhmadov commanded the Central Front of the Ichkerian Army. Under his leadership, the Chechens waged the most successful sabotage war against Russia, during which many Russian servicemen and Chechens who collaborated with Russia were killed.

=== Death ===
On June 27, 2002, while on his way to meet with President Aslan Maskhadov, Rizvan Akhmadov stopped for a rest in the Shalinsky District. As he was leaving the house, pro-Russian Chechen forces sitting in ambush at the gate opened fire. Rizvan Akhmadov was badly wounded, but he shot back as long as he could, took a grenade and pulled the pin to avoid being captured.
