= Zelimkhan Akhmadov =

Chechen general and commander (1975–2002)

- Born: 24 September 1975; Urus-Martan, Checheno-Ingush ASSR, Soviet Union
- Died: 14 September 2002 (aged 26); Chechen–Aul, Chechnya
- Spouse: 2
- Children: 2
- Relatives: Brothers, Rizvan Akhmadov, Ramzan Akhmadov, Huta Akhmadov
- Military career
- Allegiance: Chechen Republic of Ichkeria
- Branch: Chechen National Guard
- Rank: Brigadier general
- Nickname: Executioner
- Commands: Urus-Martan sector Islamic brigade
- Conflicts: First Chechen War; War of Dagestan; Second Chechen War
- Awards: Honor of the Nation

Zelimkhan Adlanovich Akhmadov (Russian: Зелимхан Адланович Ахмадов; 24 September 1975 – 14 September 2002) was a Chechen militant leader who was the commander of the Grozny and Urus-Martan sectors during the Second Chechen War, taking part in the killing of hundreds of Russian soldiers and Chechen collaborators. He is accused of perpetrating the ambush against OMON members in Grozny which killed 17 members and injured five more.

Akhmadov was blown up in a booby-trapped car on 14 September 2002 in retaliation for the killing of 18 members of the pro-Russian Chechen OMON.
