= Shatoy =

Shatoy Шатой
- Selo

Other transcription(s)
  - Chechen: Шуьйта
- Interactive map of Shatoy
- Location of Shatoy Shatoy (Chechnya)
- Coordinates: 42°52′12″N 45°41′26″E
- Country: Russia
- Federal subject: Chechnya
- Administrative district: Shatoysky District
- Founded: 1858
- Elevation: 608 m (1,995 ft)

Population (2010 Census)
  - Total: 2,953
  - Estimate (1926): 830 (−71.9%)
- Time zone: UTC+3 (MSK)
- Postal code: 366400
- OKTMO ID: 96628422101

Shatoy (Russian: Шато́й; Chechen: Шуьйта, romanized: Şüyta) is a rural locality (a selo) and the administrative center of Shatoysky District of the Chechen Republic, Russia. Population: 2,953 (2010 census); 1,771 (2002 census).

== Geography ==
It is located in the southern part of the republic, on the right bank of the Argun River, in the Argun Gorge. Grozny is 57 km away.

The nearest settlements: in the north-west - the villages of Hakkoy, Syuzhi and Great Varanda; in the northeast - the village of Zones; in the southeast, the villages of Bekum-Kale and Pamyat; in the south, the villages of Varda and Gush-Kurt; in the south-west is the village of Vashindara [3].

=== Climate ===
Shatoy has a humid continental climate (Köppen climate classification: Dfb).

Climate data for Shatoy
Month	Jan	Feb	Mar	Apr	May	Jun	Jul	Aug	Sep	Oct	Nov	Dec	Year
Mean daily maximum °C (°F)	1.7 (35.1)	2.7 (36.9)	6.2 (43.2)	11.5 (52.7)	16.5 (61.7)	20.0 (68.0)	22.5 (72.5)	22.8 (73.0)	18.4 (65.1)	13.2 (55.8)	7.5 (45.5)	3.7 (38.7)	12.2 (54.0)
Daily mean °C (°F)	−3.7 (25.3)	−2.3 (27.9)	1.2 (34.2)	6.6 (43.9)	12.0 (53.6)	15.9 (60.6)	18.5 (65.3)	18.5 (65.3)	14.0 (57.2)	8.7 (47.7)	2.1 (35.8)	−2.0 (28.4)	7.5 (45.4)
Mean daily minimum °C (°F)	−8.8 (16.2)	−7.3 (18.9)	−4.2 (24.4)	1.1 (34.0)	6.7 (44.1)	10.7 (51.3)	13.5 (56.3)	13.6 (56.5)	9.4 (48.9)	4.4 (39.9)	−2.6 (27.3)	−6.9 (19.6)	2.5 (36.4)
Average precipitation mm (inches)	40 (1.6)	45 (1.8)	95 (3.7)	155 (6.1)	235 (9.3)	324 (12.8)	333 (13.1)	310 (12.2)	207 (8.1)	107 (4.2)	54 (2.1)	38 (1.5)	1,943 (76.5)
Average precipitation days	7	7	11	13	17	17	17	17	13	10	6	6	141
Average relative humidity (%)	72	73	78	80	81	81	80	80	83	81	78	73	78
Mean monthly sunshine hours	201.5	194.9	210.8	210.0	241.8	258.0	266.6	269.7	210.0	201.5	201.0	201.5	2,667.3
Mean daily sunshine hours	6.5	6.9	6.8	7.0	7.8	8.6	8.6	8.7	7.0	6.5	6.7	6.5	7.3
