= Argun, Chechen Republic =

Argun Аргун
- Town

Other transcription(s)
  - Chechen: Устрада
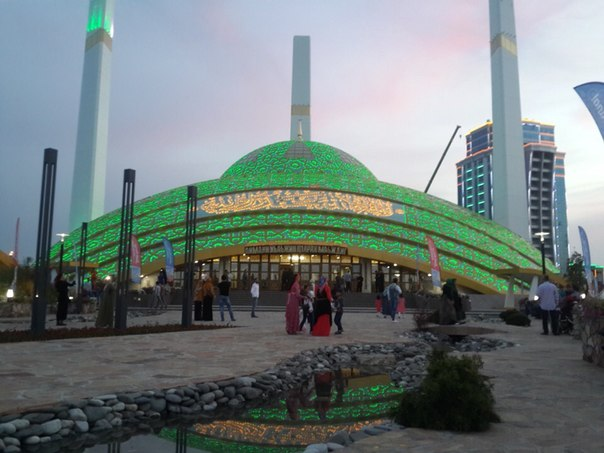
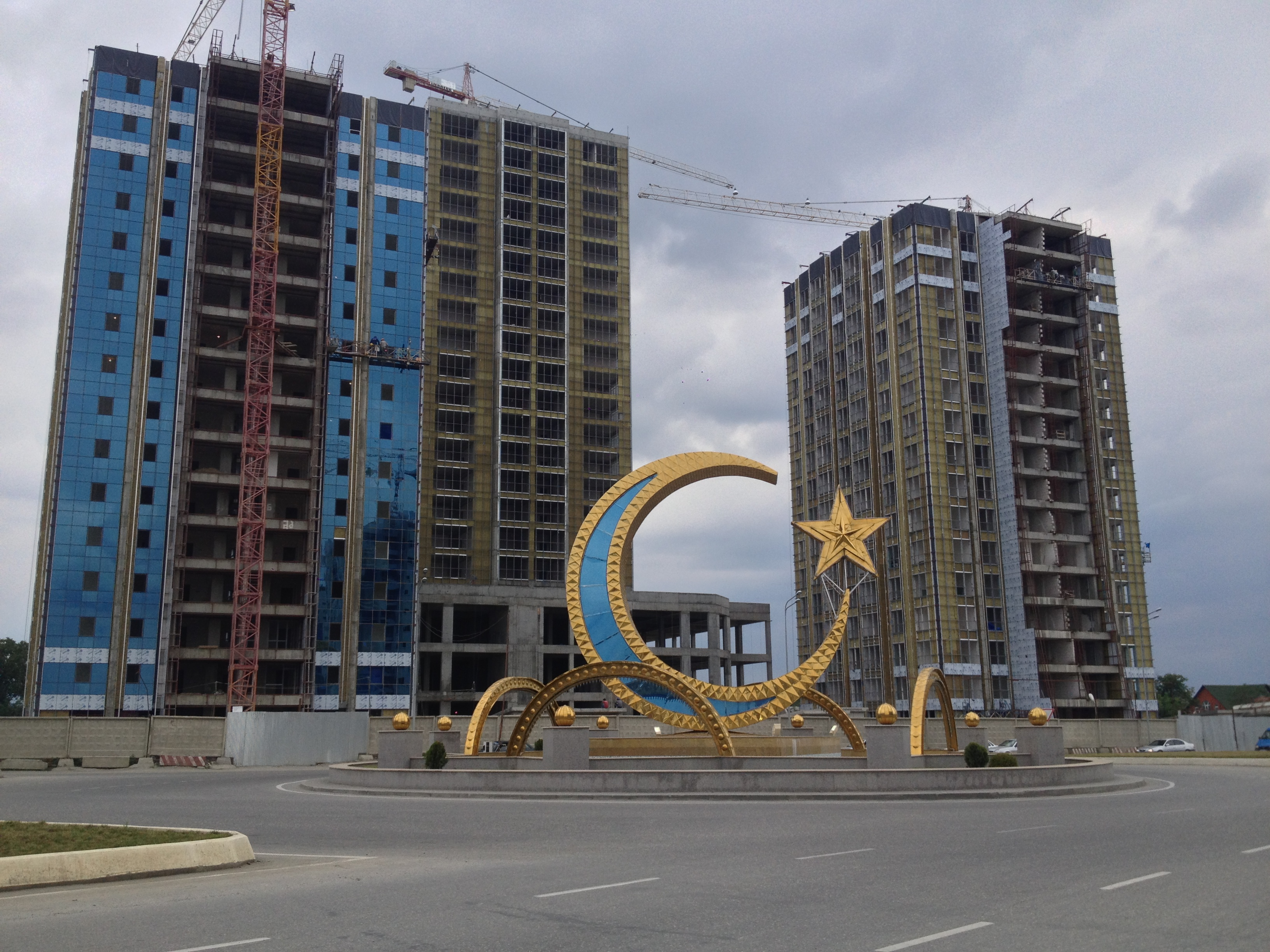
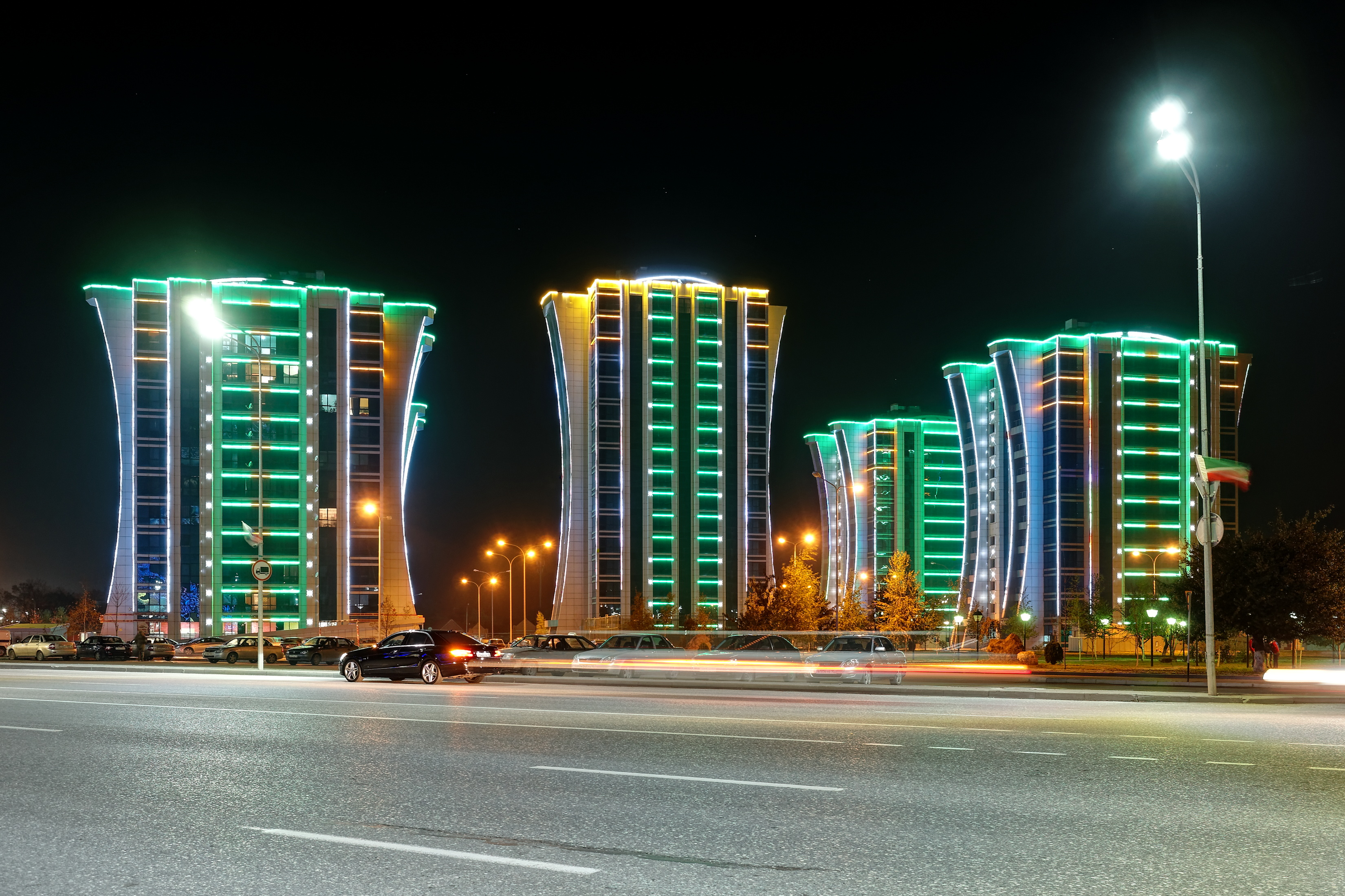
- From the top, Haja Aymani Kadyrova mosque in Argun, Islamic Monument, Modern Apartment Complex

- Flag Coat of arms
- Interactive map of Argun
- Location of Argun Argun (Chechnya)
- Coordinates: 43°17′40″N 45°53′02″E
- Country: Russia
- Federal subject: Chechnya
- Founded: 1819

Area
  - Total: 28 km^{2} (11 sq mi)
- Elevation: 116 m (381 ft)

Population (2010 Census)
  - Total: 29,525
  - Estimate (2025): 42,126 (+42.7%)
  - Density: 1,100/km^{2} (2,700/sq mi)

Administrative status
  - Subordinated to: town of republic significance of Argun
  - Capital of: town of republic significance of Argun

Municipal status
  - Urban okrug: Argun Urban Okrug
  - Capital of: Argun Urban Okrug
- Time zone: UTC+3 (MSK)
- Postal codes: 366281–366287, 366310
- OKTMO ID: 96702000001

Argun (Russian: Аргу́н, pronounced [ɐrˈgun]), also known as Ustrada (Chechen: Устрада-ГӀала, Ustrada-Ġala or Орга-ГӀала, Orga-Ġala) is a town in the Chechen Republic, Russia, located on the Argun River. Population: 29,525 (2010 census); 25,698 (2002 census); 25,491 (1989 Soviet census); 22,000 (1968).

In April 2017 the independent Russian newspaper Novaya Gazeta documented that Chechen authorities had set up so-called "gay concentration camps", within the town.

== Administrative and municipal status ==
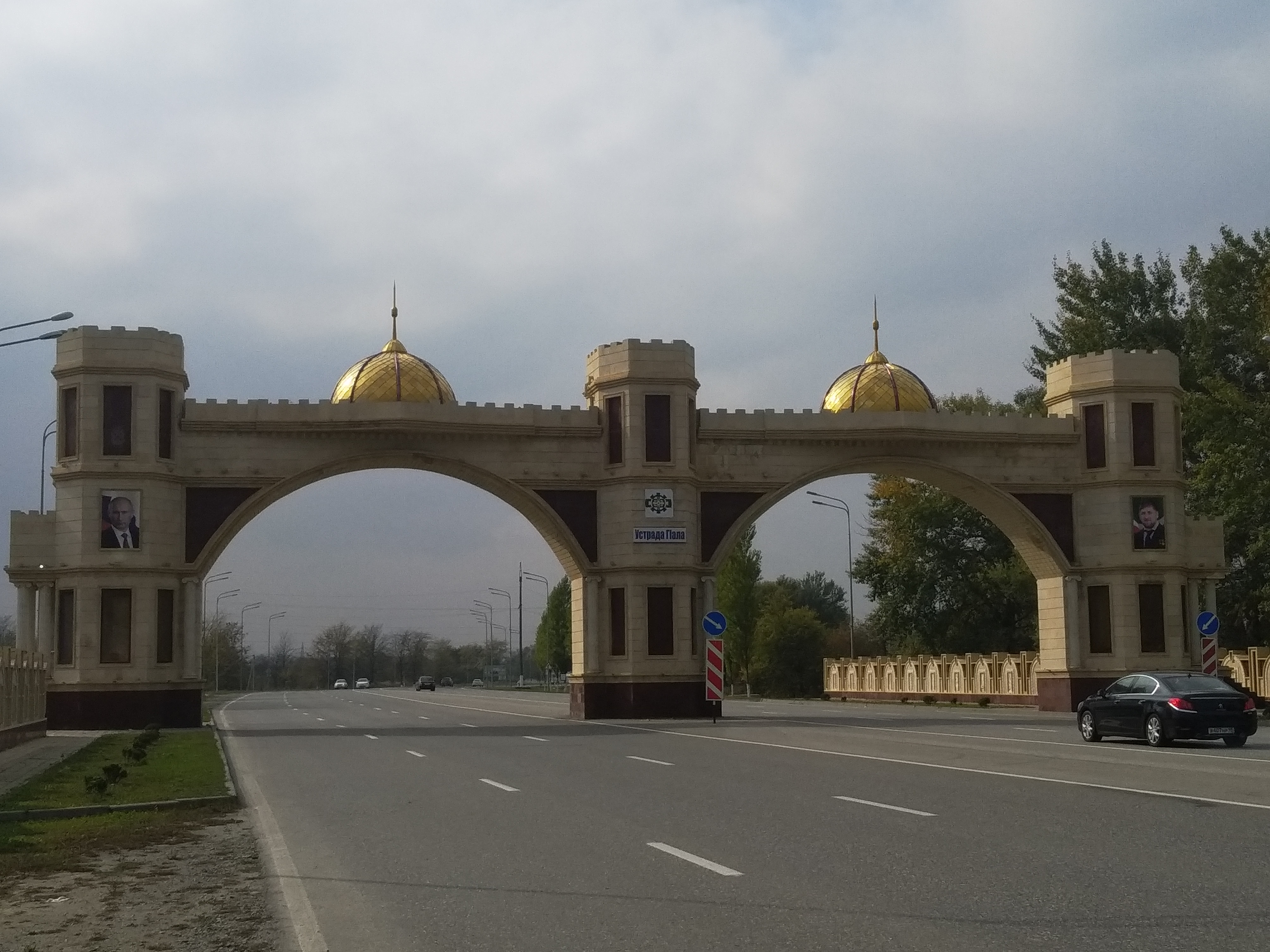
Entrance to Argun

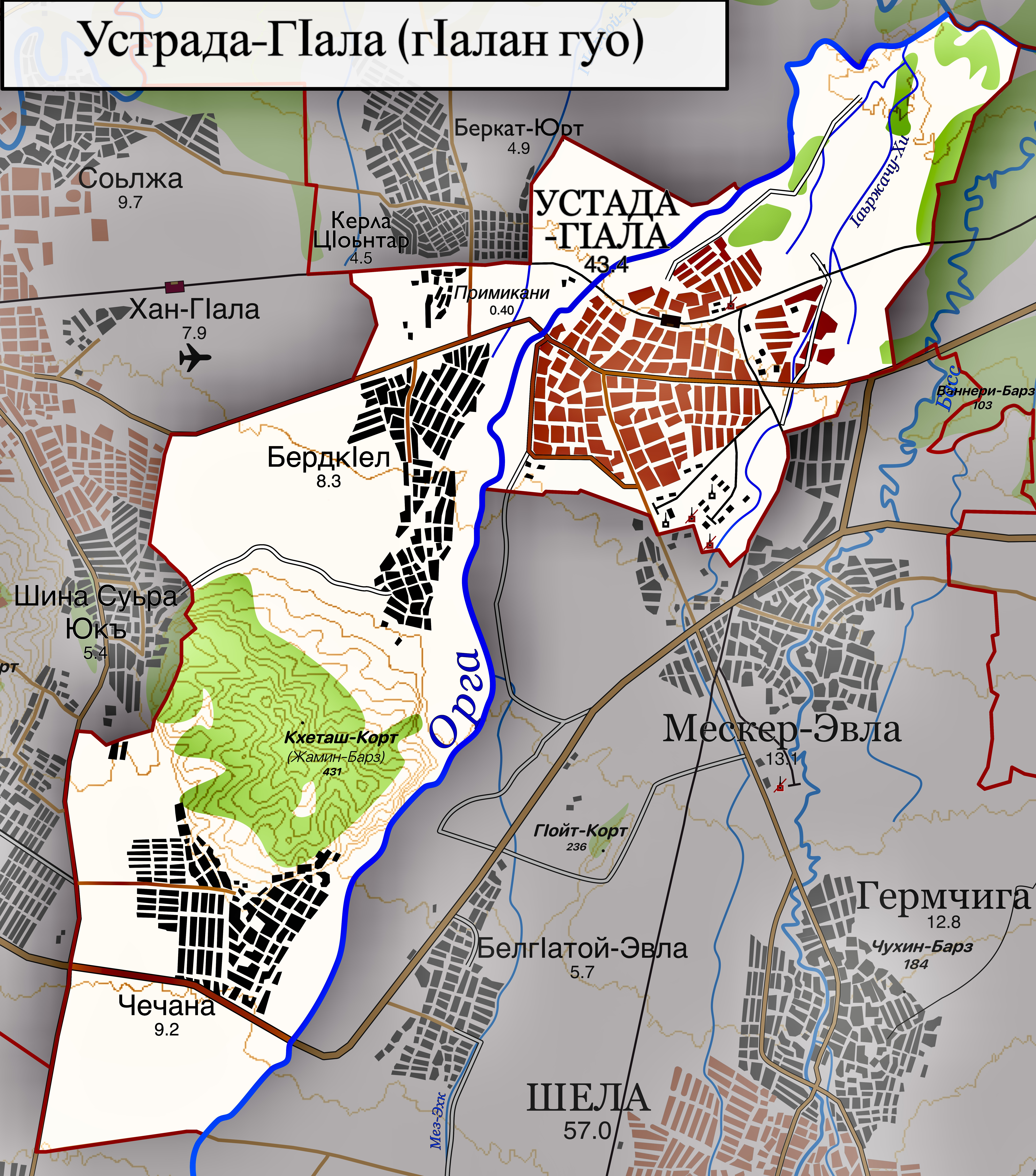
Argun urban district (in Chechen)

Within the framework of administrative divisions, it is incorporated as the town of republic significance of Argun—an administrative unit with the status equal to that of the districts. As a municipal division, the town of republic significance of Argun is incorporated as Argun Urban Okrug.

== Climate ==
Argun has a humid continental climate (Köppen climate classification: Dfa).

Climate data for Argun
Month	Jan	Feb	Mar	Apr	May	Jun	Jul	Aug	Sep	Oct	Nov	Dec	Year
Mean daily maximum °C (°F)	1.1 (34.0)	2.8 (37.0)	8.4 (47.1)	17.5 (63.5)	23.5 (74.3)	27.8 (82.0)	30.4 (86.7)	29.9 (85.8)	24.5 (76.1)	16.7 (62.1)	9.3 (48.7)	3.4 (38.1)	16.3 (61.3)
Daily mean °C (°F)	−2.3 (27.9)	−1.0 (30.2)	4.0 (39.2)	11.6 (52.9)	17.5 (63.5)	21.8 (71.2)	24.5 (76.1)	23.9 (75.0)	18.8 (65.8)	11.7 (53.1)	5.6 (42.1)	0.4 (32.7)	11.4 (52.5)
Mean daily minimum °C (°F)	−5.6 (21.9)	−4.8 (23.4)	−0.3 (31.5)	5.7 (42.3)	11.6 (52.9)	15.9 (60.6)	18.7 (65.7)	17.9 (64.2)	13.1 (55.6)	6.8 (44.2)	1.9 (35.4)	−2.6 (27.3)	6.5 (43.8)
Average precipitation mm (inches)	22 (0.9)	23 (0.9)	23 (0.9)	34 (1.3)	58 (2.3)	71 (2.8)	55 (2.2)	43 (1.7)	37 (1.5)	31 (1.2)	28 (1.1)	24 (0.9)	449 (17.7)
