= Urus-Martanovsky District =

Urus-Martanovsky District Урус-Мартановский район (Russian)
- District

Other transcription(s)
  - Chechen: Хьалха-Мартанан кӏошт
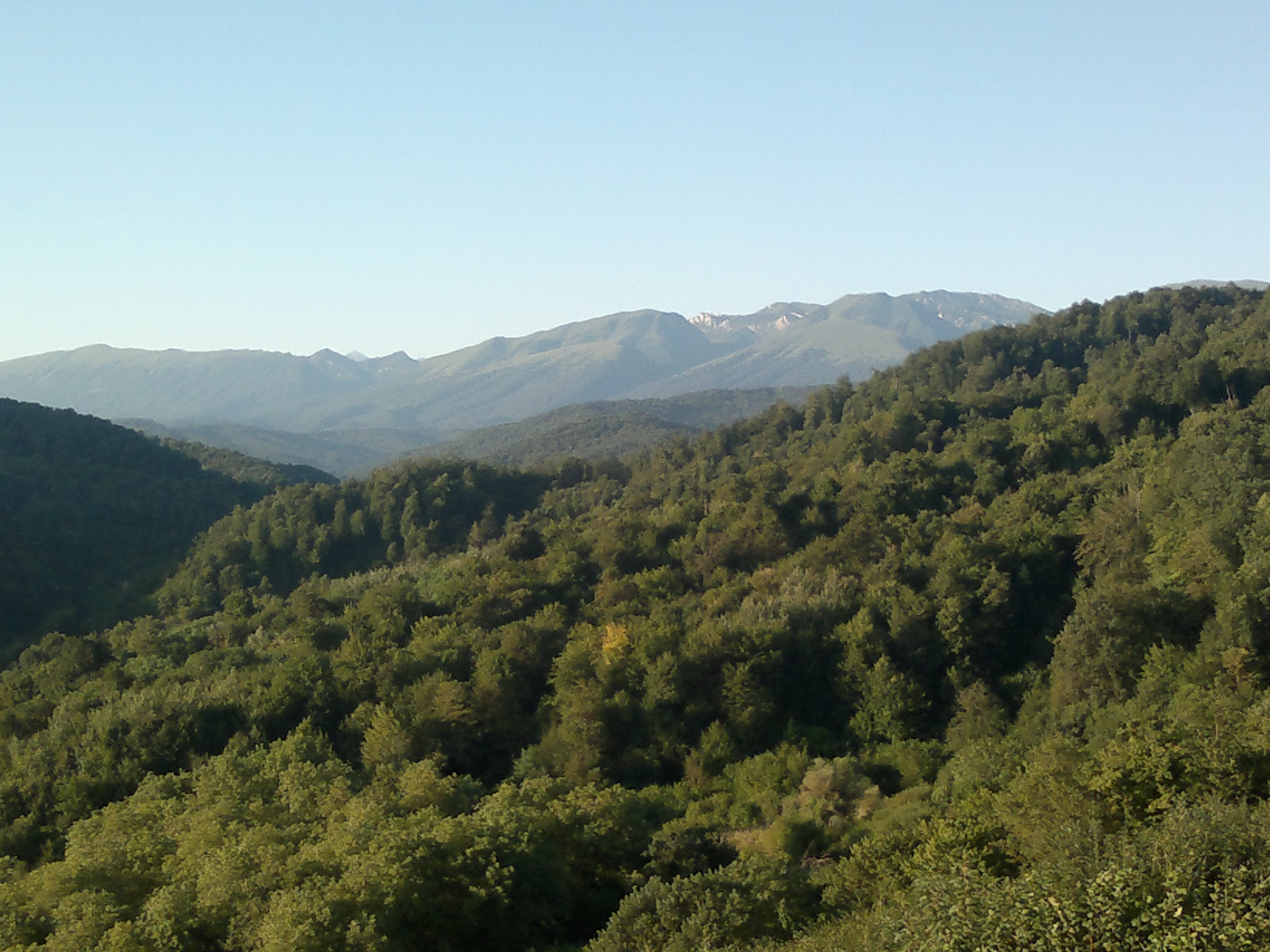
- Mountains in Urus-Martanovsky District

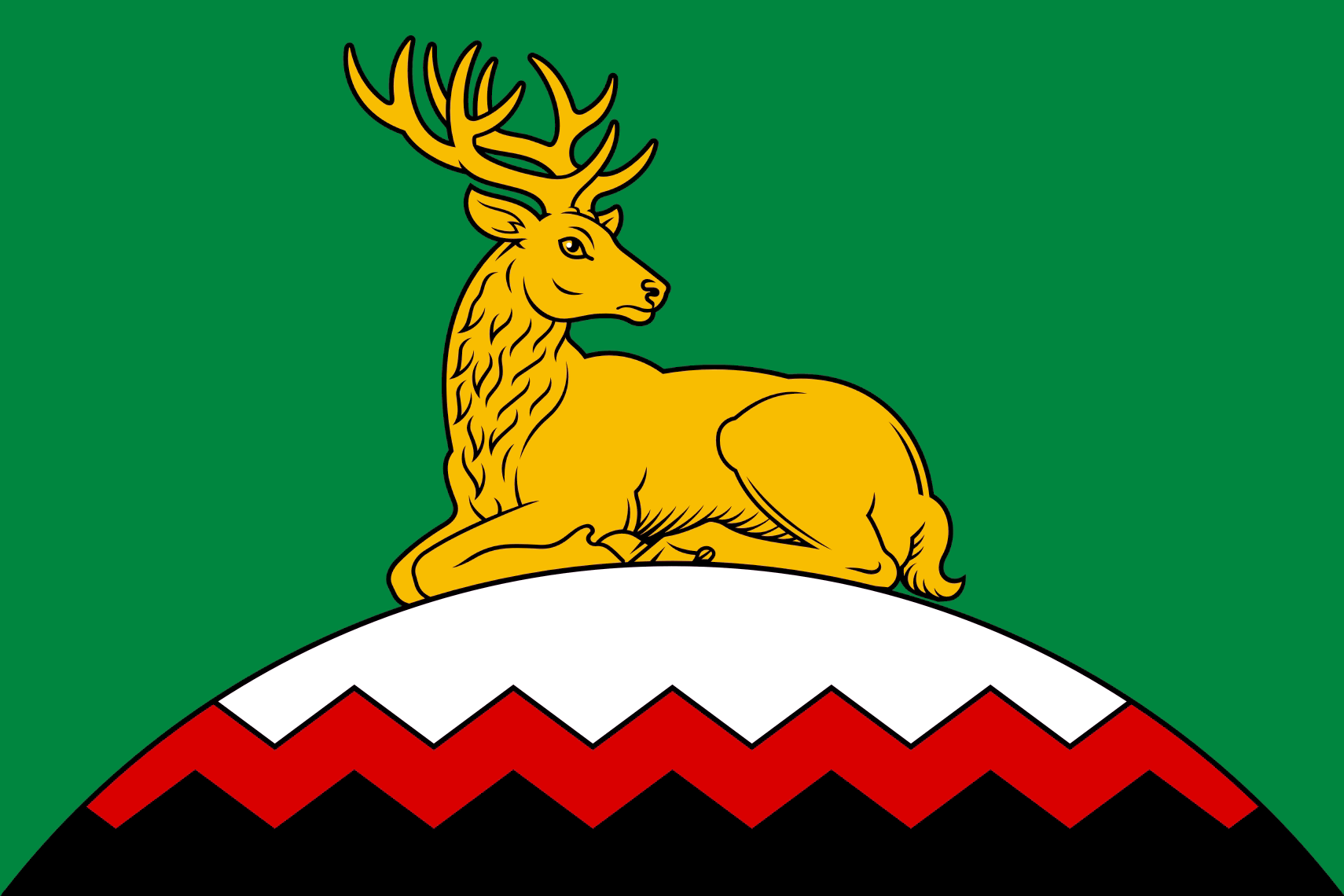
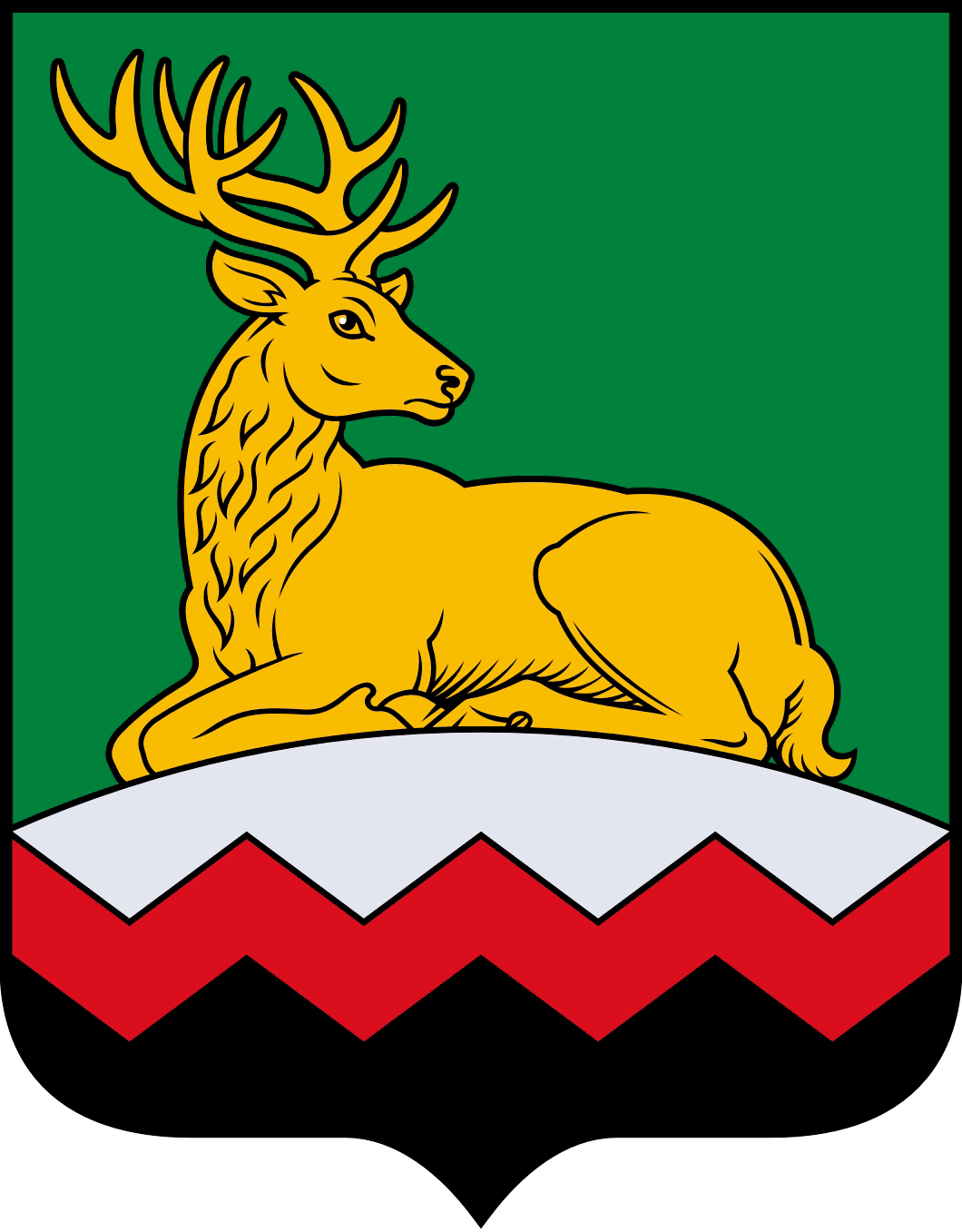
- Flag Coat of arms
- Location of Urus-Martanovsky District in the Chechen Republic
- Coordinates: 43°07′N 45°32′E
- Country: Russia
- Federal subject: Chechen Republic
- Established: 30 November 1922
- Administrative center: Urus-Martan

Area
  - Total: 650 km^{2} (250 sq mi)

Population (2010 Census)
  - Total: 120,585
  - Density: 190/km^{2} (480/sq mi)
  - Urban: 40.7%
  - Rural: 59.3%

Administrative structure
  - Administrative divisions: 1 Town administrations, 11 Rural administrations
  - Inhabited localities: 1 cities/towns, 13 rural localities

Municipal structure
  - Municipally incorporated as: Urus-Martanovsky Municipal District
  - Municipal divisions: 1 urban settlements, 11 rural settlements
- Time zone: UTC+3 (MSK)
- OKTMO ID: 96634000
- Website: http://u-martan.ru/

Urus-Martanovsky District (Russian: Уру́с-Марта́новский райо́н; Chechen: Хьалха-Мартанан кӏошт, Ẋalxa-Martanan khoşt) is an administrative and municipal district (raion), one of the fifteen in the Chechen Republic, Russia. It is located in the center of the republic. The area of the district is 650 square kilometers (250 sq mi). Its administrative center is the town of Urus-Martan. Population: 120,585 (2010 census); 61,181 (2002 Census); 85,087 (1989 Soviet census). The population of Urus-Martan accounts for 40.7% of the district's total population.

== Notable people ==
- Aza Bataeva (1983-2017), pop singer
