= Urus-Martan =

Urus-Martan Урус-Мартан
- Town

Other transcription(s)
  - Chechen: Хьалха-Марта, Мартантӏи
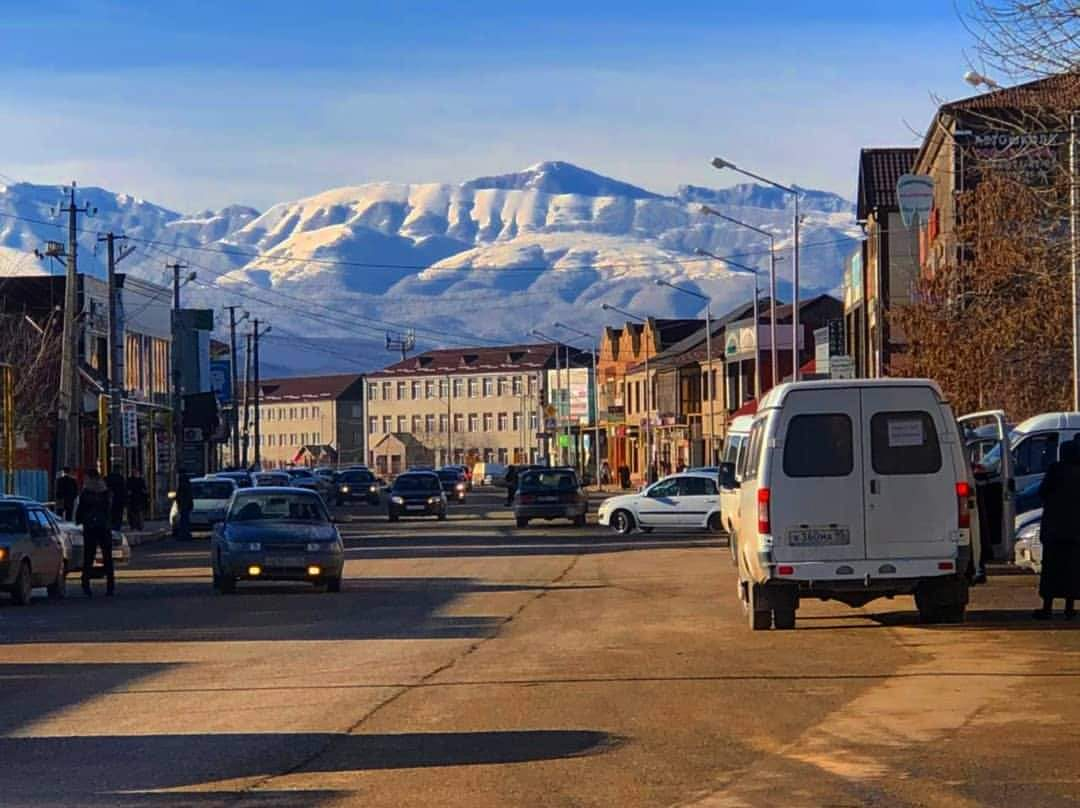
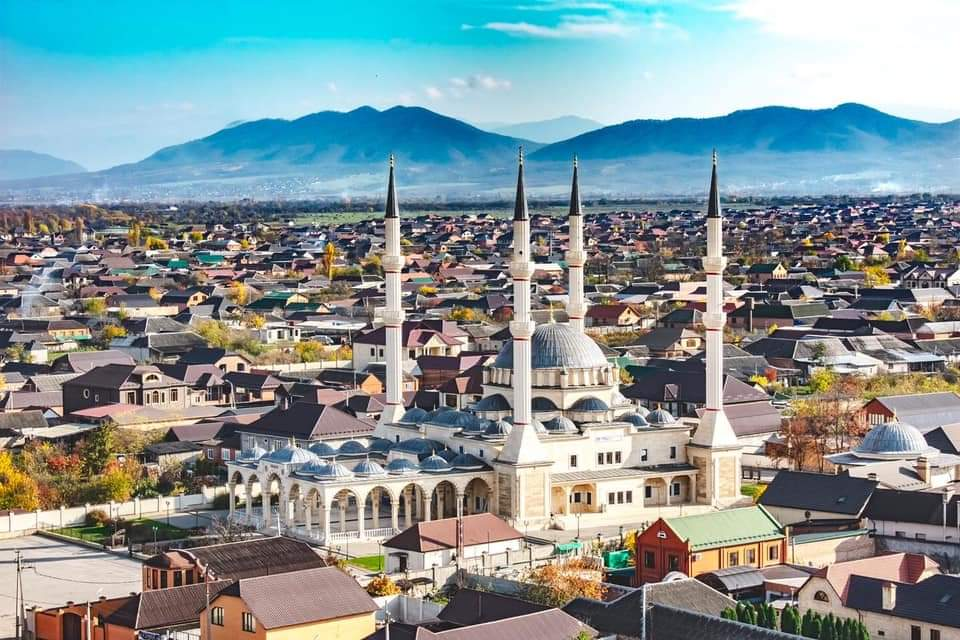
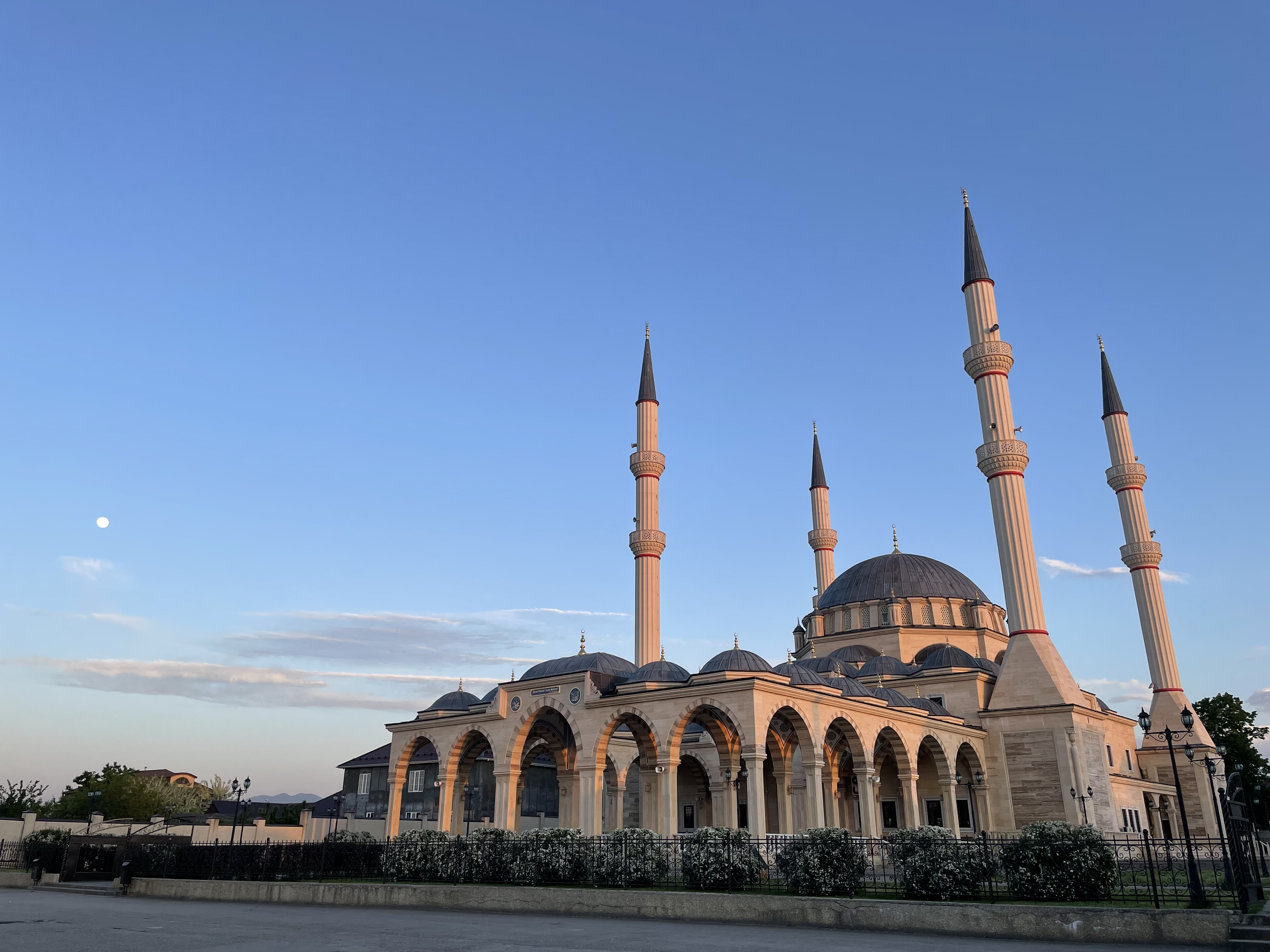
- From the top, Street Scene, Quarter of the Ghendargnoy teip, The Mosque
- Interactive map of Urus-Martan
- Location of Urus-Martan Urus-Martan (Chechnya)
- Coordinates: 43°08′N 45°33′E
- Country: Russia
- Federal subject: Chechnya
- Administrative district: Urus-Martanovsky District
- Town administrationSelsoviet: Urus-Martan
- Founded: 15th century (Julian)
- Elevation: 235 m (771 ft)

Population (2010 Census)
  - Total: 49,070
  - Estimate (2025): 63,830 (+30.1%)

Administrative status
  - Capital of: Urus-Martanovsky District, Urus-Martan Town Administration

Municipal status
  - Municipal district: Urus-Martanovsky Municipal District
  - Urban settlement: Urus-Martanovskoye Urban Settlement
  - Capital of: Urus-Martanovsky Municipal District, Urus-Martanovskoye Urban Settlement
- Time zone: UTC+3 (MSK)
- Postal code: 366500
- OKTMO ID: 96634101001

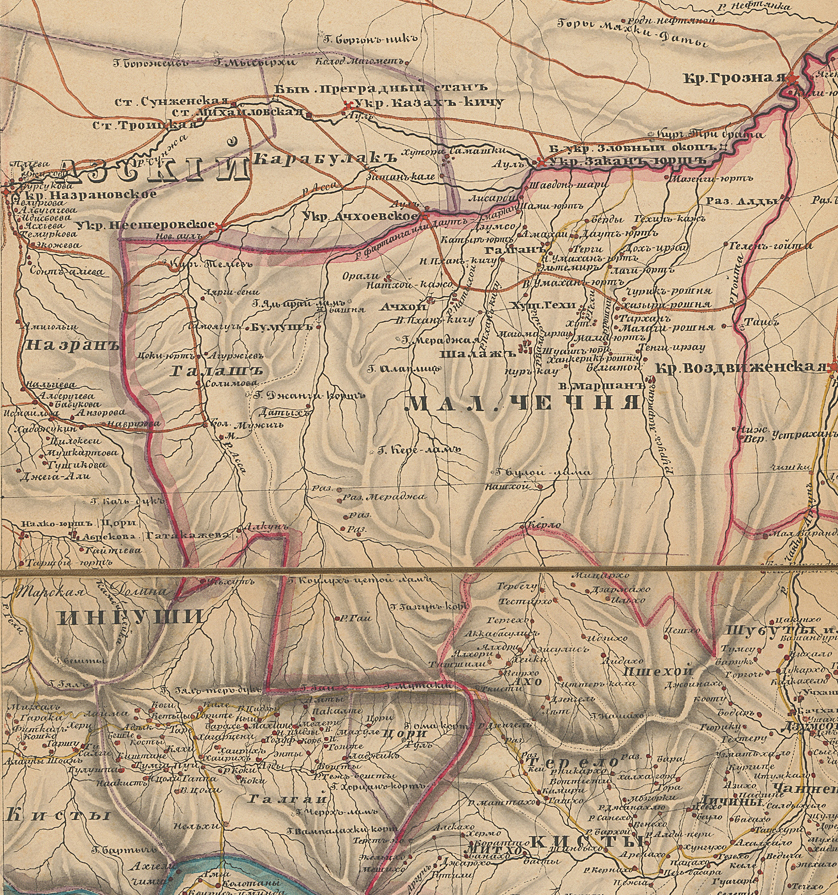
Chechenia in the map 1847 year

Urus-Martan (Russian: Уру́с-Марта́н; Chechen: Хьалха-Марта, Ẋalxa-Marta or Мартантӏи, Martanthi) is a town and the administrative center of Urus-Martanovsky District of the Chechen Republic, Russia, located on the Martan River. Population: 63,449 (2021 census); 49,070 (2010 census); 39,982 (2002 census); 32,851 (1989 Soviet census).

== Geography ==
The town is located in the central part of the republic, to the southwest of the capital Grozny.

=== Climate ===
Urus-Martan has a humid continental climate (Köppen climate classification: Dfa).

Climate data for Urus-Martan
Month	Jan	Feb	Mar	Apr	May	Jun	Jul	Aug	Sep	Oct	Nov	Dec	Year
Mean daily maximum °C (°F)	1.1 (34.0)	2.9 (37.2)	8.4 (47.1)	17.2 (63.0)	23.0 (73.4)	27.2 (81.0)	29.9 (85.8)	29.3 (84.7)	24.0 (75.2)	16.6 (61.9)	9.1 (48.4)	3.5 (38.3)	16.0 (60.8)
Daily mean °C (°F)	−2.4 (27.7)	−1.1 (30.0)	3.9 (39.0)	11.2 (52.2)	16.9 (62.4)	21.0 (69.8)	23.9 (75.0)	23.2 (73.8)	18.2 (64.8)	11.4 (52.5)	5.3 (41.5)	0.2 (32.4)	11.0 (51.8)
Mean daily minimum °C (°F)	−5.9 (21.4)	−5.0 (23.0)	−0.6 (30.9)	5.2 (41.4)	10.9 (51.6)	14.9 (58.8)	17.9 (64.2)	17.1 (62.8)	12.4 (54.3)	6.3 (43.3)	1.5 (34.7)	−3.0 (26.6)	6.0 (42.8)
Average precipitation mm (inches)	24 (0.9)	26 (1.0)	27 (1.1)	43 (1.7)	73 (2.9)	88 (3.5)	68 (2.7)	54 (2.1)	44 (1.7)	35 (1.4)	32 (1.3)	26 (1.0)	540 (21.3)
Source: Climate-Data.org

== Notable people ==
- Mamed Aghaev, Chechen-Armenian freestyle wrestler and European silver medalist
- Ruslan Gelayev, Chechen military commander and prominent military figure of the Chechen resistance against Russia
- Muslim Tulshaev, Chechen-German professional mixed martial artist

== Administrative and municipal status ==
Within the framework of administrative divisions, Urus-Martan serves as the administrative center of Urus-Martanovsky District. As an administrative division, it is incorporated within Urus-Martanovsky District as Urus-Martan Town Administration. As a municipal division, Urus-Martan Town Administration is incorporated within Urus-Martanovsky Municipal District as Urus-Martanovskoye Urban Settlement.
