= Aukh =

Historical region in the current republic of Dagestan

Aukh Ӏовх / Ӏавх
- Former subdivision of Russia
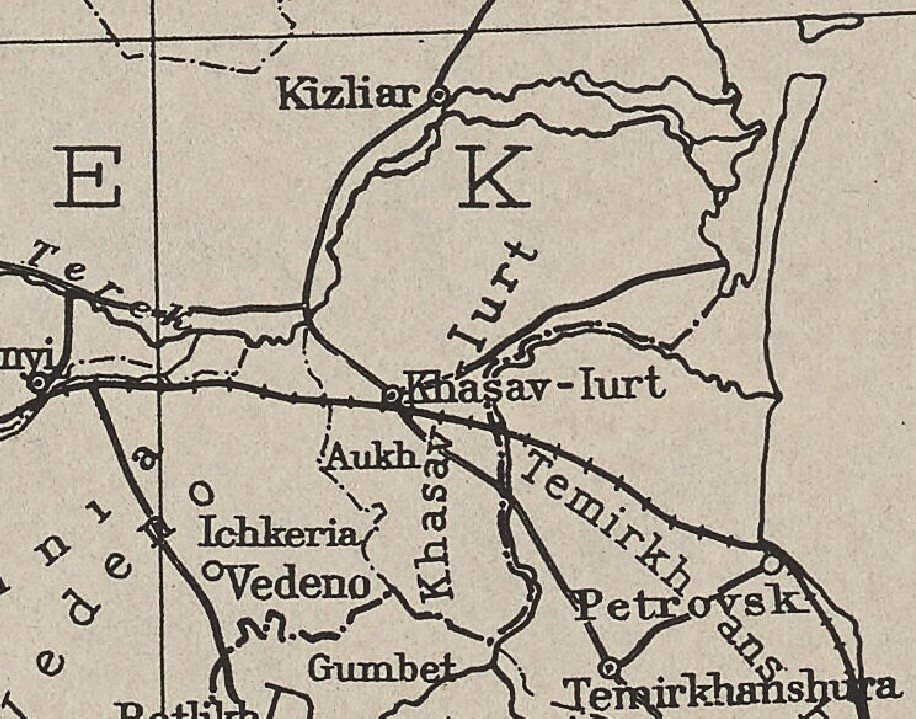
- Historical era: Chechnya
  - Established: In 1921, it was transferred to the Dagestan ASSR.
- Today part of: Russia · Dagestan

Aukh (Chechen: Ӏовх, Ӏавх, 'Ovkh, Ӏовхойн мохк; Russian: Ау́х) is a historical region in the current republic of Dagestan, populated by Chechens. Aukh encompasses parts of the Novolak, Khasavyurtovsky, Babayurtovsky and Kazbekovsky districts. The Chechens of Dagestan call themselves Aukhs (ӏовхой), and speak the Aukh dialect of the Chechen language.

== Historical inhabitants of Aukh ==
The territories where the Nakh clans settled were inhabited in ancient times by the Vainakh tribe "Авхар". Therefore, the modern teips were not the first Chechens to master these lands.

Aukh has historically been inhabited by Chechen tribes and were mentioned by several sources of the time as Okoki, Gueni, and others. Aukh was transferred to Dagestan in 1921. Aukh was very mixed with a lot of different Chechen and Ingush teips from all areas of Chechnya and Ingushetia, due to this the tribes living there had several different names in Russian sources.

== History ==
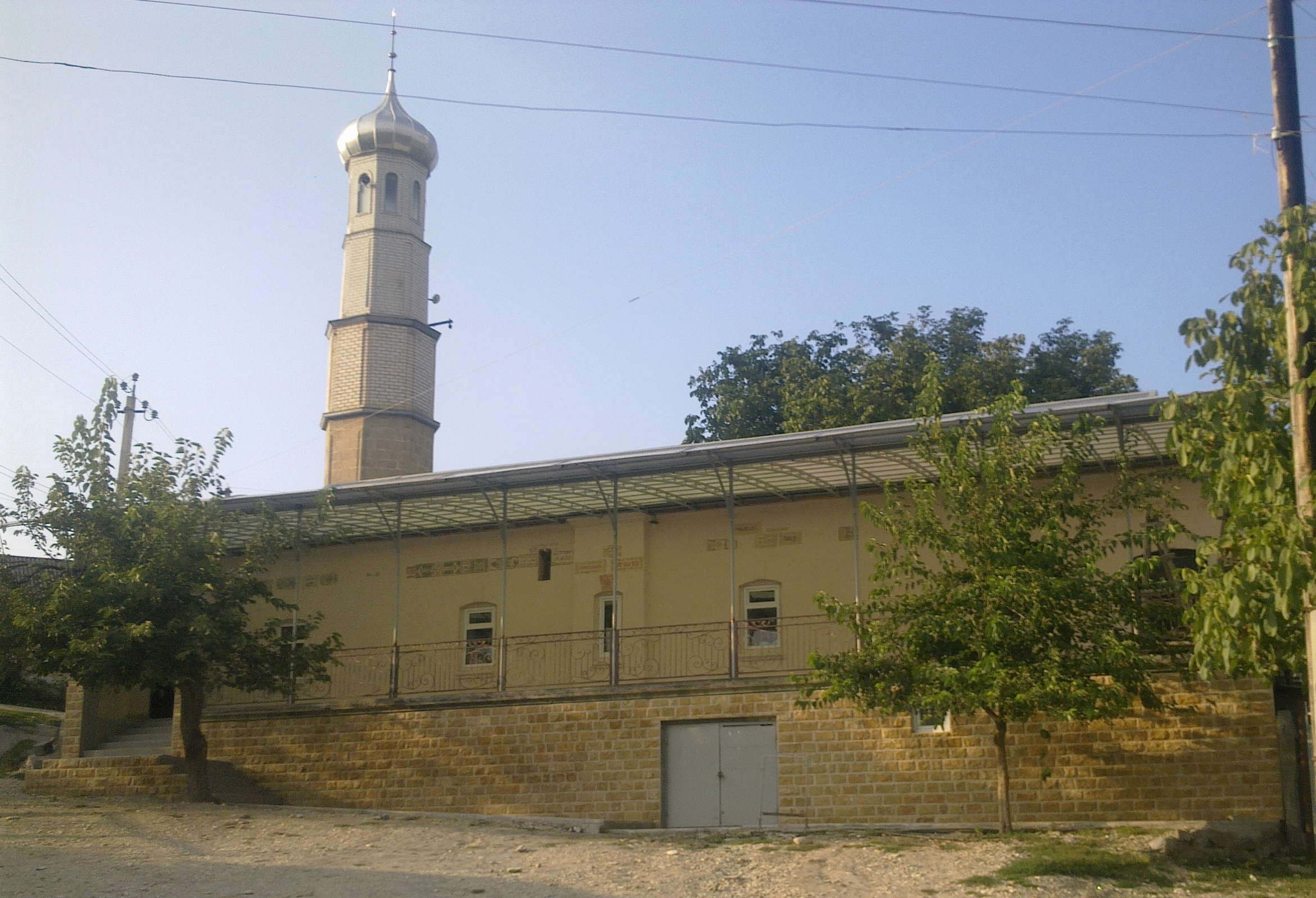
20th century "Mosque in Yurt-Aukh" in the village of Yurt-Aukh

=== Okotsk Lands ===
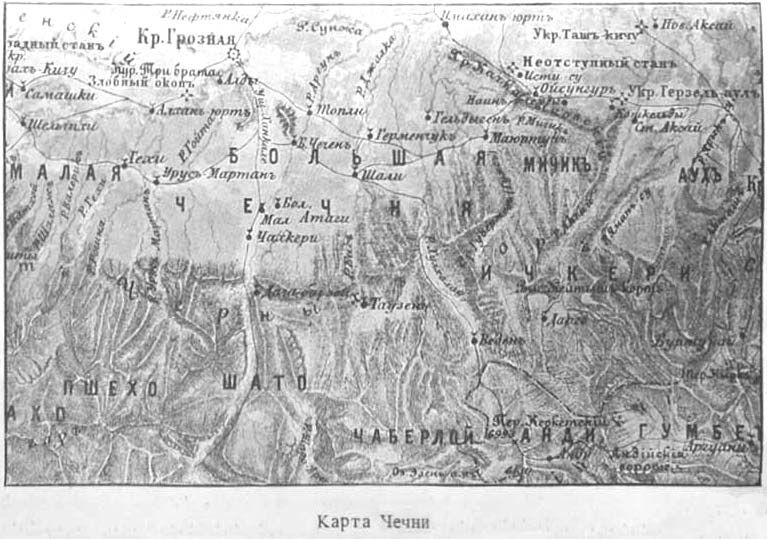
Aukh in the upper right

(Russian: Окоцкая земля) is an Old Russian term used by the Russian Tsardom to denote a Chechen feudal entity, which they encountered in the 16th century. Okotsk was one of the important allies of Russia in the North Caucasus, and had a rivalry with the other polities of Dagestan, particularly the Kumyk controlled Shamkalate of Tarki. It distinguished itself by being in opposition to Persian, Ottoman and Crimean hegemony over the North Caucasus, allying itself with the Russian Tsardom instead. The Prince Shikh Okotsky commanded at some point a host of 500 Cossacks and 500 Chechens (Aukhs), although the 500 Aukhs were part of a larger immobilized Chechen force of 1,000 infantry and 100 mounted cavalry. In the year 1583 Shikh Murza's joint Chechen-Cossack force would attack an Ottoman force traveling from Derbent to the Sea of Azov to the aid of the Crimean Khanate, the Ottoman force took significant damage which hampered their transit from Derbent to the Sea of Azov.

=== Aukh Naibstvo ===
Aukh district, 1943, note: the district included only a fraction of historical Aukh

In the 19th century, Aukh was incorporated into the Caucasian Imamate as one of many Chechen Naibstvos (Administrative unit of the Caucasian Imamate). In 1843 the Aukh Naib district was one of the most important Naibstva, it had up to 1,500 families and could equally supply 1,500 soldiers to the Caucasian Imamate. In another report from 1857 Aukh under Naib Hatu had in total 530 warriors of which 200 were cavalry and 330 infantry. Another famous Naib of Aukh was Bashir-Sheikh from Endirey who belonged to the famous Chechen-Kumyk nobility called Sala-Uzden.

=== Administrative Dispute ===
In 1921, Aukh was included in the Dagestan ASSR, despite the desire of Aukhs to join the Chechen-Ingush Autonomous Soviet Socialist Republic. According to another explanation, the reason was the entering Aukhovites fear of losing their winter pastures in the territory of the Khasavyurtovsky District. In 1943, the territory was incorporated into the Aukh district, which only lasted til February 1944, when Aukhs were ethnically cleansed from their homeland along with the rest of the Chechen nation. Part of Aukh was incorporated into the new Novolaksy district and the property and houses of the ethnically cleansed Chechens, were given to Laks free of charge. The villages Shircha-Aukh (Kalininaul) and Aukh-Aktash (Leninaul) were transferred to the Kazbekovski District and the property there was given to Avars. In 1956, Chechens began to return to their historical homeland, widespread ethnic conflict ensued.

== Ethnic cleansing ==
In the south is the homeland of the Laks, further north is the part of Aukh they were given to settle by DASSR, hence the name Novolak district, New Lak district.

With the permission of the authorities of the Soviet Dagestan, on October 5, 1943, the Aukhs formed their national Aukhs district (the territory of the modern Novolaksky and part of the Kazbekovsky regions) with the center in Yaryksu-Aukh (modern Novokuli). But at the end of February 1944, the Aukhs, sharing a similar fate with other Vainakhs, were ethnically cleansed from their homeland. The authorities disbanded the Aukh district, giving the land of Aukhs to other ethnic groups of Dagestan.

In the period from 1957 to 1960, the majority of Aukhs returned to the Soviet Dagestan, however, the leadership of the republic forbade them to resettle the land of their ancestors, especially in the Novolaksky and Kazbekovsky districts (only a few successfully repatriated). Due to restrictions, Aukhs began to settle in other settlements of the republic, which the authorities indicated to them (legislatively, this ban was enacted by a resolution of the Council of Ministers of the DASSR on July 16, 1958). Until 1961, Aukhs fought for their return to their native places of residence after which under the threat of a new ethnic cleansing, they had to temporarily abandon their claims.

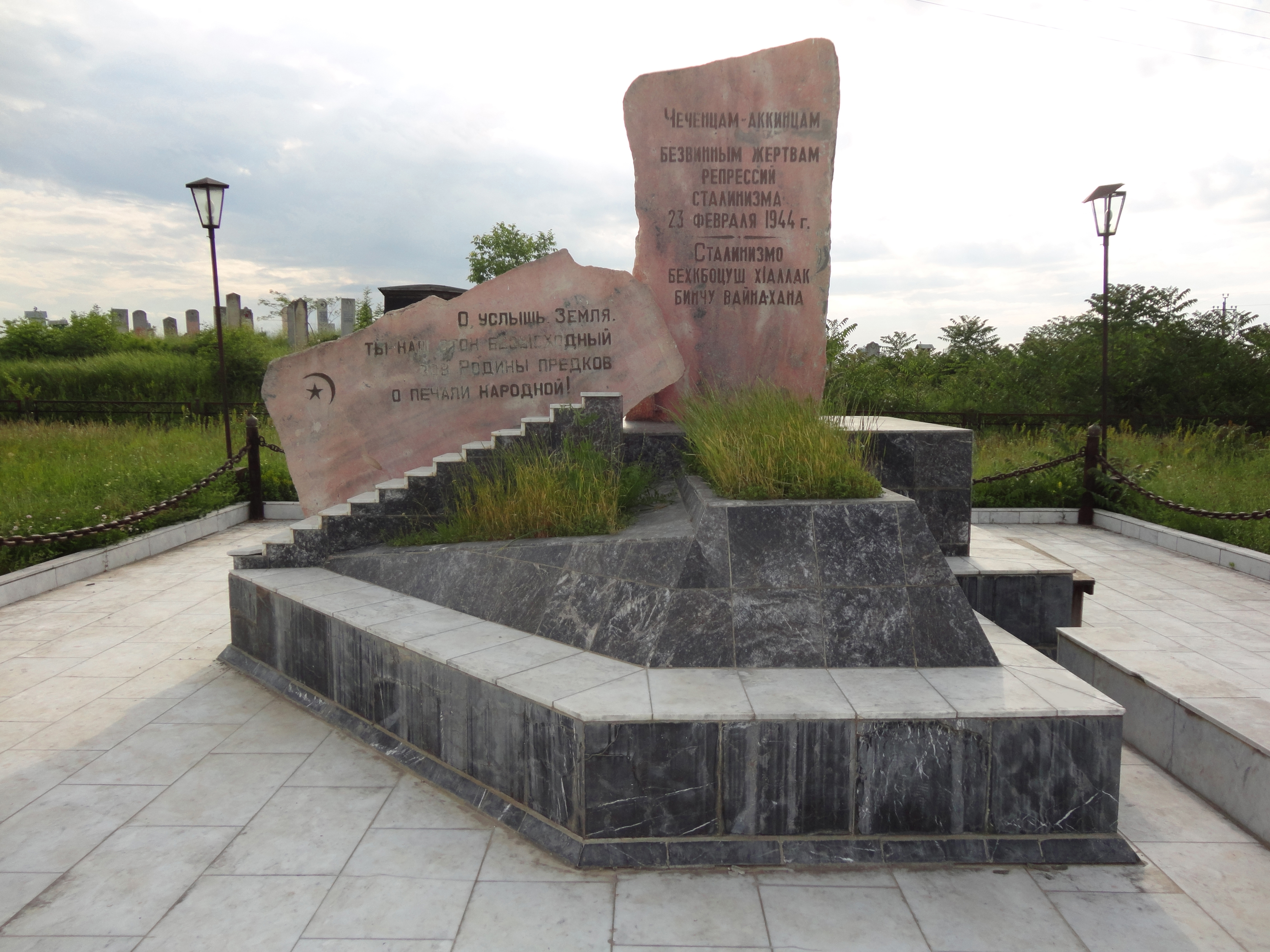
Monument in honor of the Chechen-Aukhs that were affected by Aardakh.

Aukhs never abandoned attempts to return their former dwellings occupied by Avars and Laks. The resulting interethnic tension led to clashes, sometimes with tragic consequences. In 1964, Aukhs made another attempt to return to their native homeland, acting in an organized manner and emphasizing the peaceful nature of their action. The leadership of the Soviet Dagestan was confused and declared these actions “riots”, although no repressive measures were taken against the participants in the events then. Once again, Aukhs tried to return to their homes in 1976 and 1985 in the village of Chapaevo (Chech. Keshen-Evla), and in 1989 in many native Aukh villages. In response to these actions, the local party leadership began to turn the Avars and Laks against the Aukhs. On July 3, 1989, a rally was organized demanding the renewed cleansing of Aukhs from Dagestan.

== Chechen villages in Aukh ==
Taip (clan)		Subdialect	The family village
Akkoy	Ӏаккой	South Aukh.	Shircha-Aukh
Barchkhoy	Барчхой	North -Aukh.	Barchkhoy-Otar
Biytaroy	Бийтарой	South Aukh.	Shircha-Aukh
Biltoy	Билтой	North -Aukh., Plain Aukh.	Built-Aukh
Bonoy	Боной	North -Aukh.	Boni-Yurt
Wappiy	Ваьппий	South Aukh.	Shircha-Aukh
Guloy	ГӀулой	North -Aukh.	
Jey (Jevoy)	Жей (Жевой)	South Aukh.	Pkharchkhoshka
Zandakoy	Зандакъой	North -Aukh., Plain Aukh.	Mini-Atagi
Zogoy	ЗогӀой	North -Aukh.	Boni-Aukh
Kovstoy	Къавстой (Къовстой)	North -Aukh.	Keshen-Aukh
Kevoy	Кевой	North -Aukh.	
Kurchaloy	Курчалой	North -Aukh.	
Kkharkhoy	Кхархой	North -Aukh., South Aukh.	
Merjoy	Мержой	North -Aukh.	Pkharchkhoshka
Nokkhoy	Ноккхой	North -Aukh., South Aukh.	
Ovrshoy	Овршой	North -Aukh.	
Peshkhoy	Пешхой	North -Aukh.	
Pkharchkhoy	Пхьарчхой	South Aukh.	Pkharchkhoshka
Saloy	Салой	North -Aukh.	
Contaroy	ЦӀонтарой	North -Aukh., Plain Aukh.	
Cechoy	ЦӀечой	North -Aukh.	
Chantiy	ЧӀаьнтий	North -Aukh., North -Aukh.	
Chontoy	Чонтой	South Aukh.	
Chungaroy	Чунгарой	North -Aukh.	
Chkharoy	Чхьарой	North -Aukh.	
Shinroy	Шинрой	North -Aukh., North -Aukh.	

== Notable Chechens from Aukh ==
- Baybulatov, Irbaykhan — senior lieutenant and battalion commander of the Soviet Union during WW2, awarded the title Hero of the Soviet Union posthumously
- Beterbiev, Artur — current unified light-heavyweight boxing champion.
- Nuradilov, Khanpasha — Soviet machine gunner, Hero of the Soviet Union recipient
- Otarsultanov, Dzhamal — Olympic wrestler, won the gold medal in men's freestyle 55 kg at the 2012 London Olympics
- Saitiev, Adam — freestyle wrestler, multiple World and European champion and winner for gold at the 2000 Summer Olympics at 85 kg cat.
- Saitiev, Buvaisar — widely considered the greatest freestyle wrestler of all time, deputy in the State Duma representing Dagestan.
- Saritov, Albert — Olympic wrestler, 2016 Olympics bronze medalist.
- Şahin, Ramazan — Olympic wrestler, 2008 Olympics gold medalist.
- Zhabrailov, Elmadi — Olympic wrestler, 1992 Olympics silver medalist.
- Zhabrailov, Alikhan — Freestyle wrestler, 2021 European Wrestling Championships gold medalist.
- Zhamalov, Razambek — Olympic wrestler, 2024 Olympics gold medalist.

== Gallery ==
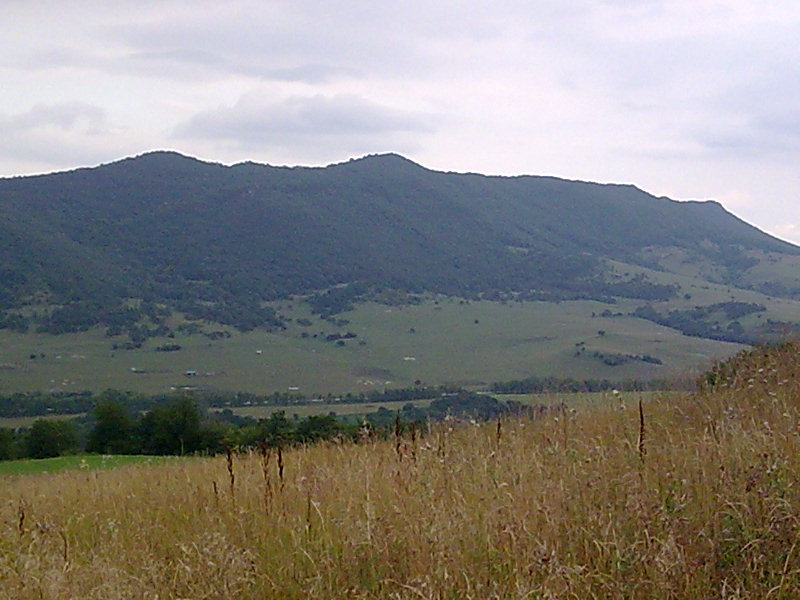

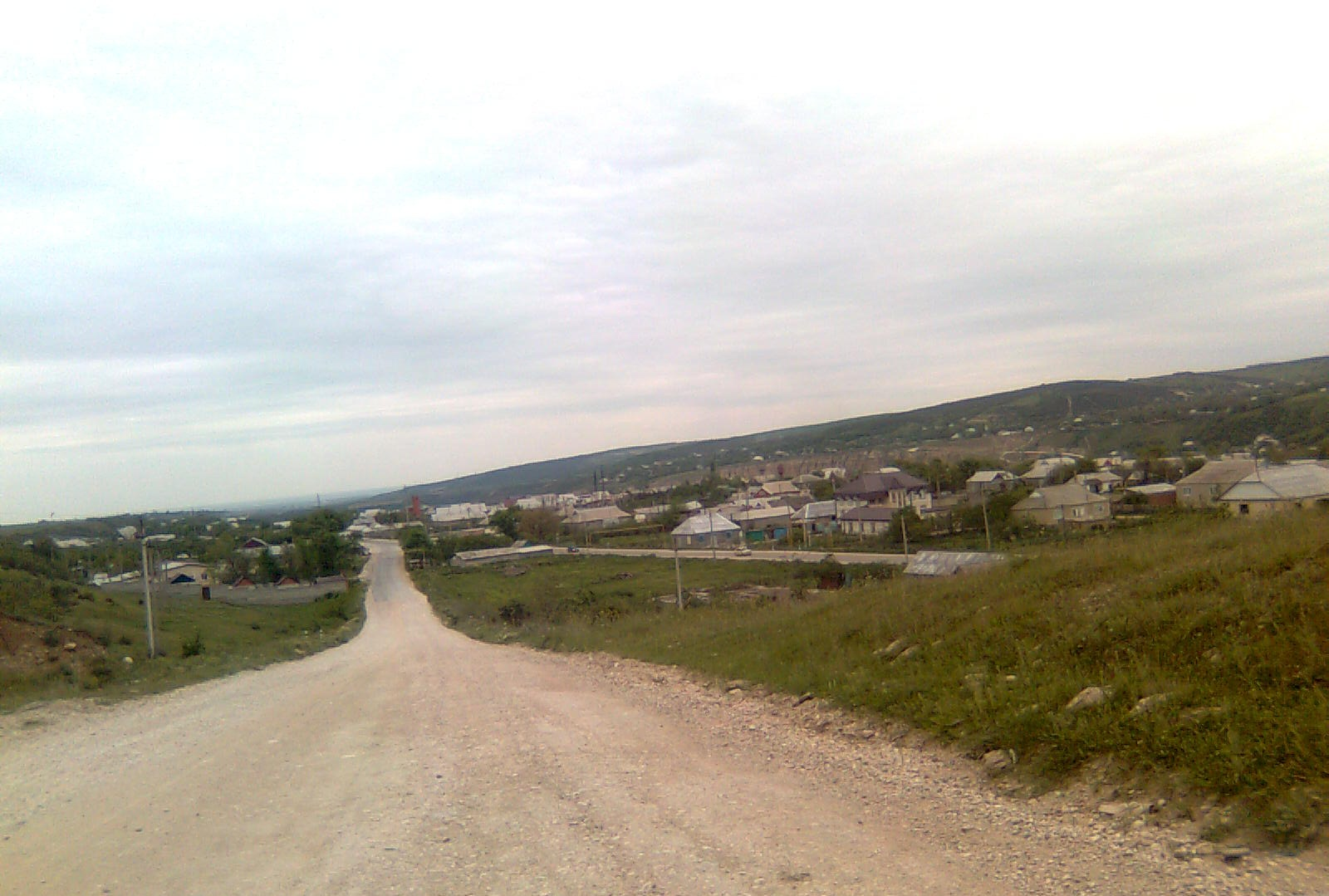

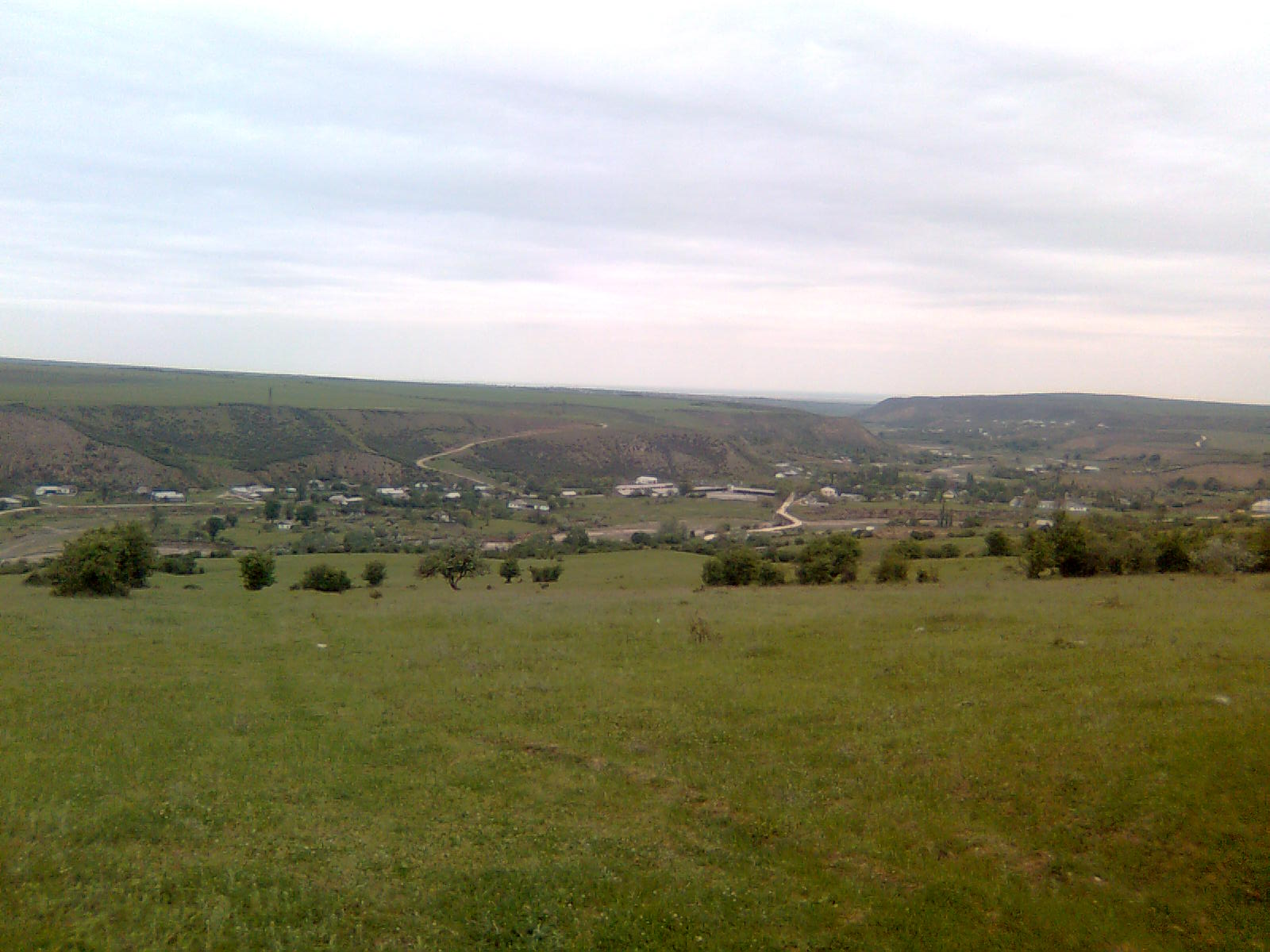

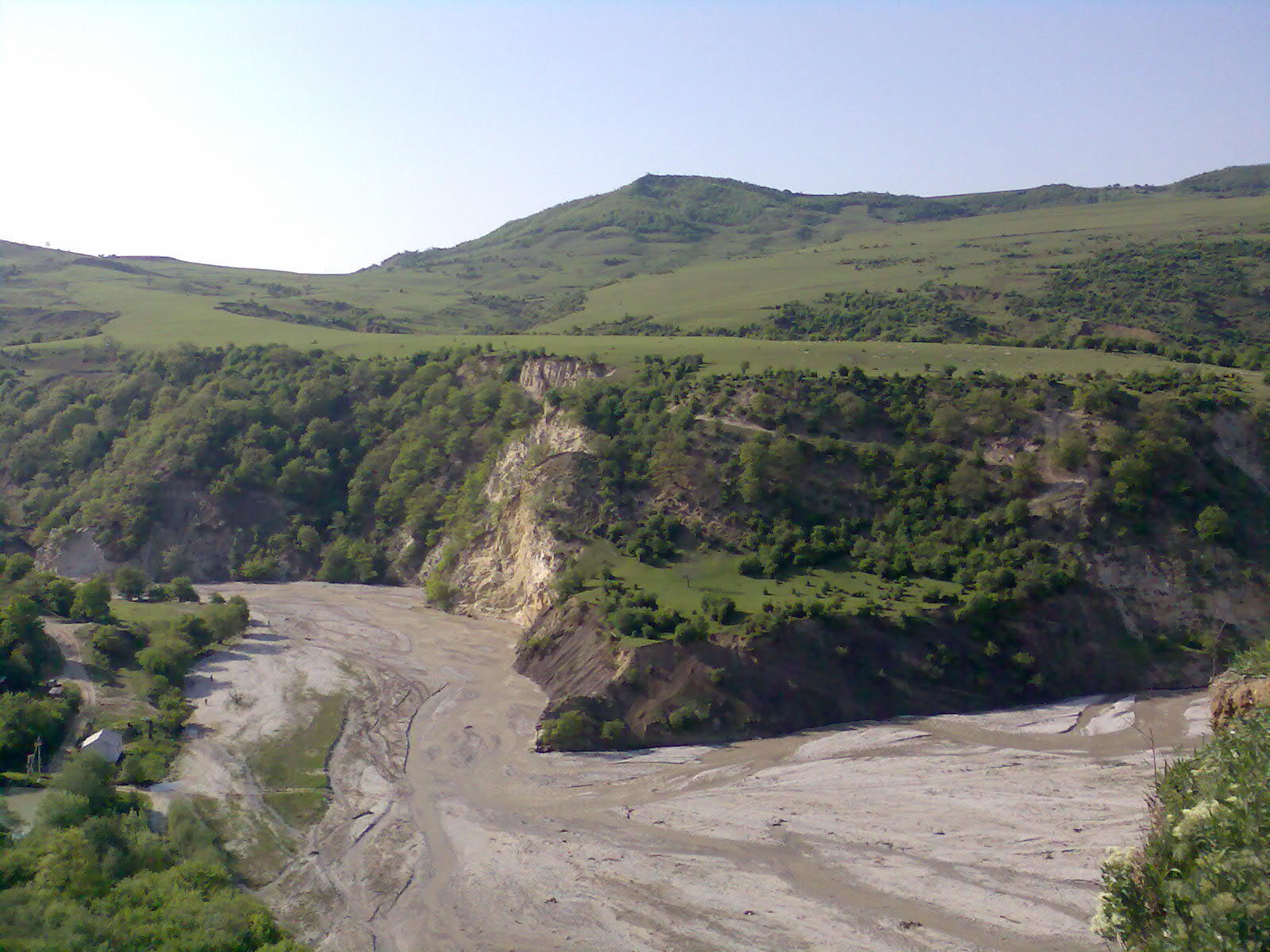

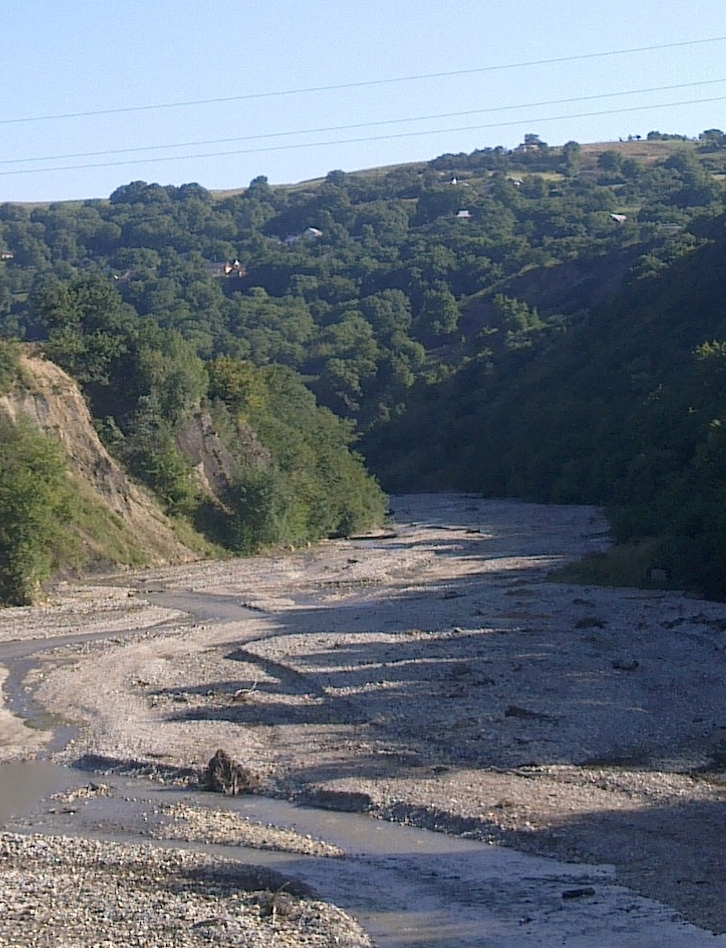

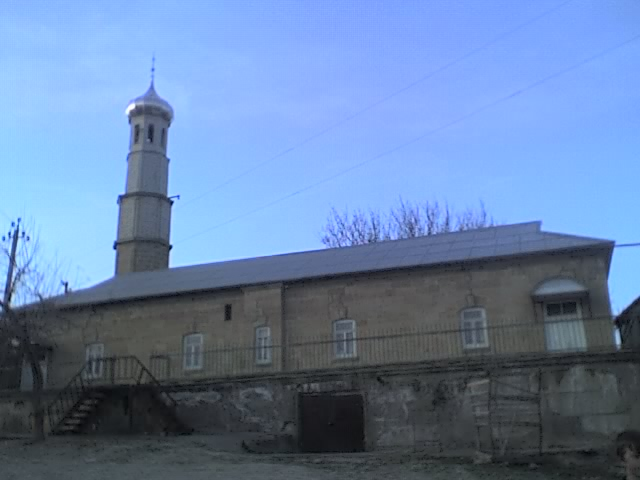

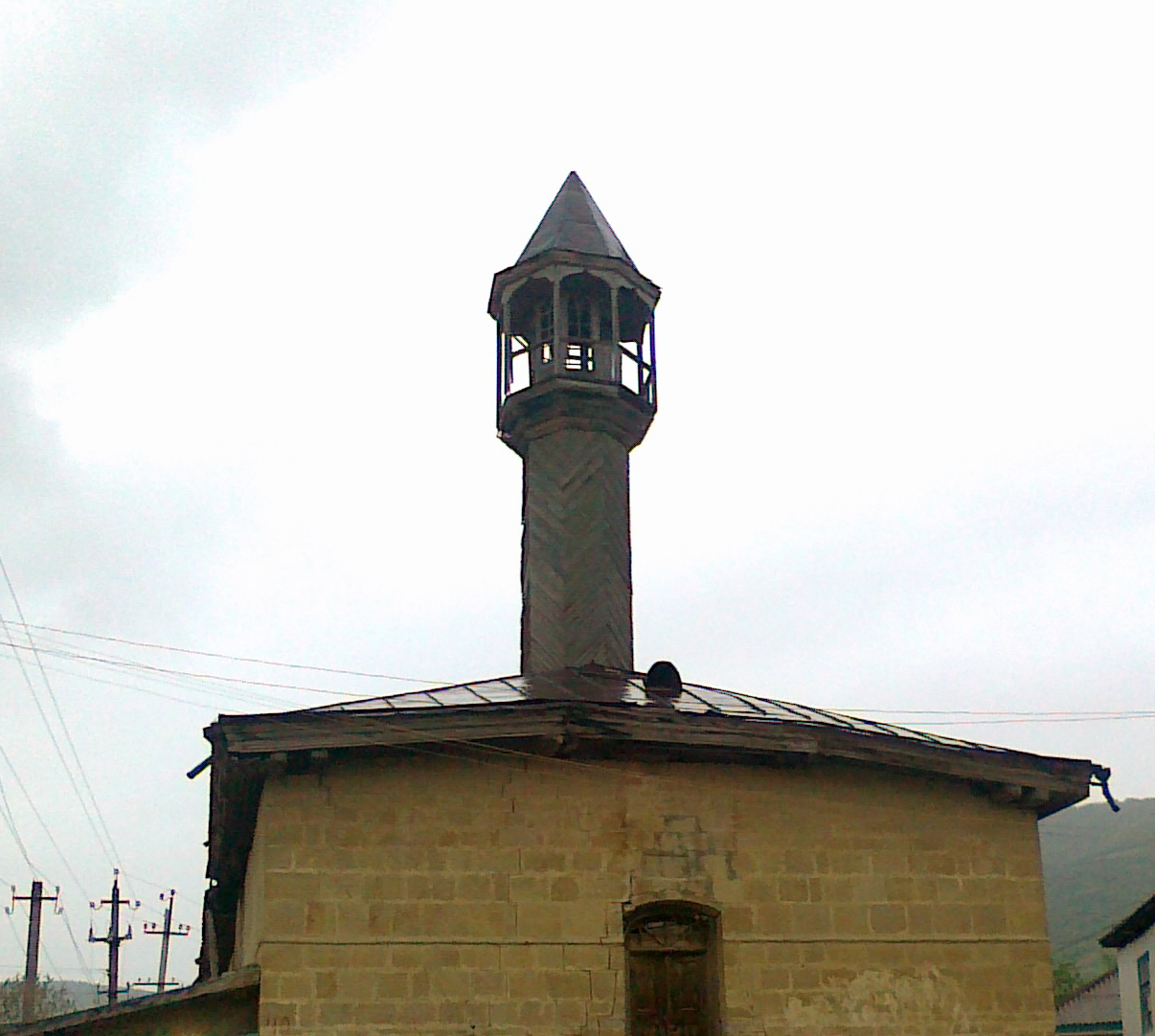

== Bibliography ==
- Ибрагимов, Х. И.; Тишков, В. А.; Осмаев, А. Д.; Устинова, М. Я., eds. (2006). Чеченская Республика и чеченцы: история и современность [Chechen Republic and Chechens: history and modernity] (in Russian). М.: Наука. pp. 1–575. ISBN 5-02-034016-2.
