= Aukh dialect =

Dialect of Chechen

- Ӏовхойн диалект
- Native to: Russia
- Region: Dagestan, Aukh
- Ethnicity: Chechens (Aukhs)
- Native speakers: 160,000 (2014)
- Language family: Northeast Caucasian: Nakh; Chechen; Aukh dialect
- Dialects: Aukh proper (Bamatyurtov); North Aukh (Keshenkhoyev); South Aukh (Pkharchkhoyev)

Language codes
- ISO 639-3: –
- Glottolog: None
- Ethnographic map of the Dagestan Autonomous Soviet Socialist Republic, with Aukhs

The Aukh dialect (Chechen: Ӏовхойн диалект, romanized: 'Ovkhoyn dialekt, Russian: Ауховский диалект, romanized: Aukhovskiy dialekt) is a dialect of the Chechen language. It is primarily spoken by residents of northern Dagestan, and the estimated number of speakers is about 160,000. It is the native dialect of the Aukh society. Linguist Yuri Koryakov considers Aukh to be on par with Ingush and Chechen in the Vainakh language group.

== Subdialects ==
- Aukh proper subdialect
- North Aukh subdialect
- South Aukh subdialect

=== Teips and subdialects ===
| Teip (clan) | | Subdialect | Ancestral village |
| Akkoy | Ӏаккой | South Aukh | Shircha-Aukh |
| Barchkhoy | Барчхой | North Aukh | Barchkhoy-Otar |
| Biytaroy | Бийтарой | South Aukh | Shircha-Aukh |
| Biltoy | Билтой | North Aukh, Aukh proper | Built-Aukh |
| Bonoy | Боной | North Aukh | Booni-Yurt |
| Wappiy | Ваьппий | South Aukh | Shircha-Aukh |
| Guloy | ГӀулой | North Aukh | |
| Jey (Jevoy) | Жей (Жевой) | South Aukh | Pkharchkhoshka |
| Zandakoy | Зандакъой | North Aukh, Aukh proper | Mini-Atagi |
| Zogoy | ЗогӀой | North Aukh | Boni-Aukh |
| Kovstoy | Къавстой (Къовстой) | North Aukh | Keshen-Aukh |
| Kevoy | Кевой | North Aukh | |
| Kurchaloy | Курчалой | North Aukh, Aukh proper | |
| Kkharkhoy | Кхархой | North Aukh, South Aukh | |
| Merjoy | Мержой | North Aukh | Pkharchkhoshka |
| Nokkhoy | Ноккхой | North Aukh, South Aukh | |
| Ovrshoy | Овршой | North Aukh | |
| Peshkhoy | Пешхой | North Aukh | |
| Pkharchkhoy | Пхьарчхой | South Aukh | Pkharchkhoshka |
| Saloy | Салой | North Aukh | |
| Contaroy | ЦӀонтарой | North Aukh, Aukh proper | |
| Cechoy | ЦӀечой | North Aukh | |
| Chantiy | ЧӀаьнтий | North Aukh, South Aukh | |
| Chontoy | Чонтой | South Aukh | |
| Chungaroy | Чунгарой | North Aukh | |
| Chkharoy | Чхьарой | North Aukh | |
| Shinroy | Шинрой | North Aukh, South Aukh | |

== Phonology ==
In the Aukh dialect, similar to the Chechen language, there is an absence of words with the voiceless fricative consonant [f] which is more common in Ingush. Additionally, both the Aukh dialect and the Chechen literary language exhibit vowel nasalization, particularly at the end of words, unlike Ingush. The vowel system of the Aukh dialect closely resembles that of the Chechen literary language.

Transitional between it and Ingush, the Aukh dialect is similar to the Chechen dialect in that in its verb forms, as in Chechen, the vowels [ø] ⟨оь⟩ and [y] ⟨уь⟩ are widespread, while in Ingush they are very rare. According to Professor I. Arsakhanov, "The Aukh dialect, although it occupies an intermediate position between the Chechen and Ingush languages, still gravitates to the Chechen language".

== Bibliography ==
- Аккинский диалект в системе чечено-ингушского языка. 1959. pp. /180. (заглавие книги, указанное на обложке и на титульном листе — «Аккинский диалект в системе чечено-ингушского языка», а в выпускных данных — «Аккинский диалект в системе чечено-ингушских языков»)
- Чеченская диалектология. 1969. pp. /211.
- Проблема лексического состава диалектов и разработка диалектных словарей иберийско-кавказских языков: материалы X региональной научной сессии по историко-сравнительному изучению иберийско-кавказских языков. 1987.
- Закономерности развития и взаимодействия языков в советском обществе. Наука. 1966.
- Malsagov, Z. K. (1936). "Очерк Аккинского (Ауховского) языка" [Essay on the Akkin (Aukh) language]. In Arsanov, S.; Mamakaev, M.; Avtorkhanov, A. (eds.). Известия Чечено-Ингушского научно-исследовательского института [Bulletin of the Chechen-Ingush Research Institute] (in Russian). Grozny: ChINII. pp. 72–90.
- Умхаев, Хамзат (2012). В поисках национальной идентичности. FGUP "IPK "Groznenskiĭ rabochiĭ". ISBN 978-5-4314-0055-1.
- Арсаханов И. А. под ред. Х. Ошаева, ред. Ф. М. Колесников (ed.). Аккинский диалект в системе чечено-ингушского языка. Грозный: Чечено-Ингушское кн. изд-во. pp. /180.
