= Yamansu =

Yamansu Ямансу Лакха-Отар
- Selo
- Location within Republic of Dagestan Location within Russia
- Coordinates: 43°08′N 46°25′E
- Country: Russia
- Region: Republic of Dagestan
- District: Novolaksky District
- Time zone: UTC+3:00

Yamansu (Russian: Ямансу; Chechen: Лакха-Отар, Laqa-Otar) is a rural locality (a selo) in Novolaksky District, Republic of Dagestan, Russia. The population was 781 as of 2010. There are 15 streets.

== Geography ==
Yamansu is located 21 km southwest of Khasavyurt and 7 km northwest of Novolakskoye (the district's administrative centre) by road, on the Yamansu River. Banayurt and Balansu are the nearest rural localities.

== Nationalities ==
Chechens live there.
