= Novochurtakh =

Novochurtakh Новочуртах Алтмирз-Йурт
- Selo
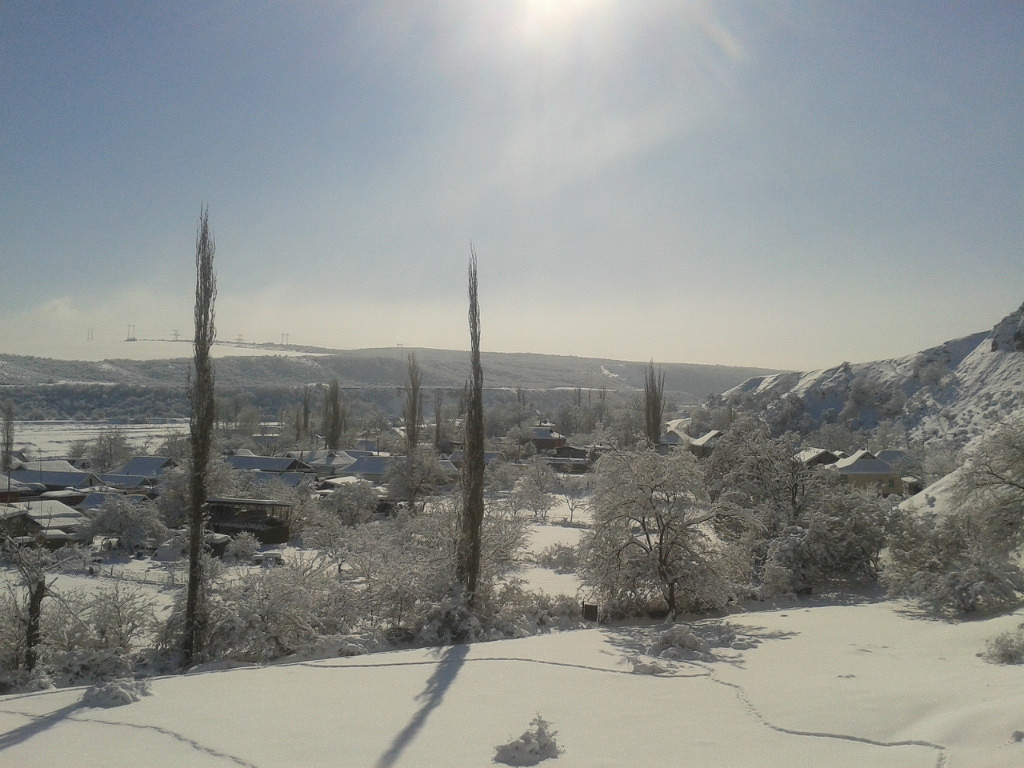
- Winter in the village of Altmarzayurt (Alty-Mirza-Yurt)

- Location within Republic of Dagestan Location within Russia
- Coordinates: 43°12′N 46°32′E
- Country: Russia
- Region: Republic of Dagestan
- District: Novolaksky District
- Time zone: UTC+3:00

Novochurtakh (Russian: Новочуртах; Chechen: Алтмирз-Йурт, Altmirz-Yurt) is a rural locality (a selo) in Novolaksky District, Republic of Dagestan, Russia. The population was 3,305 as of 2010. There are 42 streets.

== Geography ==
Novochurtakh is located 9 km south of Khasavyurt, on the left bank of the Yaryk-su River. Gamiyakh and Arkabash are the nearest rural localities.

== Nationalities ==
Chechens, Avars and Laks live there.
