= Charavali =

Charavali Чаравали Чаравалу
- Selo
- Location within Republic of Dagestan Location within Russia
- Coordinates: 43°09′N 46°30′E
- Country: Russia
- Region: Republic of Dagestan
- District: Novolaksky District
- Time zone: UTC+3:00

Charavali (Russian: Чаравали; Lak: Чаравалу) is a rural locality (a selo) in Novokulinsky Selsoviet, Novolaksky District, Republic of Dagestan, Russia. The population was 1,214 as of 2010. There are 6 streets.

== Geography ==
Charavali is located 6 km northeast of Novolakskoye (the district's administrative centre) by road, on the bank of the Yaryk-su River. Novokuli and Zoriotar are the nearest rural localities.

== Nationalities ==
Chechens and Laks live there.
