= Alkhan-Barts =

Mountain in Dagestan, Russia

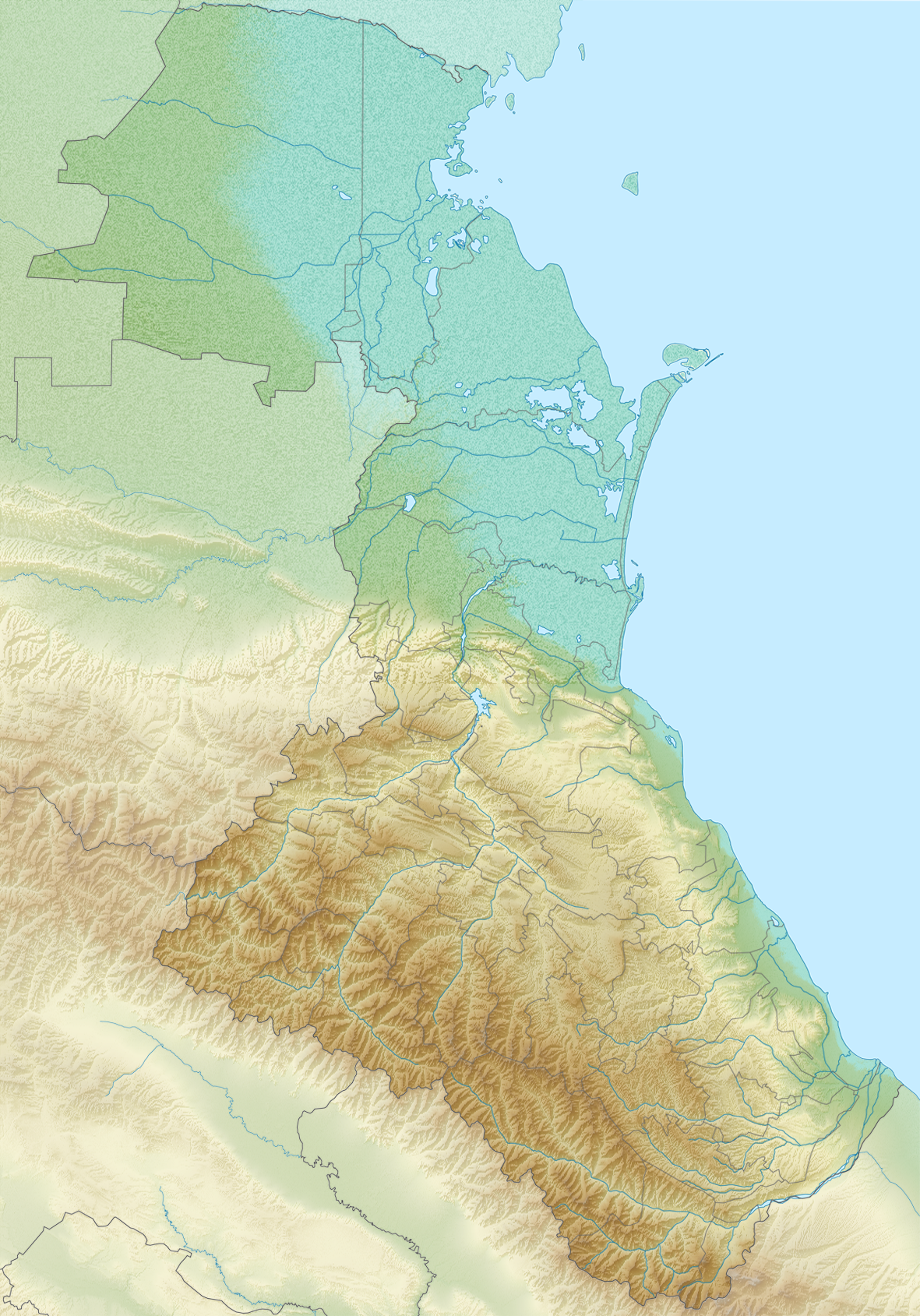
- Location within Republic of Dagestan

Highest point
- Elevation: 322 m (1,056 ft)
- Coordinates: 43°15′30″N 46°30′30″E

Geography
- Location: Dagestan

Alkhan-Barts is a mountain in the Novolaksky district of Dagestan. The height above sea level is 323 metres (353 yd). It is characterized by the extreme steepness of the western slopes.

== Geographical position ==
The mountain is located at the junction of Predgornogo Dagestan and Kumyk plain, north of the Saimaash tract (from the Chechen, "Deer horns").

It is located to the south-west of the city of Khasavyurt, between the villages Gamiyah (western slope) and Novochurtakh (eastern slope).

At the western foot of the mountain flows the Yamansu River (the tributary of the Aksai River).
