= Aukhs =

Part of Chechen people

Ethnographic map of the Dagestan Autonomous Soviet Socialist Republic. Aukhs green

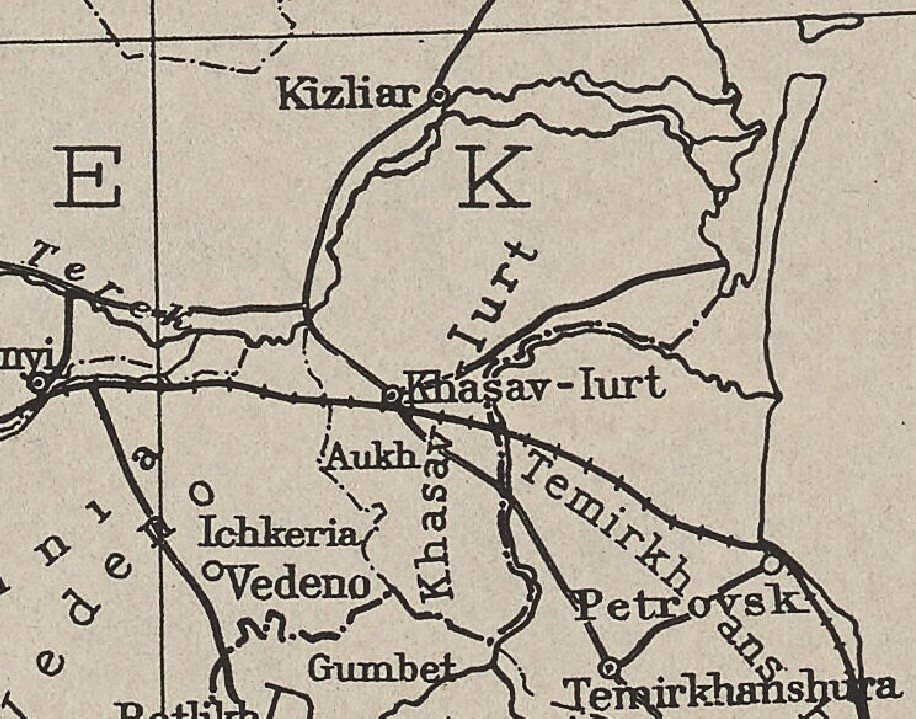
Aukh (American map of the Caucasus 1910).

Aukhs (Chechen: Ӏовхой) are an ethnographic group of Chechens. Aukhs are currently living in the territories of Novolaksky (former Aukh District), Khasavyurtovsky, Babayurtovsky and Kazbekovsky (Western part of the Aukh) areas of modern central Dagestan, along the rivers Yamansu, Yaryksu, Aktash and Aksai (earlier Eastern Chechnya). They speak the Aukh dialect of the Chechen language.

== Modernity ==
Nowadays, the Aukh District has not yet been restored. The leadership of the Republic of Dagestan conducts some actions to solve the problem of Aukhs, the effectiveness of which is evaluated in different ways. For example, today there is a gradual resettlement of Laks from the Novolaksky district closer to Makhachkala in Novostroy and the return of Aukhs to their former villages. On October 18, 2000, by the Decree of the State Council of the Republic of Dagestan No. 191, the Chechens-Aukhs were attributed to the indigenous peoples of the Republic of Dagestan.

== Clans (teips) ==
Aukhovsky Society includes the following clans (teips):

- Akkoy (Chechen: Ӏаккой),
- Barchkhoy (Chechen: Барчхой),
- Biytaroy (Chechen: Бийтарой),
- Biltoy (Chechen: Билтой),
- Bonoy (Chechen: Боной),
- Vappiy (Chechen: Ваьппий),
- Guloy (Chechen: ГӀулой),
- Djey (Chechen: Жей (Жевой)),
- Zandakoy (Chechen: Зандакъой),
- Zogoy (Chechen: ЗӀогой),
- Kevoy (Chechen: Кевой),
- Karkhoy (Chechen: Кхархой),
- Kostoy (Chechen: Къовстой/Къавстой),
- Merjoy (Chechen: Мержой),
- Nokkhoy (Chechen: Ноккхой),
- Ovrshoy (Chechen: Овршой),
- Peshkhoy (Chechen: Пешхой),
- Pkharchkhoy (Chechen: Пхьарчхой),
- Saloy (Chechen: Салой),
- Cechoy (Chechen: ЦӀечой),
- Contaroy (Chechen: ЦӀонтарой),
- Chontoy (Chechen: Чонтой),
- Chungaroy (Chechen: Чунгарой),
- Chantiy (Chechen: ЧӀаьнтий),
- Chkharoy (Chechen: Чхьарой),
- Shinroy (Chechen: Шинрой).
