= Barchkhoyotar =

Barchkhoyotar Барчхойотар Барчхой
- Selo
- Location within Republic of Dagestan Location within Russia
- Coordinates: 43°09′N 46°28′E
- Country: Russia
- Region: Republic of Dagestan
- District: Novolaksky District
- Time zone: UTC+3:00

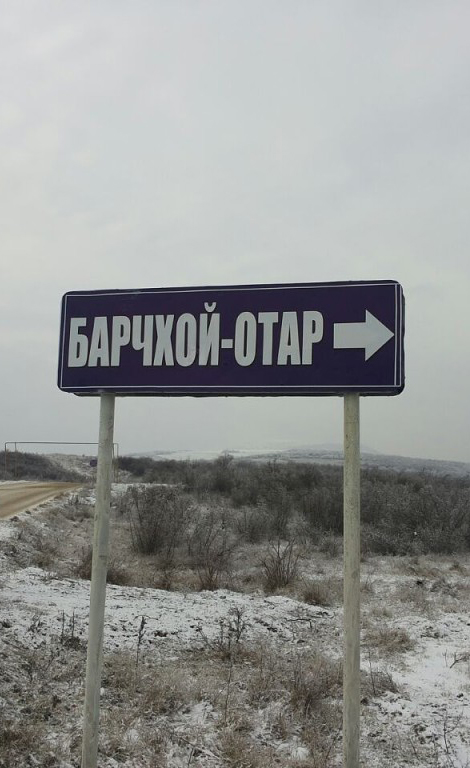
A sign for Barchkhoyotar

Barchkhoyotar (Russian: Барчхойотар; Chechen: Барчхой, Barçxoy) is a rural locality (a selo) in Barchkhoyotarsky Selsoviet, Novolaksky District, Republic of Dagestan, Russia. The population was 451 as of 2010. There are 4 streets.

== Geography ==
Barchkhoyotar is located 8 km north of Novolakskoye (the district's administrative centre) by road, on the bank of the Yamansu River. Zoriotar and Charavali are the nearest rural localities.

== Nationalities ==
Chechens live there.
