= Tukhchar massacre =

Massacre of Russian servicemen by Chechen militants

- Part of the War in Dagestan
Date	5 September 1999
Location	Tukhchar, Novolaksky District, Dagestan, Russia 43°13′18″N 46°24′45″E
Result	Chechen and Dagestani militant victory: Seizure of the village; Destruction of checkpoints; Mass execution of POWs

Belligerents
Islamic International Peacekeeping Brigade	Russia

Commanders and leaders
Umar Edilsultanov	(Russia) Sr. Lt. Vasily Tashkin (POW) (executed)

Units involved
Unknown	Russian Internal Troops: 22nd Spetsnaz Operational Brigade; Dagestani militsiya Dagestani volunteers

Strength
40–200 militants	13 interior troops 18 militsiya officers Several volunteers 1 BMP-2

Casualties and losses
At least 6 killed	6 interior troops captured and executed; 1 BMP-2 gunner killed; 2 militsya officers killed; 1 BMP-2 destroyed
- Location within Republic of Dagestan

The Tukhchar massacre (Russian: Тухчарская резня, romanized: Tukhcharskaya reznya) was an incident during the War in Dagestan which was filmed and distributed on tape, in which Russian prisoners of war were executed. Throughout the battle, Russian soldiers reported finding taped executions of Russian officers and men. Some videos were later sold as snuff films and ended up being posted online. One tape created in September 1999 showed six Russian soldiers, who were conscripts, being executed by Chechen and Dagestani militants. Their throats were slashed and then they were beheaded.

== Background ==
On 7 August 1999, Chechen militants leading the Islamic International Peacekeeping Brigade Shamil Basayev, Ibn al-Khattab, Ramzan Akhmadov and Arbi Barayev, invaded the neighboring Russian republic of Dagestan in support of the Shura of Dagestan separatist rebels. Several battles ensued following a border clash with Bagautdin Kebedov, and on 10 August, they announced the birth of the "independent Islamic State of Dagestan" and declared war on "the traitorous Dagestani government" and "Russia's occupation units".

== Battle ==
On 5 September 1999, two units of Chechen militants crossed into Dagestan, seizing the border village of Tukhchar, Novolaksky District. The Chechen commander leading the attack was identified as Umar Edilsultanov (known as Karpinsky Amir, named after the microdistrict of Karpinka in Grozny), a subordinate of Abdul-Malik Mezhidov, commander of the Islamic religious police of Ichkeria.

Attacking very early in the morning, the Chechens found and exchanged fire with 12 Russian conscripts and one officer of the Kalachevsky brigade stationed at a police checkpoint to strengthen border security. Shortly after the fighting began, the Russian operator of the unit's 30 mm BMP-2, Private Konstantin Anisimov, was killed, communication was disrupted, and the Russians ran out of ammunition. Senior Lieutenant Vasily Tashkin ordered a retreat to a second checkpoint. During a lull in the battle, local residents told Russian soldiers that the Chechens had given them half an hour to leave the village. The villagers brought with them civilian clothing so they could smuggle the policemen and soldiers out of town safely. Tashkin refused to retreat any further, and his resolve convinced others to stay as well. When the half hour was up, the Chechen militants began to search for the Russian defenders, who had been hidden by the townspeople. Six of them barricaded themselves in a barn, but the Chechens surrounded it and poured gasoline on the walls, threatening to burn the structure down. The Chechen militants called for the Russians to surrender, claiming that their intent was to obtain leverage for a prisoner exchange.

== Massacre ==
The prisoners were ordered to lie face down on a track outside the village, and Edilsultanov selected five men from his unit to cut the prisoners' throats. The sixth (Alexey Polagaev) was killed by Edilsultanov himself. One of the Russian soldiers, identified as Alexey Lipatov, fled the site, but was shot. The others killed were named as Senior Lieutenant Vasily Tashkin, Vladimir Kaufman, Boris Erdneyev, Alexey Polagaev, and Alexey Paranin. Two Dagestani militsiya officers, Lieutenant Akhmed Davdiev and Sergeant Abdulkasim Magomedov, were killed protecting the soldiers and officers.

== Aftermath ==
The morning following the executions, village head Magomed-Sultan Khasanov sought and received permission from the Chechen militants to retrieve the bodies of the Russian soldiers. The Chechens held the village until 8 September. Survivors Alexey Ivanov and Fyodor Tchernavin escaped execution by remaining in hiding. Ivanov spent two days in an attic, while Tchernavin hid for five days in a basement. It was not until after they were rescued that they learned of their colleagues' deaths. In late September, the soldiers were quietly buried, with their families unaware of the nature of their deaths.

== Investigation ==
In 2000, the film showing the killings was discovered by Russia's security service on sale in Grozny, which sparked an investigation into this as a war crime.

=== Tamerlan Khasaev ===
The first perpetrator of the massacre identified was Tamerlan Khasaev. At the time Khasaev was already in jail for kidnapping a man in December 2001, and by chance a police officer happened to see the tape and recognized Khasaev from the earlier abduction investigation. Khasaev was brought back to Dagestan from a jail in central Russia to face charges for the death of Alexey Lipatov. In an interview with a Russian investigator, Khasaev said he was simply following orders, and while he described the act as "unpleasant", he expressed no remorse.

Khasaev faced a trial before the Dagestan Supreme Court in October 2002. He pleaded guilty only in part, admitting to participating in illegal militant groups, armed rebellion, and illegal possession of firearms. In his defense, he claimed that he did not strike the killing blow since the sight of blood made him feel ill at ease, and he handed the knife to another fighter. The Russian Lipatov then broke and ran, and a militant shot him in the back. Previously facing 8.5 years of imprisonment for the kidnapping charge, Khasaev was sentenced to life in prison. The court declared that he deserved the death penalty, but because of a moratorium on its use, life imprisonment would have to suffice. Khasaev died in prison shortly afterward.

=== Islan Mukaev ===
Police later detained Islan Mukaev (murderer of Vladimir Kaufman), known as a former Chechen militant, for the crimes. Mukaev lived in the Ingush district centre of Ordzhonikidzevskaya. In 2005, he was sentenced to 25 years in prison.

=== Arbi Dandaev ===
Authorities in 2000 identified Arbi Dandaev, accused of executing Vasily Tashkin and Boris Erdneyev. Dandaev evaded capture for eight years but was arrested in Grozny by Chechen police on 3 April 2008. According to the investigation, Dandaev turned himself in, confessed to the crime, and confirmed his testimony when he was taken to the site of the execution. He pleaded not guilty, however, before the Dagestan Supreme Court, saying that he was interrogated under duress and refused to testify. Nevertheless, the court found his previous admission of guilt valid because it was made in the presence of a lawyer and no complaints were filed at the time. The court studied the film of the execution, and noted that the name Arbi was clearly pronounced in the recording. In interviews with the residents of Tukhchar village, one claimed to recognize Dandaev, although the court weighed the eyewitness evidence lightly given the villager's advanced age and uncertainty.

Dandaev's defense also claimed that Dandaev was mentally disturbed, and petitioned the court multiple times to repeat psychiatric evaluations that previously had determined that the defendant was fit to stand trial. The petition claimed that in 1995, Russian soldiers wounded Dandaev's younger brother in Grozny, and after some time in the military hospital the boy's corpse was returned to the family and his internal organs were harvested to fuel the illegal Chechen human organ trafficking trade. According to Dandaev's lawyers, the incident caused intense mental trauma, and the charges against Dandaev were devised to prevent the defendant's father from seeking legal redress for the death of his youngest son. Nonetheless, the court held that Dandaev was sane and that the investigation into his brother's death had no bearing on the case. Dandaev was convicted, and although the prosecutor asked for a sentence of 22 years, the court sentenced Dandaev to life imprisonment in 2009.

=== Mansur Razhaev ===
In 2010, the investigation led to Mansur Razhaev, a 34-year old from Grozny in jail for gang-related crime and robbery. Like Khasaev, he said he was present, but did not strike a killing blow and thus wasn't guilty of murder. During the trial Dandaev testified on behalf of Razhaev. Razhaev was convicted on 31 January 2012 for the execution of Boris Erdneyev and sentenced to life imprisonment.

=== Rizvan Vagapov ===
On 8 August 2011, Rizvan Vagapov was detained by law enforcement agencies in Grozny. He was convicted and sentenced to 18 years imprisonment for his role in the massacre.

== See also ==
- Second Chechen War crimes and terrorism
