= Zoriotar =

Zoriotar Зориотар
- Selo
- Location within Republic of Dagestan Location within Russia
- Coordinates: 43°10′N 46°29′E
- Country: Russia
- Region: Republic of Dagestan
- District: Novolaksky District
- Time zone: UTC+3:00

Zoriotar (Russian: Зориотар) is a rural locality (a selo) and the administrative centre of Barchkhoyotarsky Selsoviet, Novolaksky District, Republic of Dagestan, Russia. The population was 1,104 as of 2010. There are 5 streets.

== Geography ==
Zoriotar is located 16 km southwest of Khasavyurt, on the bank of the Yamansu River. Charavali and Barchkhoyotar are the nearest rural localities.

== Nationalities ==
Chechens and Laks live there.
