= Chapayevo, Republic of Dagestan =

Chapayevo Чапаево Кешен-Эвла
- Selo
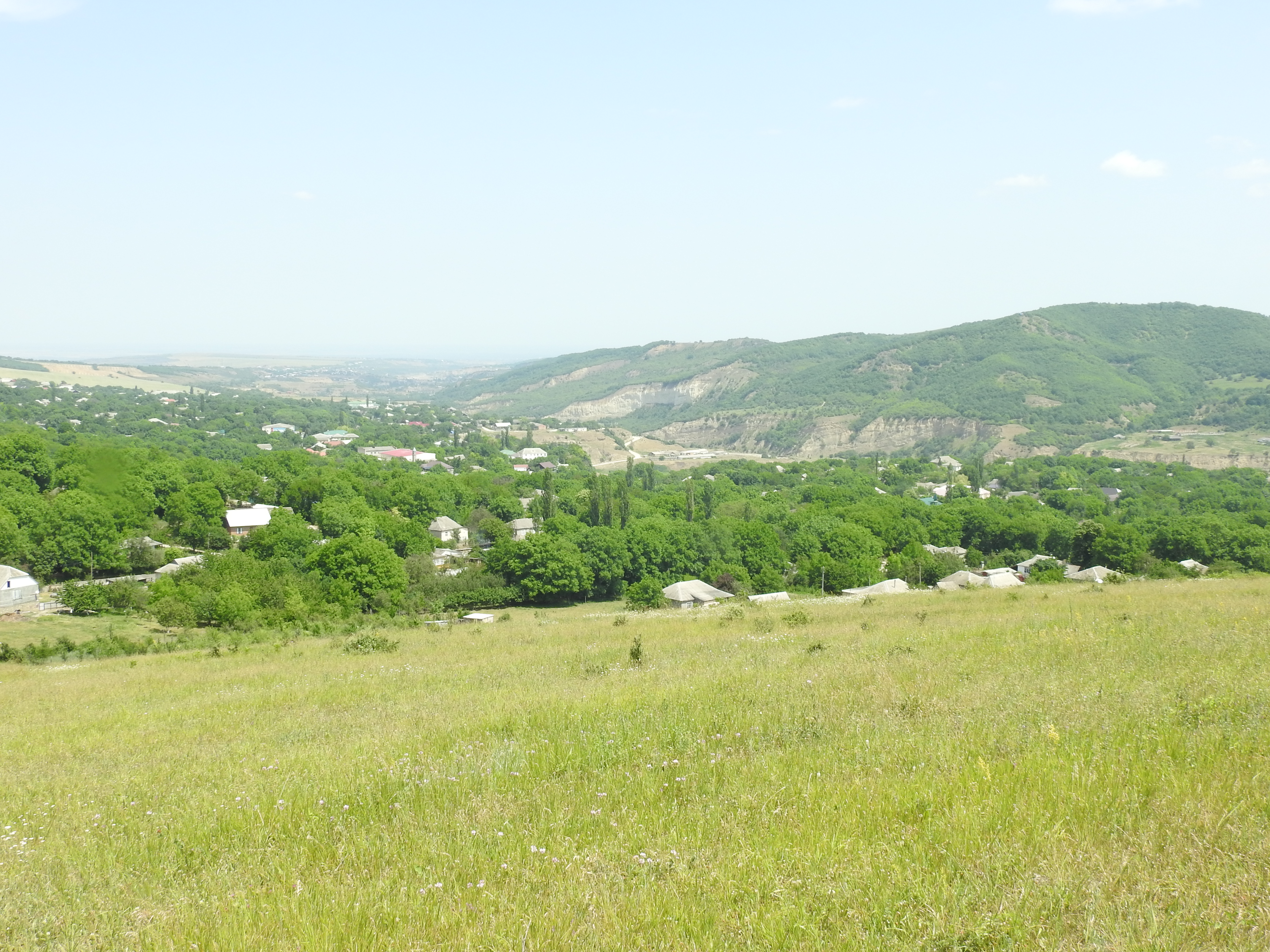
- A view of the hills of Chapayevo.

- Location within Republic of Dagestan Location within Russia
- Coordinates: 43°06′N 46°29′E
- Country: Russia
- Region: Republic of Dagestan
- District: Novolaksky District
- Time zone: UTC+3:00

Chapayevo (Russian: Чапаево; Chechen: Кешен-Эвла, Keşen-Evla) is a rural locality (a selo) in Novolaksky District, Republic of Dagestan, Russia. The population was 2,386 as of 2010. There are 55 streets.

== Geography ==
It is located south of Khasavyurt, on the left bank of the Yaryk-su River.

== Nationalities ==
Chechens and Laks live there.
