= Irbaykhan Baybulatov =

Soviet senior lieutenant (1912–1943)

Irbaykhan Adylkhanovich Baybulatov
- Ирбайхан Адылханович Байбулатов
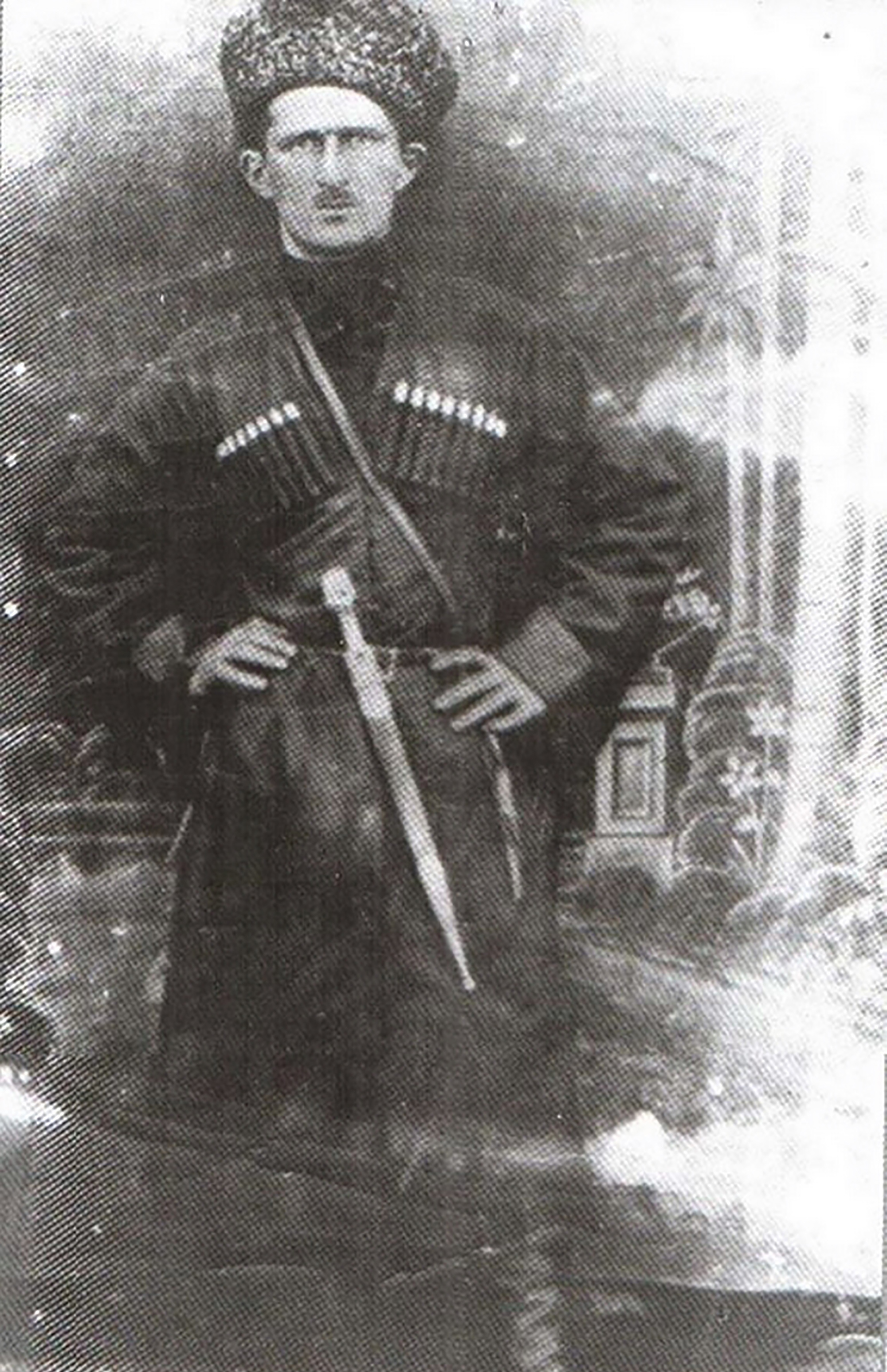
- Born: March 1912; Osmanyurt, Terek Oblast, Russian Empire
- Died: 12 October 1943 (aged 31); Melitopol, Ukrainian SSR, USSR
- Military career
- Allegiance: Soviet Union
- Branch: Red Army
- Service years: 1941 – 1943
- Rank: Senior Lieutenant
- Unit: 690th Rifle Regiment
- Conflicts: World War II; Melitopol Offensive †
- Awards: Hero of the Soviet Union

Irbaykhan Adylkhanovich Baybulatov (Chechen: Ирбайхан Адылханович Байбулатов; 1912 – 12 October 1943) was a senior lieutenant and battalion commander in the Soviet Army during the Second World War who was posthumously awarded the title Hero of the Soviet Union.

== Early life ==
Baybulatov was born in 1912 to a Chechen peasant family in the village of Osmanyurt, then part of the Russian Empire. Due to an order from above discouraging commanders from nominating Vainakh peoples for the title of Hero of the Soviet Union, his nationality was listed as Kumyk in official Soviet documents. In 1938 he graduated from Grozny Pedagogical School, after which he worked as a school principal in his home village.

== Second World War ==
Immediately after the launch of operation Barbarossa, Baybulatov was drafted into the Soviet Army. He trained at the officer at the Buynaksk Infantry School, which he graduated from in 1942. In January 1943 he was deployed as a platoon commander of in the 690th Rifle Regiment. During the battle for one village he led his machine gunners in repelling attacks from the German Army to break out of an encirclement. During the battle he took over the roles of his injured comrades, and was seriously injured while repelling an attack; he was mistakenly believed to be dead and a death notice was sent to his family. However, he was alive and survived his injuries after being taken to a hospital. For his courage in that engagement he was awarded the Order of the Red Star. He was able to return to his regiment after recovering from his injuries.

By the time Baybulatov was promoted as commander of the 1st Rifle Battalion within his regiment, the entire 126th Rifle Division was engaged in heavy fighting for the control of Melitopol. During the fighting in autumn his battalion became one of the first to reach the city, doing so under the cover of tanks. After breaking through the outskirts of the city he led his battalion in the advance and clearing the city of Axis forces. In late October they were fighting to expel German forces from the central part of the city, street by street. From 19 to 23 October Baybulatov killed over 20 axis soldiers and took out two enemy tanks; during that time his battalion took out seven tanks, killed about 1,000 axis soldiers, repelled 19 counterattacks, and suppressed 19 firing points. He was killed in action less than a week before he was awarded the title Hero of the Soviet Union.

== Awards ==
- Hero of the Soviet Union
