= Tukhchar =

Selo in the Republic of Dagestan, Russia

Tukhchar Тухчар Билт-Эвла
- Selo
- Location within Republic of Dagestan Location within Russia
- Coordinates: 43°13′N 46°24′E
- Country: Russia
- Region: Republic of Dagestan
- District: Novolaksky District
- Time zone: UTC+3:00

Tukhchar (Russian: Тухчар; Chechen: Билт-Эвла, Bilt-Ēvla) is a rural locality (a selo) in Novolaksky District, Republic of Dagestan, Russia. The population was 3,567 as of 2010. There are 105 streets.

== Geography ==
Tukhchar is located 18 km southwest of Khasavyurt, on the right bank of the Aksay River. Ishkhoy and Gerzel-Aul are the nearest rural localities.

== Ethnicities ==
Chechens, Avars and Laks live there.

== See also ==
- Tukhchar massacre
