= Gamiyakh =

Gamiyakh Гамиях Мини-АтагӀа
- Selo
- Location within Republic of Dagestan Location within Russia
- Coordinates: 43°12′N 46°29′E
- Country: Russia
- Region: Republic of Dagestan
- District: Novolaksky District
- Time zone: UTC+3:00

Gamiyakh (Russian: Гамиях; Chechen: Мини-АтагӀа, Mini-Ataġa) is a rural locality (a selo) in Barchkhoyotarsky Selsoviet, Novolaksky District, Republic of Dagestan, Russia. The population was 2,528 as of 2010. There are 23 streets.

== Geography ==
Gamiyakh is located 12 km southwest of Khasavyurt, on the bank of the Yamansu River. Novochurtakh and Zoriotar are the nearest rural localities.

== Nationalities ==
Chechens, Avars and Laks live there.
