= Banayurt =

Banayurt Банайюрт Боони-Йурт
- Selo
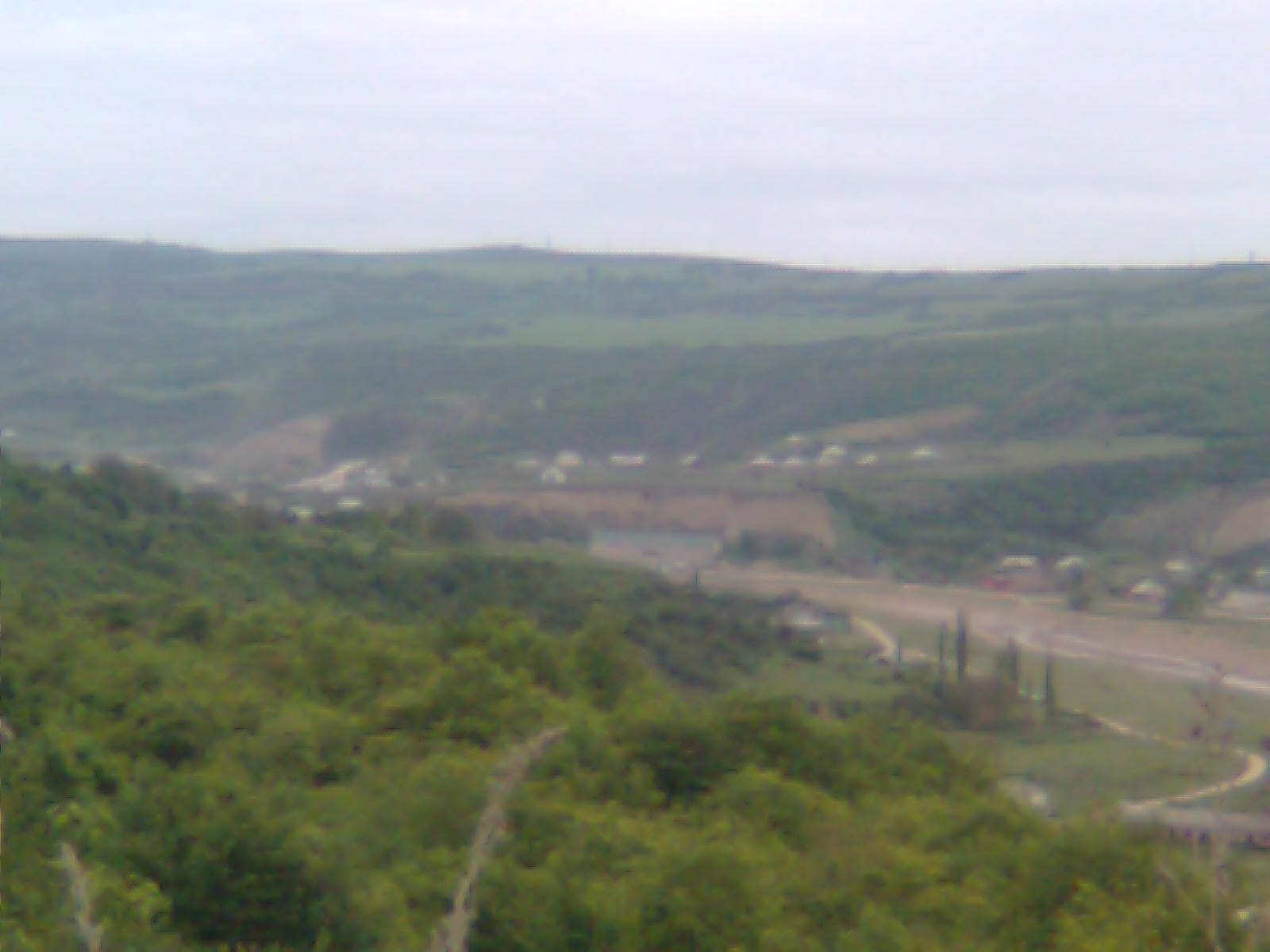

- Location within Republic of Dagestan Location within Russia
- Coordinates: 43°08′N 46°26′E
- Country: Russia
- Region: Republic of Dagestan
- District: Novolaksky District
- Time zone: UTC+3:00

Banayurt (Russian: Банайюрт; Chechen: Боони-Йурт, Booni-Yurt) is a rural locality (a selo) in Novolaksky District, Republic of Dagestan, Russia. The population was 1,036 as of 2010. There are 18 streets.

== Geography ==
Banayurt is located 19 km southwest of Khasavyurt, on the left bank of the Yamansu River. Yamansu and Barchkhoyotar are the nearest rural localities.

== Nationalities ==
Chechens live there.

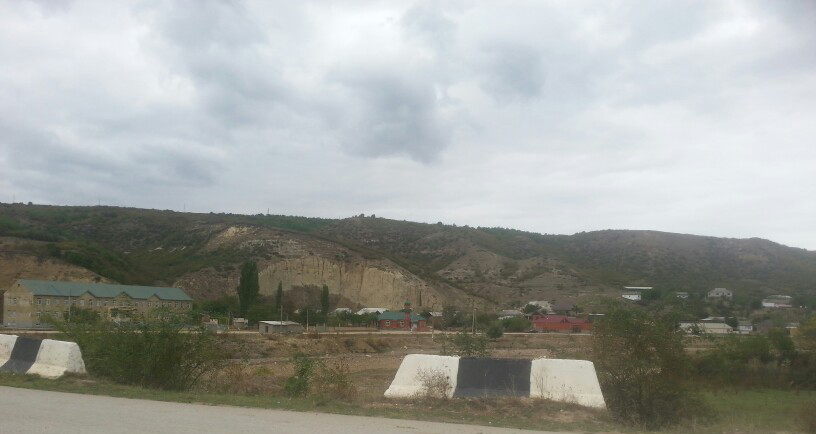
Buildings in Banayurt
