= Leninaul (Kazbekovsky District) =

Leninaul Ленинаул Пхьарчхошка
- Selo
- Location within Republic of Dagestan Location within Russia
- Coordinates: 43°05′N 46°34′E
- Country: Russia
- Region: Republic of Dagestan
- District: Kazbekovsky District
- Time zone: UTC+3:00

Leninaul (Russian: Ленинаул; Chechen: Пхьарчхошка, Pẋarçoşka) is a rural locality (a selo) in Kazbekovsky District, Republic of Dagestan, Russia. The population was 8,340 as of 2010. There are 94 streets.

== Geography ==
Leninaul is located on the left bank of the Aktash River, 9 km northwest of Dylym (the district's administrative centre) by road. Kalininaul and Dylym are the nearest rural localities.

== Nationalities ==
Avars and Chechens live there.
