= Glottopedia =

Wiki project devoted to linguistics

- Website type: Wiki for linguistics
- Available in: English, German, etc.
- Website: www.glottopedia.org
- Registration: Optional (required to edit pages)
- Users: 356
- Launched: 27 May 2007
- Current status: Active
- Content license: CC BY-SA

Glottopedia is a wiki devoted to linguistics.

== History ==
Glottopedia was created on 27 May 2007 as a merger of two earlier projects, WikiLingua at the University of Trier (created in 2005), and Linguipedia at the Max Planck Institute for Evolutionary Anthropology in Leipzig (created in 2006). Many or most of its topics are as of May 2016 treated on two pages, in English and German respectively. The content is licensed under the Creative Commons Attribution-ShareAlike 3.0 licence.

It is implemented with the MediaWiki wiki engine, and limits editing to registered contributors with their real names. As of 2024, it has about 3,246 content pages by 407 registered users.
