= Novolakskoye =

Rural locality in Dagestan, Russia

Coordinates: 43°07′20″N 46°29′00″E

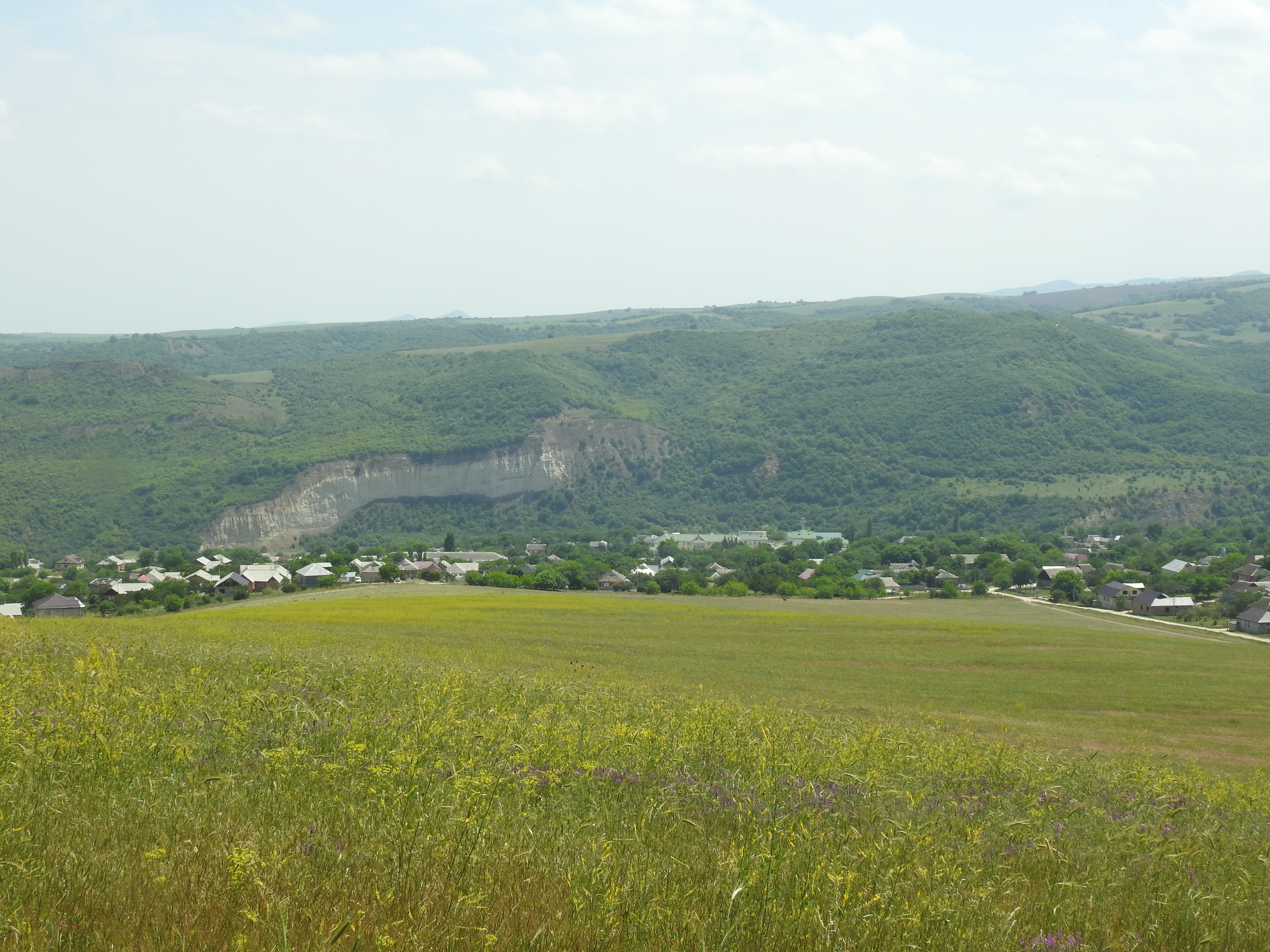
Panorama of Novolakskoye

Novolakskoye (Russian: Новолакское; Lak: Новолак; Chechen: Бони-Эвла, Boni-Evla) is a rural locality (a selo) and the administrative center of Novolaksky District of the Republic of Dagestan, Russia. Population: 5,951 (2010 census); 4,169 (2002 census); 2,785 (1989 Soviet census).
