= Novolaksky District =

Novolaksky District Новолакский район (Russian)
- District

Other transcription(s)
  - Lak: Цӏуссалакрал кIану
  - Chechen: ГӀазгӀумкийн керла кӀошт
  - Avar: ЦІиябтум мухъ
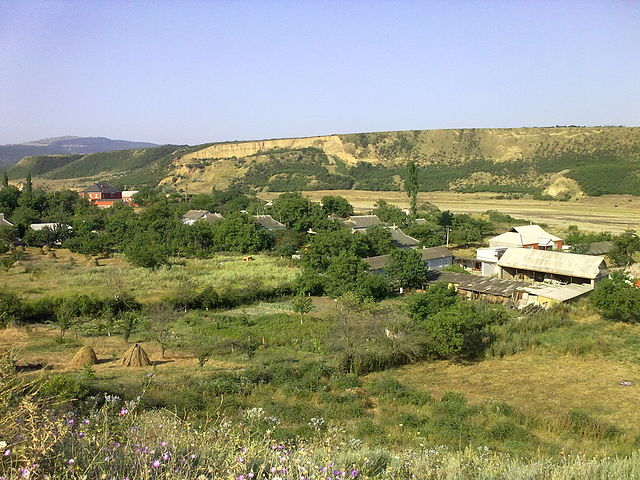
- Village (selo) Zori-Otar, Novolaksky District

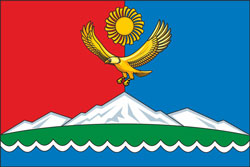
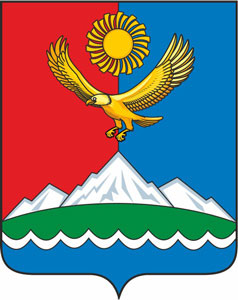
- Flag Coat of arms
- Location of Novolaksky District in the Republic of Dagestan
- Coordinates: 43°07′N 46°29′E
- Country: Russia
- Federal subject: Republic of Dagestan
- Established: 1944
- Administrative center: Novolakskoye

Area
  - Total: 218.2 km^{2} (84.2 sq mi)

Population (2010 Census)
  - Total: 28,556
  - Density: 130.9/km^{2} (339.0/sq mi)
  - Urban: 0%
  - Rural: 100%

Administrative structure
  - Administrative divisions: 3 Selsoviets
  - Inhabited localities: 15 rural localities

Municipal structure
  - Municipally incorporated as: Novolaksky Municipal District
  - Municipal divisions: 0 urban settlements, 12 rural settlements
- Time zone: UTC+3 (MSK)
- OKTMO ID: 82639000
- Website: http://mo-novolak.ru/

Population of Novolaksky District
- 2010 Census: 28,556
- 2002 Census: 22,019
- 1989 Census: 13,381
- 1979 Census: 11,447

Novolaksky District (Russian: Новола́кский райо́н; Lak: Цӏуссалакрал кIану) is an administrative and municipal district (raion), one of the forty-one in the Republic of Dagestan, Russia. It is located in the west of the republic and borders with Khasavyurtovsky District in the northeast, Kazbekovsky District in the southeast, and with the Chechen Republic in the west. The area of the district is 218.2 square kilometers (84.2 sq mi). Its administrative center is the rural locality (a selo) of Novolakskoye. As of the 2010 Census, the total population of the district was 28,556, with the population of Novolakskoye accounting for 20.8% of that number.

== History ==
The area of the modern district was historically a part of Aukh, the homeland of the Aukhs Chechens (one of the nine Chechen tukkhums). During the Soviet times, it was incorporated as Aukh District of the Chechen-Ingush ASSR and included the territories of modern Novolaksky District along with parts of Kazbekovsky and Khasavyurtovsky Districts. In 1944, when the Chechens were deported to Siberia and Kazakhstan, Aukh District was split, and Avars, Laks, Russians, and Kumyks were moved in to replace the deported Chechen population. Novolaksky District was resettled mainly by Laks (hence the name "Novolaksky"; literally "New Lak District"), but some Russians and Avars were settled there too. The mainly Chechen toponyms were replaced with Russian, Avar, and Lak ones.

When the Chechens began returning in 1957, conflicts erupted, as they found others literally living in their houses. Fortunately, the two sides came to an understanding. Neither Laks nor Chechens had much hatred for the other side, and both blamed Moscow for the conflict rather. Chechens understood that Laks had been forced against their will to move there, and did not want to be homeless; Laks understood that Aukh was the Chechens' historical home and they had nowhere else to go. The conflict is still being solved currently by the government of Dagestan with the help of local governments. Laks are being resettled, village by village, to the marsh north of Makhachkala, and Chechen names and the Chechen ownership have been restored to many villages. The process, however, is not complete, and there is still room for pitfalls in the negotiation process. Furthermore, there is still the problem of the Avar-settled former Chechen villages.

== Administrative and municipal status ==
Within the framework of administrative divisions, Novolaksky District is one of the forty-one in the Republic of Dagestan. The district is divided into three selsoviets which comprise fifteen rural localities. As a municipal division, the district is incorporated as Novolaksky Municipal District. Its three selsoviets are incorporated as twelve rural settlements within the municipal district. The selo of Novolakskoye serves as the administrative center of both the administrative and municipal district.

== See also ==
- History of the Lak people
- History of Chechnya
