= Cheberloy =

Chechen ethnic group

Чӏабарлой
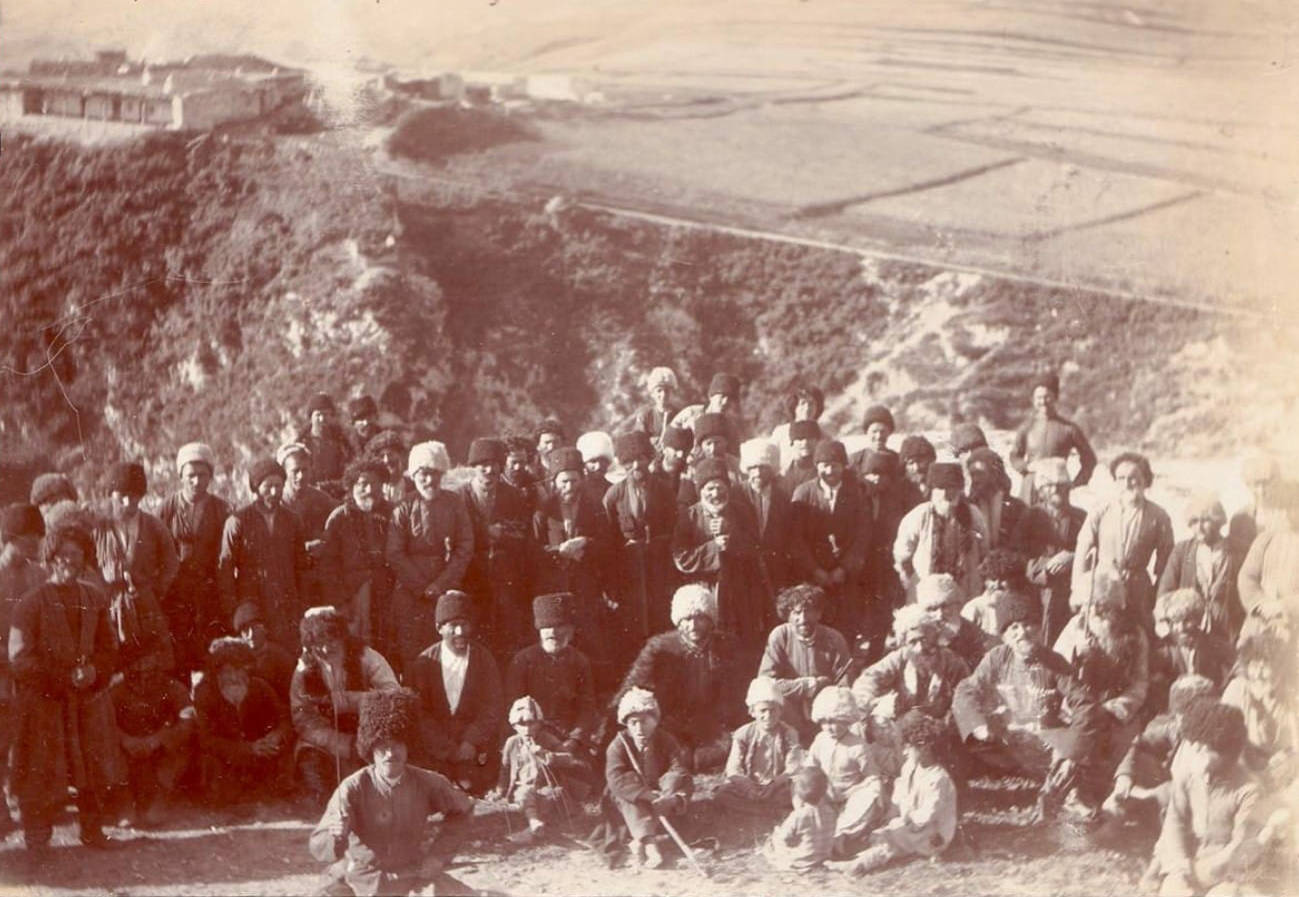
- Cheberloy people in 1905

Regions with significant populations
- Chebarla and Cheberloyevsky District

Languages
- Cheberloevsky dialect of Chechen

Religion
- Vainakh religion, Sunni Islam

Related ethnic groups
- Chechens, Nakh peoples, Ingush people, Bats people, Avar people, Andi people

The Cheberloy people (Chechen: Чӏабарлой, romanized: Cheberloy), also known by the exonym Tadbutri (Тадбутри), are a Chechen society or clan that is sometimes classified as a Tukkhum (tribal union). The Cheberloy are historically from south-east Chechnya in modern-day Cheberloyevsky District near the northern border of Dagestan in what is historically known as Chebarla (Chechen: ЧӀебарла).

== General information ==
=== Etymology ===
According to Chechen Soviet researcher Akhmad Suleimanov, the term "chlaba/ chleba" (чӀаба/ чӀеба) in the Cheberloevsky dialect roughly translates to plateau. Geographically, the Cheberloy were primarily located on a plateau formed by the southeastern spurs of the Andian ridge in the Caucasus which is likley the origin of the ethnic name.

=== Clans ===
The Cheberloy make up 24 different clans (Teip) including the:

- Achaloy
- Baskhoy
- Bagacharay
- Bossoi
- Bunikhoy (Buni)
- Chubakhkinaroy
- Dai
- Gumkhoy
- Ihoroy (Ikharoy)
- Kiriy
- Kezenoy
- Kharkaroy
- Khindoy
- Khoy
- Kuloy
- Makazhoy
- Nizhaloy
- Nokhch-Keloy
- Orsoy
- Rigakhoy
- Sadoy
- Tsikaroy
- Tundukoy
- Zheloshkhoy

== History ==
According to Lecha M. Ilyasov, the settlement of Cheberloy and the Cheberloy people are first mentioned in sources from the 16th and 17th centuries under the name Chabril (Russian: Шабриль). A.E. Rossikova, a Russian ethnographer and traveler describes the Cheberloy people as being "high, with [a] well-developed figure, somewhat lean, with open and attractive faces, their type maybe similar to Russian, but with the stern and penetrating look of dark eyes". One of the earliest recorded people of the Cherebloy is Aldaman Gheza, a Chechen feudal lord of the Makazho/Makazhoy clan of Cheberloy who fought in the Battle of Khachara against the Avar Khanate.

=== Settlements ===
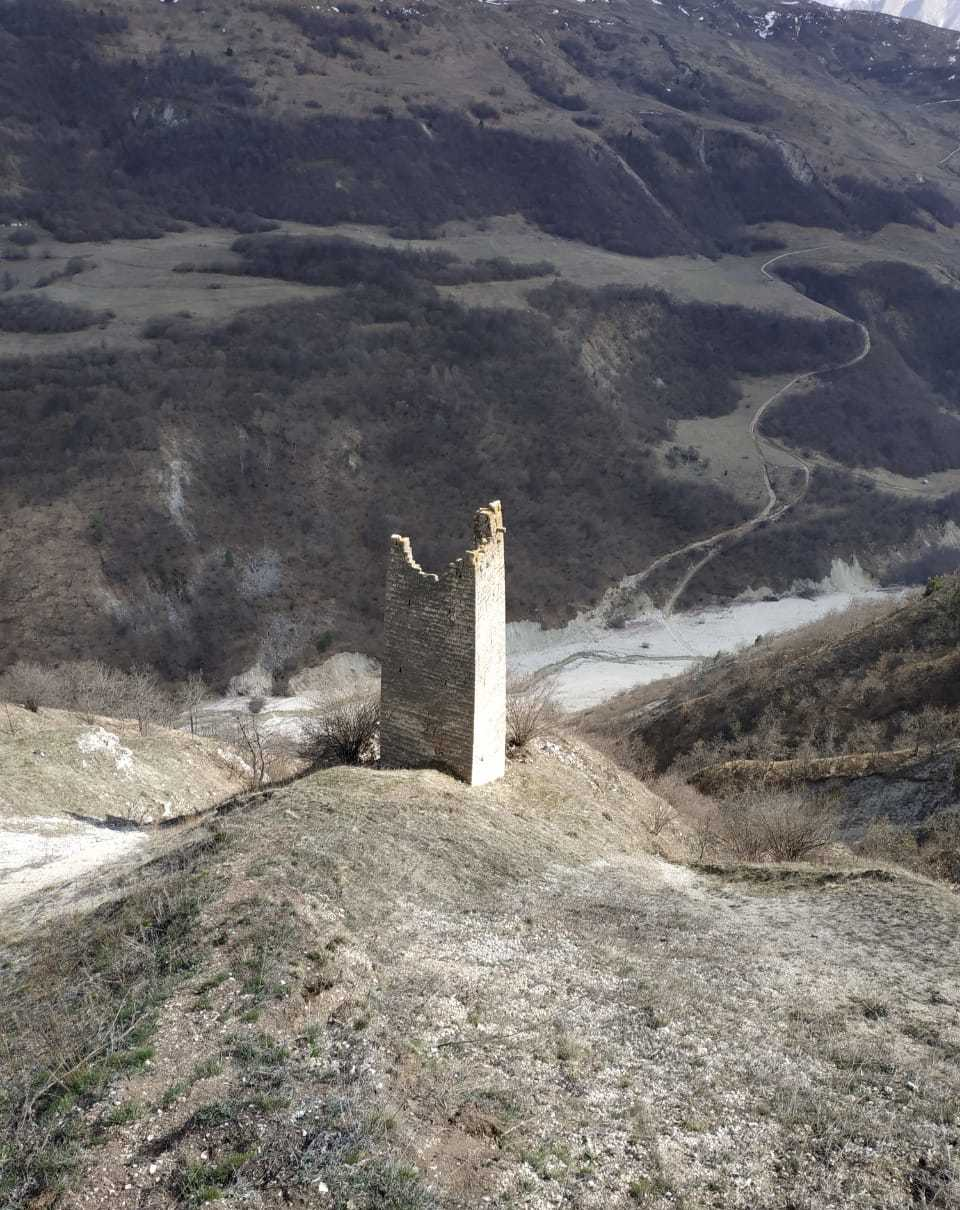
A Chechen tower in Achaloy, an abandoned Aul following Operation Lentil

The settlement of Makazhoy in Cheberloyevsky District is considered the heart of Cheberloy society. Other settlements within Cheberloyevsky District which contain or used to contain significant amounts of Cheberloy people include the settlements (Aul) of Achaloy, Bogacheroy, Bosoi (Bosoy), Buni, Dai, Ikharoy, Kiri, Kezenoy, Kuloy, Nizhaloy, Nokhchi-Keloy, Arsoy, Rigakhoy, Sadoy, Kharkaroy, Khindoy, Khoy, Tsikaroi, and Chubakh-Keneroy among others. Many settlements which used to host large populations of the Cheberloy are now ghost towns or no longer exist due to the deportation of Chechens during Operation Lentil in the spring of 1944.

=== Religion ===
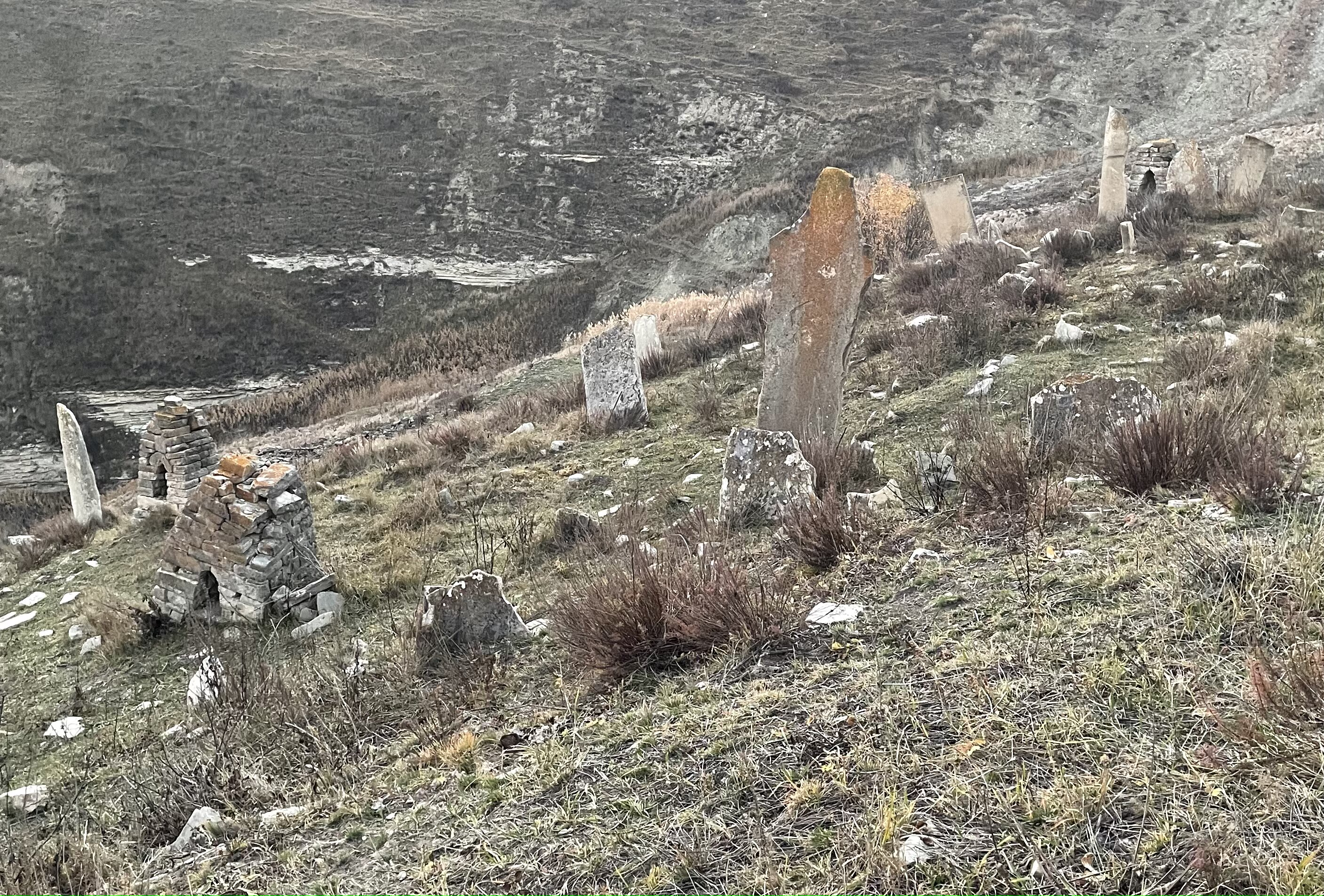
A Muslim cemetery in the ruins of Makazhoy

The Cheberloy were some of the first people of the Caucasus to convert from Circassian paganism, such as the Vainakh religion, to Islam. The Cheberloy are particular adherents to Sunni Islam similar to many other Muslim ethnic groups living in the Caucasus.

== Gallery ==
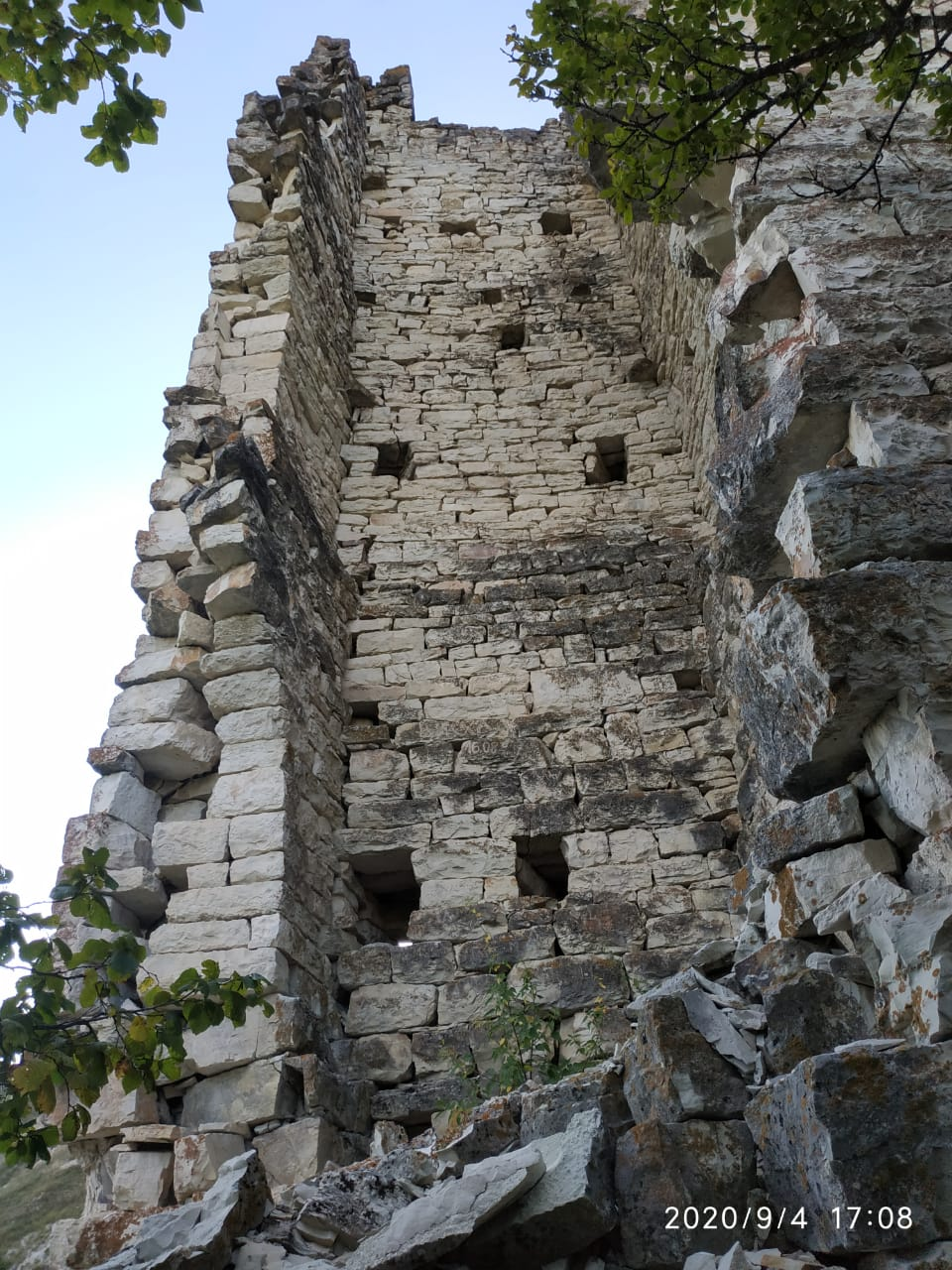
Cheberloy tower in Achaloy

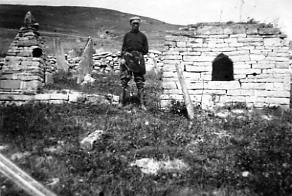
Ruins of Makazhoy

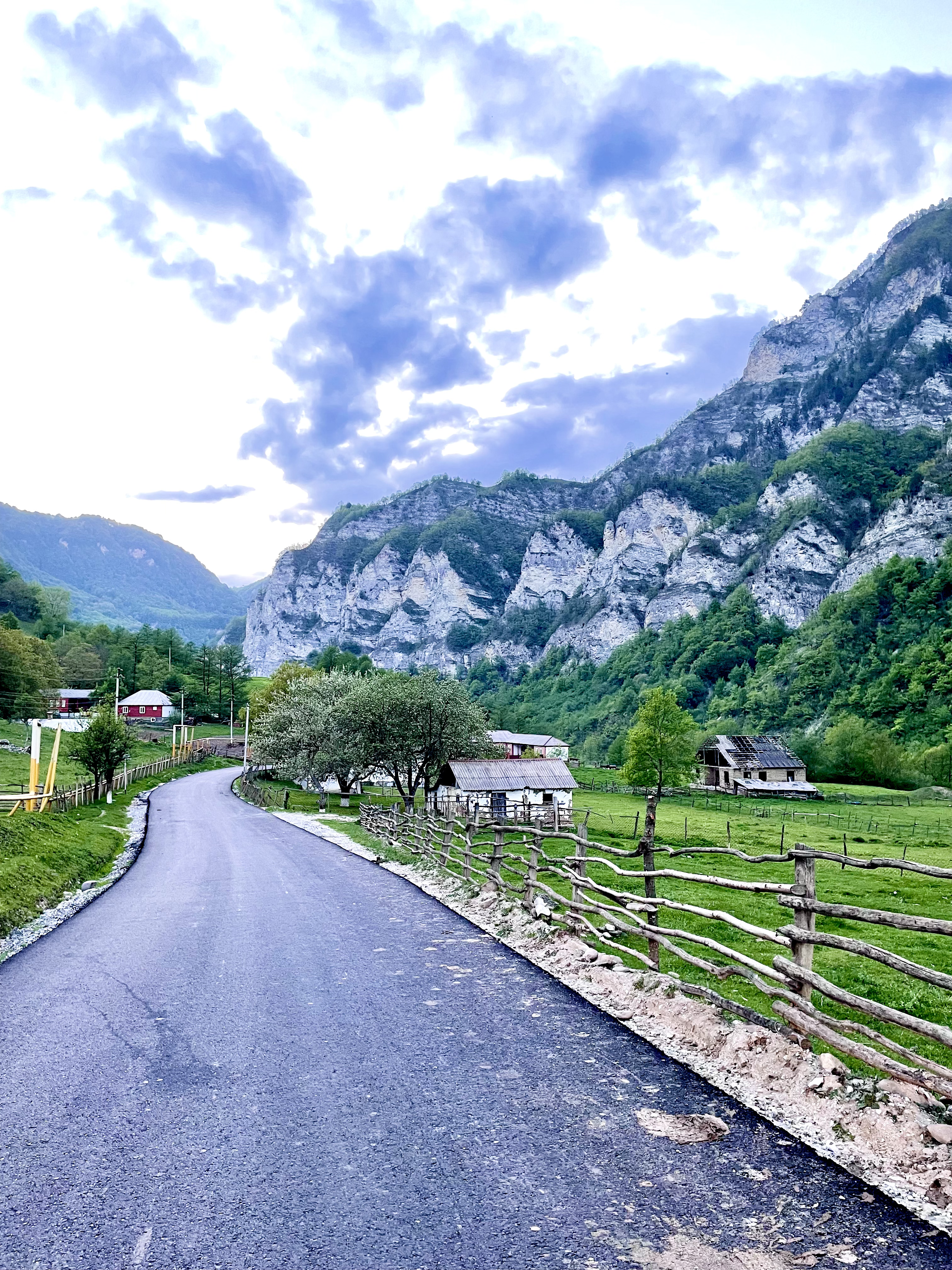
Dai

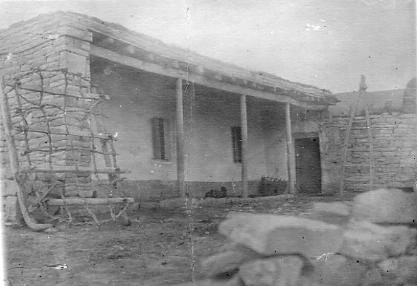
Ikharoy (Ihara)

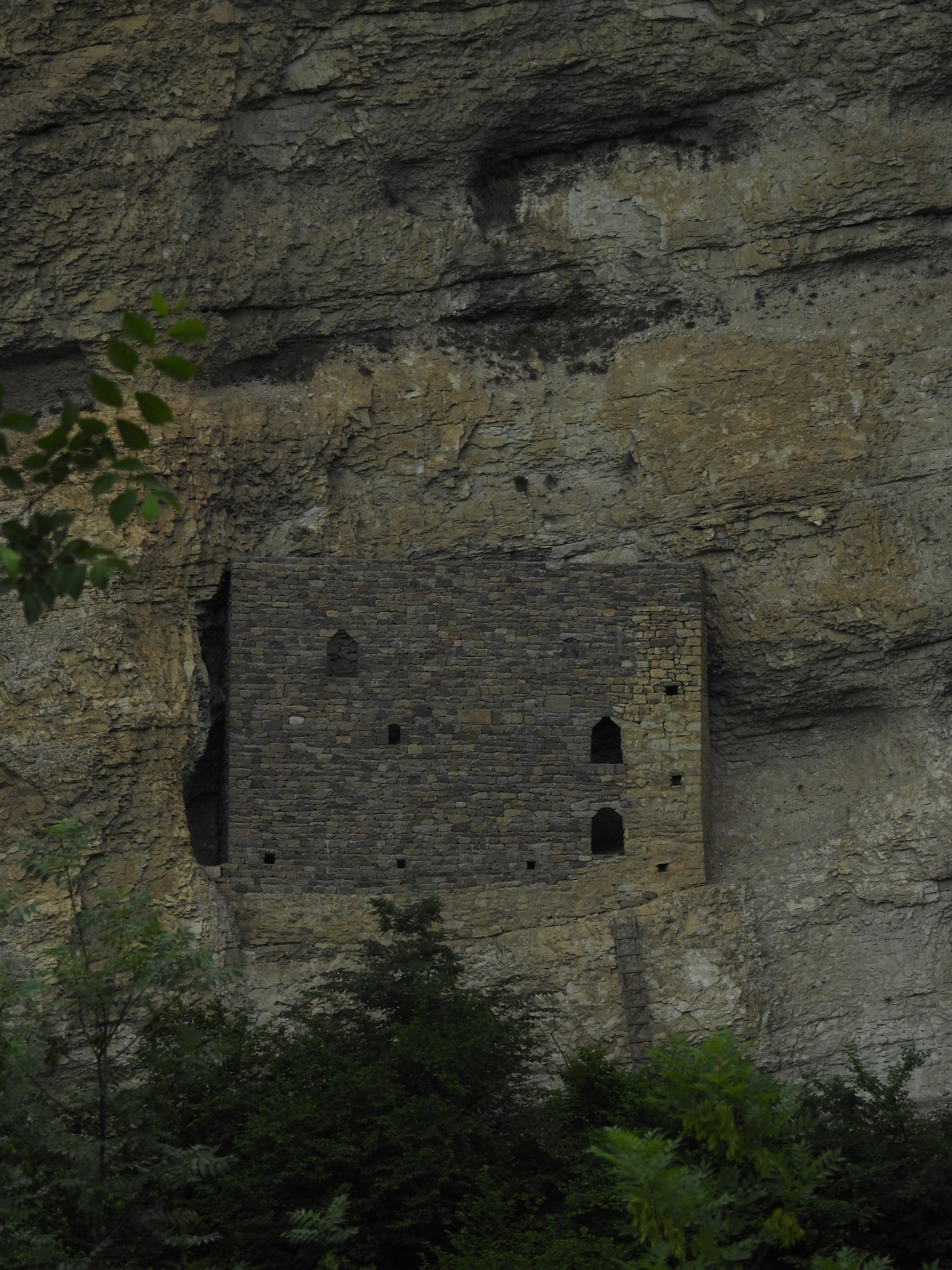
Rock tower in Nizhaloy (Nihaloy)

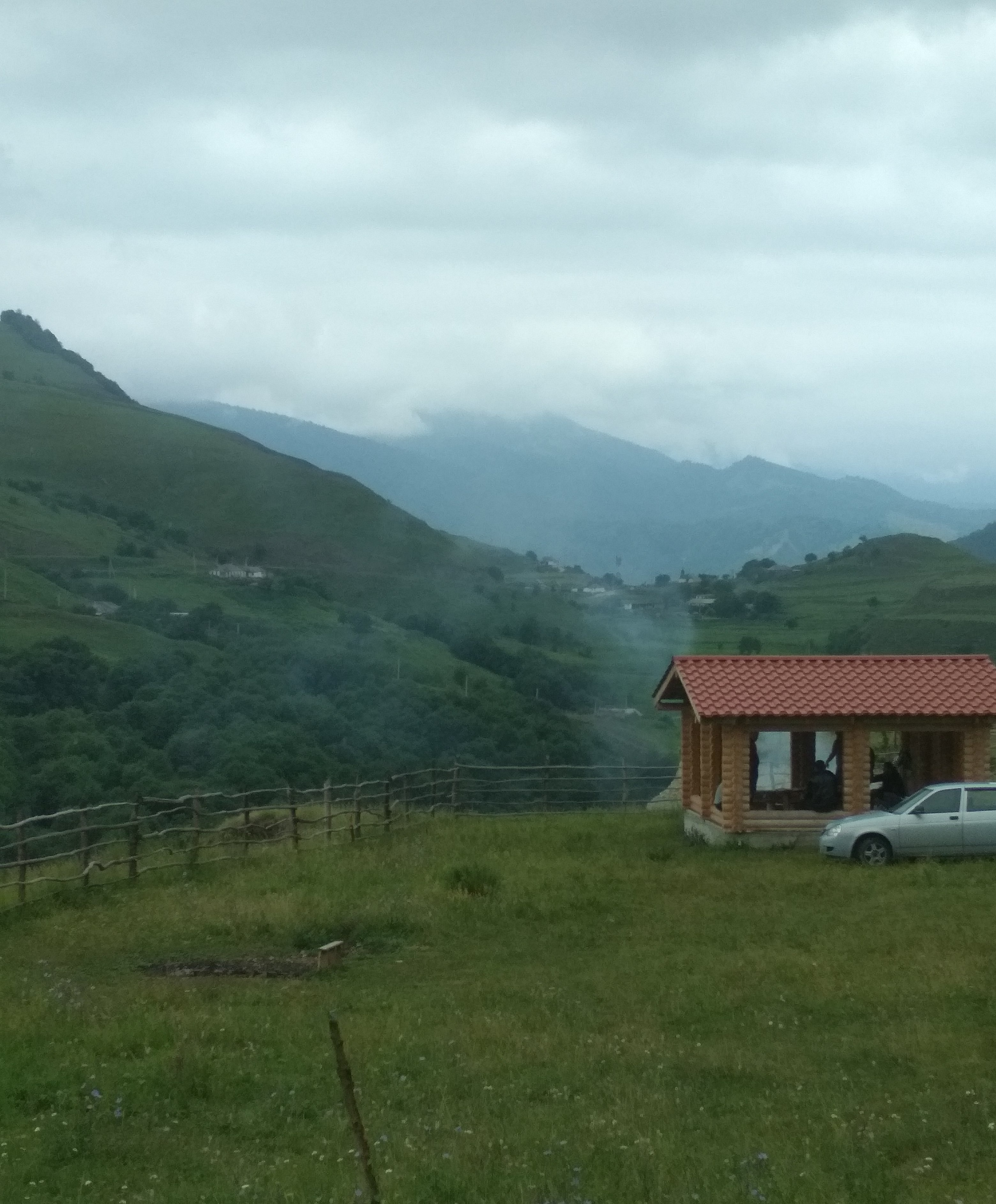
Nokhchi-Keloy

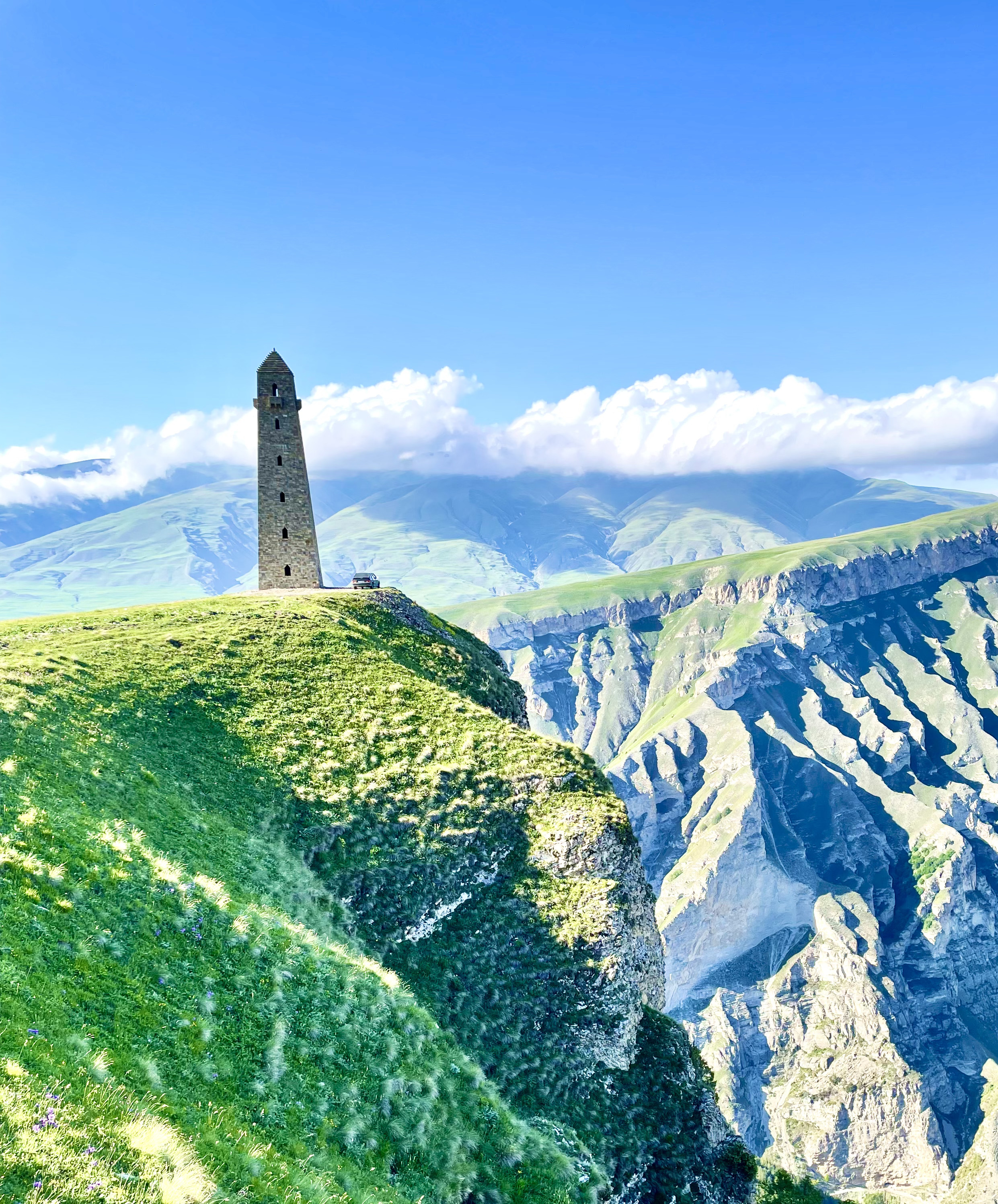
Sadoy

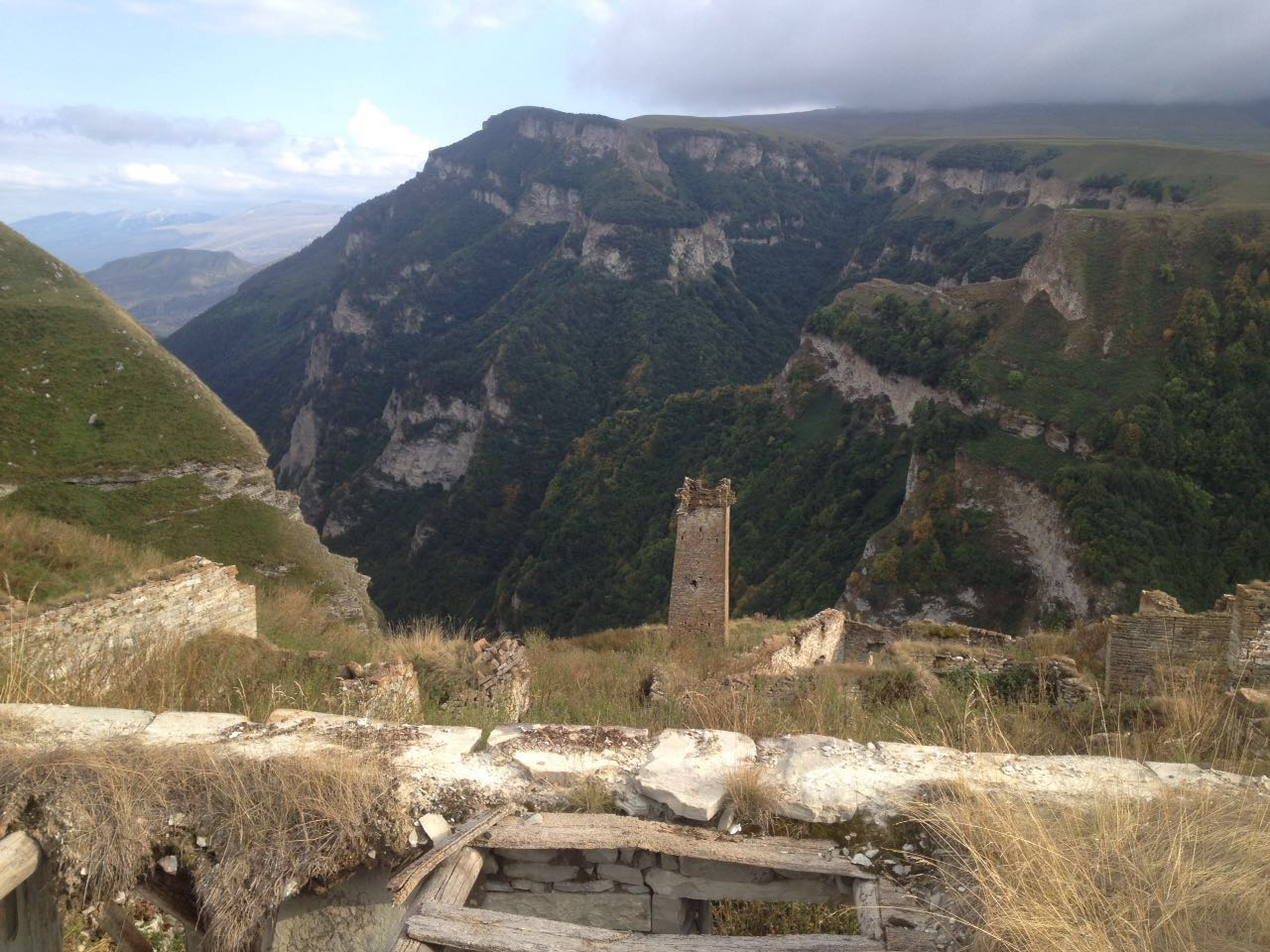
Kharkaroy

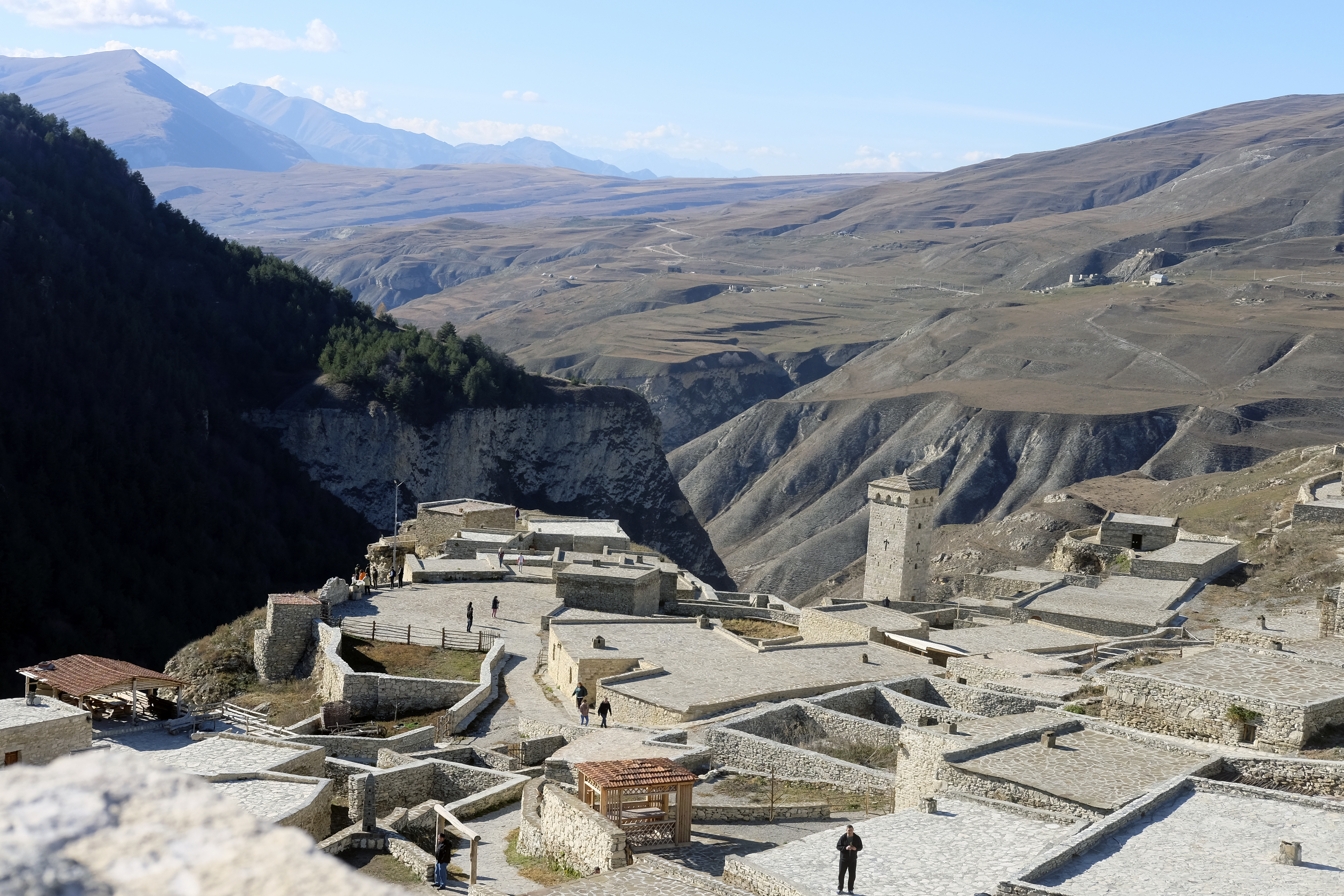
Khoy (Hoy)

== Notable people ==
- Aldaman Gheza - 17th century feudal lord.
- Abdurakhman Avtorkhanov - Chechen historian of Cheberloy ancestry.
- Kunta-Hajji - prominent Sufi figure.
- Muslim Cheberloevsky - Battalion commander of the Sheikh Mansur Battalion in the Russo-Ukrainian war.
- Adin Surkho - Chechen folk hero and leader of the Kezenoy teip.
- Idil Vedensky - Naib, soldier, and general under Imam Shamil.
- Dada Zalmaev - Chechen rebel leader during the 1877 Chechen uprising.

== See also ==
- Tukkhum
- History of Chechnya
- Chechens
- Nakh Peoples
