= Zandkhoy =

Zandq̇oy
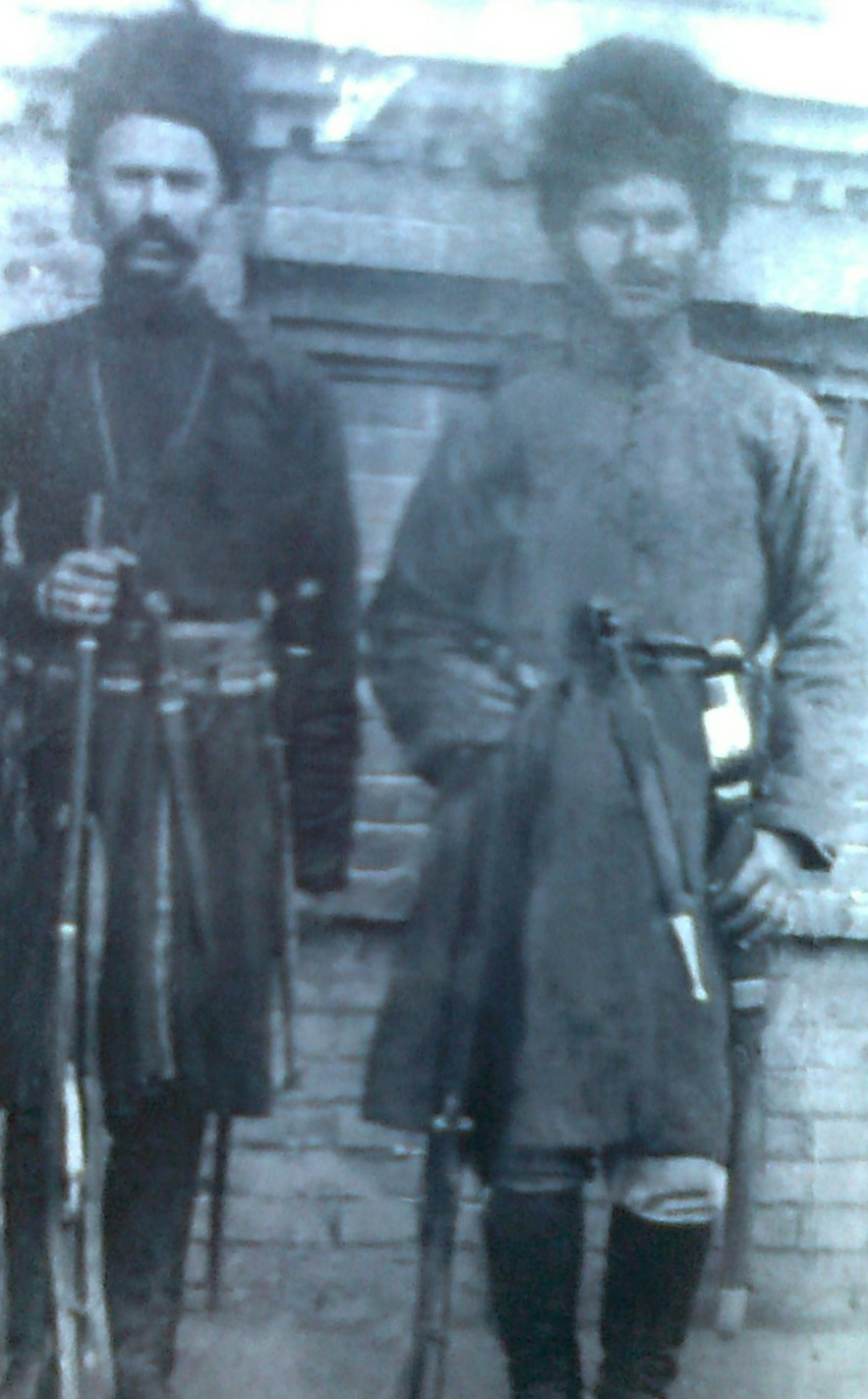
- Portrait of a pair of Zandkhoy's from Aukh, c. 1918

Total population
- 70,000

Regions with significant populations
- Chechnya, Dagestan

Languages
- Nokhchmakhkakhoy and Aukh dialect of the Chechen language

Religion
- Islam

The Zandkhoy, or Zandakhoy, (Chechen: Зандакъой or Зандкъой; Zandaq̇oy or Zandq̇oy) are a Chechen teip (clan) from the historic region of Ichkeria and belongs to the tukkhum Nokhchmakhkakhoy, also called Ichkerians. The centre of the teip is the village Zandak, which is located in the Nozhay-Yurtovsky District.

== Geography ==
Members of the teip live all across the Chechen Republic and the Aukh region of today's Dagestan. They either make up the majority or founded the following villages

- Baytarki (Байтарки)
- Gamiyakh (Гамиях)
- Gilyani (Гиляны)
- Mazhgara (Мажгара)
- Simsir (Симсир)
- Zandak-Ara (Зандак-Ара)

The teip also had historical settlements in other parts of Chechnya which were named after their native village Zandak, like on the right side of the Gums (a tributary of the Sunzha) and one between the Gekhi and Valerik. These were burned down during the Russian conquest of the Caucasus.

== Etymology ==
The origin of the word Zandak is unknown, although historians believe it possibly derived from the word sona/sana, which means angle, and duk, meaning ridge. There is also the common belief that the name derives from Zana, who according to a legend was the founder of the teip (Zana + duk, Zanas ridge).

== History ==
The village is the name giverfor the Zandak culture, an archaeological culture spanning from the 11th to the 7th century BC. The burial ground of the culture was accidentally discovered in 1952 and was made up of 66 burials in which they found several arrowheads, spear tips, a brush, a bracelet and other things.

During the Caucasian War, members of the teip supported the Caucasian Imamate and fought consistently against the Russian conquerors. Among them was Gheza-Hadzhi Zandakskiy, a Sufi preacher and spiritual leader of the Chechens.

In 1877, inhabitants of Zandak and other mountain villages in Eastern Chechnya, started an uprising under the fellow Zandkhoy Alibek-Hadzhi Aldamov. The uprising lasted until 27 November, when Aldamov decided to surrender and put an end to the suffering Chechens went through. During the uprising, many Chechen villages were burned down by Russian forces, including Zandak, Baytarki and Alibeks home village, Simsir, on 17 May. Inhabitants of these villages were then pushed to the planes or deported to Dagestan.

In the course of the Chechen-Ingush deportation in 1944, Zandak was renamed Dagbash and resettled with people from Dagestan. After the restoration of the Chechen-Ingush Autonomous Soviet Socialist Republic, the village returned to its former name Zandak and the Dagestanis resettled back to Dagestan.

== Branches ==
The teip is split into 11 branches (некъи, neq̇i): the Zaghash neq, Ghoytk neq, Ghurma neq, Baci/Be neq, Le neq, Mentig neq, Arzin/Khaghashan neq, Ghadalan neq, Daki neq, Khornin neq, and Khokhcala neq.

=== Genetics ===
All members of the teip that have tested so far belong to the J1 and J2 haplogroup. 2 families of the Ghurma neq and Daki neq are J1, while the rest are J2, which include one Ghoytk family, one Ghadalan family, one Zaghash family and one Ghurma family.

== Notable Zandkhoy ==
- Aldamov, Alibek-Hadzhi (1850 — 1978) — leader of the uprising in 1877
- Gheza-Hadzhi (1808 — 1867) — scholar, preacher and spiritual leader during the Caucasian War
- Kakiyev, Said-Magomed (1970) — colonel in the Russian Army
- Otarsultanov, Dzhamal (1987) — Olympic wrestler, won the gold medal in men's freestyle 55 kg at the 2012 London Olympics
- Surkov, Vladislav (1964) — businessman and politician
