= Terloy =

Chechen telp

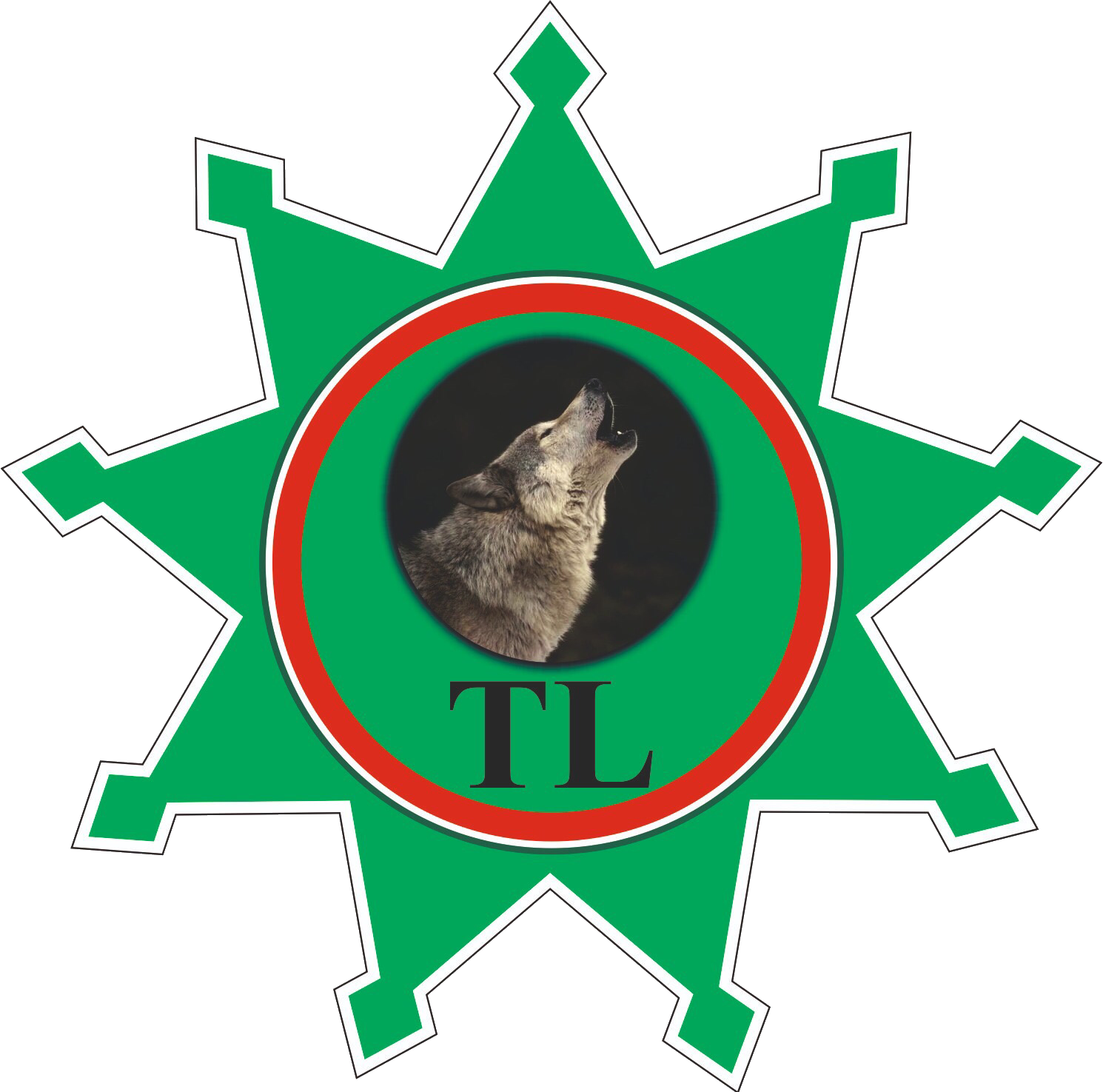
The emblem of the Terloy.

The Terloy (also Terlo, Teroy) (Chechen: ТIерлой, ТIерой) is a Chechen teip. The exact population of the teip is not known, however it is estimated to be around 30,000 people. Terloy speak in the Itum-Kali dialect of the Chechen language.

Chechen writer and poet Magomet Mamakaev defined the Terloy as a tukkhum in his works, however literature, material and legends by the Terloy themselves are proof that they are in fact a larger teip, with all the typical characteristics of a Chechen teip.

== Etymology ==
The name Terloy comes from the geographical place of origin. Ter- meaning "upper" and -loy which indicates to belonging to a group or place.

== History ==
The Terloy originate from Terloy-Mohk, an area in the south-western mountains of Chechnya. There are no people living there after February 1944. All villages were destroyed by Soviet government and was forbidden to live there because the region was considered as rebellious and dangerous. Nowadays the majority of the Terloy tribe reside in the western part of Chechnya, in the Groznensky District, Achkhoy-Martanovsky District, Urus-Martanovsky District, Akhmeta Municipality of Georgia and in some villages in Ingushetia.

In 1994, at the beginning of First Chechen War, there were formed some groups by the Terloy to fight the Russian aggression. There was also one regiment organized by the people of the Galanchozhsky District called "Galanchozhan Polk" but was mostly composed of Terloy, because the leader of the regiment was a Terloy.

«Дийначу нехан буьйда бIаьргаш диина маI-ТIерлой» - "Terloy, who ate uncooked eyes of living people." This is a saying which comes from a folk tale, according to which the Terloys ate the eye of a man from a group of people who came to steal cattle from Terloy. Terloy people killed all the men except one. It was that poor man who lost his eye. They left him as an example for others so that he would tell people who did it and for what reason.

== Terloy sub-tribes ==
List of Terloy sub-tribes, or "gar" in Chechen:

1. Bovloy
2. Gimroy
3. Gezkhoy
4. Kenakhoy
5. Motsaroy
6. Nikarkhoy
7. Oshni
8. Senakhoy
9. Shundiy
10. Eldapkharoy
11. Meshtaroy
12. Guoroy
13. Geshiy
14. Yurdakhoy
15. Tukhoy
16. Idakhoy
17. Celtuqumoy
18. Arstakhoy
19. Zhelashkhoy
20. Barhoy
21. Boshni
22. Beshkhoy
23. Gelashkhoy
24. Zherakhoy
25. Otti
26. Baskhoy
27. Baray
28. Pezhoy
29. Pezhabasoy
30. Burtakhoy

== Gallery ==
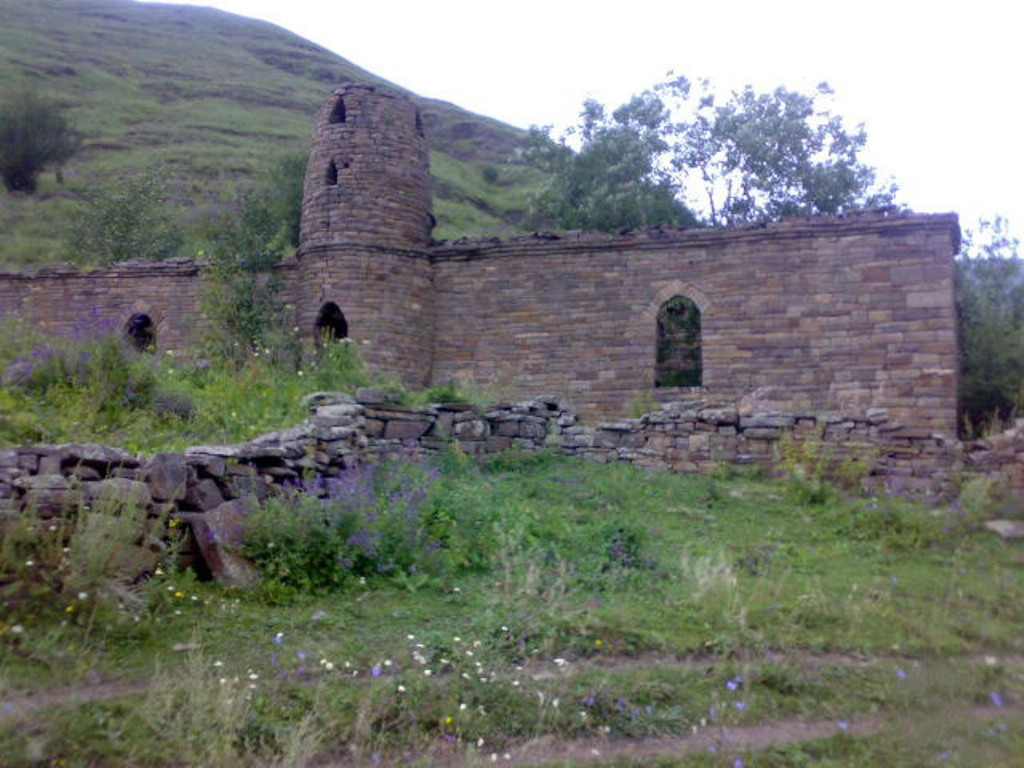
A mosque in the village Oshni

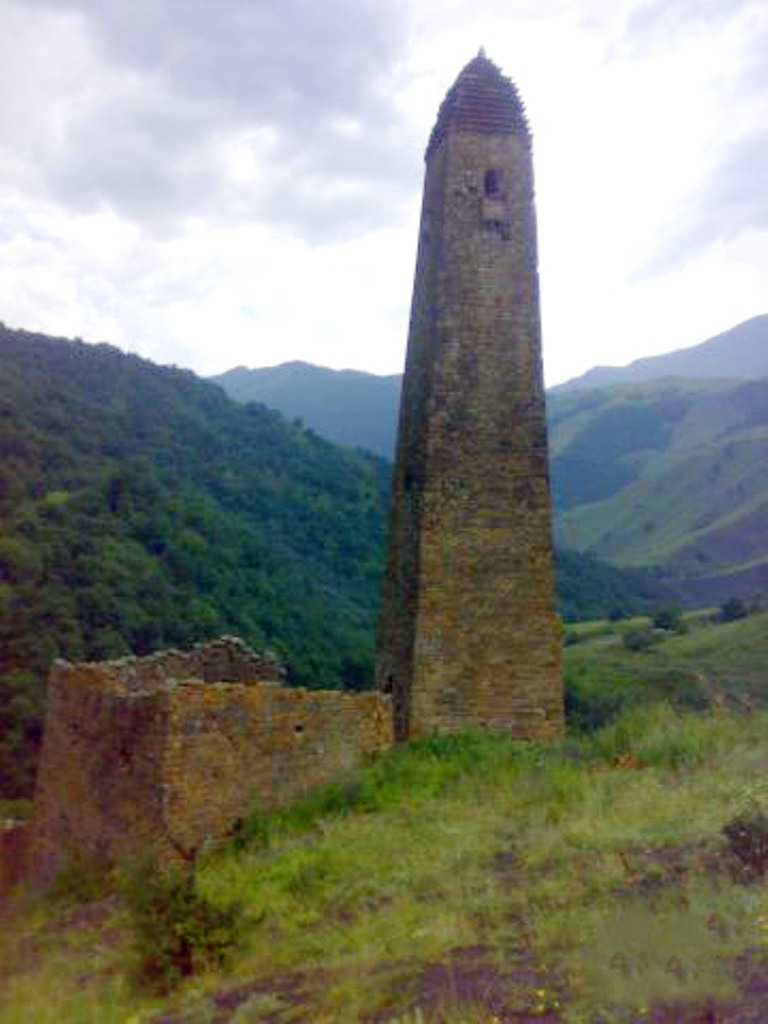
Guard tower in Motsaroy

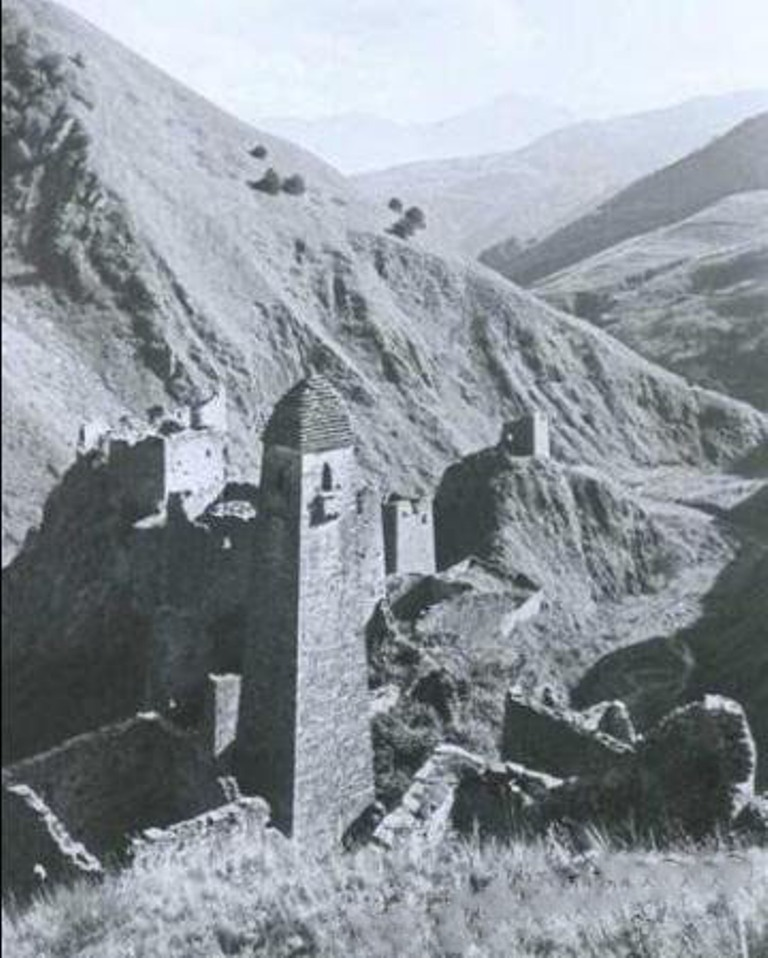
Ruins of the village Nikaroy

== See also ==
- Tukkhum
- Teip
