= Tukkhum =

A union of tribal groups of Chechen people

Tukkhum (Chechen: Тукхам, romanized: Tuqam; from Old Persian: tau(h)ma) is a term and system introduced in the 1960s, most notably by Soviet Chechen writer Magomet Mamakaev in 1962. This system does not properly apply to the Chechen nation and the social structure of Chechen clans.

Mamakaev proposed that the Chechen tukkhum was a type of military-economic union between certain groups of teips, not through consanguinity but established for specific purposes, such as military alliances and economic trade; that the tukkhum occupied a specific territory, which was inhabited by the members of the tukkhum. He also stated that each tukkhum spoke a different dialect of the same Vainakh language. Despite this, it is still a relatively important social grouping, as seen through various Chechen authors and scholars using it in their descriptions of the Vainakh social structure, as well as its feature on the coat of arms of the Chechen Republic of Ichkeria.

== Etymology ==
The term is of foreign origin and some suggest that it comes from the old Persian word tauhma meaning "kin or tribe." Tukkhum is a term often used by North Caucasians for a tribe or family, and is found among the Dagestani peoples such as Avars, Dargins, Kumyks and Lezghins. The term is used to describe different clan structures for different ethnicities and does not mean the same thing from one ethnicity to the other. While within the traditional social structure of the Avars, Dargins and Lezgins the concept of tukkhum is synonymous with a fully fledged clan, among the Kumyks the term is applied primarily in the sense of a family.

To the Chechens, it was introduced by Mamakaev in 1962 and it has been used in Chechen historical studies ever since. It is noted by the Caucasiologist Kharadze in 1968, that Mamakaev is the basis for the Chechen use of tukkhum to make the social structure of the Chechens more complex and interesting, despite the meaning of tukkhum not being clear in the Chechen language. The famous 19th-century historian Bashir Dalgat who studied extensively the Chechen and Ingush peoples, noted that the term "tukkhum" was completely foreign to most Chechens as it was only used by some societies in the lowlands. According to him, most Chechens only referred to their teip (especially in the highlands) and never knew of or used the term "tukkhum".

Several Chechen historians and Linguists such as A. Tesaev and N. N. Albekov have criticized the term "tukkhum" and its implementation by Mamakaev. Albekov especially considers the term destructive to the Chechen nation:

Numerous studies carried out by us in the field of ethnology, history, folklore, systematology, leave no doubt that the term "tukkhum" not only was and is not part of the Chechen ethnos, but also directly contradicts the systemic structure of the Chechen people. The concept of "tukkhum" introduces a destructive chaos in the orderliness of the Chechen ethnic systems, removing dozens of Chechen teips (clans) from structural organization of the Chechen people.

— N. N. Albekov, "Antisocial nature of the term "Tukkhum" in the ethnic system of Nohchi (Chechens)"

== Proposed tukkhum system ==
The coat of arms of the Chechen Republic of Ichkeria had nine stars on it to represent each tukkhum.

According to Mamakaev there were 9 tukkhums:

1. Mälkhiy
2. Nokhchmakhkakhoy
3. Akkxiy
4. Orstkhoy
5. Terloy
6. Chantiy
7. Cheberloy
8. Sharoy
9. Shatoy

However, this has been heavily criticized as some of the tukkhums mentioned were, in fact, nothing more than large teips, with several "gar" (sub-clans). Teips such as Mälkhi and Terloy for example are traditionally two teips, consisting of several "gar". These teips have all the characteristics of a Chechen teip. Mamakaev incorrectly wrote down these large teips as "tukkhum" and their gars as teips under this tukkhum, even though they were never teips, but merely branches of that specific teip.

== Dagestani tukhums ==
The tukhum is a prominent social grouping among the Dagestani highlanders. The etymology is considered to be the same as described above. The tukhum is found in Avar, Dargin, Lezgin and Lak societies, among others. There are, however, differences from group to group in the reach of the term among the different groups. In Avar and Dargin society, the tukhum contains 200-300 members, though Dargin society has the added layer of the Jin, a smaller extended family. Within a tukhum, endogamy is practiced, vendettas are observed and there is a strong feeling of kinship. These inter-tukhum relations were managed by Adat, customary laws among the various peoples.

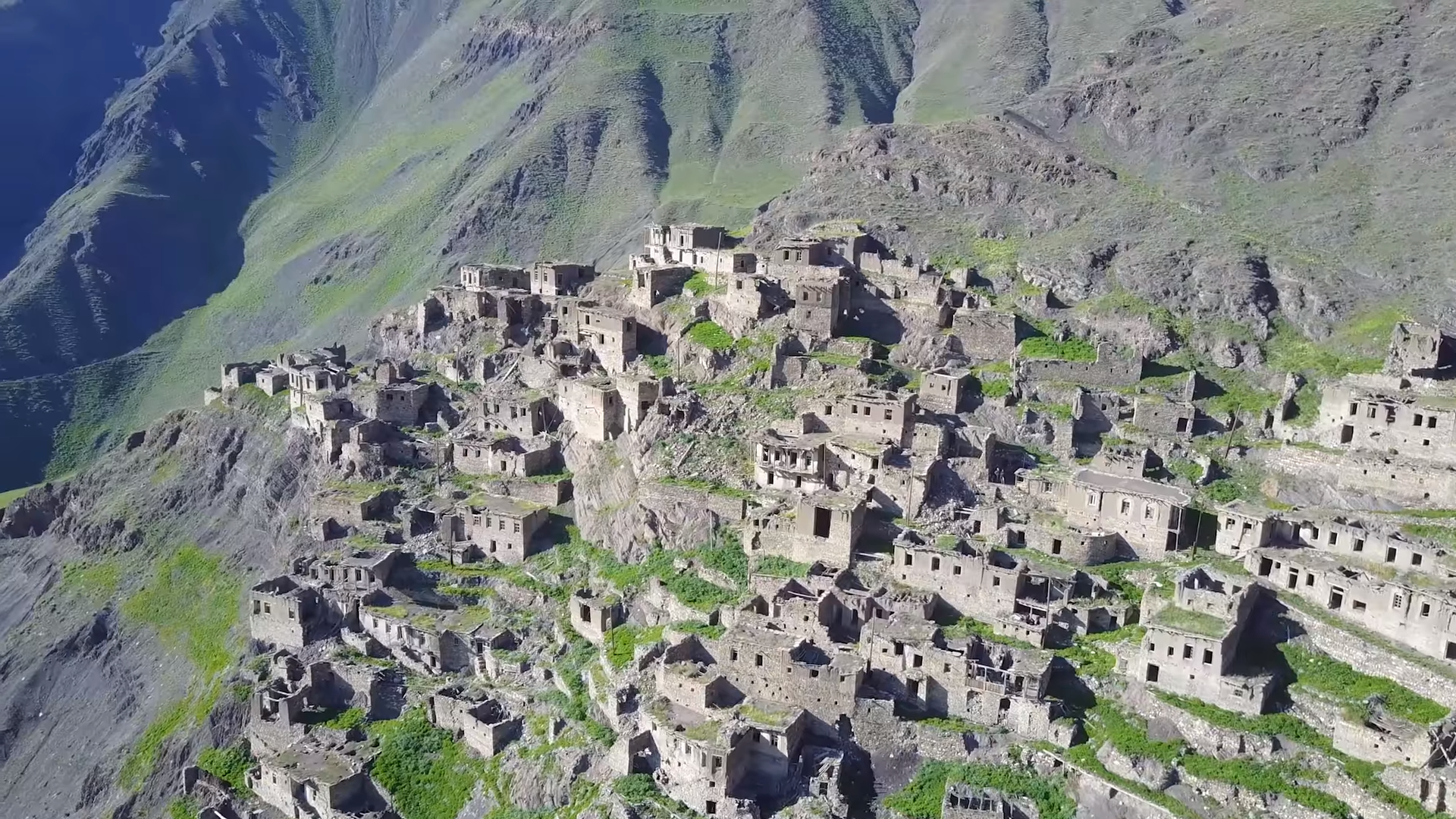
Ukhul Village, Dagestan. The Village (Aul) is the most prominent social grouping in Dagestan, with tukhums constituting the members.

As opposed to the Chechen tukkhum, which is considered as being superior to the teip, the Dagestani tukhum is almost always a subdivision of the village community, known as the aul, which is made up of one village. There are constituent organs to the aul, namely the Jamaat, or Village Council, and the Council of Elders. These too differ in size from group to group. The Avar village community usually consists of one or two auls, with more being unusual but not unheard of. The Dargin village community, meanwhile, is almost always one to two auls with between 200 and 1,000 members.

The tukhum and the aul have been the basis for Sufi Tariqa to entrench themselves in Dagestani society – rather than seeking to replace these older systems, the Tariqa exists alongside them and acts as a unifying feature. This entrenchment of the tariqa into the system of tukhums and auls created a regional variant of Sufism called Tariqatism. In contrast, Salafism and Wahhabism, which have entered the spiritual life of Dagestanis since the fall of the Soviet Union, have gained popularity in that they allow one freedom from this very system and a different sense of belonging.

=== Lezgin tukhums ===
While there is a version of the tukhum in Lezgin society, it requires elaboration. The Lezgin version of the tukhum has all but vanished. While the aul was, like the Avar and Dargin auls, the basis of Lezgin society in pre-revolutionary times, the aul and the Jamaat have lost their role. The reasons for this range from their homeland being more open to external influence, culturally from neighbouring Azeris and politically from the USSR, as well as the loss of the Lezgin Tariqa to the USSR's state atheism and the more recent penetration of Salafism into Lezgin society.

== See also ==
- Teip
- Clan
- Ethnic autonomous regions
- Kinship and descent
- Tribe
- Dagestan
- Chechnya
- Nakh peoples

== Bibliography ==
- Мамакаев, М. (1936). "Правовой институт тайпизма и процесс его разложения" [The legal institution of taipism and the process of its decomposition]. In Арсанов, С.; Мамакаев, М.; Авторханов, А. (eds.). Известия Чечено-Ингушского научно-исследовательского института [Proceedings of the Chechen-Ingush Research Institute] (in Russian). Vol. 1 (1st ed.). Грозный: Чечингиздат. pp. 55–79.
- Мамакаев, М. (1962). Чеченский тайп (род) в период его разложения [Chechen taip (bloodline) in the period of its decomposition] (in Russian) (1st ed.). Грозный: Чеч.-Инг. кн. изд-во. pp. 1–47.
- Мамакаев, М. (1973). Чеченский тайп (род) в период его разложения [Chechen taip (bloodline) in the period of its decomposition] (in Russian) (2nd ed.). Грозный: Чеч.-Инг. кн. изд-во. pp. 1–100.
