= Shatoy people =

Shatoy
Шуотой
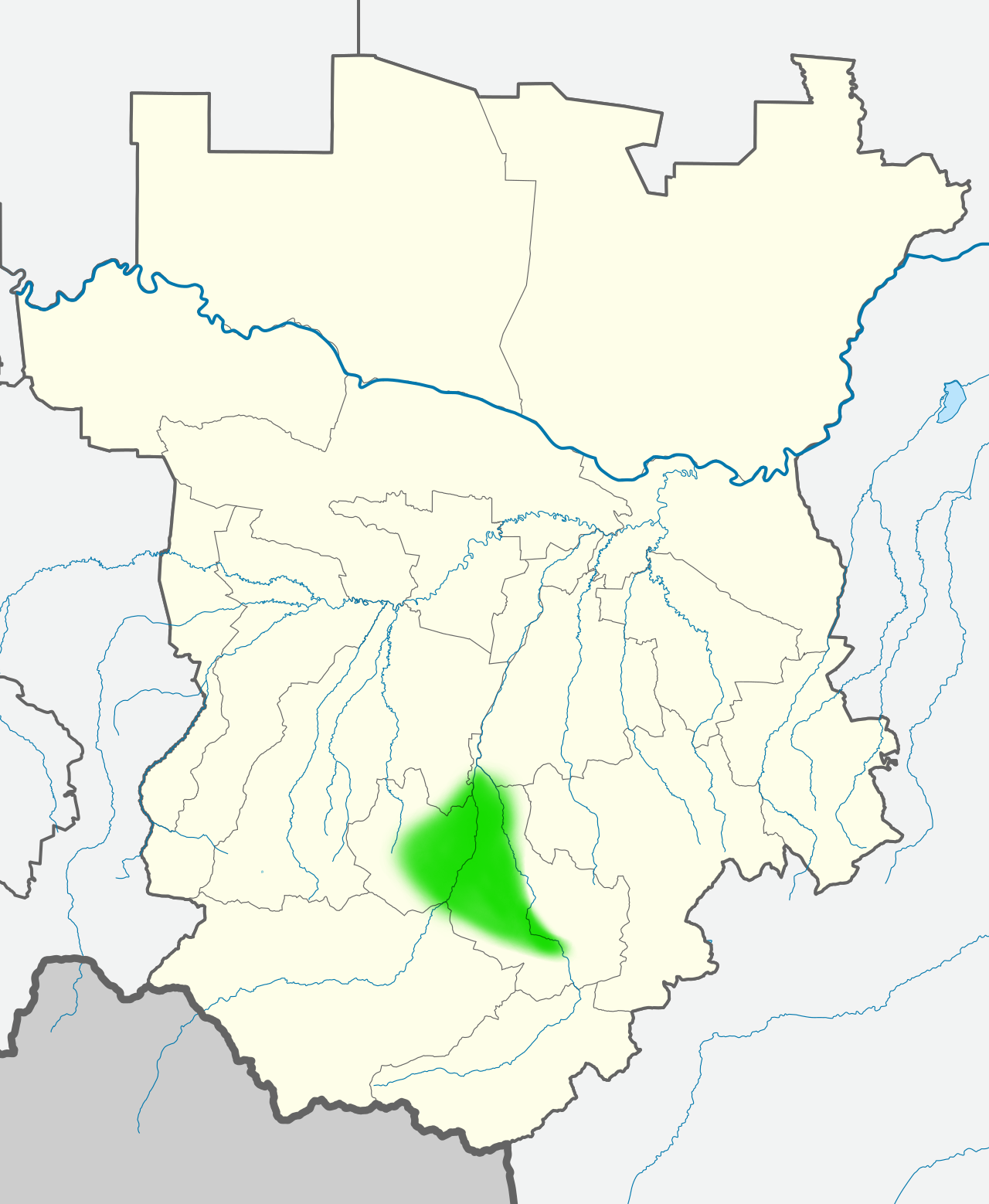
- Historical Region of the Shatoy

Total population
- 15,000 (1859)

Regions with significant populations
- Shatoysky District

Languages
- Shatoy dialect of the Chechen language

Religion
- Islam

Related ethnic groups
- Bats people

The Shatoy, (Note: Russian: Шатой; Шотой, romanized: Shatoy; Shotoy; Chechen: Шуотой, romanized: Shuotoy) historically referred to as the Shubut, Shibut, (Note: Other variants of that name include: Shubuti, al-Shubut, Chabut or Shuot) or Tshan people, are a Chechen society that is sometimes classified as a Tukkhum.

== Clans ==
The Shotoy include clans (Teip) such as:

- Khakkoy
- Nikhaloy
- Pkhamtoy
- Gattoy
- Vashandaroy
- Khalgiy
- Saettoy
- Sanoy
- Tumsoy
- Borzkhoy
- Varandoy
- Keloy

The Saarbaloy and Lashkaroy clans also consider themselves to be Shotoy.

== Settlements ==
The Shatoy region primarily comprises the following settlements: Aslanbek-Sheripovo, Greater Varanda, Lesser Varanda, Syuzhi, Borzoi, Ryadukhoy, Tumsoy, Vashindaroy, Vysokogornoye, Gorgachi, Ulus-Kert, Yaryshmardy, Dachu-Borzoi, Zony, Dai, Nikhaloy, Pamyatoi, Gush-Kert, Bekum-Kale, Vardy, Satti, Urdyukhoy, Yukerch-Keloy, Khal-Kiloy, Sanoy, Kharsenoy, Maly Kharsenoy, Shatoy, Hakkoy, among others.

Additionally, several settlements founded by the Shatoy people outside their region include Chiri-Yurt, Duba-Yurt, Selmentauzen, Starye Atagi, Alkhazurovo, Goyty, Chishki, Goy-Chu, and Goyskoe, among others.

== Religion ==
Historically, according to Georgian reports to Russian authorities, the Shibut were described as a Christian people. Additionally, two Tushetians named Astop Arabulin and Abul Astorul, who traveled to Astrakhan in 1661, stated that the Shibut shared the same faith as the Tushetians, which was Christianity, although a significant number also followed Islam. However, when Mikhail Molchanov traveled to the Shibut land in 1659 to make the Shatoy take an oath on the Bible, he was unsuccessful, stating, "...because they have no Orthodox Christians; They call themselves Orthodox Christians because they eat pork. And they were falsely represented as Christians by the Georgian Ivan Mamukin for no reason." Additionally, several Shatoy elders, including Lavarsan Yazyev and Zatyn Lavarsanov in 1627, and Algi, Anak, and Ildey in 1647, took an oath on the Quran when pledging allegiance to Russia. These contradictory reports about the religion of the Shatoy reflect the instability of Islamic beliefs among the Vainakh in the 17th century.

Today, the Shatoy people are predominantly Muslims.

== History ==
=== Origin legends ===
According to Chechen legends, the ancestors of the Vainakh were descended from a mighty hero named Nakhche, who had twelve sons. Each son settled in the Vainakh mountains, naming their respective lands after themselves. Among these twelve sons were Shubuti and Shato, who established their settlements in the Shatoy region and named after themselves.

=== Shatoy Federation ===
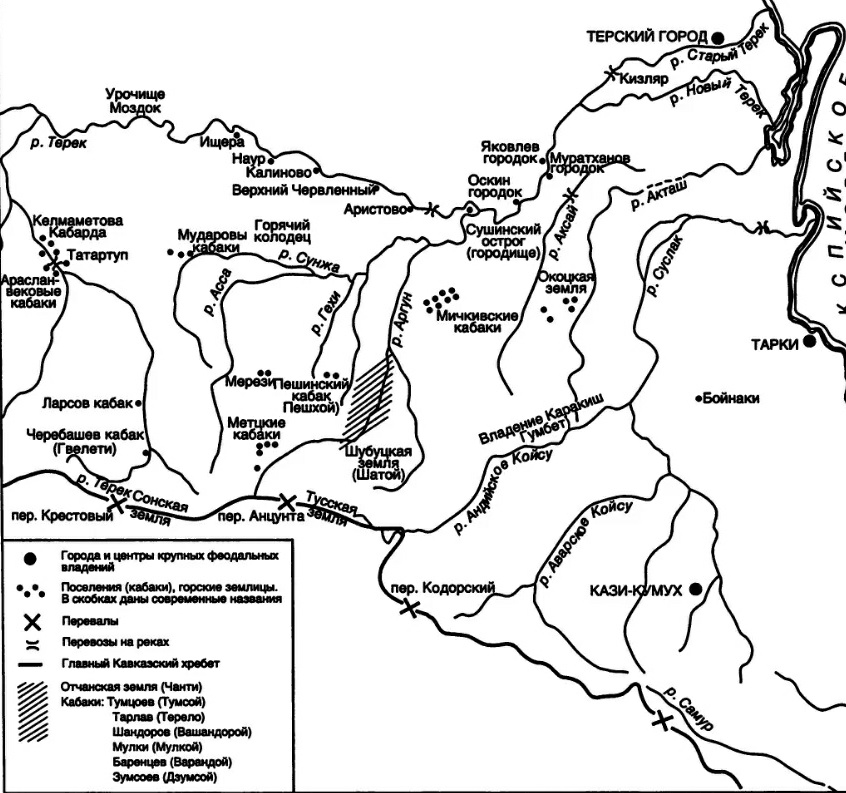
Map of the Northeastern Caucasus in the 17th century, showing the Shubut land (Shatoy)

The Shatoy Federation, also known as the Shibut Jama'at, was a federation comprising various villages and communities within the Shatoy region. Governed by elected elders and prominent leaders, it has been in existence since the medieval period.

=== First mention ===
The earliest recorded mention of the Shatoy was by a Russian embassy traveling to Georgia between 1587 and 1588. While passing through Chechen territories, the embassy referred to the "Mountainous land of Shibut".

Specific clans within the Shatoy, such as the Varandoy or Tumsoy clans, were also noted in Russian documents. In 1657, these clans sent a letter to the Russian tsar, expressing their desire to pledge allegiance (see below).

=== 17th century — 1840 ===
In 1619, Russian sources mentioned the Shatoy people as the "Tshan people". In 1627, it was reported that two Shatoy elders from a village of approximately 20 households, Lavarsan Yazyev and Zatyn Lavarsanov, pledged allegiance to Russian Tsar Mikhail I. Two years later, in 1629, Cossacks from the town of Koshlakov reported a raid by 30 fighters from the Shibut tribe.

In 1642, an individual named Alkhan Dikeev of the Shubut is mentioned, who may have been the son of Deki, one of the leaders of the assault on Koshlakov. Acting as a messenger, Alkhan brought a letter from the Georgian King Teimuraz I of Kakheti to Russian authorities on the Terek River in September 1642.

In 1647, four Shatoy villages pledged allegiance to Moscow, swearing on the Quran to cease attacks on Russian people along the Terek River. They also provided an Amanat (Note: In the Caucasus, a prince or ruler would give one or several of his children to the Russian Empire to prove their loyalty) named Kasu.

Russian documents from 1653 record an influential Shatoy man named Aydemir, who requested the replacement of his son Bisyash, held as an Amanat in the Terki Fortress for two years.

In 1658, three envoys from the "Shibut Jama'at" arrived in Moscow with a letter written in a Turkic language and Arabic script, which stated:

To the great sovereign, the Tsar's majesty, we, the Shubut Jama'at, have become vassals: Adivaranty (Varandoy clan), Chaty, Tonsya (Tumsoy clan) regions, have sent to you, the great sovereign, our three envoys, and we have become the vassals of the great sovereign. The names of these envoys were Alikhan, Suslu, and Algan, and gave an Amanat on the Terek. And we ask the great sovereign to favor us.
And we sent our envoys with Tsar Teimuraz, and Tsar Teimuraz has also become a subject of the great sovereign, and we are the vassals of the great sovereign as well. And we will bring many other mountain people under the high hand of the great sovereign. And we ask the great sovereign to grant us provisions. And we bow our heads, we, the Shubut regions, ask the great sovereign to issue a decree.

According to a document from 1661, the neighboring Tushetians ruled over the Shatoy and took tribute from them. The document also states the religion of the Shatoy (See Religion of the Shatoy).

And they (the Tushetians) rule over the Shibut land, and their faith is the same (Christianity), but some Shibuts also live according to Muslim customs. And the Tushetians take tribute from the Shibuts, around 10 sheep per village.

However, as mentioned abvove, the reports about the Shatoy religion turned out to be false.

==== Kazy Khan ====
Kazy Khan served as a Qadi (Shari'ah judge) for the Shatoy people in the 18th century. He also acted as a negotiator between the Turlov Senior Prince, Alibek Khasbulatov, and the Safawid Empire from 1742 to 1743. In 1762, he reportedly pledged allegiance to the Russian Empire.

=== As part of the Imamate (1840 — 1858) ===
In March 1840, delegations from across Chechnya gathered in Urus-Martan to pledge allegiance to Imam Shamil, including a delegation from the Shatoy society. The Shatoy were subsequently incorporated into the Lesser Chechnya Naibdom.
Following this wave of pledges, additional delegations from the Northeastern Caucasus joined Shamil, leading to a widespread uprising throughout the region.

In the fall of 1843, Lesser Chechnya was divided into several districts, including the Shatoy Naibdom, which comprised 12 settlements.
In December 1851, Shamil appointed Batuko of Shatoy as the Naib of the Shatoy province. According to an 1856 map, the Shatoy Naibdom could muster a total of 500 troops, consisting of 300 infantry and 200 cavalry. In the event of full mobilization, this number could increase to 1,000 infantry and cavalry.

However, after several decades of continuous warfare with the Russian Empire, the Chechens became demoralized and lost the will to fight for the Imamate. Consequently, in 1858, when General Evdokimov occupied the Chechen plains and launched a campaign into the Argun Gorge, Russian troops encountered little resistance and swiftly conquered the gorge and the Shatoy people.

According to the 1859 statistics on Teips and societies, the Shatoy population numbered around 15,000 in that year, and it was noted that they were conquered in 1858.

=== Chronology ===
Chronology of the history of the Shatoy tribe and their region:

- Middle Ages: A federation of the Shatoy people gets established
- 1587–1588: First written mention of the Shatoy. They are mentioned as the "Mountainous land of the Shibut" by a Russian embassy travelling to Georgia.
- 1619: Russian sources mention the "Tshan people", who are attributed to the Shatoy.
- 1627: Two Shatoy elders pledge allegiance to Russia.
- 1628: Shatoy fighters raid the Cossack town Koshlakov.
- 1629: Report of the Terki administration to the Russian Tsar about the hostile behaviour of the Shatoy.
- 1642: Shatoy messenger, Alkhan Dikeev transports a message from the Georgian king to Russian authorities on the Terek.
- 1647: Four Shatoy villages pledge allegiance to Russia.
- 1651: Aydemir, an important leader of the Shatoy, pledges allegiance to Russia.
- 1657: The Tumsoy, Varandoy and other clans pledge allegiance to Russia.
- 18th century: Kazy Khan, the Qadi/Judge of the Shatoy is mentioned as the ruler of the Shatoy.
- 1840: The Shatoy pledge allegiance to Imam Shamil.
- 1843: The Shatoy Naibdom gets established.
- 1851–1858: Batuko of Shatoy governs the Shatoy Naibdom.
- 1858: The Shatoy Naibdom is conquered by the Russian Empire.

== Notable people ==
- Lavarsan Yazyev and Zatyn Lavarsanov: Father and son; Elders of a village with 20 households, pledged allegiance to the Tsardom of Russia in 1627.
- Araslan and Deki: Led the Assault on Koshlakov; may have been influential leaders.
- Alkhan Dikeev: May have been the son of the former; Messenger of the Georgian king Teimuraz I of Kakhetia.
- Algi, Anak and Ildey: Governors of the villages Barantsev, Tumtsuev, Shandorov and Uyshev. Pledged allegiance to Russia in 1647.
- Aydemir: A "leading" figure of the Shatoy, pledged allegiance to Russia in the 17th century.
- Alikhan: An honorary representative of the Shatoy Federation. Pledged allegiance to Russia in 1657.
- Kazy Khan: Qadi (judge) of the Shatoy; According to some documents, the ruler of the Shatoy Federation. He was also a negotiator for the Turlovs and pledged allegiance to Russia in 1762.
- Batuko of Shatoy: Naib and loyal supporter of Imam Shamil, governor of the Shatoy Naibdom
- Uvays Mazhidovich Akhtayev: Basketball player in the USSR national basketball team
- Degi Bagayev: Honored wrestling coach of the USSR

== See also ==
- Tukkhum — Chechen societies; One of them being Shatoy
- Koshlakov Raid — Raid on a Cossack town by Shatoy fighters
- Kazy Khan — 18th-century Shatoy Qadi
- Shatoy Naibdom — District of the Caucasian Imamate
- Batuko of Shatoy — One of the governors of the Shatoy Naibdom
