= Chechen art =

Overview of the art of Chechnya

Chechen art is the historical and present art form representing Chechnya or the Chechen Republic. This type of art is a part of Chechnya's tangible cultural heritage, showing its deep history. Being formed centuries ago, Chechen art has been dated back to the Early Bronze Age. Chechens have used art to express their culture, beliefs, customs, and history. An important message shown in this art are Chechen religious beliefs, especially in their rituals and legends. Like in many other ancient cultures, Chechen decor is shown with symbols idealizing their everyday life and roles, such as hunting, farming, and religious rituals.

== History ==
Whether looking at Chechen art in the Bronze Age or the present, there is still a strong Eastern influence with other groups, including Muslims and Russians. In the era of the early Bronze Age, Chechen artifacts found were pottery, ceramics, obviously, bronze and metal objects. Chechen people would carve symbols in these ceramics and pottery, mainly of animals which were then used in rituals. Other works of carving symbols was done in the late Bronze Age to the late Middle Ages. Painting hadn't taken much place in Chechen art until 1917. With all the beautiful and vast forms of art this culture had created, many were displayed in the Grozny Museum, having a total of 3,270 works and 950 paintings. After the First Chechen War, with the bombing of Grozny in 1995, most of the Chechen art within the museum was destroyed, with only 100 paintings saved. Since then, many artists and historians are trying to restore many of these paintings, and making exhibits for them in Moscow. With a country full of history, culture and war, it is resembled in Chechen art.

== Chechen artists ==
Pyotr Zakharov was the first famous painter in Chechen art, being very popular within the 1800s. He became popular for his work in self portraits, painting many celebrities in St. Petersburg, Russia. Another famous Chechen artist was Arbi Rassukhanov (1953 – 2000) a Soviet painter of Chechen origin, best known for his portraits, typical of the Realism style. Arbi Rassukhanov's style can be characterized as a form of realism focused on depicting Chechen women and aspects of Chechen life. Amandi Asukhanov is being known for his painting landscapes in the late 1900s. Lastly, Zamir Yushayev, who is a more recent painter of Chechen art. He specializes in several media, but mainly painting and oil, and is also a cartoonist.
