= Koshlakov Raid =

1628 conflict in Koshlakov town

Date	28 September 1628
Location	Koshlakov town
Result	Chechen victory

Belligerents
Shatoy Federation; Merzhoy	Cossacks of Koshlakov

Commanders and leaders
Araslan; Deki	Ataman Kuzem Lukov

Strength
~30	Unknown

Casualties and losses
None	Heavy: Many people KIA, WIA and POW; Many horses and other livestock captured

The Koshlakov Raid was an assault on the town of Koshlakov by Chechen highlanders from the Shatoy tribe, resulting in a victory for the raiders.

== History ==
=== Events ===
In the year 1627, two elders from a village with 20 households from the Shubut Confederation, (Note: Commonly known as the Shatoy/Shotoy. Known in Chechen as the Shuotoy) Lavarsan Yazyev and Zatyn Lavarsanov (apparently father and son) took an oath on the Quran in the Terki Fortress (As Terki was the Russian "capital" of the Caucasus at that time) to Tsar Mikhail I to remain loyal to the Tsardom of Russia, not attack Russian settlements and give 4 kuly (approx. 1300 litres) (Note: An old Russian unit of measurement. The exact amount of a kul may differ, but it's estimated to be between 200–400 litres.) of honey annually as a tax.

Despite that however, a year later, on the 28th of September 1628, two men from the Shatoy tribe by the names Araslan and Deki, together with 30 fighters, launched an assault on the Cossack town of Koshlakov. According to the report, they killed many and wounded several others and captured many horses and other livestock. They also took several hostages.
Although the Shatoy people had violated their oath, Russian authorities urged the Terki administration not to respond with force and instead try to get the hostages back by negotiations. The cautiousness of the Russian authorities may indicate that Araslan and Deki were influential personalities among their people.

Additionally, according to the report, Lavarsan and Zatyn had also broken their oath, as they did not pay the agreed annual tribute and also conducted attacks on Russian and Cossack settlements.

=== Original report ===
The information on the attack was given by a Greben Cossack man by the name Ivash Grigoriev Sadovnikov, who was sent by Ataman (Note: Ataman is a title for a Cossack chief, captain, commander or ruler) Kuzem Lukov. He travelled to the Terki Fortress. In the letter to the Russian Tsar Mikhail I, written by the governors of the Terek Fortress, Prince Ivash Dashkov and Bogdash Priklonsky, it says:

To the sovereign Tsar and Grand Prince Mikhail Fyodorovich of all Russia, your humble servants Ivashko Dashkov and Bogdashko Priklonskoye bow their heads to you.

In the current year, 137 (1629 AD), (Note: Based on the Byzantine calendar. As mentioned, in the Gregorian calendar that year corresponds to 1629) on October 4th, from the Terek, from the town of Koshlakov, came the Greben Cossack Ivashko Grigoriev Sadovnikov, sent by Ataman Kuzemka Lukovka. During the interrogation, he told us that on September 28th, people from the Shibut tribe (Shatoy tribe), led by Araslanko and Dekitko, with about 30 men, attacked their town (Koshlakov). They killed many people, wounded others, and drove away horses and other livestock. Furthermore, those Shibut people had previously attacked your Majesty's people and raided towns.

We, your humble servants, called upon Prince Sholokh of Cherkassk and asked him if there were any hostages (Note: In the Caucasus, rulers or princes would give one or more of their children to the Russian Empire as a sign of their loyalty. These "hostages" were called Amanat.) from the Shibut people in the Terek town and if these Shibut people had sworn an oath to serve you, the great sovereign Tsar and Grand Prince Mikhail Fyodorovich of all Russia, and not to kill your Majesty's people.

Prince Sholokh of Cherkassk told us that there were no hostages from the Shibut tribe in the Terek town. He also mentioned that the Shibut people, Lavarsanko Yazyev and Zatyshko Lavarsanov, with a village with about 20 households, had sworn in the year 135 (1627 AD) to serve you, the great sovereign Tsar and Grand Prince Mikhail Fyodorovich of all Russia, to pay an annual tribute of four kuly of honey, and not to harm or rob your majesty's people. However, these Shibut people, Lavarsanko and Zatyshko, have broken their oath, stopped paying the tribute, and continue attacking your majesty's people and besieging the Cossack town.

We, your humble servants, do not dare to send your majesty's soldiers against this disobedient Shibut tribe without your sovereign decree. We await your instructions on how to proceed.
