= Arbi Rassukhanov =

Russian painter

- Born: 19 October 1953 village Utenai Taldy, Kazakh Soviet Socialist Republic, Soviet Union
- Died: 2000; Chechen Republic
- Resting place: Shali, Chechen Republic
- Citizenship: Russia
- Education: Saint Petersburg Repin Academy of Arts (1984)
- Known for: portrait paintings
- Notable work: Chechen woman (1995)
- Movement: Realism

Arbi Rassukhanov (1953 – 2000) was a Soviet painter of Chechen origin, best known for his portraits, typical of the Realism style. Arbi Rassukhanov's style can be characterized as a form of realism focused on depicting Chechen women and aspects of Chechen life.

== Biography ==
The artist was born on October 19, 1953, in the village of Utenai Taldy, Kazakh Soviet Socialist Republic, Soviet Union. His historical homeland is the city of Shali, Chechen Republic. He lived and worked in Grozny. Since 1990, he has been a member of the Artists Trade Union of Russia.

From 1972 to 1984, he studied at the Repin Institute of Arts. He graduated from the workshop of Professor Yuri Neprintsev. His diploma thesis was Chechen-Ingush Women.

He was one of the Chechen Republic's leading painters. A talented colorist, he worked in landscape, portrait, and narrative thematic works dedicated to the Caucasus . His most famous work, Chechen woman, is still considered as his notable artwork and can be viewed on art websites like Arthive. Many of Rassukhanov's paintings were created in the mid-1990s, during the First Chechen War, and reflect the harsh realities of that period, when much of the country's cultural heritage was destroyed. In a painting titled War, for example, he depicts the grim and tragic subject matter with directness, similar to how Russian abstract art artists depicted contemporary social conditions. Works like Portrait of a woman and his portraits of women in traditional dress show a strong connection to Chechen culture. By focusing on traditional themes, Rassukhanov documented and preserved aspects of his cultural identity through his art. Rassukhanov also used realist technique to explore the lives of ordinary people in a nuanced and empathetic manner.

He participated in numerous art exhibitions. The majority of his works were destroyed in the 1990s during the First Chechen War. In 1995, in his interview with the Swiss newspaper Neue Zürcher Zeitung he mentioned that some of his works, which were in the collection of the National Museum of the Chechen Republic, had been lost during this time.

At the end of 1995, at the request of Arbi Rassukhanov and with the authorization of the Ministry of Culture of the Chechen Republic, 62 of his works were brought to Germany, 32 of them were donated to private collectors in Germany, Greece, Iran, Spain, France, Switzerland, and the United States. In 2024, a private art collector from Germany returned 25 artworks of Arbi Rassukhanov to the Chechen Republic and donated them to the A.A. Kadyrov State Gallery and the National Museum of the Chechen Republic. Arbi Abdulkarimovich Rassukhanov died in 2000.

== Sources ==
- "Who's Who in the Chechen Republic", 1994, p.87 (rus.)
- Artist Arbi Rassukhanov,Neue Zürcher Zeitung, 1995 (gem.)

== See also ==
- Chechen art
