= Kazy Khan =

Kazy Khan was an 18th–century Chechen Qadi (Judge in Sharia law) from the Shatoy tribe, and, according to some documents, the ruler of the Shatoy Federation. He was also a negotiator and messenger to Nader Shah.

== Biography ==
During that period, Chechen villages typically had Mullahs; larger villages would have multiple Mullahs and a Qadi (Judge). Kazy Khan served as the Qadi of Shatoy people and, according to some historical records, was the ruler of the Shatoy Federation.
One document from the 18th century states: «The Chabutli people (Shatoy) do not have any owners, they carry out justice and execution through their Qadi».

In the North Caucasus, the Hajjis, Mullahs, and Qadis were responsible not only for adjudicating according to Sharia law but also for drafting correspondence to Tsarist authorities and often leading negotiations. During the negotiations between the Turlov Principality under Alibek Khasbulatov and the Safavid Empire under Nader Shah, it was Kazy Khan of Shatoy who represented the Chechen side.

Kazy Khan visited Nader Shah twice. During the first visit, Nader Shah gifted him 50 rubles, and the six elders accompanying him received 25 rubles each.
On his second visit, Kazy Khan, along with Alisultan Khasbulatov and three elders, secured an agreement. Kazy Khan received 200 rubles, Alisultan received 150 rubles, and the elders received 25 rubles each.

In 1762, a document records that "Shuban owner Kaziy and his son Madji" were invited to Kizlyar, where they pledged allegiance to Russia. This was the last historical mention of Kazy Khan.

== See also ==
- Shatoy people — Kazy's tribe
- Alibek Khasbulatov — Turlov prince for whom Kazy negotiated with the Safawids
- Alisultan Khasbulatov — Turlov prince for whom Kazy negotiated with the Safawids
