= Veappii =

Chechen clan

ваьппий
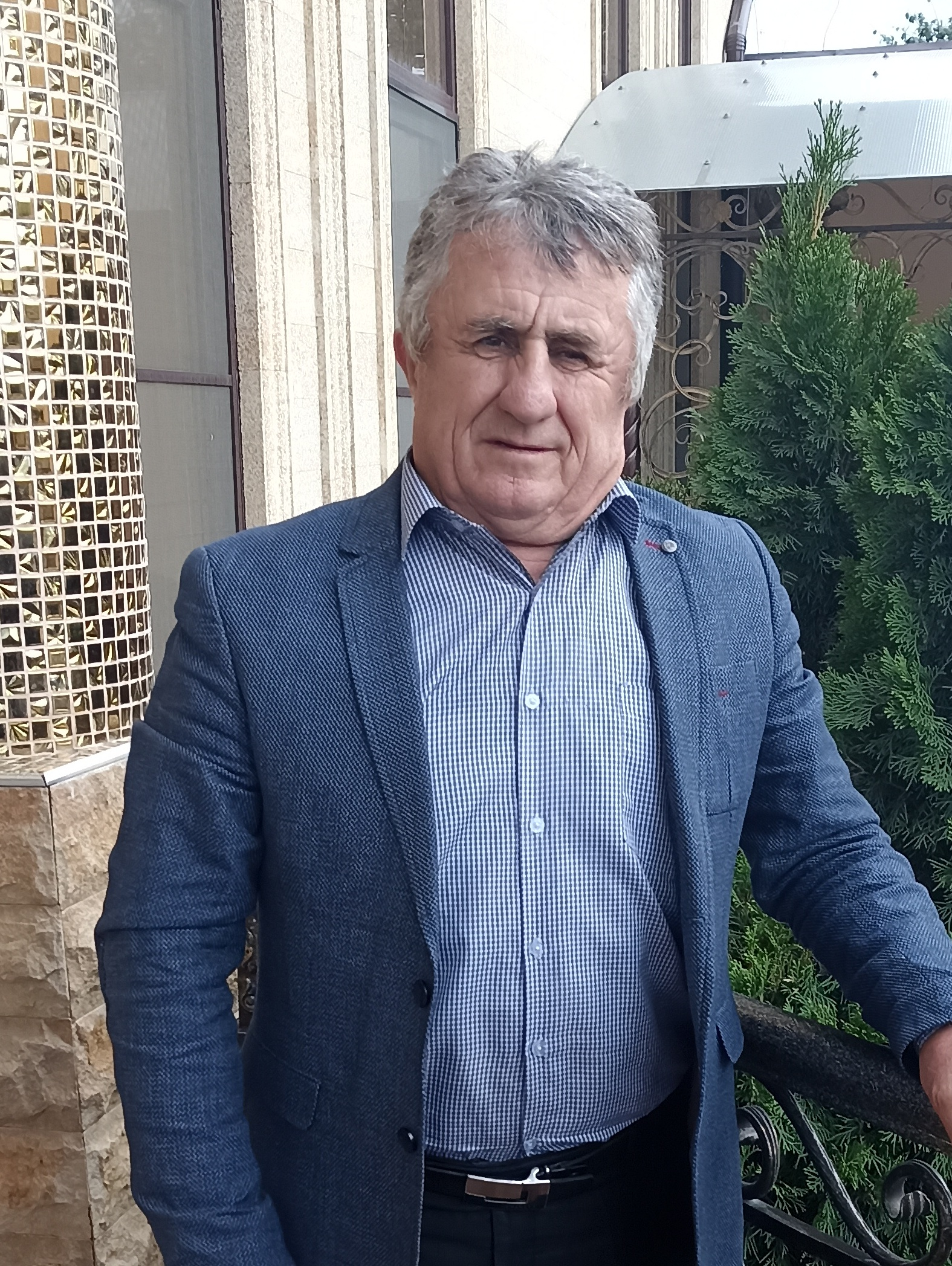
- Representative of the clan, Latip Shaipov, People's Artist of the Republic of Dagestan, sings in Chechen, as well as in Kumyk and Russian.

Regions with significant populations
- Russia: Unknown
- Dagestan: Unknown

Languages
- Chechen language

Religion
- Islam

Veappii (Chechen: ваьппий) is a Chechen clan (teip) of Ingush descent, which inhabits Aukh, a region in modern-day Dagestan. The cultural center of the Veappii was Erzi, located in Ingushetia. During the 17th and 18th centuries, they migrated from Ingushetia to Aukh. According to their teptar, they originated from the mountainous aul of Tyarsh. The Veappii were renowned for their skills as blacksmiths and craftsmen. Veappii speak the Pkharchoi dialect of the Aukh dialect of the Chechen language.

== Sources ==
- Dadaeva, A. I. (2005). Magomedov, A. G. (ed.). Фонетические особенности аккинского диалекта чеченского языка: дис. на соиск. учёной степ. канд. филол. наук: 10. 02. 02 [Phonetic features of the Akkin dialect of the Chechen language: a dissertation for the degree of candidate of philological sciences] (in Russian). Makhachkala: Dagestani Scientific Center of RAS. pp. 1–172, 1–5.
- Ibragimov, M.-R. A. (2002). "Чеченцы" [Chechens]. In Arutyunov, S. A.; Osmanov, A. I.; Sergeeva, G. A. (eds.). Народы Дагестана [Peoples of Dagestan] (PDF). Narody i kultyury (in Russian). Moscow: Nauka. pp. 460–472. ISBN 5-02-008808-0.
- Ibragimov, M.-R. A. (2006). "Чеченцы Дагестана: этнодемографическая история и современность" [Chechens of Dagestan: ethnodemographic history and modernity]. In Ibragimov, Kh. I.; Tishkov, V. A.; Osmaev, A. D.; Ustinova, M. Ya. (eds.). Чеченская Республика и чеченцы: история и современность [Chechen Republic and Chechens: history and modernity] (in Russian). Moscow: Nauka. pp. 186–194. ISBN 5-02-034016-2.
- Nataev, S. A. (2015). "К вопросу об этносоциальной структуре Чечни в XVIII-XIX вв.(по данным этнонимики и фольклора чеченцев)" [To the question of the ethno-social structure of Chechnya in the XVIII-XIX centuries (according to the ethnonymy and folklore of the Chechens)]. Teoriya I Praktika Obshchestvennogo Razvitiya (in Russian) (21). Khors: 170–173. eISSN 2072-7623. ISSN 1815-4964.
- Общенациональная Комиссия по рассмотрению вопросов, связанных с определением территории и границ Ингушетии (2021). Всемирный конгресс ингушского народа (ed.). Доклад о границах и территории Ингушетии (общие положения) [Report on the borders and territory of Ingushetia (general provisions)] (archival documents, maps, illustrations) (in Russian). Назрань. pp. 1–175.
- Zyazikov, M. M. (2004). Традиционная культура ингушей: история и современность [Traditional culture of the Ingush: history and modernity] (in Russian). Rostov-Na-Donu: SKNTs VSh. pp. 1–312. ISBN 5-87872-302-6.
