= Cheberloyevsky District =

District (raion) of Chechnya

Cheberloyevsky District (Chechen: ЧӀебарлойн кӀошт; Russian: Чеберлоевский район) is a district (raion) of Chechnya. The district was recreated in 2012. However, the official restoration process of the district is not complete. The district also existed between 1926 and 1944. The administrative center is the village of Sharo-Argun (Chechen: Шара-Орга).

== Location ==
Location of Cheberloyevsky District, Chechnya (map with pre-2018 republic borders)

Outline map of Cheberloyevsky District

Cheberloyevsky District is located in the south-east of Chechnya. It shares borders with Vedensky District in the north, Shatoysky District in the west, Itum-Kalinsky District in the south-west, Sharoysky District in the south, and Dagestan to the east.

== History ==
On 8 March 1926, Cheberloyevsky District was first formed, as a part of the Chechen Autonomous Oblast, along with 13 other districts. The administrative center of the district was in the village of Makazhoy at that time. According to the 1926 census, there were 13,053 people living in Cheberloyevsky District, in 11 selsoviets.

In February 1929, Cheberloyevsky District was disbanded during a consolidation of districts. Its territory became part of the Vedensky and Shatoysky districts.

On 10 January 1932, a Sharo-Cheberloyevsky District was informally created, within the same territory as the former Cheberloyevsky District. The administrative center was located in the village of Dai at that time. It was restored formally as Cheberloyevsky District in 1935, as a part of the Chechen-Ingush ASSR. The administrative center was again changed at this time to Sharo-Argun.

As of 31 December 1940, the district included over 160 settlements, with a population of more than 17,000 people.

On 23 February 1944, the district was abandoned after the deportation of Vaynakhs. The district was then disbanded and its territory became part of the Vedensky and Shatoysky districts, as well as a part joining the Botlikhsky District of the Dagestan ASSR.

On 9 January 1957, the Chechen-Ingush ASSR was restored. However, former residents of Cheberloyevsky District were unable to return to the area as it was "closed for living". The reason for this remains unclear. The district itself was not restored at this time.

In 1992, the district was again restored by the government of the self-proclaimed Chechen Republic of Ichkeria in its pre-1944 borders. However, it was once again disbanded in 1997 and the district borders returned to those from pre-1992.

In 2012, Cheberloyevsky District was recreated. In 2014, the district was restored for a third time, under the constitution of the Chechen Republic.

The population of the district according to the 1939 census was 16,962 people. This included Chechens (the majority at 95.7%), Russians (1.6%), Ukrainians (0.3%), and Ingush (0.2%), as well as other minority groups.

== Administrative divisions ==
Before 1944, Cheberloyevsky District was one of the largest and most densely populated districts in the Chechen-Ingush ASSR. Over 160 villages existed in the district, subordinated to 11 village councils (selsoviets). The administrative center of each selsoviet is included in brackets.

- Achaloysky (Achaloy)
- Daisky (Dai)
- Kharkaroysky (Kharkaroy)
- Makazhoysky (Makazhoy)
- Nezheloysky (Nezheloy)
- Noxchi-Keloysky (Noxchi-Keloy)
- Rigakhoysky (Rigakhoy)
- Sadoysky (Sadoy)
- Selberoysky (Selberoy)
- Sharo-Argunsky (Sharo-Argun)
- Tsikaroysky (Tsikaroy)

== District restoration process ==
Since 2014, efforts have been made to revive the district. Several settlements have been rebuilt and people have been allowed to return to the area. 212 people live in Sharo-Argun, with several other settlements also now inhabited once again.
