= Battle of Khachara (1667) =

1667 military conflict in Chechnya

Date	1667
Location	Khachara Gorge, Chechnya
Result	the borders have not changed

Belligerents
Chechens	Avar Khanate

Commanders and leaders
Aldaman Gheza	Mohammed Khan; Atanasil Husayn †

Strength
Less than a 1,000	372- 700,

Casualties and losses
210	Heavy (half of the army)

The Battle of Khachara was a confrontation between Chechens and the Avar Khanate led by Mohammad Khan. The battle took place in the Khachara gorge in the Avar Khanate during the 17th century.

== Background ==
According to the Chechen historian Amin Tesaev, the Avar khan Dugri was provoked by the Muscovy Tsar to invade Chechnya due to Chechens forcing heavy taxes on Russian ambassadors that traveled through Georgia, an important ally to Russia at the time. However, the Avar writers of the 17th century claim this expedition was a religious Jihad to convert the "infidel Chechens" to Islam. 19th century Russian-German historian and officer Vasily Potto mentions the famous Chechen folktale where it's claimed that the invasion happened due to the fertile and rich lands of the lowland Chechens. However, in the folktale, the invaders are referred as "Tavlins", an ethnonym of Turkic origin used to primarily refer to Avars. Only the Avar reports from the 17th century by the scientist Malla-Muhammad give an actual date of the battle and exact location.

== Battle ==
Malla-Muhammad mentions famous Avar chronicler such as Atanasil Husayn as taking part in the command of the army alongside the son of the Avar khan Dugri named Muhammad Khan. Malla-Muhammad describes how the Avar army gathered in their capital, Khunzakh, and marched to the Chechen mountains. He notes that they spread Islam successfully at first until they reached the Khachara gorge where the "Chechen infidels" gave the Avar army a fierce battle which killed Atanas Husayn. Chechen folklore also refers to this battle and describes how the Chechens under the command of the Mehk-Da Aldaman-Gheza managed to trick the Avar army into a mountainous pass by feinting a retreat. This description is similar to the A. P. Berzhe description of the battle where a Highland army descended into the lowlands but was tricked into the Argun gorge by the enemy that feinted a retreat. Berzhe also describes how half of the Highlander (Avar) army was exterminated and how Chechens as a result of this battle developed a saying to evoke the idea of a huge number of worthless things: "it is cheaper than Tavlin (Avar) hats in the Argun."

== See also ==
- Lekianoba
