= Magomet Mamakaev =

- Born: December 29, 1910; Achkhoy-Martan, Terek Oblast, Russian Empire
- Died: August 2, 1973 (aged 62); Grozny, Checheno-Ingush ASSR, RSFSR, Soviet Union
- Occupations: Poet, writer
- Writing career
- Language: Chechen language
- Notable awards: Order of the Red Banner of Labour

Magomet Mamakaev (29 December [O.S. 16 December] 1910 – 2 August 1973) was a Chechen poet, prose writer, publicist and literary critic. He is one of the founders of the modern Chechen literature.

== Biography ==
Magomet Mamakaev was born on 16 December 1910, in the Chechen village Achkhoy-Martan to a peasant family. At the age of ten he became an orphan. His childhood pain of loss, sorrow and pleasure are reflected in his poem "Conversation with mother" (1934). In his youth Mamakaev was a Komsomol member and studied in Moscow at Communist University of the Toilers of the East. The outlook of that period was reflected in its first literary works: "Morning over Argun", "Swallow", "Pondar" and lyric epic poem "Bloody mountains" (1928).

On pages of magazine "Revolution and the mountaineer", he argued with authorities of that time concerning description of history of the Chechen Republic during the period of the Civil War in the North Caucasus. He underlined in the articles the role of Russian intelligentsia in formation of the Chechen literature and art, value of rapprochement of cultures of Russians and Chechens. Mamakaev's work in the Communist Party, Soviet bodies of Checheno-Ingushetia, in newspapers "Groznensky worker", "the Lenin way" was connected with the Enlightenment. He organised publishing of the Chechen language political and literary art magazines. Mamakaev was not only a popular writer, but also a recognised authority in Checheno-Ingushetia. He edited books of poetry, literary almanacs, magazines, participated in preparation of the anthology of Chechen-Ingush poetry. In 1967, Mamakaev published a novel about the Chechen abrek Zelimkhan, which "aestheticizes violence through the lexicon of transgressive sanctity." Mamakaev's role in formation of the modern Chechen literature has earned him the reputation of a major figure in the cultural history of the Chechen Republic.

== Notes ==
- Rebecca Ruth Gould, "Topographies of Anticolonialism: The Ecopoetical Sublime in the Caucasus from Tolstoy to Mamakaev," Comparative Literature Studies, Vol. 50, No. 1, pp. 87–107, 2013.
