= Aldaman Gheza =

Chechen 17th-century feudal lord

Feudal lord
- Reign: 17th century
- Father: Aldam/Oaldam
- Religion: Islam

Aldaman Gheza (Note: Chechen: Алдаман ГӀеза, romanized: Aldaman Ġeza; Ingush: Оалдама Гӏаьза, romanized: Oaldama Gheaza; Russian: Гази Алдамов, romanized: Gazi Aldamov) was a Chechen feudal lord that lived in the Chebarla (Cheberloy) region of Chechnya in the 17th century. He is a prominent figure in the region, Chechen and Ingush folklores, and celebrated as a hero that protected the Chechen borders from foreign invasions. For example, the victory at the Battle of Khachara is attributed to him as he supposedly led the Chechen forces in the battle against Avar Khanate.

== Early life ==
Gheza, son of Aldam, was born in the highlands of Chebarla, Chechnya, and belonged to the powerful Makazho clan. In his youth, he was known as a courageous and noble warrior, which is glorified in the Chechen-Ingush illi (heroic songs). According to these illi's, his father, Aldam, was treacherously killed when Gheza was only nine years old. At the age of thirteen, Gheza avenged his father, made his first serious "hunting raid" against the enemy and rescued his bride, Zaz (Yazbik) Anzorova, from the hands of foreign owners and subsequently married her. According to Cheberloy folktale, Aldam is said to have founded the village of Makazhoy.

== Administration ==
The growing popularity of Gheza brought him to the Mehk-Khetasho (National Assembly) as one of the representatives of Cheberloy. Somewhere in the 1630s or 1640s, Gheza was invited to Mozaroy, Nashkha and was appointed as the Head of Chebarloy on Mount Erda-Kort. From this moment on, Gheza began his active political and administrative activities. First of all, as noted by the Chechen ethnographer and historian I. M. Saidov, he organized measures to strengthen the Chechen borders.

Gheza immediately began to strengthen the lands of Cheberloy as he built several fortifications, including the stronghold Aldam-Ghezakov in his home town Makazha, which was located on a strategic trading route in the mountains. The old stronghold of Khoy was also fortified and Cheberloy as a whole was reorganized and reinforced by several warriors from Nashkha (West Chechnya) and Ichkeria (South East Chechnya). These actions deterred any raids or invasions and soon gained attention from foreign powers. In 1649, the Russian governors along the Terek river reported that "in the mountains there is a special land called Cheburdy (Chebarloy) with over 40 settlements and the owners of that land are called Aldamov's children".

== Political career ==
Gheza concluded several treaties and alliances with local powerful lords in Dagestan. In the 1650s, the Turlov princes from Gumbet allied themselves with the Chechens under Gheza. This alliance was mainly anti-Iranian (and their vassals), the treaty was signed by Gheza himself. The Turlovs were allowed to settle near the Argun Gorge in Central Chechnya and Gheza was gifted two fortifications in the Gumbet lands. The descendants of Gheza settled in these lands and became powerful Lords in Kedy, Dagestan. They were known as the Aldamilal Nutsals who ruled the Unkratl-Chamalal regions in Dagestan and parts of Sharoi-Chebarloi, Chechnya. Another treaty was signed in 1651 with the grandsons of the famous Kumyk prince Sultan Mut. Gheza also visited the Russian Terek governors with a Chechen delegation and signed several deals with them. All these treaties and alliances were concluded to thwart Iranian encroachment in Northeast Caucasus.

According to folklore one of the most influential leaders of Chechnya during this time was Tinavin-Visa from clan Tsentaroy, who acted as the Mehk-Da (Leader of the Nation). Gheza worked closely with Visa in defending the Chechen borders against Kumyks and Kalmyks. According to folklore, in 1654 the Kalmyk Khan-Surgot was expelled from Chechnya and a peace treaty was signed. Subsequently, Visa resigned as Mehk-Da and Gheza took his place. After the expulsion of the Kalmyks, Gheza started to fortify and strengthen strategic defenses of Chechnya. According to the Chechen historian Amin Tesaev during this time a part of the Shubut tribe (Shatoy) had started to pledge allegiance to Russia and wanted to become its subjects in 1657–1661. The rest of the Chechen societies that were independent and loyal to the Mehk-Khel were strongly opposed to this. Gheza and the surrounding societies put pressure on the leaders of Shubut, who eventually yielded and went back on their deal with Russia. This hindered Russian politics in Chechnya, as was seen in 1665, when the Russian ally King Irakli of Georgia had to pay a large sum of tax to go through the Chechen lands on his way to Terek.

== Military career ==
In 1667, the Russian Tsar provoked the Avar Khan Dugri to launch an invasion of Chechnya. The Avar army gathered in their capital Khunzakh and was led by the Khan's son Muhammad. They marched into Chechnya and reached the mountainous Khachara in Central Chechnya. There Gheza and his army closed the entrance of the Argun gorge and surrounded their army, killing half of them, including a prominent Avar scientist named Atanasil Husayn. The Russian-German General Adolf Berge writes in 1859: "The Avars, seeing that they were barred from retreat, tried to break through, but were instantly surrounded and scattered, with more than half of them exterminated. Since then, the Chechens have a saying to evoke the idea of a huge amount of worthless things, they say: "it is cheaper than the Avar hats on Argun."

== Bibliography ==
- Айтберов, Т. М. (2006). Аваро-Чеченскик правители из династии труловых и их правовые памятники XVII в. (гумбетовцы в средневековой и новой истории Северо-восточного Кавказа) [Avaro-Chechen rulers from the Trulov dynasty and their legal monuments of the 17th century. (Gumbetians in the medieval and modern history of the North-Eastern Caucasus)] (PDF) (in Russian) (2nd ed.). Махачкала: «Формат». pp. 1–92.
- Зязиков, М. М. (2004). Традиционная культура ингушей: история и современность [Traditional culture of the Ingush: history and modernity] (in Russian). Ростов-на-Дону: СКНЦ ВШ. pp. 1–312. ISBN 5-87872-302-6.
- Матиев, М. А. (2002). Дахкильгов, И. А. (ed.). Гӏалгӏай турпала иллеш [Illis about Ingush hero] (in Ingush). Нальчик: «Республиканский полиграфкомбинат им. Революции 1905 г.». pp. 1–332.
- Matsiev, A. G. (1965). "Чеберлоевский диалект чеченского языка" [Cheberloy dialect of the Chechen language]. Izvestiya ChINIIIYaL Yazykoznanie (in Russian). 1 (2). Grozny: Chech.-Ing. kn. izd-vo: 3–95.
- Тесаев, Амин (2019-12-30). "Гази Алдамов, или Алдаман ГIеза, воевода и предвод" [Gazi Aldamov, or Aldaman Gheza, governor and leader]. proza.ru (in Russian).
- Шаповалов, В. А.; Кемпинский, Э. В. (2001). Северный Кавказ: геополитика, история, культура : материалы всероссийской научной конференции, Ставрополь, 11-14 сентября 2001 г.: ч. 1 [North Caucasus: geopolitics, history, culture: materials of the All-Russian scientific conference, Stavropol, September 11–14, 2001: part 1] (in Russian). Ставрополь: Изд-во Ставропольского гос. ун-та. ISBN 5886482830.
- Яковлев, Н. Ф. (1925). Ингуши [The Ingush] (in Russian). Москва: Типография Госиздата "Красный Пролетарий". pp. 1–134.
