= Zamir Yushaev =

Chechen painter

Zamir Tagirovich Yushaev
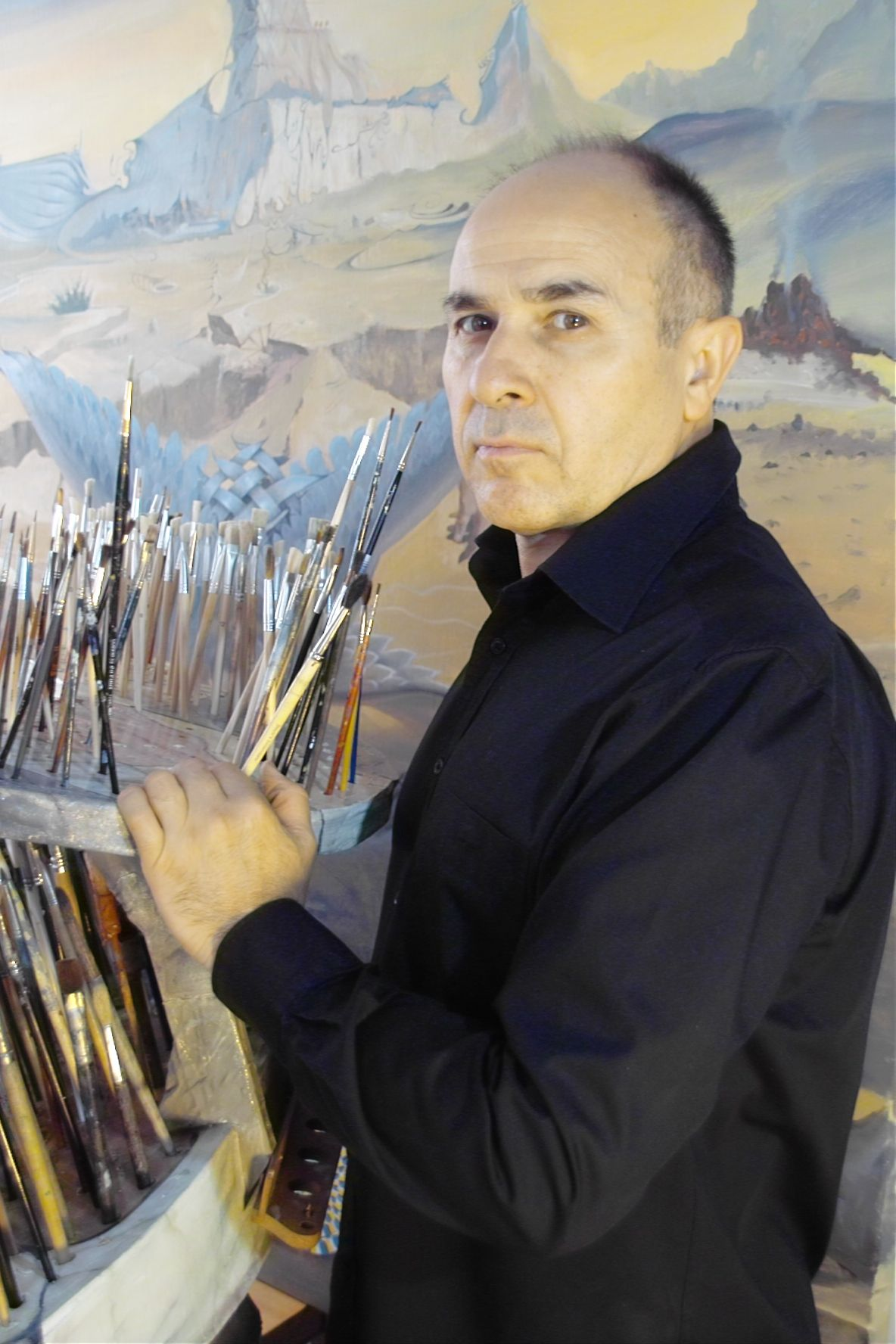
- Born: 22 April 1965 (age 61); Khasavyurt, USSR
- Website: zamir-j.de

Zamir Tagirovich Yushaev (Russian: Зами́р Таги́рович Юша́ев, born 22 April 1965, Khasavyurt, Dagestan ASSR, RSFSR, USSR) is a Chechen artist currently residing in Leipzig, Germany. He is a member of the German Artists' Union.

== Biography ==
Yushaev was born on 22 April 1965 into a large family in Khasavyurt. His father, Tagir Yushaev, was a watchmaker and amateur artist. In 1984, he graduated from an art college in Makhachkala and subsequently served in the Soviet Army for two years. From 1987 to 1992, he studied at the Saint Petersburg Repin Academy of Arts with his older brother, Sultan (also a renowned artist, now living in Belgium). He graduated from the Institute of Arts at Leipzig University in 1997.

Since 1999, he has been residing and working in Germany, where he has his own studio and gallery in Leipzig. Also in 1999, he became a member of the German Artists' Union.

== Style and works ==
Yushaev's artistic expression is rooted in surrealism and, more recently, performance art. His paintings can be found in private and public collections worldwide, including Austria, Brazil, Germany, Denmark, France, Japan, Norway, Spain, Sweden, Turkey, the Czech Republic, the United States, and elsewhere. Additionally, he takes commissions for caricature drawings.

His work has garnered considerable acclaim, attracting clients such as Angelina Jolie, Montserrat Caballé, and various Russian politicians and businessmen. He positions himself as a representative of the Chechen people both through his art and by donning Circassian clothing. Chechen often features in his works.

Aside from his artistic pursuits, Yushaev holds a black belt in karate and participates in martial arts competitions.

== Literature ==
- Муса Гешаев. (2006). Знаменитые чеченцы. Vol. 4 (2000 экз ed.). Мусаиздат. pp. 484–511.
