= Teip =

Sub-ethnic division (social organization) of the Chechen and Ingush people

Members of the Obankhoy teip in 1930

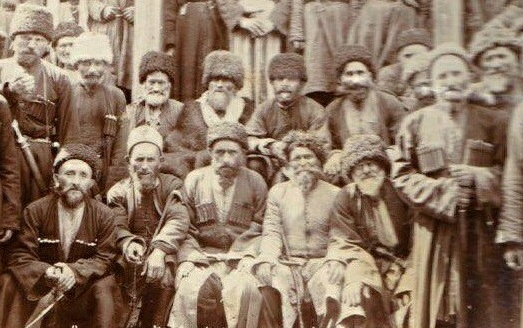
Members of the Zumsoy teip in 1906

A teip (/teɪp/ "tape"; Chechen and Ingush: тайпа, romanized: taypa, pronounced [ˈtəɪpə]; lit. 'family, kin, clan, tribe') is a Chechen and Ingush tribal organization or clan, self-identified through descent from a common ancestor or geographic location. It is a sub-unit of the tukkhum and shahar. There are about 150 Chechen and 120 Ingush teips. Teips played a major role in the socioeconomic life of the Chechen and Ingush peoples before and during the Middle Ages, and remain an important part of their cultures.

== Traditional features ==
Traditional teip features include:

- Communal land tenure
- Honor killing if the honor of a teip member is violated. Violations can include murder, rape, denigrating remarks about a female family member, or homosexuality. The practice also applies to women regarding non-marital relations, loss of virginity, adopting deviant morals, and dishonoring the family.
- Exogamy; marriages between members of the same clan are prohibited.
- Election of teip representatives
- Election of a headman
- Election of a military leader during war
- Open sessions of the Council of Elders
- The right to depose teip representatives
- Male relatives represent women.
- The right to adopt outside people
- Transfer of property of departed members to teip members
- A defined territory
- Teip-constructed towers, buildings, or natural monuments for shelter or a fortress
- Teip cemeteries
- Hospitality

== Identity, land, and descent ==
Teips, as sub-units of tukkhums, are traditionally thought to have members descended from a common ancestor and considered distant blood relatives. Teip names were often derived from an ancestral founder. Like other North Caucasian peoples, Chechen and Ingush men were traditionally expected to know the names and places of origin of their ancestors on their father's side (usually for seven generations). Many women also memorized this information, and some people could identify their maternal ancestral lines. Memorizing this information instills clan loyalty in young people. Large-scale land disputes among the peoples of the Caucasus were sometimes traditionally resolved through shared knowledge of where and when ancestors had lived.

Ancestral land was considered sacred to a teip due to its close connection to the teip's identity. It was typically marked by clans, including the clan cemetery, tower, and sanctuary. Due to the scarcity of land in mountainous Ingushetia and Chechnya, each teip claimed a specific area after the feudal system was overthrown. Land boundaries were marked by stones with specific markings pointing to a local place of worship. Land was initially owned collectively, but individual cultivation ultimately became the norm. In Chechen and Ingush tradition, women were allowed to own land. Vehement Ingush and Chechen opposition to Soviet collectivization has been attributed to its threat to traditional customs of land allotment.

== Politics ==
Each teip had an elected council of elders, a court of justice, and its own customs. The civilian chief, known as the thamda or kh'alkhancha, chaired the council of elders. The baechcha was the military leader.

== Subdivisions ==
Each teip has its own subdivisions: in order of their progressive nesting, the vaer, the gar and the neqe. The neqe consists of households sharing the same family name; the gar is several neqe units with a common lineage (not always the case). The basic social unit is the household, consisting of an extended family spanning three or four generations and known as the ts'a or the dözal; married daughters usually live in the household of their spouse. Brothers share land and livestock.

== Formation of new teips ==
The number of teips has varied. There were 59 Chechen and Ingush teips in the early 19th century, increasing to a hundred by the mid-19th century; currently, there are about 170. New teips could be founded when a large gar broke off and became a full-fledged teip.

== List of teips ==
This is a list of teips with the Chechen tukkhum to which each may belong:

- Cheberloy tukkhum (Russian: Чебарлой)
  - Achaloy (Ачалой)
  - Nizhaloy (Нижалой)
  - Makazhoy (Макажой)
  - Rigakhoy (Ригахой)
  - Buni (Буни)
- Sharoy tukkhum (Шарой)
- Shatoy tukkhum (Шотой)
  - Varandoy (Варандой)
  - Keloy (Келой)
  - Tumsoy (Тумсой)
- Ovkhoy tukkhum (Ауховцы, Овхой)
  - Veappii (Вяппий)
- Melkhi tukkhum (Мeлхий)
- Nokhchmakhkakhoy tukkhum (Нохчмахкахой)
  - Alleroy (Алларой)
  - Belgatoy (Белгатой)
  - Benoy (Беной)
  - Biltoy (Билтой)
  - Chartoy (Чартой)
  - Chermoy (Чермой)
  - Tsontaroy (Цонтарой)
  - Elistanzhkhoy (Элистанжхой)
  - Engnoy (Энганой)
  - Ersenoy (Эрсеной)
  - Gendargenoy (Гендаргеной)
  - Gordaloy (Гордалой)
  - Gunoy (Гуной)
  - Kharachoy (Харачой)
  - Kurchaloy (Курчалой)
  - Shonoy (Шуоной)
  - Yalkhoy (Ялхой)
  - Zandkhoy (Зандкъой)
- Orstkhoy tukkhum (Орстхой)
  - Tsechoy (Цечой)
  - Anastoy (Анастой)
  - Gala (Галай)
  - Ghoandaloy (Гандалой)
  - Merzhoy (Мержой)
  - Guloy (Гулой)
  - Yalkharoy (Ялхарой)
  - Khaikharoy (Хевхарой)
- Chantiy tukkhum (Чантий)
  - Chanti (Чанти)
- Tukkhum unknown or nonexistent:
  - Chinkhoy (Чинахой)
  - Dishni (Дишни)
  - Marshaloy (Маршалой)
  - Mulkoy (Мулкой)
  - Nashkhoy (Нашхой)
  - Peshkhoy (Пешхой)
  - Satoy (Сатой)
  - Turkoy (Туркой)
  - Terloy (Терлой)
  - Khindkhoy (Хиндхой)
  - Kalkhoy (Калхой)
  - Yalkhoroy (Ялхорой)
  - Zumsoy (Зумсой)
  - Zurzaqoy (Зурзакхой)

These teips include the Ingush shahars:

- Zhayrakhoy shahar (Джераховцы)
  - Ahrievs (Ахриевы)
  - Borovs (Боровы)
  - Lyanovs (Льяновы)
  - Tsurovs (Цуроевы)
  - Khamatkhanovs (Хаматхановы)
- Feappiy shahar (Фяппий)
  - Oartskhoy (Оарцхой)
  - Gelatkhoy (Гелатхой)
  - Obankhoy (Обанхой)
  - Kharpkhoy (Харпхой)
  - Salgkhoy (Салгхой)
  - Torshkhoy (Торшхой)
  - Korakhoy (Корахой)
  - Väppiy (Вяппий)
- Khamkhoy shahar (Хамхинцы)
  - Egikhoy (Эгихой)
  - Khamkhoy (Хамхой)
  - Targimkhoy (Таргимхой)
  - Barakhoy (Барахой)
  - Barkinkhoy (Баркинхой)
  - Tumkhoy (Тумхой)
  - Barkkhanoy (Баркханой)
  - Leimoy (Леймой)
  - Khulkhoy (Хулхой)
- Tshoroy shahar (Цоринцы)
  - Tshoroy (Цхьорой)
  - Ozdoy (Оздой)
  - Mokhloy (Мохлой)
- Galashkakhoy shahar (Галашевцы)
- Orstkhoy shahar (Орстхой)
  - Ghoandaloy (Гандалой)
  - Tsechoy (Цечой)
  - Anastoy (Анастой)
  - Galay (Галай)
  - Belharoy (Белхарой)
  - Merzhoy (Мержой)
  - Guloy (Гулой)
  - Muzhakhoy (Мужахой)
  - Khaikharoy (Хайхарой)
  - Yalkharoy (Ялхарой)
- Chulkhoy shahar (Чулхой)

== See also ==
- History of Chechnya
- History of Ingushetia
- Medieval history of Christianity in Chechnya

== Bibliography ==
=== Russian sources ===
- Ибрагимов, Х. И.; Тишков, В. А.; Осмаев, А. Д.; Устинова, М. Я., eds. (2006). Чеченская Республика и чеченцы: история и современность [Chechen Republic and Chechens: history and modernity] (in Russian). М.: Наука. pp. 1–575. ISBN 5-02-034016-2.
- Ибрагимов, М.-Р. А. (2002). "Чеченцы" [Chechens]. In Арутюнов, С.А.; Османов, А.И.; Сергеева, Г.А. (eds.). Народы Дагестана [Peoples of Dagestan] (PDF). Народы и Культуры (in Russian). М.: Наука. pp. 460–472. ISBN 5-02-008808-0.
