= Zelenomorsk =

Zelenomorsk Зеленоморск
- Selo
- Location within Republic of Dagestan Location within Russia
- Coordinates: 42°46′N 47°41′E
- Country: Russia
- Region: Republic of Dagestan
- District: Karabudakhkentsky District
- Time zone: UTC+3:00

Zelenomorsk (Russian: Зеленоморск) is a rural locality (a selo) in Karabudakhkentsky District, Republic of Dagestan, Russia. The population was 1,005 as of 2010. There are 21 streets.

== Geography ==
Zelenomorsk is located 17 km northeast of Karabudakhkent (the district's administrative centre) by road. Manaskent and Manas are the nearest rural localities.

== Nationalities ==
Dargins and Kumyks live there.
