= Makhachkala constituency =

Makhachkala single-member constituency
- Constituency of the Russian State Duma
- Deputy: Magomed Valikhov; Independent
- Federal subject: Republic of Dagestan
- Districts: Babayurtovsky, Kaspiysk, Kizilyurt, Kizilyurtovsky, Kizlyar, Kizlyarsky, Kumtorkalinsky, Makhachkala, Nogaysky, Tarumovsky, Yuzhno-Sukhokumsk
- Voters: 580,032 (2026)

The Makhachkala constituency (No.10 (Note: No.11 in 1993-2003, No.12 in 2003-2007, Northern constituency No.10 in 2016–2026)) is a Russian legislative constituency in Dagestan. The constituency covers northern Dagestan, mostly populated by Kumyks, Nogais and Russians, including the cities of Makhachkala and Kaspiysk.

The constituency has been represented since 2026 by United Russia faction member Magomed Valikhov, former Dagestan Deputy Minister of Health and retired Medical Service podpolkovnik, who won the open seat as an Independent after one-term United Russia incumbent Abdulkhakim Gadzhiyev lost the primary.

== Boundaries ==
1993–2003: Babayurtovsky District, Karabudakhkentsky District, Kaspiysk, Kazbekovsky District, Khasavyurt, Khasavyurtovsky District, Kizilyurt, Kizilyurtovsky District, Kizlyar, Kizlyarsky District, Kumtorkalinsky District, Makhachkala, Nogaysky District, Novolaksky District, Tarumovsky District, Yuzhno-Sukhokumsk
The constituency covered northern half of Dagestan, including the republican capital of Makhachkala and towns of Kaspiysk, Khasavyurt, Kizilyurt, Kizlyar and Yuzhno-Sukhokumsk.

2003–2007: Babayurtovsky District, Kaspiysk, Kizilyurt, Kizilyurtovsky District, Kizlyar, Kizlyarsky District, Makhachkala, Nogaysky District, Tarumovsky District, Yuzhno-Sukhokumsk
The constituency was significantly altered after the 2003 redistricting, retaining Northern Dagestan, Makhachkala, Kizilyurt and small stretches to connect the three areas. The constituency lost Khasavyurt, Kazbekovsky, Khasavyurtovsky, Kumtorkalinsky and Novolaksky districts to Buynaksk constituency, and Karabudakhkentsky District to new Derbent constituency.

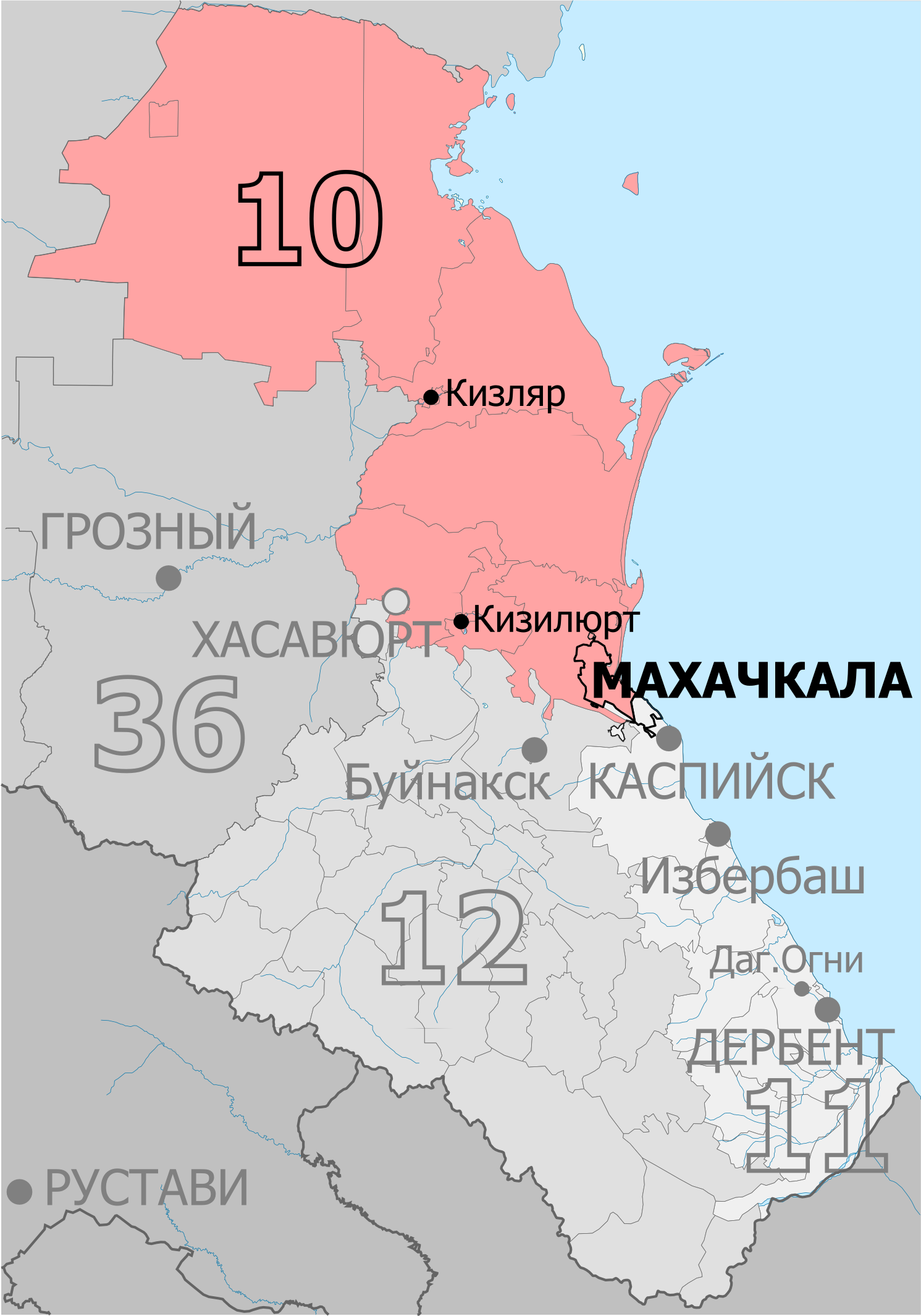
Constituency boundaries from 2016 to 2026

2016–2026 Northern constituency: Babayurtovsky District, Khasavyurtovsky District, Kizilyurt, Kizilyurtovsky District, Kizlyar, Kizlyarsky District, Kumtorkalinsky District, Makhachkala (Kirovsky, Sovetsky), Nogaysky District, Tarumovsky District, Yuzhno-Sukhokumsk
The constituency was re-created for the 2016 election and received a new name "Northern constituency". This seat retained almost all of its former territory, losing only Kaspiysk and Leninsky city district of Makhachkala to Central constituency. The constituency gained Khasavyurtovsky and Kumtorkalinsky from the former Buynaksk constituency.

2026–present: Babayurtovsky District, Kaspiysk, Kizilyurt, Kizilyurtovsky District, Kizlyar, Kizlyarsky District, Kumtorkalinsky District, Makhachkala, Nogaysky District, Tarumovsky District, Yuzhno-Sukhokumsk
After the 2025 redistricting the constituency took its old name "Makhachkala constituency" and regained Leninsky district of Makhachkala and Kaspiysk from the former Central constituency. The constituency shedded Khasavyurtovsky District to neighbouring Buynaksk constituency.

== Members elected ==
Election	Member	Party
1993	Magomed Tolboyev	Independent
1995	Gamid Gamidov (Note: appointed Minister of Finance of Dagestan in April 1996)	Independent
1996	Nadirshakh Khachilayev	Union of Muslims
1999	Gadzhi Makhachev	Independent
2003	Gadzhi Makhachev	People's Party
2007	Proportional representation - no election by constituency	
2011	Proportional representation - no election by constituency	
2016	Umakhan Umakhanov	United Russia
2021	Abdulkhakim Gadzhiyev	United Russia
2026	Magomed Valikhov	Independent

== Election results ==
=== 1993 ===
==== Declared candidates ====
- Dadash Gadzhiyev (Independent), Chairman of the Kumtorkalinsky District Committee on Economy and State Property
- Magomed Gamzatov (Independent), Head of Makhachkala Kirovsky City District
- Israfil Israfilov (Independent), lawyer
- Anvarbek Kadiyev (Civic Union), businessman
- Magomagazi Kamilov (Independent), rector of San Marino International Institute of Business Management and Law
- Anatoly Kravtsov (Independent), Head of Kizlyar Department of People's Education
- Kubasay Kubasayev (YaBL), Deputy Head of the State Committee on Antimonopoly Policy Regional Office
- Yury Kulchik (Independent), State Committee of Russia on Federation and Nationalities staffer
- Gadzhi Makhachev (PRES), Member of Supreme Council of Dagestan (1991–present), oil executive
- Umalat Nasrutdinov (APR), former First Secretary of the CPSU Leninsky District Committee (1989–1991), kolkhoz chairman
- Sergey Reshulsky (CPRF), former People's Deputy of Russia (1990–1993)
- Magomed Tolboyev (Independent), LII test pilot, retired Russian Air Force major general, Hero of Russia (1992)
- Ilyas Umakhanov (Independent), former Head of the Central Committee of the Komsomol International Department (1989–1991)
- Azim Yarakhmedov (Independent), advisor to the Embassy of Russia to Azerbaijan (1993–present)
- Murad Zagirshiyev (Independent), former People's Deputy of Russia (1990–1993)

==== Results ====
Summary of the 12 December 1993 Russian legislative election in the Makhachkala constituency
Candidate	Party	Votes	%
Magomed Tolboyev	Independent	78,275	26.48%
Ilyas Umakhanov	Independent	–	15.57%
Dadash Gadzhiyev	Independent	–	–
Magomed Gamzatov	Independent	–	–
Israfil Israfilov	Independent	–	–
Anvarbek Kadiyev	Civic Union	–	–
Magomagazi Kamilov	Independent	–	–
Anatoly Kravtsov	Independent	–	–
Kubasay Kubasayev	Yavlinsky–Boldyrev–Lukin	–	–
Yury Kulchik	Independent	–	–
Gadzhi Makhachev	Party of Russian Unity and Accord	–	–
Umalat Nasrutdinov	Agrarian Party	–	–
Sergey Reshulsky	Communist Party	–	–
Azim Yarakhmedov	Independent	–	–
Murad Zargishiyev	Independent	–	–
Total		295,552	100%

=== 1995 ===
Results by district: Gamidov: 30–40% 40–50%; Tolboyev: 10–20% 20–30% 40–50%; Aliyev: 30–40% 40–50% 60–70%; Makhachev: 50–60% 60–70%; Ilyasov: 30–40% 60–70%; Atavov: 20–30% 40–50%; Spoilt ballots: 30–40%

==== Declared candidates ====
- Bagadur Abasov (Independent), Chairman of the Khasavyurtovsky District Assembly of Deputies (1994–present)
- Atay Aliyev (SMR), Member of People's Assembly of the Republic of Dagestan (1995–present), businessman
- Azim Asvarov (AAR), attorney
- Magomed Atavov (Independent), nonprofit president
- Dalgat Dzhanakavov (CPRF), first secretary of the Khasavyurt city party committee
- Bilal Dzhakhbarov (Independent), Central Bank of Russia regional office official
- Isagadzhi Gadzhiyev (Independent), trading businessman
- Gamid Gamidov (Independent), Member of State Duma (1994–present)
- Nurmagomed Gazimagomedov (Independent), political activist
- Akhmedkhan Guseynov (LDPR), wrestling coach
- Magomed Guseynov (Independent), kolkhoz driver
- Stanislav Ilyasov (Independent), RAO UES executive
- Asya Ismailova (Women of Russia), aide to State Duma member
- Magomed Khalilov (Independent), Mayor of Kaspiysk (1970–present)
- German Kirilenko (Independent), Russian Army major general
- Gadzhi Magomedov (Independent), physician
- Gadzhi Makhachev (Independent), Member of People's Assembly of the Republic of Dagestan (1995–present), oil executive, 1993 candidate for this seat
- Magomed Nuruchev (Independent), nonprofit chairman
- Magomed Sutayev (DVR–OD), banker
- Magomed Tolboyev (Independent), incumbent Member of State Duma (1994–present)

==== Results ====
Summary of the 17 December 1995 Russian legislative election in the Makhachkala constituency
Candidate	Party	Votes	%
Gamid Gamidov	Independent	83,987	22.68%
Magomed Tolboyev (incumbent)	Independent	51,614	13.94%
Atay Aliyev	Union of Muslims	48,655	13.14%
Gadzhi Makhachev	Independent	28,457	7.68%
Stanislav Ilyasov	Independent	27,947	7.55%
Magomed Atavov	Independent	23,660	6.39%
Dalgat Dzhanakavov	Communist Party	17,776	4.80%
Isagadzhi Gadzhiyev	Independent	9,906	2.67%
Magomed Guseynov	Independent	8,501	2.30%
German Kirilenko	Independent	7,502	2.03%
Asya Ismailova	Women of Russia	3,257	0.88%
Azim Asvarov	Russian Lawyers' Association	1,996	0.54%
Magomed Sutayev	Democratic Choice of Russia – United Democrats	1,983	0.54%
Gadzhi Magomedov	Independent	1,741	0.47%
Nurmagomed Gazimagomedov	Independent	1,492	0.40%
Akhmedkhan Guseynov	Liberal Democratic Party	950	0.26%
against all		5,768	1.56%
Total		370,358	100%

=== 1996 ===
==== Declared candidates ====
- Alikber Abdulgamidov (Independent), journalist
- Omar Begov (Independent), former Member of State Duma (1994–1995)
- Magomed Dzhanbuyev (Independent), Member of People's Assembly of the Republic of Dagestan (1995–present), businessman
- Khapisat Gamzatova (Independent), Minister of Information and Press of Dagestan (1992–present), former Deputy Premier of Dagestan (1984–1992)
- Magomedkhan Gamzatkhanov (Independent), mixed martial artist, wrestler
- Nadirshakh Khachilayev (Independent), chairman of the Union of Muslims of Russia (1996–present)
- Omar Tupaliyev (Independent), militsiya colonel

==== Withdrawn candidates ====
- Gasan Gasanov (Independent), attorney
- Ramazan Khiziyev (Independent)
- Gereykhan Palchayev (Independent), filmmaker, journalist
- Saygidpasha Umakhanov (Independent), Sberbank branch manager in Khasavyurt

==== Results ====
Summary of the 8 December 1996 by-election in the Makhachkala constituency
Candidate	Party	Votes	%
Nadirshakh Khachilayev	Independent	72,641	26.73%
Khapisat Gamzatova	Independent	47,764	17.58%
Magomedkhan Gamzatkhanov	Independent	43,108	15.87%
Omar Begov	Independent	42,570	15.67%
Alikber Abdulgamidov	Independent	27,531	10.13%
Magomed Dzhanbuyev	Independent	18,310	6.74%
Omar Tupaliyev	Independent	17,861	6.57%
against all		1,932	0.71%
Total		271,717	100%

=== 1999 ===
==== Declared candidates ====
- Khaybula Abdulgapurov (DN), Gamzat Tsadasa Avar Music and Drama Theatre chief director
- Gadzhi Makhachev (Independent), Member of People's Assembly of the Republic of Dagestan (1995–present), Rosneft executive, 1993 and 1995 candidate for this seat
- Ruslan Suleymanov (SPS), attorney

==== Withdrawn candidates ====
- Ziyavdin Adzhiyev (Independent), businessman
- Sakhratula Amirilayev (Independent), businessman
- Abdulgapur Gasanov (Independent)
- Sergey Ulyanenko (Independent)

==== Did not file ====
- Patimat Gadzhiyeva (Independent)

==== Declined ====
- Nadirshakh Khachilayev (Independent), incumbent Member of State Duma (1996–present), chairman of the Union of Muslims of Russia (1996–present) (arrested in October 1999)

==== Results ====
Summary of the 19 December 1999 Russian legislative election in the Makhachkala constituency
Candidate	Party	Votes	%
Gadzhi Makhachev	Independent	277,696	62.39%
Ruslan Suleymanov	Union of Right Forces	40,437	9.09%
Khaybula Abdulgapurov	Spiritual Heritage	31,708	7.12%
against all		65,661	14.75%
Total		445,087	100%

=== 2003 ===
==== Declared candidates ====
- Shamil Amirilayev (Independent), Rosneft executive
- Gadzhi Makhachev (NPRF), incumbent Member of State Duma (2000–present)

==== Withdrawn candidates ====
- Magomedkamil Zaynalov (ORP Rus'), unemployed

==== Did not file ====
- Gaydarbek Amirkhanov (Independent), physician
- Magomed Amirkhanov (Independent), businessman
- Andrey Boykov (Independent), geothermal scientist
- Ruslan Medzhidov (Independent), physicist
- Tatyana Morozova (NPSRF), businesswoman
- Raziyat Nurmagomedova (Independent), methodologist
- Nellya Radzhabova (IPR), veterans' rights activist
- Zagal Somoyev (Independent), commandant

==== Results ====
Summary of the 7 December 2003 Russian legislative election in the Makhachkala constituency
Candidate	Party	Votes	%
Gadzhi Makhachev (incumbent)	People's Party	251,983	67.16%
Shamil Amirilayev	Independent	51,930	13.84%
against all		57,456	15.31%
Total		375,340	100%

=== 2016 ===
==== Declared candidates ====
- Murzadin Avezov (CPRF), Member of People's Assembly of the Republic of Dagestan (2007–present)
- Kamil Davdiyev (A Just Russia), Member of People's Assembly of the Republic of Dagestan (2007–present)
- Dzhafar Dzhafarov (LDPR), judo sports school director
- Muslim Dzhamalutdinov (The Greens), attorney
- Dzhamal Kasumov (Independent), Member of People's Assembly of the Republic of Dagestan (2011–present), RZD executive
- Ruslan Magomedov (PARNAS), IT specialist
- Oleg Melnikov (Independent), anti-human trafficking activist
- Umakhan Umakhanov (United Russia), Member of State Duma (2011–present)
- Zalimkhan Valiyev (Independent), unemployed

==== Withdrawn candidates ====
- Ramazan Mamedov (Rodina), former Member of State Council of Dagestan (1998–2006)

==== Did not file ====
- Gabib Abdullatipov (CPCR), perennial candidate
- Magomed Magomedov (Yabloko), former Deputy Head of Tsuntinsky District
- Magomed Malikov (Independent), Deputy Minister of Youth of Dagestan (2016–present)
- Bariyat Murzayeva (Independent), engineer

==== Results ====
Summary of the 18 September 2016 Russian legislative election in the Northern constituency
Candidate	Party	Votes	%
Umakhan Umakhanov	United Russia	305,228	67.50%
Dzhamal Kasumov	Independent	64,166	14.19%
Zalimkhan Valiyev	Independent	34,806	7.70%
Murzadin Avezov	Communist Party	19,390	4.29%
Kamil Davdiyev	A Just Russia	8,598	1.90%
Oleg Melnikov	Independent	6,185	1.37%
Dzhafar Dzhafarov	Liberal Democratic Party	5,241	1.16%
Muslim Dzhamalutdinov	The Greens	3,242	0.72%
Ruslan Magomedov	People's Freedom Party	3,026	0.67%
Total		452,219	100%

=== 2021 ===
==== Declared candidates ====
- Murzadin Avezov (CPRF), Member of People's Assembly of the Republic of Dagestan (2007–present), 2016 candidate for this seat
- Abdulkhakim Gadzhiyev (United Russia), Deputy Commander of the Rosgvardiya North Caucasus District (2016–present), Russian Police major general
- Vagid Devletkhanov (Yabloko), Member of Shikhikent Assembly of Deputies (2020–present)
- Irina Dibirova (The Greens), homemaker
- Shakhnavaz Guseynov (LDPR), construction executive
- Murat Paizulayev (SR–ZP), Member of People's Assembly of the Republic of Dagestan (2011–present)
- Kurban Ramazanov (RPPSS), education centre head
- Vladimir Telikhov (Rodina), community activist, United Russia primary candidate
- Rashid Yanikov (New People), businessman

==== Failed to qualify ====
- Magomedshamil Shabanov (Independent), attorney

==== Declined ====
- Adam Amirilayev (United Russia), former Member of State Duma (2007–2012) (lost the primary)
- Umakhan Umakhanov (United Russia), incumbent Member of State Duma (2011–present)

==== Results ====
Summary of the 17-19 September 2021 Russian legislative election in the Northern constituency
Candidate	Party	Votes	%
Abdulkhakim Gadzhiyev	United Russia	369,167	84.87%
Murzadin Avezov	Communist Party	25,136	5.78%
Murat Paizulayev	A Just Russia — For Truth	15,139	3.48%
Shakhnavaz Guseynov	Liberal Democratic Party	7,927	1.82%
Vladimir Telikhov	Rodina	3,848	0.88%
Rashid Yanikov	New People	3,214	0.74%
Irina Dibirova	The Greens	2,648	0.61%
Vagid Devletkhanov	Yabloko	2,351	0.54%
Kurban Ramazanov	Party of Pensioners	2,286	0.53%
Total		434,971	100%

=== 2026 ===
==== Declared candidates ====
- Murzadin Avezov (CPRF), Member of People's Assembly of the Republic of Dagestan (2007–present), aide to State Duma member, 2016 and 2021 candidate for this seat
- Vagid Devletkhanov (Yabloko), former Member of Shikhikent Assembly of Deputies (2020–2025), 2021 candidate for this seat
- Paizula Dzhavatkhanov (New People), Member of Kaspiysk Assembly of Deputies (2025–present), businessman
- Daniyal Gadzhiyev (LDPR), former journalist
- Nazhmudin Magomedeminov (The Greens), construction materials senior lecturer
- Murat Paizulayev (A Just Russia), Member of People's Assembly of the Republic of Dagestan (2011–present), 2021 candidate for this seat
- Magomed Valikhov (Independent), Deputy Minister of Health of Dagestan (2026–present)

==== Withdrawn candidates ====
- Enver Nabiyev (United Russia), Russian Army guards major, Hero of Russia (2022) (withdrew August 27, 2026, running on the party list)

==== Did not file ====
- Akhmed Shamsudinov (Independent), nonprofit president

==== Declined ====
- Gadzhi Biyarslanov (United Russia), Member of People's Assembly of the Republic of Dagestan (2021–present), construction businessman (lost the primary)
- Abdulkhakim Gadzhiyev (United Russia), incumbent Member of State Duma (2021–present) (lost the primary)
- Biysultan Khamzaev (United Russia), Member of State Duma (2021–present) (lost the primary)
- Tabir Malikov (United Russia), acting Head of Buynaksky District (2025–present) (lost the primary)

==== Results ====
Summary of the 18-20 September 2026 Russian legislative election in the Makhachkala constituency
Candidate	Party	Votes	%
Magomed Valikhov	Independent	429,630	82.37%
Murat Paizulayev	A Just Russia	24,390	4.68%
Murzadin Avezov	Communist Party	22,899	4.39%
Daniyal Gadzhiyev	Liberal Democratic Party	13,867	2.66%
Paizula Dzhavatkhanov	New People	11,114	2.13%
Vagid Devletkhanov	Yabloko	9,676	1.86%
Nazhmudin Magomedeminov	The Greens	8,805	1.69%
Total		521,561	100%
