= Verkhny Chiamakhi =

Verkhny Chiamakhi Верхний Чиамахи ЧебяхI ЧIигIямахьи
- Selo
- Location within Republic of Dagestan Location within Russia
- Coordinates: 42°01′N 47°23′E
- Country: Russia
- Region: Republic of Dagestan
- District: Akushinsky District
- Time zone: UTC+3:00

Verkhny Chiamakhi (Russian: Верхний Чиамахи; Dargwa: ЧебяхI ЧIигIямахьи) is a rural locality (a selo) in Kassagumakhinsky Selsoviet, Akushinsky District, Republic of Dagestan, Russia. The population was 78 as of 2010.

== Geography ==
Verkhny Chiamakhi is located 41 km south of Akusha (the district's administrative centre) by road, on the Karakotta River. Nizhny Chiamakhi is the nearest rural locality.
