= Gadzhiyev =

Gadzhiyev, Gadzhiev or Hajiyev (Azerbaijani: Hacıyev, Russian: Гаджиев) is an Asian masculine surname, its feminine counterpart is Gadzhiyeva, Gadzhieva or Hajiyeva. It may refer to

Gadzhiyev

- Abdulkhakim Gadzhiyev (born 1966), Russian politician
- Daniyal Gadzhiyev (born 1986), Kazakhstani born-Dagestani wrestler
- Gadzhi Gadzhiyev (born 1945), Russian football manager
- Gadzhi Gadzhiyev (footballer) (born 1991), Russian football midfplayerileder
- Gaidar Gadzhiyev (1953–2001), Russian major general of the Strategic Missile Troops
- Magomedmurad Gadzhiev (born 1988), Russian-Polish freestyle wrestler
- Magomedemin Gadzhiev (born 1961), Russian politician
- Magomed Gadzhiyev (born 1965), Russian politician, State Duma Deputy of the Federal Assembly of the Russian Federation of the IV, V, VI and VII convocations
- Magomet Gadzhiyev (1907–1942), Soviet Navy submarine commander
- Makhach Gadzhiyev (born 1987), Russian football player
- Rustam Gadzhiyev (born 1978), Russian football player

Gadzhiev

- Murad Gadzhiev (born 1961), Russian politician
- Ruslan Gadzhiev (born 1978), Russian politician

Hacıyeva

- Nergiz Hacıyeva (born 1991), Azerbaijani women's footballer

Hajiyev

- Aftandil Hajiyev (born 1981), Azerbaijani footballer
- Alif Hajiyev (1953–1992), Azerbaijani military officer
- Bakhtiyar Hajiyev (born c. 1982), Azerbaijani activist
- Boyukagha Hajiyev (1958–2018), Azerbaijani footballer and manager
- Diana Hajiyeva (born 1989), Azerbaijani singer and songwriter
- Hikmet Hajiyev (born 1979), Assistant to the President of Azerbaijan
- Ilkin Hajiyev (born 1983), Azerbaijani futsal player
- Ismayil Hajiyev (born 1949), Azerbaijani-Canadian composer and conductor
- Jahangir Hajiyev (born 1961), Azerbaijani banker
- Jovdat Hajiyev (1917–2002), Azerbaijani composer
- Nizami Hajiyev (born 1988), Azerbaijani footballer
- Rafig Hajiyev (born 1946), Azerbaijani wrestler
- Rauf Hajiyev (1922–1995), Azerbaijani composer and politician
- Rizvan Gadzhiev (born 1987), freestyle wrestler from Belarus
- Zamira Hajiyeva (born 1963), first recipient of an Unexplained Wealth Order, under a UK anti-corruption law, wife of Jahangir
- Zulfi Hajiyev (1935–1991), Azerbaijani politician
