= Derbent constituency =

Derbent single-member constituency
- Constituency of the Russian State Duma
- Deputy: Khizri Abakarov; United Russia
- Federal subject: Republic of Dagestan
- Districts: Agulsky, Akhtynsky, Akushinsky, Dagestanskiye Ogni, Dakhadayevsky, Derbent, Derbentsky, Dokuzparinsky, Izberbash, Karabudakhkentsky, Kayakentsky, Kaytagsky, Khivsky, Kulinsky, Kurakhsky, Laksky, Magaramkentsky, Rutulsky, Sergokalinsky, Suleyman-Stalsky, Tabasaransky
- Voters: 580,350 (2026)

The Derbent constituency (No.12 (Note: No.11 in 2003-2007, Central constituency No.11 in 2016–2026)) is a Russian legislative constituency in Dagestan. The constituency covers southern Dagestan, stretching alongside Caspian Sea from Kaspiysk to the border with Azerbaijan and covering areas populated by Dargins, Kumyks, Laks and Lezgins.

The constituency has been represented since 2026 by United Russia deputy Khizri Abakarov, two-term State Duma member and former State Secretary of Dagestan, who won the open seat, defeating four-term United Russia incumbent Murad Gadzhiev in the primary.

== Boundaries ==
2003–2007: Agulsky District, Akhtynsky District, Akushinsky District, Dagestanskiye Ogni, Dakhadayevsky District, Derbent, Derbentsky District, Dokuzparinsky District, Izerbash, Karabudakhkentsky District, Kayakentsky District, Kaytagsky District, Khivsky District, Kulinsky District, Kurakhsky District, Laksky District, Magaramkentsky District, Rutulsky District, Sergokalinsky District, Suleyman-Stalsky District, Tabasaransky District
The constituency was created during the 2003 redistricting as Dagestan gained a third State Duma seat. The constituency was based in southern Dagestan, covering Caspian Sea coast to the south of Kaspiysk, including Dagestanskiye Ogni, Derbent and Izerbash, as well as Dargin- and Lezgin-heavy mountainous south-western Dagestan.

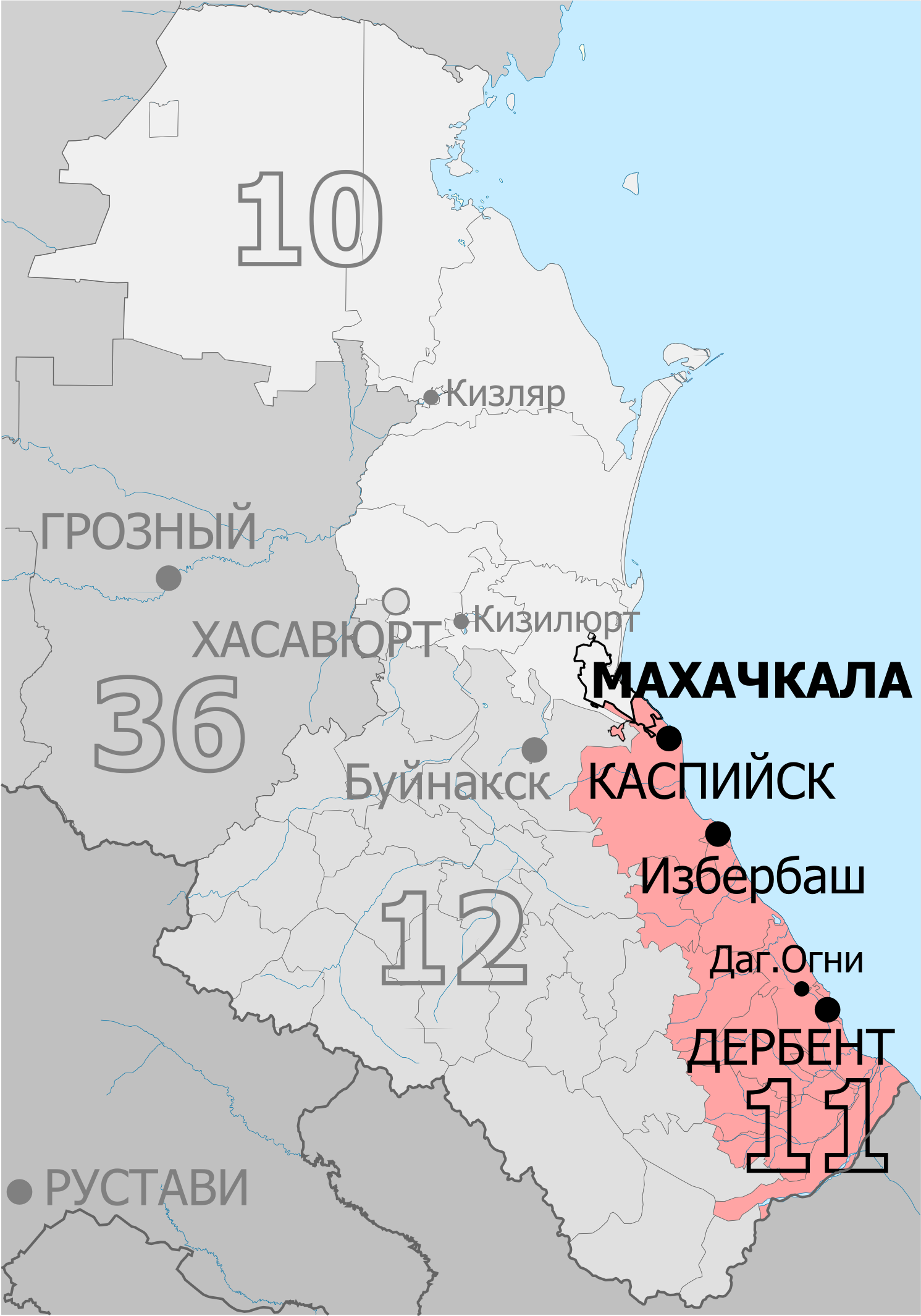
Constituency boundaries from 2016 to 2026

2016–2026 Central constituency: Dagestanskiye Ogni, Derbent, Derbentsky District, Izberbash, Karabudakhkentsky District, Kaspiysk, Kayakentsky District, Kaytagsky District, Khivsky District, Magaramkentsky District, Makhachkala (Leninsky), Sergokalinsky District, Suleyman-Stalsky District, Tabasaransky District
The constituency was re-created for the 2016 election and received a new name "Central constituency". This seat retained almost its Caspian Sea coast, losing south-western Dagestan to Southern constituency. The constituency was pushed to the north, gaining Leninsky district of Makhachkala and Kaspiysk from the former Makhachkala constituency.

2026–present: Agulsky District, Akhtynsky District, Akushinsky District, Dagestanskiye Ogni, Dakhadayevsky District, Derbent, Derbentsky District, Dokuzparinsky District, Izberbash, Karabudakhkentsky District, Kayakentsky District, Kaytagsky District, Khivsky District, Kulinsky District, Kurakhsky District, Laksky District, Magaramkentsky District, Rutulsky District, Sergokalinsky District, Suleyman-Stalsky District, Tabasaransky District
The 2025 redistricting entirely re-created the 2003–2007 version of the constituency, including the old name of "Derbent constituency".

== Members elected ==
Election	Member	Party
2003	Asanbuba Nyudyurbegov	Independent
2007	Proportional representation - no election by constituency	
2011	Proportional representation - no election by constituency	
2016	Abdulgamid Emirgamzayev	United Russia
2021	Murad Gadzhiev	United Russia
2026	Khizri Abakarov	United Russia

== Election results ==
=== 2003 ===
Results by district: Asanbuba Nyudyurbegov: 70–80% 80–90% >90%; Magomed Omarov: 50–60% 70–80% 80–90% >90%

==== Declared candidates ====
- Abdulmedzhid Bagomayev (PVR-RPZh), ecological education centre director
- Abdulkerim Magomedov (Independent), engineer
- Kamaldin Mursalov (Independent), businessman
- Asanbuba Nyudyurbegov (Independent), fishing businessman
- Magomed Omarov (Independent), Deputy Minister of Internal Affairs of Dagestan (1996–present), militsiya major general

==== Withdrawn candidates ====
- Tofik Ashurbekov (United Russia), prosecutor
- Murad Gadzhiyev (Independent), Chairman of the Derbent City Assembly (1994–present), cognac plant director
- Ali Khazbulatov (Independent), Deputy Head of Derbentsky District (1996–present)
- Gusen Kurbanov (NPS RF), attorney
- Magomedgusen Nasrutdinov (Independent), Member of People's Assembly of the Republic of Dagestan (2003–present), gas businessman

==== Failed to qualify ====
- Mugudin Kakhrimanov (Independent), retired Soviet Army major general
- Safar Khanadanov (Independent), militsiya officer
- Magomed Magomedov (Independent), state veterinary inspector
- Osman Osmanov (Independent), housing inspector
- Vyacheslav Zdanovsky (ORP Rus'), taxi station director

==== Results ====
Summary of the 7 December 2003 Russian legislative election in the Derbent constituency
Candidate	Party	Votes	%
Asanbuba Nyudyurbegov	Independent	271,218	62.96%
Magomed Omarov	Independent	136,114	31.59%
Abdulkerim Magomedov	Independent	7,757	1.80%
Kamaldin Mursalov	Independent	3,641	0.85%
Abdulmedzhid Bagomayev	Party of Russia's Rebirth-Russian Party of Life	2,896	0.67%
against all		4,944	1.15%
Total		431,328	100%

=== 2016 ===
==== Declared candidates ====
- Abdulgamid Emirgamzayev (United Russia), businessman
- Islam Klichkhanov (Yabloko), construction engineer
- Makhmud Makhmudov (CPRF), Member of People's Assembly of the Republic of Dagestan (1995–1999, 2011–present), former Member of State Duma (2003–2007)
- Murat Payzulayev (A Just Russia), Member of People's Assembly of the Republic of Dagestan (2011–present)
- Timur Saidov (CPCR), homemaker
- Mazhi Sultanov (LDPR), Member of Arakul Assembly of Deputies (2015–present)
- Islamudtin Vagabov (The Greens), pensioner

==== Withdrawn candidates ====
- Magomedrasul Omarov (Rodina), former Member of People's Assembly of the Republic of Dagestan (2007–2011), construction businessman

==== Failed to qualify ====
- Magomed Orudzhev (Independent), former prosecutor of Makhachkala Sovetsky City District (2001–2013), convicted felon
- Tazhidin Radzhabov (Independent), pensioner

==== Did not file ====
- Mamed Abasov (Independent), Member of State Duma (2013–present), United Russia primary candidate
- Mustafa Aigunov (Independent), unemployed
- Ruslan Gereyev (Independent), unemployed
- Magomedali Imanov (PRB), gas executive
- Magomed Utsiyev (Independent), pensioner

==== Results ====
Summary of the 18 September 2016 Russian legislative election in the Central constituency
Candidate	Party	Votes	%
Abdulgamid Emirgamzayev	United Russia	460,331	88.86%
Makhmud Makhmudov	Communist Party	27,213	5.25%
Murat Payzulayev	A Just Russia	8,667	1.67%
Islamutdin Vagabov	The Greens	8,450	1.63%
Timur Saidov	Communists of Russia	4,525	0.87%
Mazhi Sultanov	Liberal Democratic Party	3,876	0.75%
Islam Klichkhanov	Yabloko	2,504	0.48%
Total		518,032	100%

=== 2021 ===
==== Declared candidates ====
- Khadzhimurat Abakarov (Yabloko), lawyer
- Kamil Davdiyev (SR–ZP), Deputy Chairman of the People's Assembly of the Republic of Dagestan (2016–present), Member of the People's Assembly (2007–present)
- Leyla Dzhalilova (RPPSS), media specialist
- Daniyal Gadzhiyev (LDPR), journalist
- Murad Gadzhiyev (United Russia), Member of State Duma (2011–present), 2003 candidate for this seat
- Rinat Karimov (Rodina), singer, musician
- Makhmud Makhmudov (CPRF), Deputy Chairman of the People's Assembly of the Republic of Dagestan (2016–present), Member of the People's Assembly (1995–1999, 2011–present), former Member of State Duma (2003–2007), 2016 candidate for this seat
- Sirazhdin Ramazanov (The Greens), former chairman of the Social Democratic Party of Russia (2013–2019)
- Magomed Shaykhgasanov (New People), corporate executive

==== Declined ====
- Abdulgamid Emirgamzayev (United Russia), incumbent Member of State Duma (2016–present) (lost the primary)

==== Results ====
Summary of the 17-19 September 2021 Russian legislative election in the Central constituency
Candidate	Party	Votes	%
Murad Gadzhiyev	United Russia	406,624	80.20%
Makhmud Makhmudov	Communist Party	29,744	5.87%
Kamil Davdiyev	A Just Russia — For Truth	22,809	4.50%
Daniyal Gadzhiyev	Liberal Democratic Party	14,065	2.77%
Leyla Dzhalilova	Party of Pensioners	7,797	1.54%
Rinat Karimov	Rodina	7,053	1.39%
Khadzhimurat Abakarov	Yabloko	6,125	1.21%
Magomed Shaykhgasanov	New People	6,119	1.21%
Sirazhdin Ramazanov	The Greens	3,355	0.66%
Total		507,044	100%

=== 2026 ===
==== Declared candidates ====
- Khizri Abakarov (United Russia), Member of State Duma (2021–present)
- Marat Aliyarov (A Just Russia), Member of People's Assembly of the Republic of Dagestan (2016–2021, 2022–present), construction executive
- Albert Esedov (Yabloko), former Member of Ikra Assembly of Deputies (2020–2025), engineer
- Shakhnavaz Guseinov (LDPR), construction businessman
- Makhmud Makhmudov (CPRF), Member of People's Assembly of the Republic of Dagestan (1995–1999, 2011–present), former Member of State Duma (2003–2007), 2016 and 2021 candidate for this seat
- Zebiyula Sefibekov (New People), gas distribution station chief

==== Declined ====
- Robert Aliyev (United Russia), former Member of People's Assembly of the Republic of Dagestan (2003–2007) (lost the primary)
- Murad Gadzhiyev (United Russia), incumbent Member of State Duma (2011–present) (lost the primary)
- Khabibulla Magomedov (United Russia), Member of People's Assembly of the Republic of Dagestan (2021–present), energy construction executive (lost the primary)

==== Results ====
Summary of the 18-20 September 2026 Russian legislative election in the Derbent constituency
Candidate	Party	Votes	%
Khizri Abakarov	United Russia	486,261	89.80%
Makhmud Makhmudov	Communist Party	26,780	4.95%
Marat Aliyarov	A Just Russia	13,527	2.50%
Shakhnavaz Guseinov	Liberal Democratic Party	5,796	1.07%
Zebiyula Sefibekov	New People	4,684	0.86%
Albert Esedov	Yabloko	3,240	0.60%
Total		541,509	100%
