= Tsundimakhi =

Tsundimakhi Цундимахи ЦIундимахьи
- Selo
- Location within Republic of Dagestan Location within Russia
- Coordinates: 42°15′N 47°18′E
- Country: Russia
- Region: Republic of Dagestan
- District: Akushinsky District
- Time zone: UTC+3:00

Tsundimakhi (Russian: Цундимахи; Dargwa: ЦIундимахьи) is a rural locality (a selo) in Dubrimakhinsky Selsoviet, Akushinsky District, Republic of Dagestan, Russia. The population was 356 as of 2010. There are two streets.

== Geography ==
Tsundimakhi is located 5 km southeast of Akusha, the district's administrative centre, by road, along the Gandara River. Khazhnimakhi is the nearest rural locality.
