= Tserkhimakhi =

Tserkhimakhi Церхимахи Цергимахьи
- Selo
- Location within Republic of Dagestan Location within Russia
- Coordinates: 42°16′N 47°20′E
- Country: Russia
- Region: Republic of Dagestan
- District: Akushinsky District
- Time zone: UTC+3:00

Tserkhimakhi (Russian: Церхимахи; Dargwa: Цергимахьи) is a rural locality (a selo) in Akushinsky Selsoviet, Akushinsky District, Republic of Dagestan, Russia. The population was 492 as of 2010. There are 39 streets.

== Geography ==
Tserkhimakhi is located near Akusha (the district's administrative centre) by road.
