= Kurimakhi =

Kurimakhi Куримахи Куримахьи
- Selo
- Location within Republic of Dagestan Location within Russia
- Coordinates: 42°15′N 47°17′E
- Country: Russia
- Region: Republic of Dagestan
- District: Akushinsky District
- Time zone: UTC+3:00

Kurimakhi (Russian: Куримахи; Dargwa: Куримахьи) is a rural locality (a selo) in Urkhuchimakhinsky Selsoviet, Akushinsky District, Republic of Dagestan, Russia. The population was 1,144 as of 2010.

== Geography ==
Kurimakhi is located 7 km northwest of Akusha (the district's administrative centre) by road, on the Akusha River. Urgumakhi is the nearest rural locality.
