= Ginta, Republic of Dagestan =

Ginta Гинта ХIинтIа
- Selo
- Location within Republic of Dagestan Location within Russia
- Coordinates: 42°12′N 47°25′E
- Country: Russia
- Region: Republic of Dagestan
- District: Akushinsky District
- Time zone: UTC+3:00

Ginta (Russian: Гинта; Dargwa: ХIинтIа) is a rural locality (a selo) in Akushinsky District, Republic of Dagestan, Russia. The population was 1,535 as of 2010. There are 6 streets.

== Geography ==
Ginta is located 14 km southeast of Akusha (the district's administrative centre) by road, on the Dargolakotta River. Kurkimakhi is the nearest rural locality.
