= Urzhagimakhi =

Urzhagimakhi Уржагимахи Уржагимахьи
- Selo
- Location within Republic of Dagestan Location within Russia
- Coordinates: 42°03′N 47°22′E
- Country: Russia
- Region: Republic of Dagestan
- District: Akushinsky District
- Time zone: UTC+3:00

Urzhagimakhi (Russian: Уржагимахи; Dargwa: Уржагимахьи) is a rural locality (a selo) in Natsinsky Selsoviet, Akushinsky District, Republic of Dagestan, Russia. The population was 129 as of 2010. There are 5 streets.

== Geography ==
Urzhagimakhi is located 36 km south of Akusha (the district's administrative centre) by road. Natsi is the nearest rural locality.
