= Shinkbalakada =

Shinkbalakada Шинкбалакада Шинкьбалакъада
- Selo
- Location within Republic of Dagestan Location within Russia
- Coordinates: 42°16′N 47°17′E
- Country: Russia
- Region: Republic of Dagestan
- District: Akushinsky District
- Time zone: UTC+3:00

Shinkbalakada (Russian: Шинкбалакада; Dargwa: Шинкьбалакъада) is a rural locality (a selo) in Dubrimakhinsky Selsoviet, Akushinsky District, Republic of Dagestan, Russia. The population was 306 as of 2010.

== Geography ==
Shinkbalakada is located 6 km southeast of Akusha (the district's administrative centre) by road, on the Inki River. Kamkadamakhi is the nearest rural locality.
