= Urgani =

Urgani Ургани
- Selo
- Location within Republic of Dagestan Location within Russia
- Coordinates: 42°08′N 47°21′E
- Country: Russia
- Region: Republic of Dagestan
- District: Akushinsky District
- Time zone: UTC+3:00

Urgani (Russian: Ургани) is a rural locality (a selo) in Tsugninsky Selsoviet, Akushinsky District, Republic of Dagestan, Russia. The population was 407 as of 2010. There are 23 streets.

== Geography ==
Urgani is located 25 km south of Akusha (the district's administrative centre) by road, on the Tsugnikotta River. Gulebki is the nearest rural locality.
