= Chinimakhi =

Chinimakhi Чинимахи ЧIигIнимахьи
- Selo
- Location within Republic of Dagestan Location within Russia
- Coordinates: 42°16′N 47°22′E
- Country: Russia
- Region: Republic of Dagestan
- District: Akushinsky District
- Time zone: UTC+3:00

Chinimakhi (Russian: Чинимахи; Dargwa: ЧIигIнимахьи) is a rural locality (a selo) in Burgimakmakhinsky Selsoviet, Akushinsky District, Republic of Dagestan, Russia. The population was 916 as of 2010. There are 3 streets.

== Geography ==
Chinimakhi is located 10 km east of Akusha (the district's administrative centre) by road. Chankalamakhi is the nearest rural locality.
