= Tsugni =

Tsugni Цугни
- Selo
- Location within Republic of Dagestan Location within Russia
- Coordinates: 42°06′N 47°24′E
- Country: Russia
- Region: Republic of Dagestan
- District: Akushinsky District
- Time zone: UTC+3:00

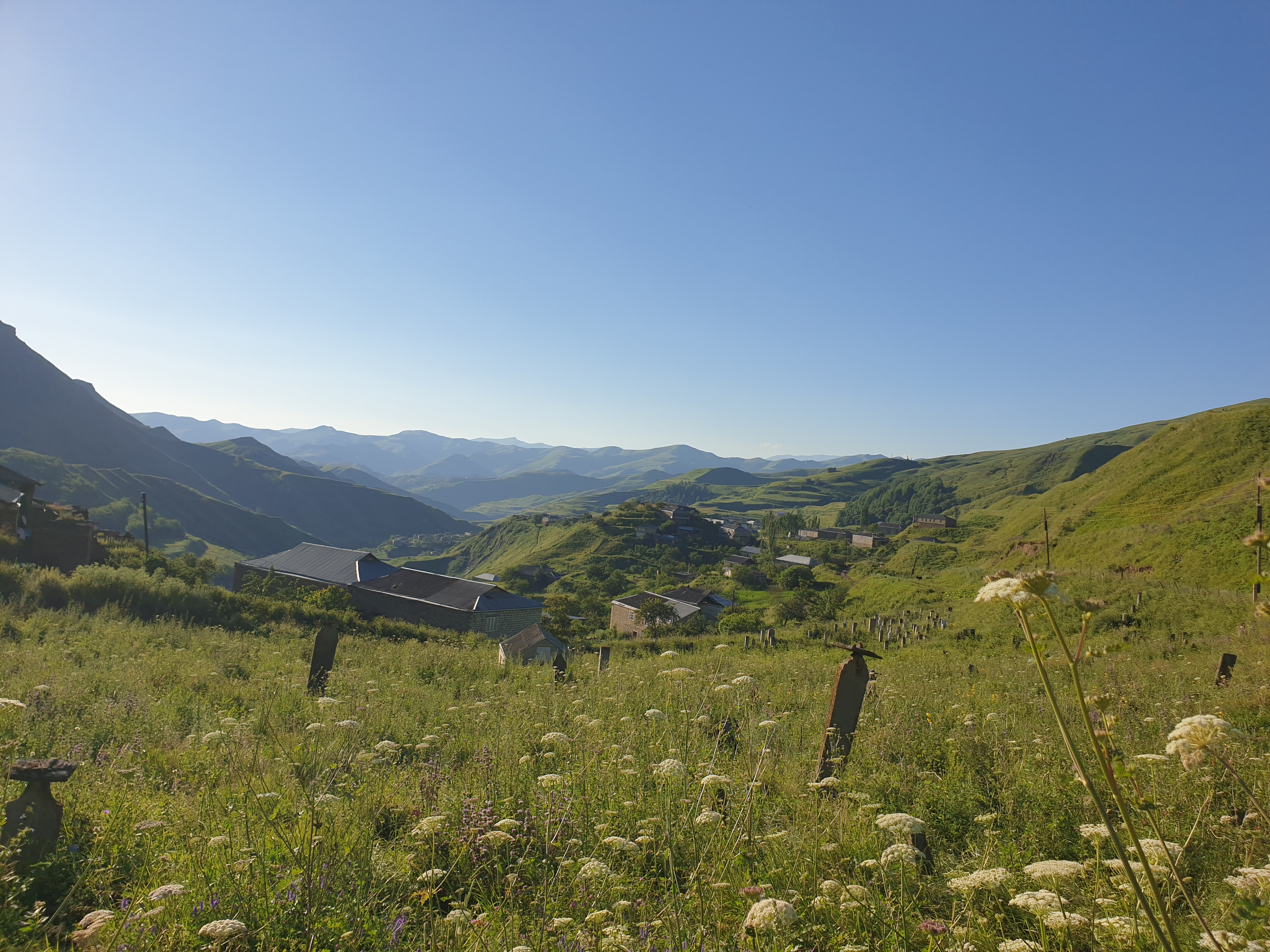
The village of Tsugni in the Akushinsky district of Dagestan, view from Gulebka

Tsugni (Russian: Цугни) is a rural locality (a selo) and the administrative centre of Tsugninsky Selsoviet, Akushinsky District, Republic of Dagestan, Russia. The population was 748 as of 2010. There are 15 streets.

== Geography ==
Tsugni is located 31 km south of Akusha (the district's administrative centre) by road, on the Tsugnikherk River. Gulebki is the nearest rural locality.
