= Gubden =

Gubden Губден Губдани
- Selo
- Location within Republic of Dagestan Location within Russia
- Coordinates: 42°33′N 47°33′E
- Country: Russia
- Region: Republic of Dagestan
- District: Karabudakhkentsky District
- Time zone: UTC+3:00

Gubden (Russian: Губден; Dargwa: Губдани) is a rural locality (a selo) and the administrative centre of Gubdensky Selsoviet, Karabudakhkentsky District, Republic of Dagestan, Russia. The population was 2,798 as of 2010. There are 37 streets.

== Demography ==
Dargins form the majority of the population of Gubden.

== History ==
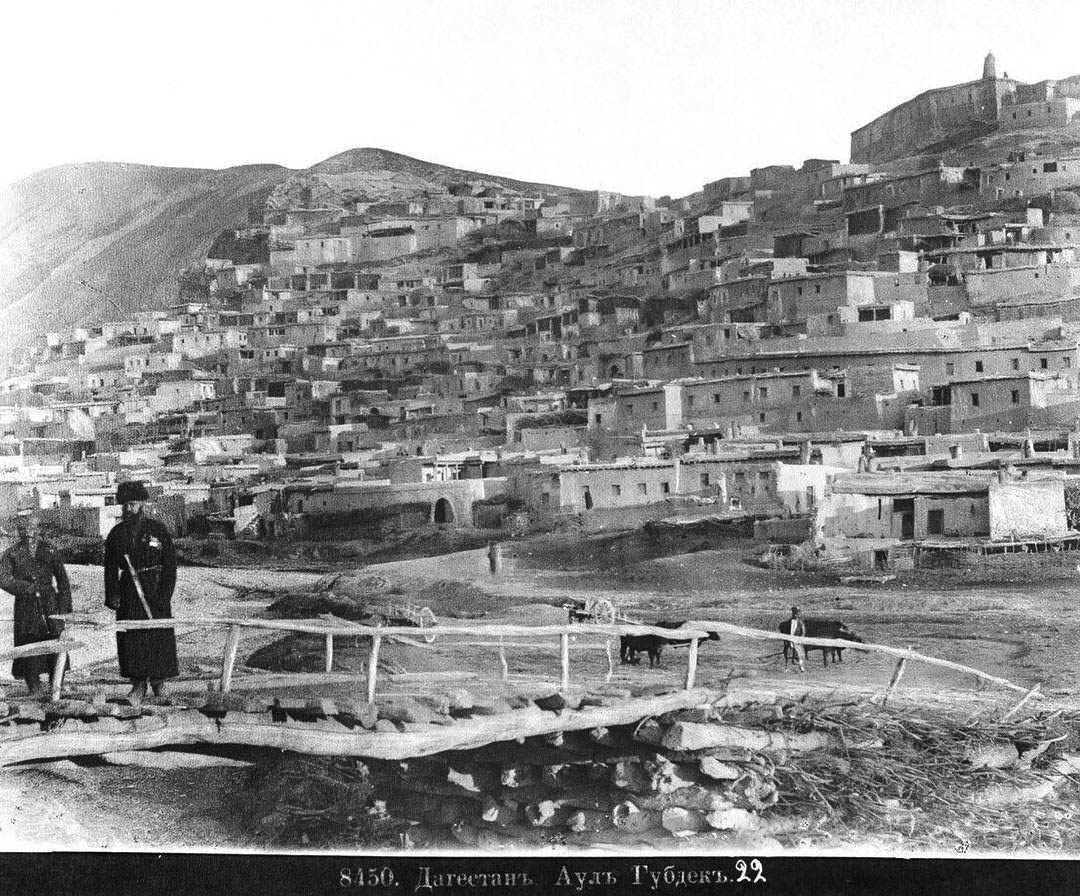
Gubden in the 19th century

In the past Gubden was one of the most important settlements of Dagestan.

== Geography ==
Gubden is located 18 km south of Karabudakhkent (the district's administrative centre) by road. Gurbuki and Kadirkent are the nearest rural localities.

== Famous residents ==
- Yusuf Khadzhi al-Gubdani (scholar and physician)
- Magomed Abdullayev (professor, orientalist, doctor of philosophy)
- Abdulmalik Magomedov (Hero of Russia)
- Nurmagomed Shanavazov (former boxer)
- Abdulnasyr Medzhikov (world champion in muay thai)
- Salimgerey Rasulov (mixed martial arts fighter)
- Darsam Dzhaparov (International Master of Sports of Russia)
