= Gapshima =

Gapshima Гапшима ХIябшима
- Selo
- Location within Republic of Dagestan Location within Russia
- Coordinates: 42°12′N 47°19′E
- Country: Russia
- Region: Republic of Dagestan
- District: Akushinsky District
- Time zone: UTC+3:00

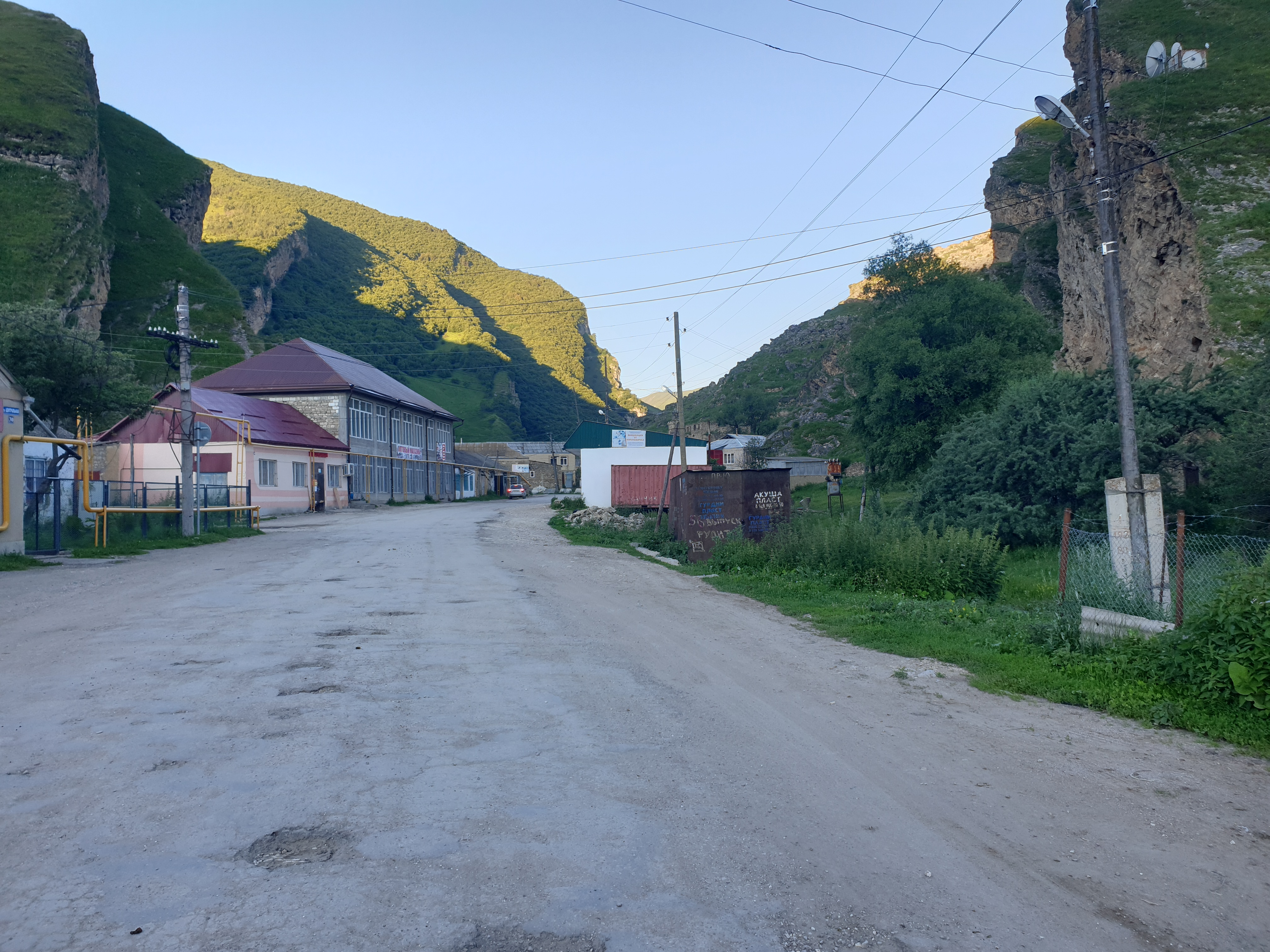
The village of Gapshima in the Akushinsky District of Dagestan

Gapshima (Russian: Гапшима; Dargwa: ХIябшима) is a rural locality (a selo) in Akushinsky District, Republic of Dagestan, Russia. The population was 1,709 as of 2010. There are 31 streets.

== Geography ==
Gapshima is located 10 km southwest of Akusha (the district's administrative centre) by road, on the Akusha River. Shukty is the nearest rural locality.
