= Butri, Republic of Dagestan =

Butri Бутри
- Selo
- Location within Republic of Dagestan Location within Russia
- Coordinates: 42°10′N 47°25′E
- Country: Russia
- Region: Republic of Dagestan
- District: Akushinsky District
- Time zone: UTC+3:00

Butri (Russian: Бутри) is a rural locality (a selo) in Akushinsky District, Republic of Dagestan, Russia. The population was 1,097 as of 2010. There are 14 streets.

== Geography ==
Butri is located 16 km southeast of Akusha (the district's administrative centre) by road, on the Dargolakotta River. Ginta is the nearest rural locality.
