= Kubrimakhi =

Kubrimakhi Кубримахи Кубримахьи
- Selo
- Location within Republic of Dagestan Location within Russia
- Coordinates: 42°15′N 47°17′E
- Country: Russia
- Region: Republic of Dagestan
- District: Akushinsky District
- Time zone: UTC+3:00

Kubrimakhi (Russian: Кубримахи; Dargwa: Кубримахьи) is a rural locality (a selo) in Natsinsky Selsoviet, Akushinsky District, Republic of Dagestan, Russia. The population was 17 as of 2010.

== Geography ==
Kubrimakhi is located 38 km south of Akusha (the district's administrative centre) by road. Tuzlamakhi is the nearest rural locality.
