= Tebekmakhi =

Tebekmakhi Тебекмахи Тӏебекмахьи
- Selo
- Location within Republic of Dagestan Location within Russia
- Coordinates: 42°20′N 47°12′E
- Country: Russia
- Region: Republic of Dagestan
- District: Akushinsky District
- Time zone: UTC+3:00

Tebekmakhi (Russian: Тебекмахи; Dargwa: Тӏебекмахьи) is a rural locality (a selo) and the administrative centre of Tebekmakhinsky Selsoviet, Akushinsky District, Republic of Dagestan, Russia. The population was 2,278 as of 2010. There are 19 streets.

== Geography ==
Tebekmakhi is located 18 km northwest of Akusha (the district's administrative centre) by road, on the Akusha River. Kurkabi is the nearest rural locality.
