= Shukty =

Shukty Шукты Шукьта
- Selo
- Location within Republic of Dagestan Location within Russia
- Coordinates: 42°13′N 47°18′E
- Country: Russia
- Region: Republic of Dagestan
- District: Akushinsky District
- Time zone: UTC+3:00

Shukty (Russian: Шукты; Dargwa: Шукьта) is a rural locality (a selo) and the administrative centre of Shuktynsky Selsoviet, Akushinsky District, Republic of Dagestan, Russia. The population was 613 as of 2010. There are 6 streets.

== Geography ==
Shukty is located 11 km southwest of Akusha (the district's administrative centre) by road. Galshima is the nearest rural locality.
