= Usisha =

Usisha Усиша
- Selo
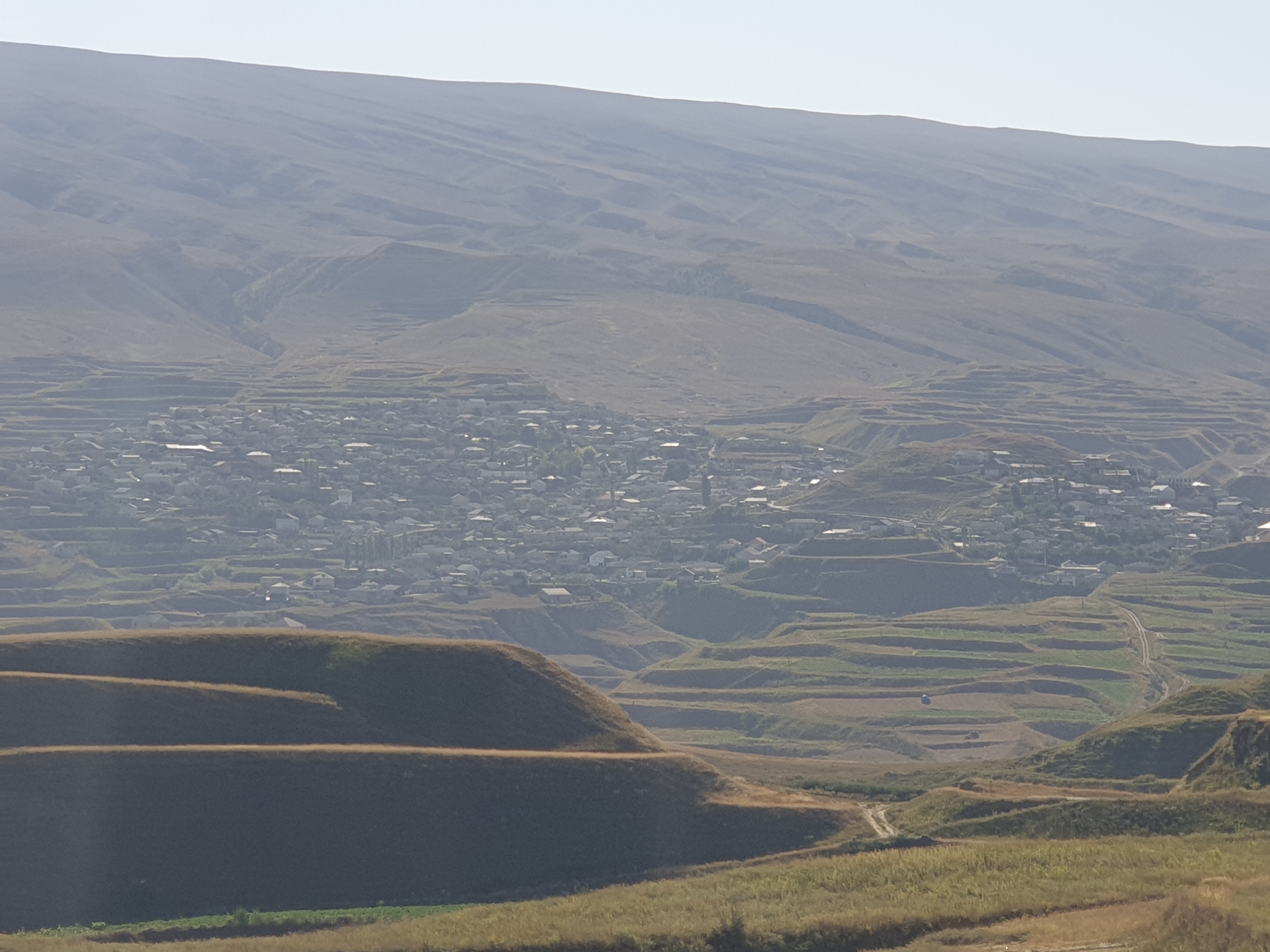

- Location within Republic of Dagestan Location within Russia
- Coordinates: 42°15′N 47°23′E
- Country: Russia
- Region: Republic of Dagestan
- District: Akushinsky District
- Time zone: UTC+3:00

Usisha (Russian: Усиша) is a rural locality (a selo) and the administrative centre of Usishinsky Selsoviet, Akushinsky District, Republic of Dagestan, Russia. The population was 3,932 as of 2010. The locality has 12 streets.

== Geography ==
Usisha is located 8 km southeast of Akusha (the district's administrative centre) by road. Aynikabmakhi is the nearest rural locality.
