= Inzimakhi =

Inzimakhi Инзимахи Инзимахьи
- Selo
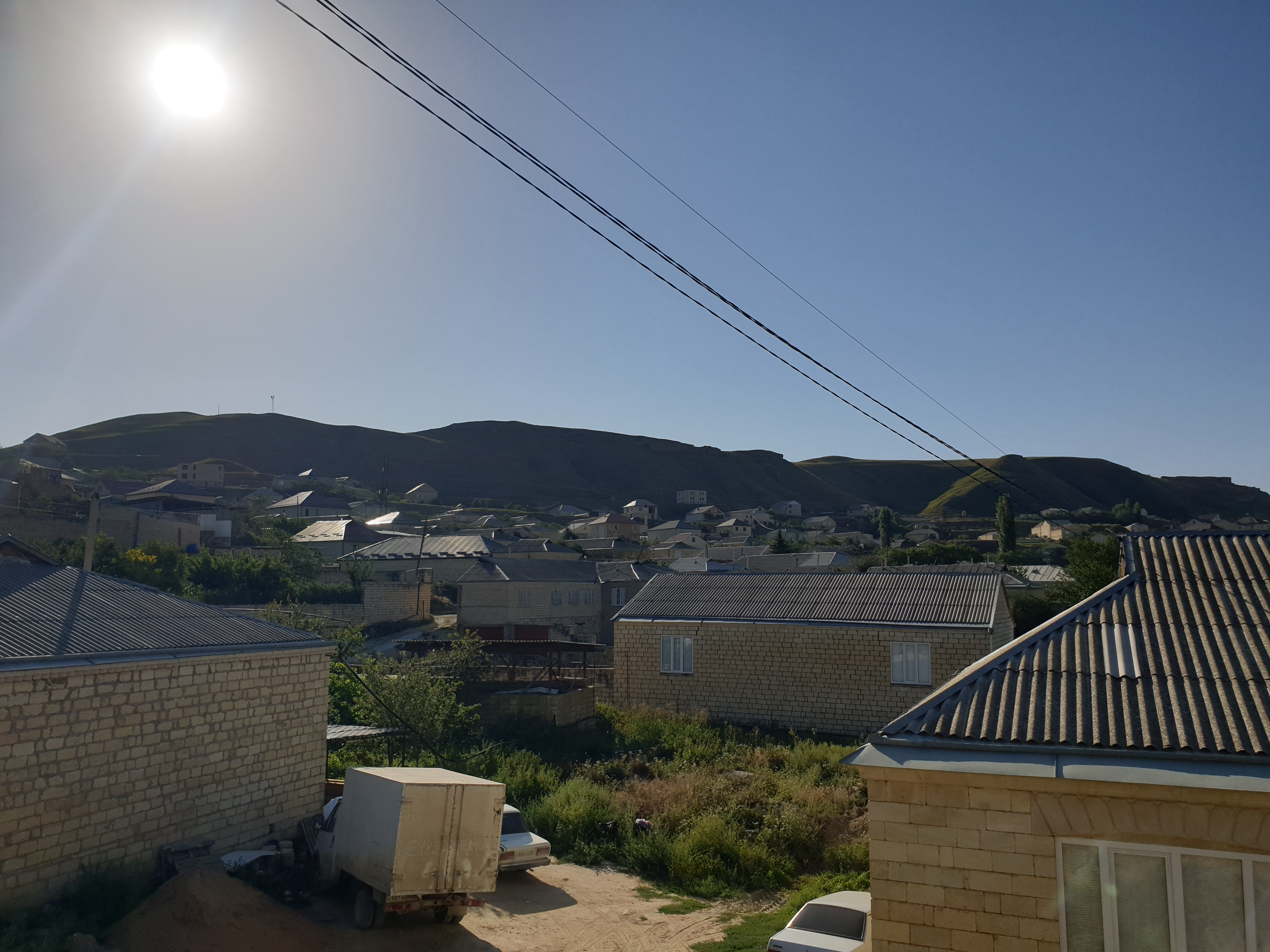

- Location within Republic of Dagestan Location within Russia
- Coordinates: 42°16′N 47°21′E
- Country: Russia
- Region: Republic of Dagestan
- District: Akushinsky District
- Time zone: UTC+3:00

Inzimakhi (Russian: Инзимахи; Dargwa: Инзимахьи) is a rural locality (a selo) in Akushinsky Selsoviet, Akushinsky District, Republic of Dagestan, Russia. The population was 1,383 as of 2010. There are 31 streets.

== Geography ==
Inzimakhi is located on the right bank of the Akusha River, 2 km southeast of Akusha (the district's administrative centre) by road. Karsha is the nearest rural locality.
