= Gerkhmakhi =

Gerkhmakhi Герхмахи Хӏерхмахьи
- Selo
- Location within Republic of Dagestan Location within Russia
- Coordinates: 42°15′N 47°31′E
- Country: Russia
- Region: Republic of Dagestan
- District: Akushinsky District
- Time zone: UTC+3:00

Gerkhmakhi (Russian: Герхмахи; Dargwa: Хӏерхмахьи) is a rural locality (a selo) in Akushinsky District, Republic of Dagestan, Russia. The population was 2,087 as of 2010. There are 6 streets.

== Geography ==
Gerkhmakhi is located 23 km east of Akusha (the district's administrative centre) by road. Verkhniye Mulebki is the nearest rural locality.
