= Utsilimakhi =

Utsulimakhi Уцулимахи Уцулимахьи
- Selo
- Location within Republic of Dagestan Location within Russia
- Coordinates: 42°03′N 47°25′E
- Country: Russia
- Region: Republic of Dagestan
- District: Akushinsky District
- Time zone: UTC+3:00

Utsulimakhi (Russian: Уцулимахи; Dargwa: Уцулимахьи) is a rural locality (a selo) in Nakhkinsky Selsoviet, Akushinsky District, Republic of Dagestan, Russia. The population was 159 as of 2010. There are 2 streets.

== Geography ==
Utsulimakhi is located 42 km southeast of Akusha (the district's administrative centre) by road, on the Karakotta River. Butulta is the nearest rural locality.
