= Kamkadamakhi =

Kamkadamakhi Камкадамахи Къамкъадамахьи
- Selo
- Location within Republic of Dagestan Location within Russia
- Coordinates: 42°15′N 47°18′E
- Country: Russia
- Region: Republic of Dagestan
- District: Akushinsky District
- Time zone: UTC+3:00

Kamkadamakhi (Russian: Камкадамахи; Dargwa: Къамкъадамахьи) is a rural locality (a selo) in Dubrimakhinsky Selsoviet, Akushinsky District, Republic of Dagestan, Russia. The population was 285 as of 2010.

== Geography ==
Kamkadamakhi is located 6 km southeast of Akusha (the district's administrative centre) by road, on the Inki River. Khenklakar is the nearest rural locality.
