= Tsulikana =

Tsulikana Цуликана ЦIуликъана
- Selo
- Location within Republic of Dagestan Location within Russia
- Coordinates: 42°15′N 47°15′E
- Country: Russia
- Region: Republic of Dagestan
- District: Akushinsky District
- Time zone: UTC+3:00

Tsulikana (Russian: Цуликана; Dargwa: ЦIуликъана) is a rural locality (a selo) in Shuktynsky Selsoviet, Akushinsky District, Republic of Dagestan, Russia. The population was 261 as of 2010. There are 3 streets.

== Geography ==
Tsulikana is located 18 km west of Akusha (the district's administrative centre) by road. Dubrimakhi is the nearest rural locality.
