= Kaddamakhi =

Kaddamakhi Каддамахи Къаддамахьи
- Selo
- Location within Republic of Dagestan Location within Russia
- Coordinates: 42°02′N 47°21′E
- Country: Russia
- Region: Republic of Dagestan
- District: Akushinsky District
- Time zone: UTC+3:00

Kaddamakhi (Russian: Каддамахи; Dargwa: Къаддамахьи) is a rural locality (a selo) in Kassagumakhinsky Selsoviet, Akushinsky District, Republic of Dagestan, Russia. The population was 94 as of 2010. There are 2 streets.

== Geography ==
Kaddamakhi is located 39 km south of Akusha, the district's administrative centre, by road, on the Khunikotta River. Bikalamakhi is the nearest rural locality.
