= Dzhanga =

Dzhanga Джанга Джангани
- Selo
- Location within Republic of Dagestan Location within Russia
- Coordinates: 42°31′N 47°45′E
- Country: Russia
- Region: Republic of Dagestan
- District: Karabudakhkentsky District
- Time zone: UTC+3:00

Dzhanga (Russian: Джанга; Dargwa: Джангани) is a rural locality (a selo) in Gubdensky Selsoviet, Karabudakhkentsky District, Republic of Dagestan, Russia. The population was 1,203 as of 2010. There are 9 streets.

== Geography ==
Dzhanga is located 37 km southeast of Karabudakhkent (the district's administrative centre) by road. Siragi and Leninkent are the nearest rural localities.

== Nationalities ==
Dargin people live there.
