= Giyagaramakhi =

Giyagaramakhi Гиягарамахи Гиягарамахьи
- Selo
- Location within Republic of Dagestan Location within Russia
- Coordinates: 42°05′N 47°22′E
- Country: Russia
- Region: Republic of Dagestan
- District: Akushinsky District
- Time zone: UTC+3:00

Giyagaramakhi (Russian: Гиягарамахи; Dargwa: Гиягарамахьи) is a rural locality (a selo) in Natsinsky Selsoviet, Akushinsky District, Republic of Dagestan, Russia. The population was 71 as of 2010. There are 2 streets.

== Geography ==
Giyagaramakhi is located 30 km south of Akusha (the district's administrative centre) by road. Tuzlamakhi is the nearest rural locality.
