= Kakmakhi =

Kakmakhi Какмахи Кьякьмахьи
- Selo
- Location within Republic of Dagestan Location within Russia
- Coordinates: 42°17′N 47°23′E
- Country: Russia
- Region: Republic of Dagestan
- District: Akushinsky District
- Time zone: UTC+3:00

Kakmakhi (Russian: Какмахи; Dargwa: Кьякьмахьи) is a rural locality (a selo) in Burgimakmakhinsky Selsoviet, Akushinsky District, Republic of Dagestan, Russia. The population was 616 as of 2010.

== Geography ==
Kakmakhi is located 8 km northeast of Akusha (the district's administrative centre) by road. Burgimakmakhi is the nearest rural locality.
