= Murlatinamakhi =

Murlatinamakhi Мурлатинамахи Мурлатинамахьи
- Selo
- Location within Republic of Dagestan Location within Russia
- Coordinates: 42°05′N 47°21′E
- Country: Russia
- Region: Republic of Dagestan
- District: Akushinsky District
- Time zone: UTC+3:00

Murlatinamakhi (Russian: Мурлатинамахи; Dargwa: Мурлатинамахьи) is a rural locality (a selo) in Natsinsky Selsoviet, Akushinsky District, Republic of Dagestan, Russia. The population was 29 as of 2010.

== Geography ==
Murlatinamakhi is located 34 km south of Akusha (the district's administrative centre) by road. Karayamakhi is the nearest rural locality.
