= Kassagumakhi =

Kassagumakhi Кассагумахи Кьассагумахьи
- Selo
- Location within Republic of Dagestan Location within Russia
- Coordinates: 42°02′N 47°22′E
- Country: Russia
- Region: Republic of Dagestan
- District: Akushinsky District
- Time zone: UTC+3:00

Kassagumakhi (Russian: Кассагумахи; Dargwa: Кьассагумахьи) is a rural locality (a selo) and the administrative centre of Kassagumakhinsky Selsoviet, Akushinsky District, Republic of Dagestan, Russia. The population was 138 as of 2010. There are 6 streets.

== Geography ==
Kassagumakhi is located 37 km south of Akusha (the district's administrative centre) by road, on the Khunikotta River. Gunnamakhi is the nearest rural locality.
