= Urgubamakhi =

Urgubamakhi Ургубамахи Ургубамахьи
- Selo
- Location within Republic of Dagestan Location within Russia
- Coordinates: 42°17′N 47°19′E
- Country: Russia
- Federal subject: Republic of Dagestan
- District: Akushinsky District
- Time zone: UTC+3:00

Urgubamakhi (Russian: Ургубамахи; Dargwa: Ургубамахьи) is a rural locality (a selo) in Akushinsky Selsoviet, Akushinsky District, Republic of Dagestan, Russia. The population was 1,069 as of 2010. There are 19 streets.

== Geography ==
Urgubamakhi is located 3 km northwest of Akusha (the district's administrative centre) by road. Tserkhimakhi is the nearest rural locality.
