= Adanak =

Adanak Аданак Аданакъ
- Selo
- Location within Republic of Dagestan Location within Russia
- Coordinates: 42°45′N 47°27′E
- Country: Russia
- Region: Republic of Dagestan
- District: Karabudakhkentsky District
- Time zone: UTC+3:00

Adanak (Russian: Аданак; Kumyk: Аданакъ, Adanaq) is a rural locality (a selo) in Karabudakhkentsky District, Republic of Dagestan, Russia. The population was 1,464 as of 2010. There are 11 streets.

== Geography ==
Adanak is located 14 km northwest of Karabudakhkent (the district's administrative centre) by road. Geli and Paraul are the nearest rural localities.

== Nationalities ==
Kumyks live there.
