= Siragi =

Siragi Сираги
- Selo
- Location within Republic of Dagestan Location within Russia
- Coordinates: 42°30′N 47°45′E
- Country: Russia
- Region: Republic of Dagestan
- District: Karabudakhkentsky District
- Time zone: UTC+3:00

Siragi (Russian: Сираги) is a rural locality (a selo) in Gubdensky Selsoviet, Karabudakhkentsky District, Republic of Dagestan, Russia. The population was 602 as of 2010. There are 3 streets.

== Geography ==
Siragi is located 39 km southeast of Karabudakhkent (the district's administrative centre) by road. Dzhanga and Leninkent are the nearest rural localities.

== Nationalities ==
Dargins live there.
