= Kurkimakhi =

Kurkimakhi Куркимахи Куркимахьи
- Selo
- Location within Republic of Dagestan Location within Russia
- Coordinates: 42°12′N 47°25′E
- Country: Russia
- Region: Republic of Dagestan
- District: Akushinsky District
- Time zone: UTC+3:00

Kurkimakhi (Russian: Куркимахи; Dargwa: Куркимахьи) is a rural locality (a selo) in Akushinsky District, Republic of Dagestan, Russia. The population was 396 as of 2010. There are 3 streets.

== Geography ==
Kurkimakhi is located 13 km southeast of Akusha (the district's administrative centre) by road, on the Dargolakotta River. Ginta is the nearest rural locality.
