= Kavkamakhi =

Kavkamakhi Кавкамахи Кабка-махьи
- Selo
- Location within Republic of Dagestan Location within Russia
- Coordinates: 42°19′N 47°18′E
- Country: Russia
- Region: Republic of Dagestan
- District: Akushinsky District
- Time zone: UTC+3:00

Kavkamakhi (Russian: Кавкамахи; Dargwa: Кабка-махьи) is a rural locality (a selo) in Akushinsky District, Republic of Dagestan, Russia. The population was 1,408 as of 2010. There are 11 streets.

== Geography ==
Kavkamakhi is located 9 km northwest of Akusha (the district's administrative centre) by road, on the Akusha River. Kurimakhi is the nearest rural locality.
