= Chankalamakhi =

Chankalamakhi Чанкаламахи ЧIянкIаламахьи
- Selo
- Location within Republic of Dagestan Location within Russia
- Coordinates: 42°16′N 47°21′E
- Country: Russia
- Region: Republic of Dagestan
- District: Akushinsky District
- Time zone: UTC+3:00

Chankalamakhi (Russian: Чанкаламахи; Dargwa: ЧIянкIаламахьи) is a rural locality (a selo) in Akushinsky Selsoviet, Akushinsky District, Republic of Dagestan, Russia. The population was 381 as of 2010.

== Geography ==
Chankalamakhi is located 3 km east of Akusha (the district's administrative centre) by road. Inzimakhi is the nearest rural locality.
