= Gunnamakhi =

Gunnamakhi Гуннамахи Гъуннамахьи
- Selo
- Location within Republic of Dagestan Location within Russia
- Coordinates: 42°02′N 47°21′E
- Country: Russia
- Region: Republic of Dagestan
- District: Akushinsky District
- Time zone: UTC+3:00

Gunnamakhi (Russian: Гуннамахи; Dargwa: Гъуннамахьи) is a rural locality (a selo) in Kassagumakhinsky Selsoviet, Akushinsky District, Republic of Dagestan, Russia. The population was 57 as of 2010.

== Geography ==
Gunnamakhi is located 37 km south of Akusha (the district's administrative centre) by road, on the Khunikotta River. Kassagumakhi is the nearest rural locality.
