= Tsunimakhi =

Tsunimakhi Цунимахи ЦIунимахьи
- Selo
- Location within Republic of Dagestan Location within Russia
- Coordinates: 42°17′N 47°15′E
- Country: Russia
- Region: Republic of Dagestan
- District: Akushinsky District
- Time zone: UTC+3:00

Tsunimakhi (Russian: Цунимахи; Dargwa: ЦIунимахьи) is a rural locality (a selo) in Urkhuchimakhinsky Selsoviet, Akushinsky District, Republic of Dagestan, Russia. The population was 481 as of 2010.

== Geography ==
Tsunimakhi is located 13 km northwest of Akusha (the district's administrative centre) by road, on the Inki River. Shumkhrimakhi is the nearest rural locality.
