= Bikalamakhi =

Bikalamakhi Бикаламахи БикIаламахьи
- Selo
- Location within Republic of Dagestan Location within Russia
- Coordinates: 42°02′N 47°21′E
- Country: Russia
- Region: Republic of Dagestan
- District: Akushinsky District
- Time zone: UTC+3:00

Bikalamakhi (Russian: Бикаламахи; Dargwa: БикIаламахьи) is a rural locality (a selo) in Kassagumakhinsky Selsoviet, Akushinsky District, Republic of Dagestan, Russia. The population was 54 as of 2010.

== Geography ==
Bikalamakhi is located 38 km south of Akusha (the district's administrative centre) by road, on the Khunikotta River. Kaddamakhi is the nearest rural locality.
