= Karsha, Republic of Dagestan =

Karsha Карша Хъарша
- Selo
- Location within Republic of Dagestan Location within Russia
- Coordinates: 42°15′N 47°20′E
- Country: Russia
- Region: Republic of Dagestan
- District: Akushinsky District
- Time zone: UTC+3:00

Karsha (Russian: Карша; Dargwa: Хъарша) is a rural locality (a selo) in Akushinsky Selsoviet, Akushinsky District, Republic of Dagestan, Russia. The population was 1,234 as of 2010. There are 23 streets.

== Geography ==
Karsha is one kilometre south of Akusha (the district's administrative centre) by road. Akusha is the nearest rural locality.
