= Alikhanmakhi =

Alikhanmakhi Алиханмахи Гӏялиханмахьи
- Selo
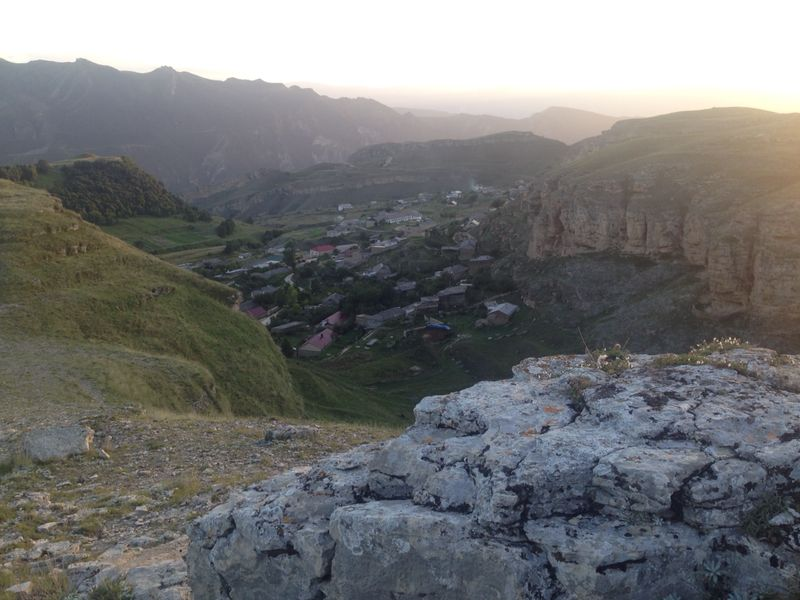
- Alikhanmakhi

- Location within Republic of Dagestan Location within Russia
- Coordinates: 42°19′N 47°15′E
- Country: Russia
- Region: Republic of Dagestan
- District: Akushinsky District
- Time zone: UTC+3:00

Alikhanmakhi (Russian: Алиханмахи; Dargwa: Гӏялиханмахьи) is a rural locality (a selo) and the administrative centre of Alikhanmakhinsky Selsoviet, Akushinsky District, Republic of Dagestan, Russia. The population was 826 in 2010. There are eight streets.

== Geography ==
Alikhanmakhi is located on the Akusha River, 22 kilometres (14 mi) northwest of Akusha (the district's administrative centre) by road. Guladtymakhi is the nearest rural locality.
