= Bukkamakhi =

Bukkamakhi Буккамахи Букъамахьи
- Selo
- Location within Republic of Dagestan Location within Russia
- Coordinates: 42°01′N 47°25′E
- Country: Russia
- Region: Republic of Dagestan
- District: Akushinsky District
- Time zone: UTC+3:00

Bukkamakhi (Russian: Буккамахи; Dargwa: Букъамахьи) is a rural locality (a selo) in Kassagumakhinsky Selsoviet, Akushinsky District, Republic of Dagestan, Russia. The population was 62 as of 2010.

== Geography ==
Bukkamakhi is located 47 km south of Akusha (the district's administrative centre) by road, on the Karakotta River. Karashimakhi is the nearest rural locality.
