= Natsi, Republic of Dagestan =

Natsi Наци НяхIцIa
- Selo
- Location within Republic of Dagestan Location within Russia
- Coordinates: 42°04′N 47°23′E
- Country: Russia
- Region: Republic of Dagestan
- District: Akushinsky District
- Time zone: UTC+3:00

Natsi (Russian: Наци; Dargwa: НяхIцIa) is a rural locality (a selo) and the administrative centre of Natsinsky Selsoviet, Akushinsky District, Republic of Dagestan, Russia. The population was 149 as of 2010. There are 5 streets.

== Geography ==
Natsi is located 35 km south of Akusha (the district's administrative centre) by road. Nakhki is the nearest rural locality.
