= Uznimakhi =

Uznimakhi Узнимахи Узнимахьи
- Selo
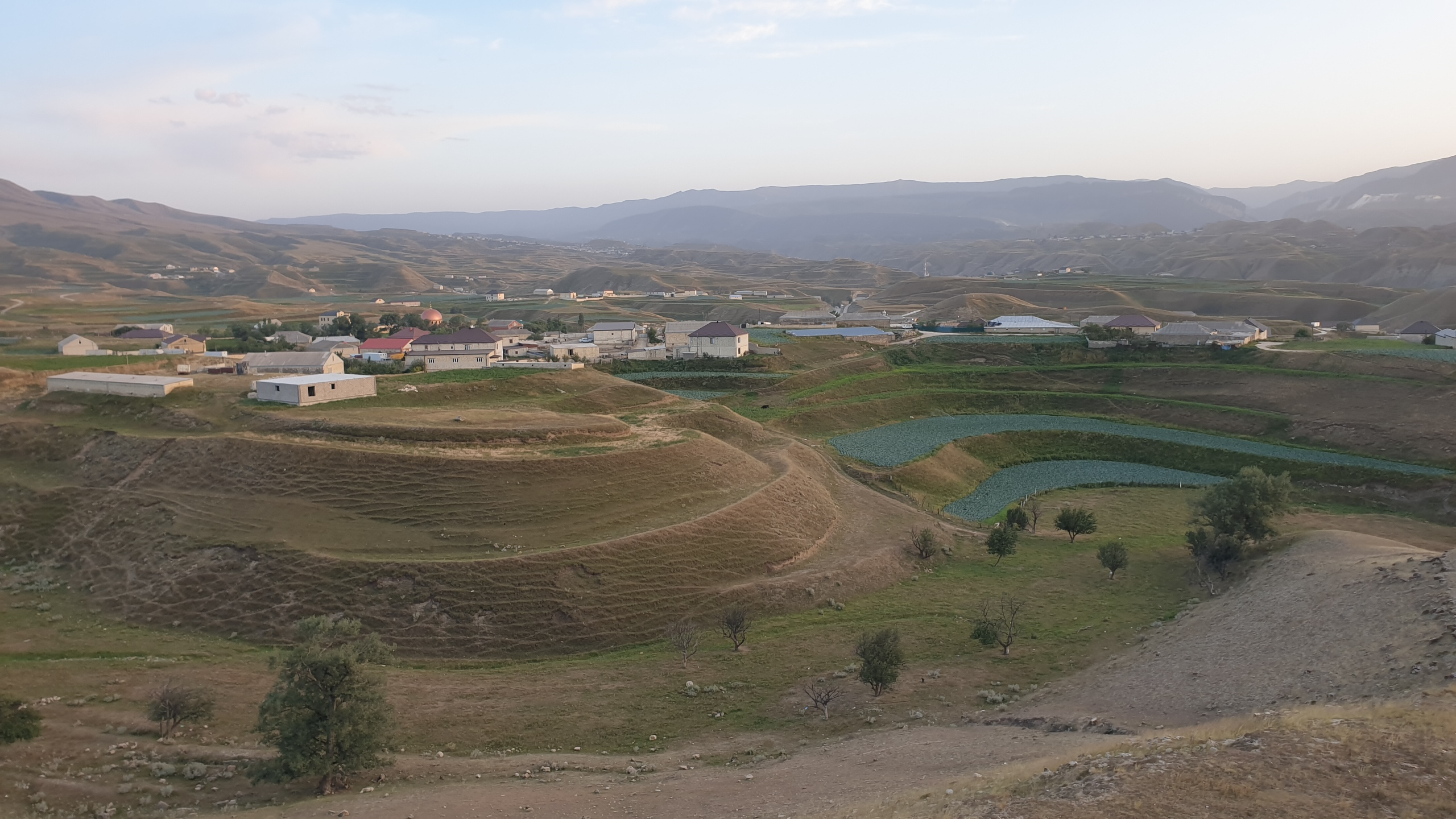

- Location within Republic of Dagestan Location within Russia
- Coordinates: 42°18′N 47°23′E
- Country: Russia
- Region: Republic of Dagestan
- District: Akushinsky District
- Time zone: UTC+3:00

Uznimakhi (Russian: Узнимахи; Dargwa: Узнимахьи) is a rural locality (a selo) in Burgimakmakhinsky Selsoviet, Akushinsky District, Republic of Dagestan, Russia. The population was 910 as of 2010.

== Geography ==
Uznimakhi is located 8 km northeast of Akusha (the district's administrative centre) by road. Verkhny Kavkamakhi is the nearest rural locality.
