= Kertukmakhi =

Kertukmakhi Кертукмахи Кертугмахьи
- Selo
- Location within Republic of Dagestan Location within Russia
- Coordinates: 42°17′N 47°20′E
- Country: Russia
- Region: Republic of Dagestan
- District: Akushinsky District
- Time zone: UTC+3:00

Kertukmakhi (Russian: Кертукмахи; Dargwa: Кертугмахьи) is a rural locality (a selo) in Akushinsky Selsoviet, Akushinsky District, Republic of Dagestan, Russia. The population was 662 as of 2010. There are 10 streets.

== Geography ==
Kertukmakhi is located on the right bank of the Akusha River, 3 km north of Akusha (the district's administrative centre) by road. Semgamakhi is the nearest rural locality.
