= Kuliyamakhi =

Kuliyamakhi Кулиямахи Кулиямахьи
- Selo
- Location within Republic of Dagestan Location within Russia
- Coordinates: 42°04′N 47°20′E
- Country: Russia
- Region: Republic of Dagestan
- District: Akushinsky District
- Time zone: UTC+3:00

Kuliyamakhi (Russian: Кулиямахи; Dargwa: Кулиямахьи) is a rural locality (a selo) in Natsinsky Selsoviet, Akushinsky District, Republic of Dagestan, Russia. The population was 210 as of 2010. There are 4 streets.

== Geography ==
Kuliyamakhi is located 38 km south of Akusha (the district's administrative centre) by road, on the Kalakherk River. Karayamakhi is the nearest rural locality.
