= Gulebki =

Gulebki Гулебки ГъулебкIи
- Selo
- Location within Republic of Dagestan Location within Russia
- Coordinates: 42°06′N 47°23′E
- Country: Russia
- Region: Republic of Dagestan
- District: Akushinsky District
- Time zone: UTC+3:00

Gulebki (Russian: Гулебки; Dargwa: ГъулебкIи) is a rural locality (a selo) in Tsugninsky Selsoviet, Akushinsky District, Republic of Dagestan, Russia. The population was 386 as of 2010. There are 6 streets.

== Geography ==
Gulebki is located 30 km southeast of Akusha (the district's administrative centre) by road, on the Tsugnikotta River. Tsugni is the nearest rural locality.
