= Urkhuchimakhi =

Urkhuchimakhi Урхучимахи Урхьучи-махьи
- Selo
- Location within Republic of Dagestan Location within Russia
- Coordinates: 42°18′N 47°15′E
- Country: Russia
- Region: Republic of Dagestan
- District: Akushinsky District
- Time zone: UTC+3:00

Urkhuchimakhi (Russian: Урхучимахи; Dargwa: Урхьучи-махьи) is a rural locality (a selo) and the administrative centre of Urkhuchimakhinsky Selsoviet, Akushinsky District, Republic of Dagestan, Russia. The population was 2,290 as of 2010. There are 8 streets.

== Geography ==
Urkhuchimakhi is located 11 km northwest of Akusha (the district's administrative centre) by road, on the Akusha River. Tsunimakhi is the nearest rural locality.
