= Burgimakmakhi =

Burgimakmakhi Бургимакмахи Бурхӏимякьмахьи
- Selo
- Location within Republic of Dagestan Location within Russia
- Coordinates: 42°17′N 47°22′E
- Country: Russia
- Region: Republic of Dagestan
- District: Akushinsky District
- Time zone: UTC+3:00

Burgimakmakhi (Russian: Бургимакмахи; Dargwa: Бурхӏимякьмахьи) is a rural locality (a selo) and the administrative centre of Burgimakmakhinsky Selsoviet, Akushinsky District, Republic of Dagestan, Russia. The population was 1,285 as of 2010. There are 3 streets.

== Geography ==
Burgimakmakhi is located 7 km northeast of Akusha (the district's administrative centre) by road. Kakmakhi is the nearest rural locality.
