= Gumramakhi =

Gumramakhi Гумрамахи Гумрамахьи
- Selo
- Location within Republic of Dagestan Location within Russia
- Coordinates: 42°15′N 47°20′E
- Country: Russia
- Region: Republic of Dagestan
- District: Akushinsky District
- Time zone: UTC+3:00

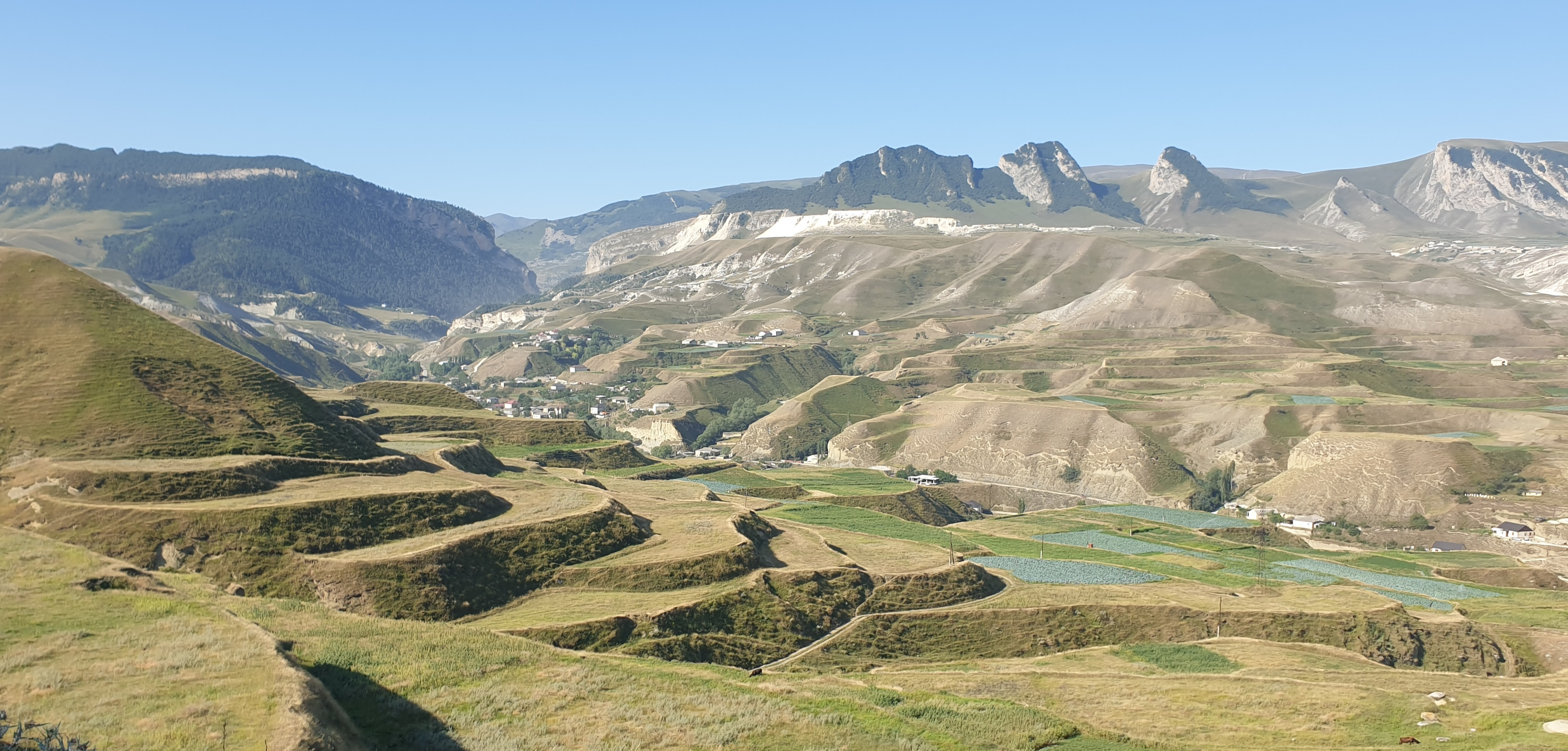
A picture of the village of Gumramakhi.

Gumramakhi (Russian: Гумрамахи; Dargwa: Гумрамахьи) is a rural locality (a selo) in Akushinsky Selsoviet, Akushinsky District, Republic of Dagestan, Russia. The population was 644 as of 2010. There are 16 streets.

== Geography ==
Gumramakhi is located on the left bank of the Akusha River, 4 km south of Akusha (the district's administrative centre) by road. Karsha is the nearest rural locality.
