= Semgamakhi =

Semgamakhi Семгамахи Семгамахьи
- Selo
- Location within Republic of Dagestan Location within Russia
- Coordinates: 42°17′N 47°21′E
- Country: Russia
- Region: Republic of Dagestan
- District: Akushinsky District
- Time zone: UTC+3:00

Semgamakhi (Russian: Семгамахи; Dargwa: Семгамахьи) is a rural locality (a selo) in Akushinsky Selsoviet, Akushinsky District, Republic of Dagestan, Russia. The population was 668 as of 2010. There are 21 streets.

== Geography ==
Semgamakhi is located 2 km northeast of Akusha (the district's administrative centre) by road. Akusha is the nearest rural locality.
