= Kakamakhi =

Kakamakhi Какамахи Къакъамахи
- Selo
- Location within Republic of Dagestan Location within Russia
- Coordinates: 42°37′N 47°26′E
- Country: Russia
- Region: Republic of Dagestan
- District: Karabudakhkentsky District
- Time zone: UTC+3:00

Kakamakhi (Russian: Какамахи; Kumyk: Къакъамахи, Qaqamaxi) is a rural locality (a selo) in Kaka-Shurinsky Selsoviet, Karabudakhkentsky District, Republic of Dagestan, Russia. The population was 1,269 as of 2010. There are 27 streets.

== Nationalities ==
Kumyks live there.

== Geography ==
Kakamakhi is located 20 km northwest of Karabudakhkent (the district's administrative centre) by road. Kaka-Shura is the nearest rural locality.
