= Ameterkmakhi =

Ameterkmakhi Аметеркмахи Аметеркмахьи
- Selo
- Location within Republic of Dagestan Location within Russia
- Coordinates: 42°19′N 47°12′E
- Country: Russia
- Region: Republic of Dagestan
- District: Akushinsky District
- Time zone: UTC+3:00

Ameterkmakhi (Russian: Аметеркмахи; Dargwa: Аметеркмахьи) is a rural locality (a selo) in Akushinsky District, Republic of Dagestan, Russia. The population was 2,140 as of 2010. There are 7 streets.

== Geography ==
Ameterkmakhi is located on the Akusha River, 16 km northwest of Akusha (the district's administrative centre) by road. Kurkabi is the nearest rural locality.
