= Akhsakadamakhi =

Akhsakadamakhi Ахсакадамахи Ахсакъадамахьи
- Selo
- Location within Republic of Dagestan Location within Russia
- Coordinates: 42°16′N 47°13′E
- Country: Russia
- Region: Republic of Dagestan
- District: Akushinsky District
- Time zone: UTC+3:00

Akhsakadamakhi (Russian: Ахсакадамахи; Dargwa: Ахсакъадамахьи) is a rural locality (a selo) in Burgimakmakhinsky Selsoviet, Akushinsky District, Republic of Dagestan, Russia. The population was 205 as of 2010. There are 2 streets.

== Geography ==
Akhsakadamakhi is located 10 km southeast of Akusha (the district's administrative centre) by road. Geba is the nearest rural locality.
