= Dubrimakhi =

Dubrimakhi Дубримахи Дубримахьи
- Selo
- Location within Republic of Dagestan Location within Russia
- Coordinates: 42°15′N 47°17′E
- Country: Russia
- Region: Republic of Dagestan
- District: Akushinsky District
- Time zone: UTC+3:00

Dubrimakhi (Russian: Дубримахи; Dargwa: Дубримахьи) is a rural locality (a selo) and the administrative centre of Dubrimakhinsky Selsoviet, Akushinsky District, Republic of Dagestan, Russia. The population was 690 as of 2010.

== Geography ==
Dubrimakhi is located 8 km west of Akusha (the district's administrative centre) by road. Burgimakhi is the nearest rural locality.
