= Khazhnimakhi =

Khazhnimakhi Хажнимахи ХIяжнимахьи
- Selo
- Location within Republic of Dagestan Location within Russia
- Coordinates: 42°15′N 47°18′E
- Country: Russia
- Region: Republic of Dagestan
- District: Akushinsky District
- Time zone: UTC+3:00

Khazhnimakhi (Russian: Хажнимахи; Dargwa: ХIяжнимахьи) is a rural locality (a selo) in Dubrimakhinsky Selsoviet, Akushinsky District, Republic of Dagestan, Russia. The population was 143 as of 2010.

== Geography ==
Khazhnimakhi is located 4 km southeast of Akusha (the district's administrative centre) by road, on the Gandara River. Khazhnimakhi is the nearest rural locality.
