= Zilmukmakhi =

Zilmukmakhi Зильмукмахи Зильмукьмахьи
- Selo
- Location within Republic of Dagestan Location within Russia
- Coordinates: 42°17′N 47°23′E
- Country: Russia
- Region: Republic of Dagestan
- District: Akushinsky District
- Time zone: UTC+3:00

Zilmukmakhi (Russian: Зильмукмахи; Dargwa: Зильмукьмахьи) is a rural locality (a selo) in Usishinsky Selsoviet, Akushinsky District, Republic of Dagestan, Russia. The population was 325 as of 2010.

== Geography ==
Zilmukmakhi is located 11 km east of Akusha (the district's administrative centre) by road, on the Shinkvalikotta River. Kakmakhi is the nearest rural locality.
