= Yaraymakhi =

Yaraymakhi Яраймахи Яраймахьи
- Selo
- Location within Republic of Dagestan Location within Russia
- Coordinates: 42°17′N 47°21′E
- Country: Russia
- Region: Republic of Dagestan
- District: Akushinsky District
- Time zone: UTC+3:00

Yaraymakhi (Russian: Яраймахи; Dargwa: Яраймахьи) is a rural locality (a selo) in Burgimakmakhinsky Selsoviet, Akushinsky District, Republic of Dagestan, Russia. The population was 149 as of 2010.

== Geography ==
Yaraymakhi is located 6 km northeast of Akusha (the district's administrative centre) by road. Burgimakmakhi is the nearest rural locality.
