= Balkhar =

Balkhar Балхар Балхъар
- Selo
- Location within Republic of Dagestan Location within Russia
- Coordinates: 42°16′N 47°13′E
- Country: Russia
- Region: Republic of Dagestan
- District: Akushinsky District
- Time zone: UTC+3:00

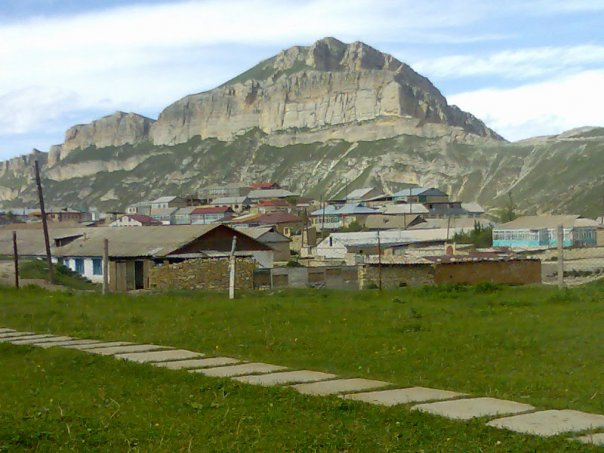
The village in 2008

Balkhar (Russian: Балхар; Lak: Балхъар) is a rural locality (a selo) and the administrative centre of Balkharsky Selsoviet, Akushinsky District, Republic of Dagestan, Russia. The population was 939 as of 2010.

== Geography ==
Balkhar is located at the altitude of 1,672 metres above the sea. It is located 21 km west of Akusha (the district's administrative centre) by road, and is situated nearby to the village Kuli and the locality Tsulikana.
