= Nizhny Chiamakhi =

Nizhny Chiamakhi Нижний Чиамахи УбяхI ЧIигIямахьи
- Selo
- Location within Republic of Dagestan Location within Russia
- Coordinates: 42°02′N 47°23′E
- Country: Russia
- Region: Republic of Dagestan
- District: Akushinsky District
- Time zone: UTC+3:00

Nizhny Chiamakhi (Russian: Нижний Чиамахи; Dargwa: УбяхI ЧIигIямахьи) is a rural locality (a selo) in Kassagumakhinsky Selsoviet, Akushinsky District, Republic of Dagestan, Russia. The population was 30 as of 2010.

== Geography ==
Nizhny Chiamakhi is located 41 km south of Akusha (the district's administrative centre) by road, on the Karakotta River. Verkhny Chiamakhi is the nearest rural locality.
