= Geli, Republic of Dagestan =

Geli Гели Гелли
- Selo
- Location within Republic of Dagestan Location within Russia
- Coordinates: 42°43′N 47°24′E
- Country: Russia
- Region: Republic of Dagestan
- District: Karabudakhkentsky District
- Time zone: UTC+3:00

Geli (Russian: Гели; Kumyk: Гелли, Gelli) is a rural locality (a selo) in Karabudakhkentsky District, Republic of Dagestan, Russia. The population was 2,798 as of 2010. There are 46 streets.

== Geography ==
Geli is located 16 km northwest of Karabudakhkent (the district's administrative centre) by road. Paraul and Adanak are the nearest rural localities.

== Demographics ==
There are Kumyk residents in Geli.
