= Geli =

Geli may refer to:

- Geli Raubal (1908–1931), a niece of Adolf Hitler
- Ángel de Juana García, a.k.a. Geli (born 1968), a Spanish football player
- Geli, Iran
- Geli, Republic of Dagestan, Russia
- geli (software), a disk encryption system written for FreeBSD
