= Abdulkhakim =

Abdulkhakim is a masculine given name.

== List of people with the given name ==
- Abdulkhakim Gadzhiyev (born 1966), Russian politician
- Abdulkhakim Ismailov (1916–2010), Russian soldier
- Abdulkhakim Shapiyev (born 1983), Russian and Kazakhstani wrestler

== See also ==
- Abdul
