= Manaskent =

Manaskent Манаскент Манасгент
- Selo
- Location within Republic of Dagestan Location within Russia
- Coordinates: 42°44′N 47°41′E
- Country: Russia
- Region: Republic of Dagestan
- District: Karabudakhkentsky District
- Time zone: UTC+3:00

Manaskent (Russian: Манаскент; Kumyk: Манасгент, Manasgent) is a rural locality (a selo) in Karabudakhkentsky District, Republic of Dagestan, Russia. The population was 4,994 as of 2010. There are 90 streets.

== Geography ==
Manaskent is located 14 km northeast of Karabudakhkent (the district's administrative centre) by road. Zelenomorsk is the nearest rural locality.

== Nationalities ==
Kumyks, Dargins and Laks live there.
