= Nizhniye Karshli =

Nizhniye Karshli Нижний Каршли УбяхI Хъаршли
- Selo
- Location within Republic of Dagestan Location within Russia
- Coordinates: 42°02′N 47°20′E
- Country: Russia
- Region: Republic of Dagestan
- District: Akushinsky District
- Time zone: UTC+3:00

Nizhniye Karshli (Russian: Нижний Каршли; Dargwa: УбяхI Хъаршли) is a rural locality (a selo) in Kassagumakhinsky Selsoviet, Akushinsky District, Republic of Dagestan, Russia. The population was 81 as of 2010.

== Geography ==
It is located 29 km south of Akusha, on the Khunikotta River.
