= Taygib Tolboyev =

Russian test pilot (1955–2021)

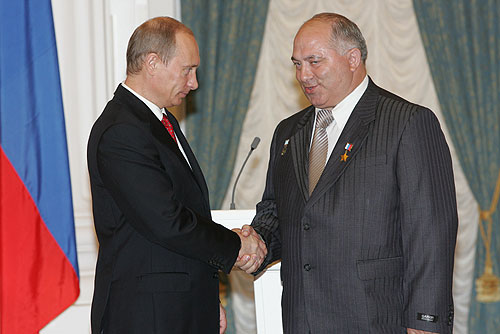
- Russian president Vladimir Putin (left) and Tolboyev (May 2007)
- Born: 8 August 1955; Sogratl, Russian SFSR, Soviet Union
- Died: 20 May 2021 (aged 65); Sogratl, Russia
- Occupation: test pilot

Taygib Omarovich Tolboyev (Russian: Тайги́б Ома́рович Толбо́ев; 8 August 1955 – 20 May 2021) was a Soviet and Russian test pilot.

Tolboyev was born on 8 August 1955 in the village of Sogratl, Gunibsky District, then part of the Dagestan Autonomous Soviet Socialist Republic, in the Russian SFSR, Soviet Union. He was the younger brother of Magomed Tolboyev, who also became a test pilot, and a Hero of the Russian Federation. Tolboyev joined the Soviet Armed Forces in 1974, serving in the Soviet Air Force. On 9 May 2007 he was awarded the title of Hero of the Russian Federation for courage and heroism shown during the testing of new models of aviation technology. He had received the title of Honoured Test Pilot of the Russian Federation on 10 October 2002, the Order of Military Merit on 10 September 2006, and the title of Hero of Dagestan in 2006. In retirement he served as a deputy of the People's Khural of the Republic of Buryatia, for United Russia, between 2007 and 2013.

Tolboyev died in Sogratl on 20 May 2021, aged 65.

== See also ==
- List of Heroes of the Russian Federation
