= Achi-Su =

Achi-Su Ачи-Су
- Urban-type settlement

Other transcription(s)
  - Dargwa: Ачису
- Interactive map of Achi-Su
- Location of Achi-Su Achi-Su (Republic of Dagestan)
- Coordinates: 42°39′N 47°41′E
- Country: Russia
- Federal subject: Dagestan
- Administrative district: Karabudakhkentsky District
- SettlementSelsoviet: Achi-Su Settlement
- Elevation: 183 m (600 ft)

Population (2010 Census)
  - Total: 1,679
  - Estimate (2025): 1,970 (+17.3%)

Administrative status
  - Capital of: Achi-Su Settlement

Municipal status
  - Municipal district: Karabudakhkentsky Municipal District
  - Urban settlement: Achi-Su Urban Settlement
  - Capital of: Achi-Su Urban Settlement
- Time zone: UTC+3 (MSK)
- Postal code: 368538
- OKTMO ID: 82635153051

Achi-Su population
- 2010 Census: 1,679
- 2002 Census: 1,622
- 1989 Census: 1,161
- 1979 Census: 1,037

Achi-Su (Russian: Ачи-Су), also known as Achisu (Ачису), is an urban locality (an urban-type settlement) in Karabudakhkentsky District of the Republic of Dagestan, Russia. As of the 2010 Census, its population was 1,679.

== Administrative and municipal status ==
Within the framework of administrative divisions, the urban-type settlement of Achi-Su is incorporated within Karabudakhkentsky District as Achi-Su Settlement (an administrative division of the district). As a municipal division, Achi-Su Settlement is incorporated within Karabudakhkentsky Municipal District as Achi-Su Urban Settlement.
