= Khizri Abakarov =

Russian politician

- Хизри Абакаров
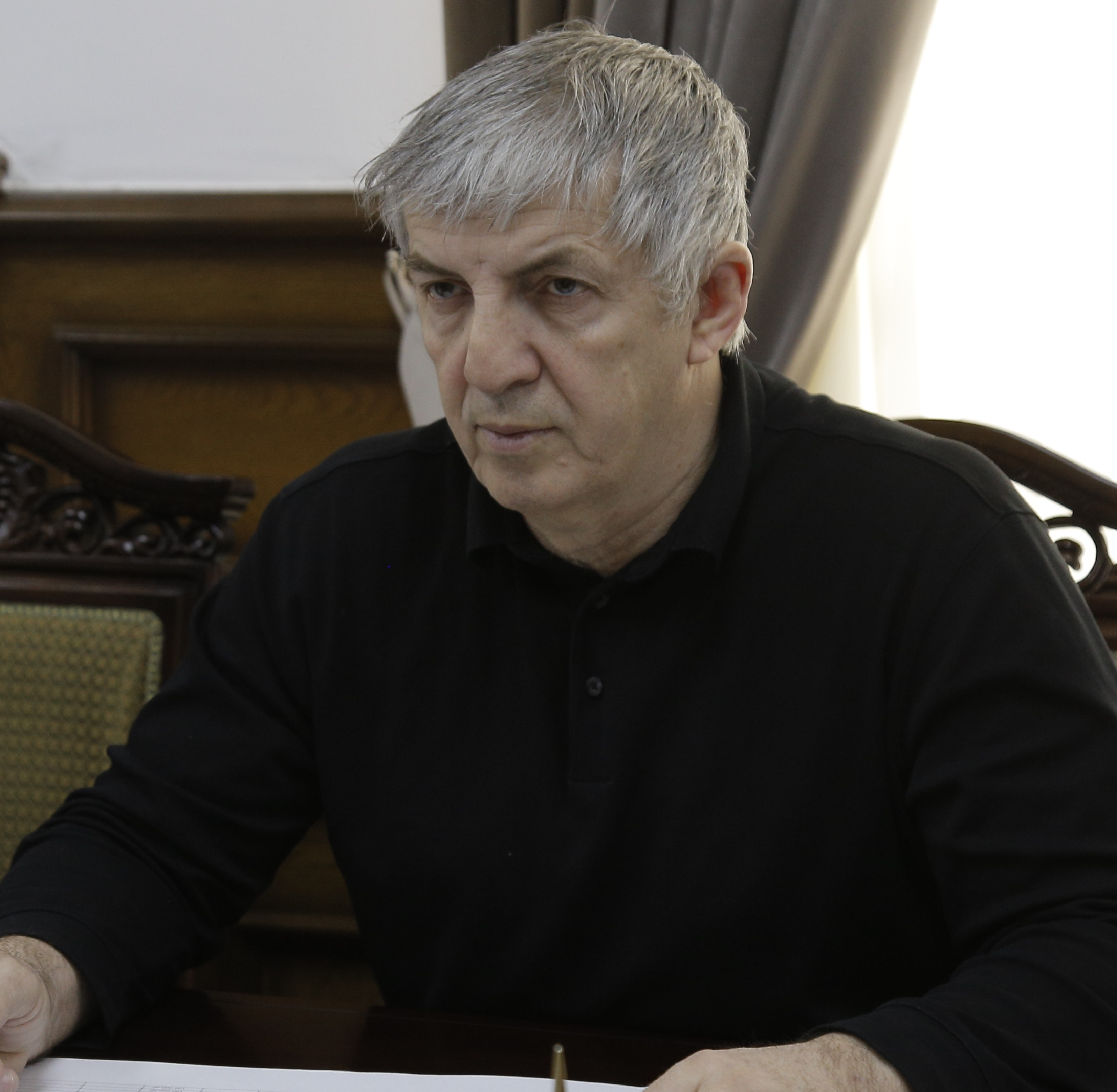
- Abakarov in 2020

Member of the 8th State Duma
- Incumbent
- Assumed office 19 September 2021

State Secretary of Dagestan
- In office 10 November 2020 – 23 September 2021

Head of Derbent Town District
- In office 16 October 2018 – 10 November 2020

Personal details
- Born: Khizri Abakarov Magomedovich; 28 June 1960 (age 66) Yuzhno-Sukhokumsk, Dagestan Autonomous Soviet Socialist Republic, Russian Soviet Federative Socialist Republic, Soviet Union
- Party: United Russia
- Education: Dagestan State Technical University

Khizri Magomedovich Abakarov (Russian: Хизри Магомедович Абакаров; born 28 June 1960) is a Russian statesman, public figure, and entrepreneur. Since 19 September 2021, he has been a Deputy of the State Duma of the 8th convocation, representing the United Russia ruling party.

From 2011 to 2013, he supervised the construction of Anzhi Arena (Kaspiysk, Dagestan).

He served as head of the administration of the city of Derbent, Dagestan (from 16 October 2018 to 10 November 2020). From 10 November 2020 to 23 September 2021, he held the position of State Secretary of the Republic of Dagestan.

== Biography ==
=== Early life ===
Khizri Abakarov was born on 28 June 1960 in the town of Yuzhno-Sukhokumsk, but his family originates from the village of Salta in the Gunibsky District of Dagestan. He is of Avar ethnicity. In 1969, he began his studies at Boarding School No. 1 in Derbent. In 1978, he graduated from Boarding School No. 4 in Makhachkala. From 1978 to 1983, he studied at the Dagestan Polytechnic Institute (now Dagestan State Technical University), where he received a degree in mechanical engineering.

After graduation, he was assigned to the Borisoglebsk Instrument-Making Plant, where he worked as a design engineer. From 1983 to 1985, he served in the Soviet Army. After military service, until 1987, he worked as a foreign-equipment fitter, chief mechanic at a machine and tractor station (MTS), and coach-instructor in Novy Urengoy.

From 1987 to 1993, Abakarov served as President of the Novy Urengoy Federation of Martial Arts. After that, he engaged in entrepreneurial activities.

== Sanctions ==
He was sanctioned by the United Kingdom government in 2022 in relation to the Russo-Ukrainian war.

On 24 March 2022, the United States Treasury sanctioned him in response to the 2022 Russian invasion of Ukraine. Abakarov has also been under New Zealand sanctions since May 3, 2022. Moreover, in September 2022, he was included in the list of Ukrainian sanctions.

== Awards ==
- Order of Friendship (18 May 2021) — for labor achievements and many years of dedicated service
- Order For Services to the Republic of Dagestan.
- Order of Alexander Nevsky (2023) — for active legislative work and many years of conscientious service
