= Manas (urban-type settlement) =

Manas Манас
- Urban-type settlement
- Interactive map of Manas
- Location of Manas Manas (Republic of Dagestan)
- Coordinates: 42°44′N 47°41′E
- Country: Russia
- Federal subject: Dagestan
- Administrative district: Karabudakhkentsky District
- SettlementSelsoviet: Manas Settlement
- Founded: June 9, 2005

Population (2010 Census)
  - Total: 5,357
  - Estimate (1939): 97 (−98.2%)

Administrative status
  - Capital of: Manas Settlement

Municipal status
  - Municipal district: Karabudakhkentsky Municipal District
  - Urban settlement: Manas Urban Settlement
  - Capital of: Manas Urban Settlement
- Time zone: UTC+3 (MSK)
- Postal code: 368545
- OKTMO ID: 82635155051

Manas (Russian: Мана́с) is an urban locality (an urban-type settlement) in Karabudakhkentsky District of the Republic of Dagestan, Russia. As of the 2010 Census, its population was 5,357.

== History ==
It was established on June 9, 2005 by splitting it from the urban-type settlement of Manaskent (which was subsequently transformed into a rural locality).

== Administrative and municipal status ==
Within the framework of administrative divisions, the urban-type settlement of Manas is incorporated within Karabudakhkentsky District as Manas Settlement (an administrative division of the district). As a municipal division, Manas Settlement is incorporated within Karabudakhkentsky Municipal District as Manas Urban Settlement.
