= Murad Gadzhiev =

Russian politician (born 1961)

- Мурад Гаджиев
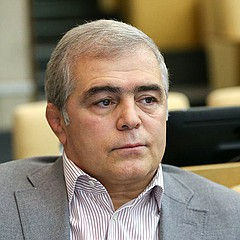

Member of the State Duma for Dagestan
- Incumbent
- Assumed office 12 October 2021
- Preceded by: Abdulgamid Emirgamzayev
- Constituency: Central Dagestan (No. 11)

Member of the State Duma (Party List Seat)
- In office 21 December 2011 – 12 October 2021

Personal details
- Born: 31 July 1961 (age 65) Makhachkala, Dagestan ASSR, RSFSR, USSR
- Party: United Russia
- Education: Dagestan State Technical University

Murad Stanislavovich Gadzhiev (Russian: Мурад Станиславович Гаджиев; born 31 July 1961) is a Russian political figure and a deputy of the 6th, 7th and 8th State Dumas.

== Early life and family ==
Murad Gadzhiev grew up in a sports-oriented family. His father, Stanislav Gadzhiev, was a Soviet sambist and freestyle wrestler. His brothers, Rustam Gadzhiev, was the winner of the Youth World Cup in freestyle wrestling, and Magomedsalam Gadzhiev, is an International Master of Sports of Russia in freestyle wrestling.

Murad himself also practiced freestyle wrestling, becoming a junior champion of the USSR and a medalist at the Junior European Championships.

== Education ==
In 1988, Gadzhiev graduated from the Dagestan Polytechnic Institute with a degree in Food Preservation Technology.

In 2000, he completed postgraduate studies at the Peoples’ Friendship University of Russia (RUDN), defending his thesis “Viticulture in the system of adaptive-landscape farming in Southern Dagestan”. He was awarded the degree of Candidate of Agricultural Sciences.

In 2005, at the Timiryazev Moscow Agricultural Academy, he defended his doctoral dissertation “Agroecological foundations for the sustainable development of viticulture, horticulture, and winemaking in Southern Dagestan in the 21st century”. He holds the title of Doctor of Agricultural Sciences.

== Career ==
From 1993 to 2008, Gadzhiev was director of the Derbent Cognac Plant.

From 1994 to 2011, he served as chairman of the Derbent City Assembly of Deputies.

In March 2011, he was elected deputy of the People’s Assembly of Dagestan.

=== State Duma ===
In December 2011, Gadzhiev ran for the State Duma and was elected deputy of the 6th convocation of the Federal Assembly of the Russian Federation.

In September 2018, he was again elected as deputy of the State Duma of the 7th convocation.

In September 2021, during the elections to the 8th State Duma, he was elected from the Central single-mandate constituency No. 11 in the Republic of Dagestan as a representative of United Russia. He received 80.20% of the votes cast in his constituency.

== Sanctions ==
He was sanctioned by the UK government in 2022 in relation to the Russo-Ukrainian War.

== Awards ==
- Order of Friendship
- Order of Honour
