= Magomed Tolboyev =

Soviet test pilot

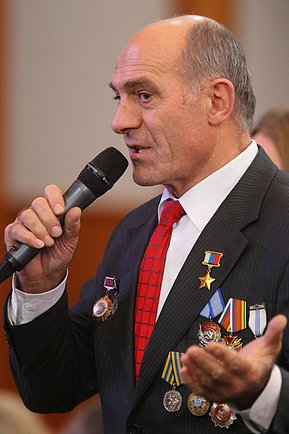
Tolboev in 2012

Magomed Omarovich Tolboyev (Russian: Магомед Омарович Толбоев; born 20 January 1951) is a former high-profile Soviet-era test pilot who initially came to public attention as a test pilot for the Buran space shuttle. He is from Dagestan. He continued his career after the collapse of the Soviet Union, working on both civilian and military aircraft in Russia, and held several governmental appointments including in the Aviation Ministry. He was decorated with the title Hero of Russia and other honors before retiring from active service. He continues to be a part-time consultant and commentator on aviation issues.

In 2004 Tolboyev was the focus of media attention due to an attack on him by police officers in Moscow. They brutally beat him because of his name that sounded like he was a Chechen, although he in fact was a member of Avar people.

Tolboyev's younger brother, Taygib, was also a test pilot, and a Hero of the Russian Federation.

== See also ==
- List of Heroes of the Russian Federation
- Racism in Russia
