= Rustam Gadzhiyev =

Russian footballer

Personal information
- Full name: Rustam Amirkhanovich Gadzhiyev
- Date of birth: 13 January 1978 (age 48)
- Place of birth: Makhachkala, Russian SFSR
- Height: 1.87 m (6 ft 1 1/2 in)
- Position: Defender

Senior career*
Years	Team	Apps	(Gls)
1996	FC Anzhi-2 Kaspiysk	28	(0)
1997	FC Anzhi-d Makhachkala	44	(1)
1998–2000	FC Dynamo Makhachkala	92	(9)
2002	FC Dynamo Makhachkala	6	(0)
2003	FC Zhemchuzhina Budyonnovsk	20	(0)
2004	FC Vityaz Krymsk	18	(1)
2004–2005	FC Dynamo Makhachkala	22	(0)
2006	FC Dynamo Barnaul	28	(1)
2007	FC Volochanin-Ratmir Vyshny Volochyok	21	(0)
2008	FC Khimik Dzerzhinsk	34	(0)
2009	FC Sibiryak Bratsk	9	(0)
2010	FC Mashuk-KMV Pyatigorsk	31	(0)
2011–2012	FC KUZBASS Kemerovo	34	(0)
2012–2013	FC Baikal Irkutsk	11	(1)
- * Club domestic league appearances and goals

Rustam Amirkhanovich Gadzhiyev (Russian: Рустам Амирханович Гаджиев; born 13 January 1978) is a retired Russian professional football player.

== Club career ==
He made his Russian Football National League debut for FC Dynamo Makhachkala on 4 September 2004 in a game against FC Sokol Saratov. He played one more season in the FNL for Dynamo.
