= Yuzhno-Sukhokumsk =

Town in the Republic of Dagestan, Russia

Yuzhno-Sukhokumsk Южно-Сухокумск
- Town
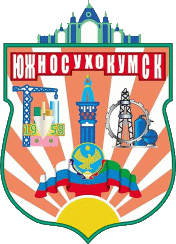
- Coat of arms
- Interactive map of Yuzhno-Sukhokumsk
- Location of Yuzhno-Sukhokumsk Yuzhno-Sukhokumsk (Republic of Dagestan)
- Coordinates: 44°40′N 45°39′E
- Country: Russia
- Federal subject: Dagestan
- Town status since: 1988
- Elevation: 10 m (33 ft)

Population (2010 Census)
  - Total: 10,035
  - Estimate (2021): 10,503 (+4.7%)

Administrative status
  - Subordinated to: Town of Yuzhno-Sukhokumsk
  - Capital of: Town of Yuzhno-Sukhokumsk

Municipal status
  - Urban okrug: Yuzhno-Sukhokumsk Urban Okrug
  - Capital of: Yuzhno-Sukhokumsk Urban Okrug
- Time zone: UTC+3 (MSK)
- Postal code: 368890
- OKTMO ID: 82738000001
- Website: dagmo.ru/gorod-yuzhno-suhokumsk

Yuzhno-Sukhokumsk (Russian: Ю́жно-Сухоку́мск, Avar: Салануб; Lezgian: Кьибле-Сухокумск) is a town in the Republic of Dagestan, Russia, located on the Sukhaya Kuma River, 295 kilometers (183 mi) northwest of Makhachkala. Population: 10,035 (2010 census); 9,777 (2002 census); 12,246 (1989 Soviet census).

== History ==
It was granted urban-type settlement status in 1963 and town status in 1988.

== Administrative and municipal status ==
Within the framework of administrative divisions, it is incorporated as the Town of Yuzhno-Sukhokumsk—an administrative unit with the status equal to that of the districts. As a municipal division, the Town of Yuzhno-Sukhokumsk is incorporated as Yuzhno-Sukhokumsk Urban Okrug.

== Demographics ==
Ethnic groups (2002 census):

- Avars (47.9%)
- Dargins (18.5%)
- Lezgins (10.7%)
- Laks (9.0%)
- Russians (5.4%)
- Kumyks (3.8%)

== Climate ==
Yuzhno-Sukhokumsk has a cold semi-arid climate (Köppen climate classification: BSk).

Climate data for Yuzhno-Sukhokumsk
Month	Jan	Feb	Mar	Apr	May	Jun	Jul	Aug	Sep	Oct	Nov	Dec	Year
Mean daily maximum °C (°F)	−0.3 (31.5)	0.9 (33.6)	6.8 (44.2)	16.9 (62.4)	23.8 (74.8)	28.3 (82.9)	30.8 (87.4)	29.9 (85.8)	23.9 (75.0)	15.8 (60.4)	7.9 (46.2)	2.5 (36.5)	15.6 (60.1)
Daily mean °C (°F)	−3.7 (25.3)	−2.9 (26.8)	2.6 (36.7)	11.0 (51.8)	17.8 (64.0)	22.3 (72.1)	24.9 (76.8)	23.8 (74.8)	18.1 (64.6)	10.8 (51.4)	4.3 (39.7)	−0.5 (31.1)	10.7 (51.3)
Mean daily minimum °C (°F)	−7.0 (19.4)	−6.6 (20.1)	−1.6 (29.1)	5.2 (41.4)	11.8 (53.2)	16.3 (61.3)	19.0 (66.2)	17.7 (63.9)	12.3 (54.1)	5.8 (42.4)	0.8 (33.4)	−3.4 (25.9)	5.9 (42.5)
Average precipitation mm (inches)	17 (0.7)	16 (0.6)	19 (0.7)	24 (0.9)	38 (1.5)	46 (1.8)	37 (1.5)	33 (1.3)	27 (1.1)	21 (0.8)	22 (0.9)	21 (0.8)	321 (12.6)
Source: Climate-Data.org
