= Abdulkhakim Gadzhiyev =

Russian politician (born 1966)

- Абдулхаким Гаджиев
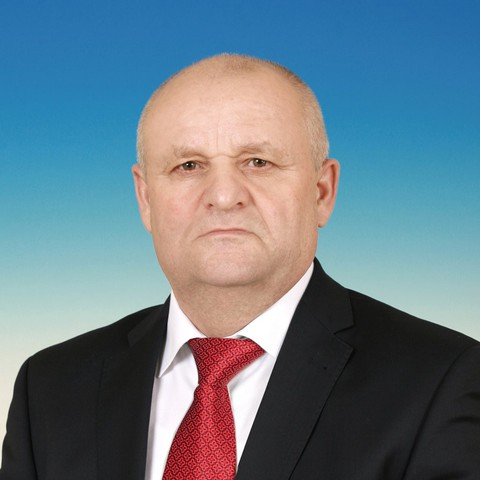
- official portrait, circa 2021

Member of the State Duma for Dagestan
- In office 12 October 2021 – 30 September 2026
- Preceded by: Umakhan Umakhanov
- Succeeded by: Magomed Valikhov
- Constituency: Northern Dagestan (No. 10)

Personal details
- Born: 13 February 1966 (age 60) Zubutli, Dagestan ASSR, RSFSR, USSR
- Party: United Russia
- Occupation: Officer; Politician

Military service
- Allegiance: USSR; Russian Federation
- Branch/service: Ministry of Internal Affairs (Soviet Union); Ministry of Internal Affairs (Russia); National Guard
- Years of service: 1988-2021
- Rank: Major General
- Battles/wars: War in Dagestan

Major General Abdulkhakim Kutbudinovich Gadzhiyev (Russian: Абдулхаким Кутбудинович Гаджиев; born 13 February 1966) is a Russian politician from Dagestan. He was elected to the State Duma in the Northern Dagestan constituency in the 2021 election.

Abdulkhakim Gadzhiyev was born in 1966 in Zubutli, Kazbekovsky District, Dagestan Autonomous Soviet Socialist Republic. In 1992 he graduated from the Nizhny Novgorod Higher School of the Ministry of Internal Affairs. In 2005–2010 he was deputy head of the Organized Crime Control Department of Dagestan interior ministry. In 2016–2021 Gadzhiyev was deputy commander of the North Caucasian District of the National Guard of Russia. In 2021, he was elected to the 8th State Duma from the Northern Dagestan constituency. He is a member of the committee on security and anti-corruption.

== Awards ==
- Medal “For Displayed Courage” (12 September 2024) — for contributions to strengthening state security, courage, bravery, and selflessness shown in defending the territory of the Republic of Dagestan from international armed groups in 1999.

== Sanctions ==
He was sanctioned by the UK government in 2022 in relation to the Russo-Ukrainian War.
