= Karabudakhkent =

Rural locality in Dagestan, Russia

Coordinates: 42°42′32″N 47°33′46″E

Karabudakhkent (Russian: Карабудахкент, Kumyk: Къарабудагъгент, Qarabudağgent) is a rural locality (a selo) and the administrative center of Karabudakhkentsky District of the Republic of Dagestan, Russia. Population: 15,356 (2010 census); 12,336 (2002 census); 8,933 (1989 Soviet census).
