= Karabudakhkentsky District =

Karabudakhkentsky District Карабудахкентский район (Russian)
- District

Other transcription(s)
  - Kumyk: Къарабудагъгентли якъ
  - Dargwa: Къарабудагъкентла район
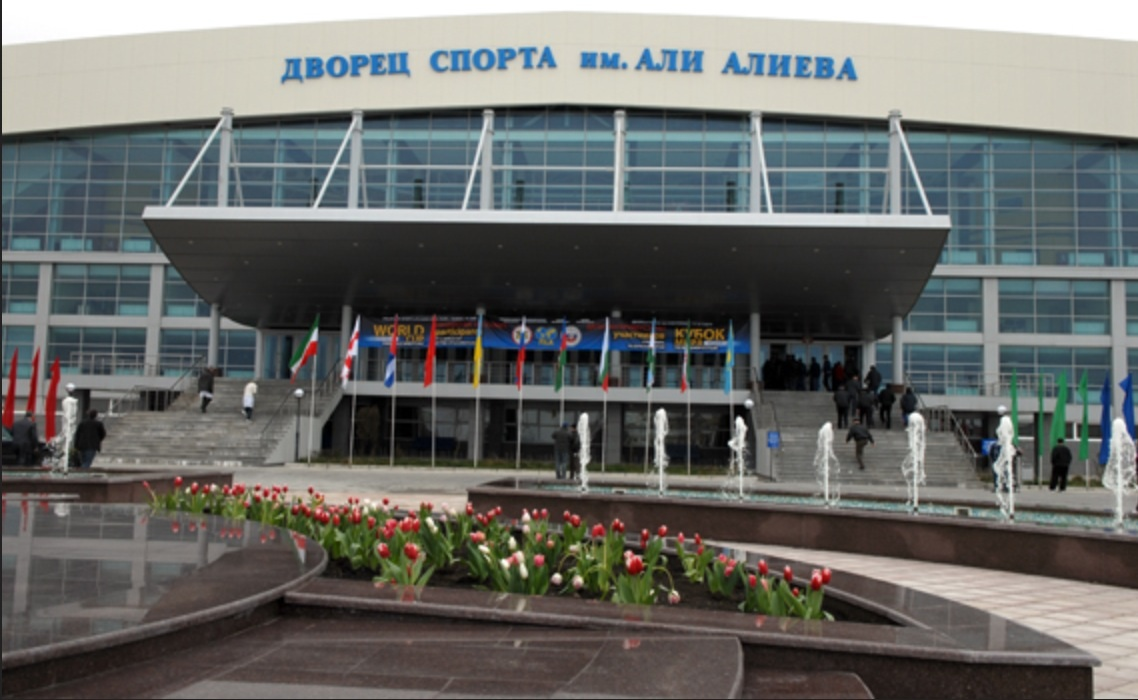
- Sports complex, Karabudakhkentsky District

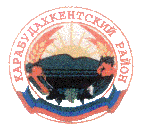
- Coat of arms
- Location of Karabudakhkentsky District in the Republic of Dagestan
- Coordinates: 42°42′N 47°33′E
- Country: Russia
- Federal subject: Republic of Dagestan
- Established: January 20, 1921
- Administrative center: Karabudakhkent

Area
  - Total: 1,460 km^{2} (560 sq mi)

Population (2010 Census)
  - Total: 73,016
  - Density: 50.0/km^{2} (130/sq mi)
  - Urban: 9.6%
  - Rural: 90.4%

Administrative structure
  - Administrative divisions: 2 Settlements, 3 Selsoviets
  - Inhabited localities: 2 urban-type settlements, 16 rural localities

Municipal structure
  - Municipally incorporated as: Karabudakhkentsky Municipal District
  - Municipal divisions: 2 urban settlements, 12 rural settlements
- Time zone: UTC+3 (MSK)
- OKTMO ID: 82635000
- Website: http://www.bekenez.ru

Population of Karabudakhkentsky District
- 2010 Census: 73,016
- 2002 Census: 60,620
- 1989 Census: 39,486
- 1979 Census: 35,705

Karabudakhkentsky District (Russian: Карабудахкентский райо́н, Kumyk: Къарабудагъгентли якъ, Qarabudağgentli yaq) is an administrative and municipal district (raion), one of the forty-one in the Republic of Dagestan, Russia. It is located in the east of the republic. The area of the district is 1,460 square kilometers (560 sq mi). Its administrative center is the rural locality (a selo) of Karabudakhkent. As of the 2010 Census, the total population of the district was 73,016, with the population of Karabudakhkent accounting for 21.0% of that number.

== History ==
The district was established by the Central Executive Committee decree on January 20, 1921. It underwent numerous changes during the following years and was established in its present borders in 1965 as Leninsky District (Ле́нинский райо́н). In 1992, it was renamed Karabudakhkentsky District.

== Administrative and municipal status ==
Within the framework of administrative divisions, Karabudakhkentsky District is one of the forty-one in the Republic of Dagestan. It is divided into two settlements (administrative divisions with the administrative centers in the urban-type settlements (inhabited localities) of Achi-Su and Manas) and three selsoviets, which comprise sixteen rural localities. As a municipal division, the district is incorporated as Karabudakhkentsky Municipal District. The settlements are incorporated as urban settlements, and the three selsoviets are incorporated as twelve rural settlements within the municipal district. The selo of Karabudakhkent serves as the administrative center of both the administrative and municipal district.
