= Akusha =

Akusha Акуша
- Selo

Other transcription(s)
  - Dargin: Ахъуша
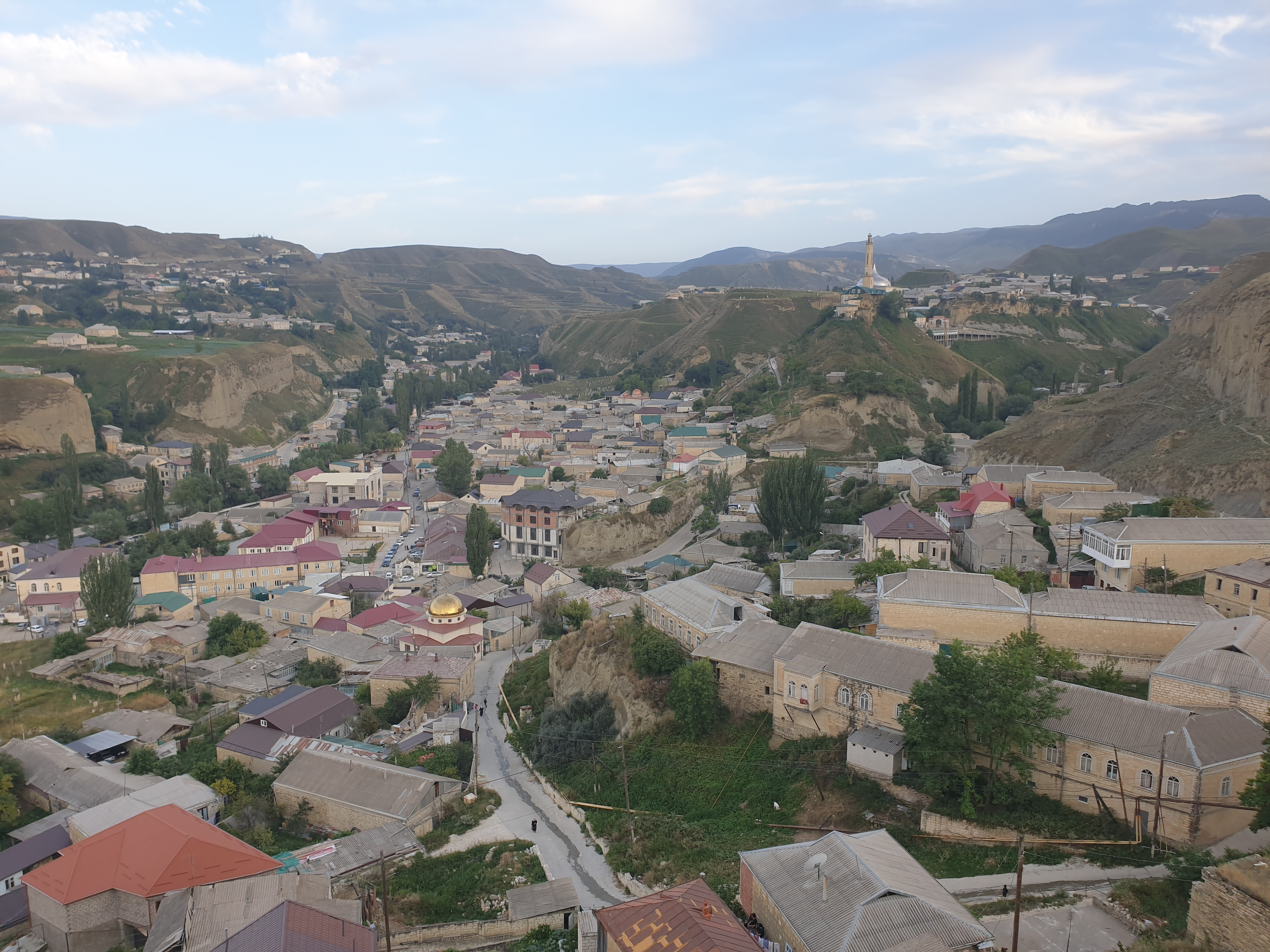
- Interactive map of Akusha
- Location of Akusha Akusha (Republic of Dagestan)
- Coordinates: 42°16′32″N 47°20′37″E
- Country: Russia
- Federal subject: Dagestan
- Administrative district: Akushinsky District
- SettlementSelsoviet: Akushinskoye Settlement
- Elevation: 1,394 m (4,573 ft)

Population (2010 Census)
  - Total: 4,697
  - Estimate (2021): 4,599 (−2.1%)

Administrative status
  - Capital of: Akushinsky District, Akushinskoye Settlement

Municipal status
  - Municipal district: Akushinsky Municipal District
  - Rural settlement: Selsoviet Akushinsky Rural Settlement
  - Capital of: Akushinsky Municipal District, Selsoviet Akushinsky Rural Settlement
- Time zone: UTC+3 (MSK)
- Postal code: 368280
- OKTMO ID: 82603404101

Akusha (Russian: Акуша, Dargin: Ахъуша) is a rural locality (a selo) and the administrative center of Akushinsky District of the Republic of Dagestan, Russia. Population: 4,697 (2010 census); 4,493 (2002 census); 3,675 (1989 Soviet census).
