= Akushinsky District =

Akushinsky District Акушинский район (Russian)
- District

Other transcription(s)
  - Dargwa: Ахъушала къатI
  - Lak: Ахьушала кIану
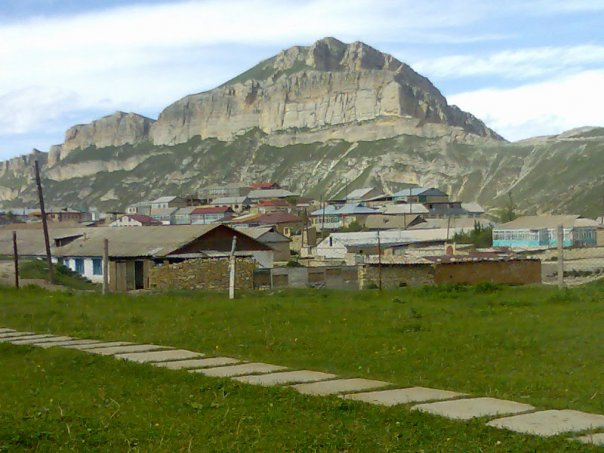
- The selo of Balkhar in Akushinsky District

- Coat of arms
- Location of Akushinsky District in the Republic of Dagestan
- Coordinates: 42°17′N 47°20′E
- Country: Russia
- Federal subject: Republic of Dagestan
- Established: 1 September 1934
- Administrative center: Akusha

Government
  - Body: ----STATISTICS----

Area
  - Total: 622.8 km^{2} (240.5 sq mi)

Population (2010 Census)
  - Total: 53,558
  - Density: 86.00/km^{2} (222.7/sq mi)
  - Urban: 0%
  - Rural: 100%

Administrative structure
  - Administrative divisions: 13 Selsoviets
  - Inhabited localities: 80 rural localities

Municipal structure
  - Municipally incorporated as: Akushinsky Municipal District
  - Municipal divisions: 0 urban settlements, 25 rural settlements
- Time zone: UTC+3 (MSK)
- OKTMO ID: 82603000
- Holiday: ----ADMINISTRATIVE STATUS----
- Website: http://akusha-mr.ru/

Population of Akushinsky District
- 2010 Census: 52,558
- 2002 Census: 52,455
- 1989 Census: 33,017
- 1979 Census: 33,888

Akushinsky District (Russian: Акушинский райо́н; Dargwa: Ахъушала къатI) is an administrative and municipal district (raion), one of the forty-one in the Republic of Dagestan, Russia. It is located in the southern central part of the republic. The area of the district is 622.8 square kilometers (240.5 sq mi). Its administrative center is the rural locality (a selo) of Akusha. As of the 2010 Census, the total population of the district was 52,558, with the population of Akusha accounting for 8.8% of that number.

== Administrative and municipal status ==
Within the framework of administrative divisions, Akushinsky District is one of the forty-one in the Republic of Dagestan. The district is divided into thirteen selsoviets which comprise eighty rural localities. As a municipal division, the district is incorporated as Akushinsky Municipal District. Its thirteen selsoviets are incorporated as twenty-five rural settlements within the municipal district. The selo of Akusha serves as the administrative center of both the administrative and municipal district.
