= Administrative divisions of Dagestan =

Republic of Dagestan Russia
- Administrative centre: Makhachkala

Administrative structure (as of 2014)
- Districts: 41
- Cities/towns: 10
- Urban-type settlements: 19
- Selsovets: 363

Municipal structure (as of 2002)
- Rural settlements: 1,605 (inhabited); 46 (uninhabited)

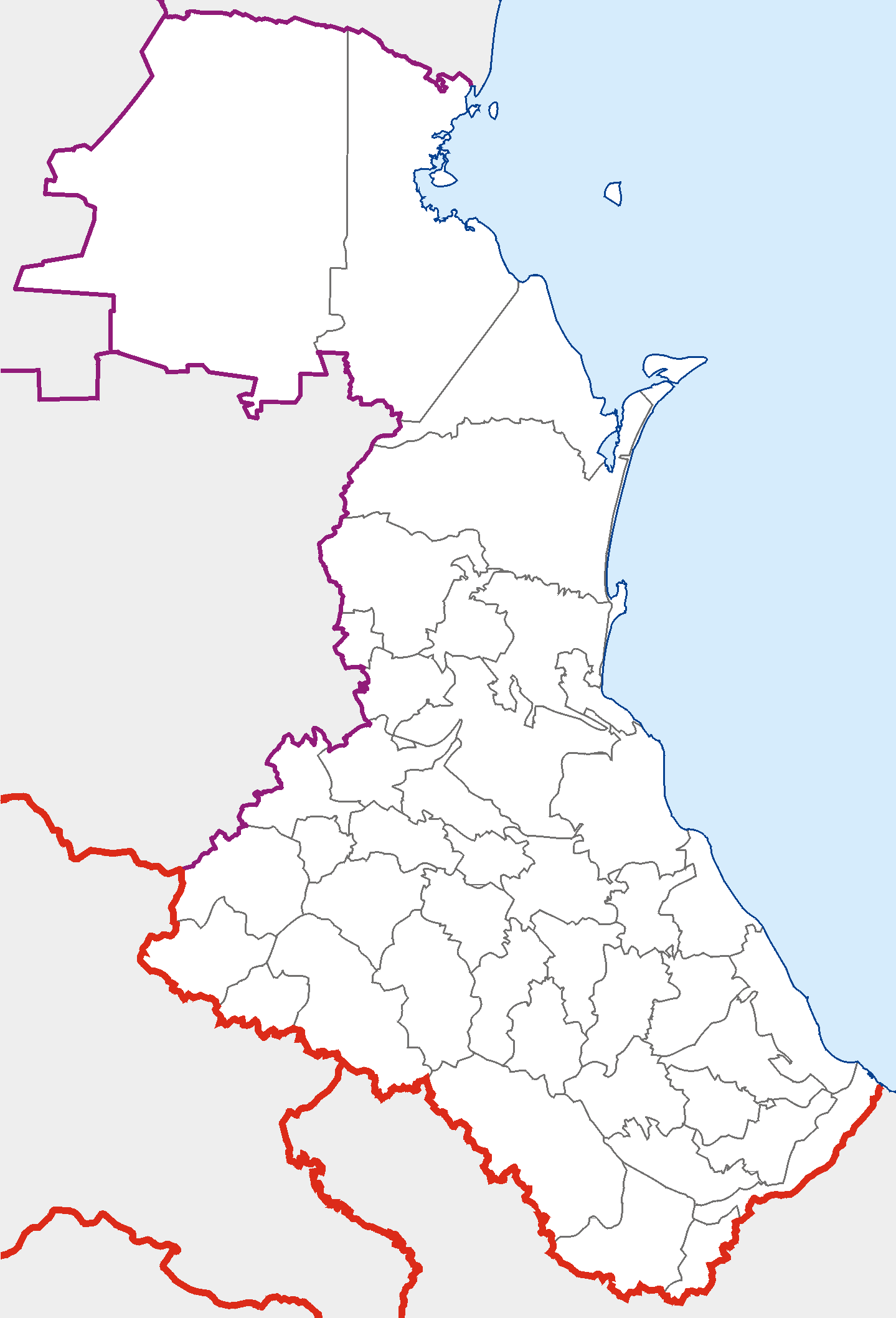
Location map of Dagestan.

Map of Dagestan and its capital, Makhachkala

Dagestan is a federal subject of Russia.

== Administrative and municipal divisions ==
- Cities and towns under republic's jurisdiction
  - Makhachkala (Махачкала) (capital)
    - city districts:
      - Kirovsky (Кировский)
        - Urban-type settlements under the city district's jurisdiction:
          - Leninkent (Ленинкент)
          - Semender (Семендер)
          - Sulak (Сулак)
          - Shamkhal (Шамхал)
      - Leninsky (Ленинский)
        - Urban-type settlements under the city district's jurisdiction:
          - Novy Kyakhulay (Новый Кяхулай)
      - Sovetsky (Советский)
        - Urban-type settlements under the city district's jurisdiction:
          - Alburikent (Альбурикент)
          - Kyakhulay (Кяхулай)
          - Tarki (Тарки)
  - Buynaksk (Буйнакск)
  - Dagestanskiye Ogni (Дагестанские Огни)
  - Derbent (Дербент)
  - Izberbash (Избербаш)
  - Kaspiysk (Каспийск)
  - Khasavyurt (Хасавюрт)
  - Kizilyurt (Кизилюрт)
    - Urban-type settlements under the town's jurisdiction:
      - Bavtugay (Бавтугай)
      - Novy Sulak (Новый Сулак)
  - Kizlyar (Кизляр)
    - Urban-type settlements under the town's jurisdiction:
      - Komsomolsky (Комсомольский)
  - Yuzhno-Sukhokumsk (Южно-Сухокумск)
- Districts:
  - Agulsky (Агульский)
    - with 6 selsovets under the district's jurisdiction.
  - Akhtynsky (Ахтынский)
    - with 4 selsovets under the district's jurisdiction.
  - Akhvakhsky (Ахвахский)
    - with 7 selsovets under the district's jurisdiction.
  - Akushinsky (Акушинский)
    - with 13 selsovets under the district's jurisdiction.
  - Babayurtovsky (Бабаюртовский)
    - with 7 selsovets under the district's jurisdiction.
  - Botlikhsky (Ботлихский)
    - with 9 selsovets under the district's jurisdiction.
  - Buynaksky (Буйнакский)
    - with 9 selsovets under the district's jurisdiction.
  - Charodinsky (Чародинский)
    - with 9 selsovets under the district's jurisdiction.
  - Dakhadayevsky (Дахадаевский)
    - Urban-type settlements under the district's jurisdiction:
      - Kubachi (Кубачи)
    - with 15 selsovets under the district's jurisdiction.
  - Derbentsky (Дербентский)
    - Urban-type settlements under the district's jurisdiction:
      - Belidzhi (Белиджи)
      - Mamedkala (Мамедкала)
    - with 7 selsovets under the district's jurisdiction.
  - Dokuzparinsky (Докузпаринский)
    - with 2 selsovets under the district's jurisdiction.
  - Gergebilsky (Гергебильский)
    - with 4 selsovets under the district's jurisdiction.
  - Gumbetovsky (Гумбетовский)
    - with 6 selsovets under the district's jurisdiction.
  - Gunibsky (Гунибский)
    - with 10 selsovets under the district's jurisdiction.
  - Karabudakhkentsky (Карабудахкентский)
    - Urban-type settlements under the district's jurisdiction:
      - Achi-Su (Ачи-Су)
      - Manas (Манас)
    - with 2 selsovets under the district's jurisdiction.
  - Kayakentsky (Каякентский)
    - with 5 selsovets under the district's jurisdiction.
  - Kaytagsky (Кайтагский)
    - with 12 selsovets under the district's jurisdiction.
  - Kazbekovsky (Казбековский)
    - Urban-type settlements under the district's jurisdiction:
      - Dubki (Дубки)
    - with 2 selsovets under the district's jurisdiction.
  - Khasavyurtovsky (Хасавюртовский)
    - with 13 selsovets under the district's jurisdiction.
  - Khivsky (Хивский)
    - with 11 selsovets under the district's jurisdiction.
  - Khunzakhsky (Хунзахский)
    - with 16 selsovets under the district's jurisdiction.
  - Kizilyurtovsky (Кизилюртовский)
    - with 3 selsovets under the district's jurisdiction.
  - Kizlyarsky (Кизлярский)
    - with 19 selsovets under the district's jurisdiction.
  - Kulinsky (Кулинский)
    - with 2 selsovets under the district's jurisdiction.
  - Kumtorkalinsky (Кумторкалинский)
    - Urban-type settlements under the district's jurisdiction:
      - Tyube (Тюбе)
    - with 1 selsovet under the district's jurisdiction.
  - Kurakhsky (Курахский)
    - with 10 selsovets under the district's jurisdiction.
  - Laksky (Лакский)
    - with 16 selsovets under the district's jurisdiction.
  - Levashinsky (Левашинский)
    - with 13 selsovets under the district's jurisdiction.
  - Magaramkentsky (Магарамкентский)
    - with 8 selsovets under the district's jurisdiction.
  - Nogaysky (Ногайский)
    - with 5 selsovets under the district's jurisdiction.
  - Novolaksky (Новолакский)
    - with 3 selsovets under the district's jurisdiction.
  - Rutulsky (Рутульский)
    - with 11 selsovets under the district's jurisdiction.
  - Sergokalinsky (Сергокалинский)
    - with 10 selsovets under the district's jurisdiction.
  - Shamilsky (Шамильский)
    - with 10 selsovets under the district's jurisdiction.
  - Suleyman-Stalsky (Сулейман-Стальский)
    - with 10 selsovets under the district's jurisdiction.
  - Tabasaransky (Табасаранский)
    - with 18 selsovets under the district's jurisdiction.
  - Tarumovsky (Тарумовский)
    - with 5 selsovets under the district's jurisdiction.
  - Tlyaratinsky (Тляратинский)
    - with 18 selsovets under the district's jurisdiction.
  - Tsumadinsky (Цумадинский)
    - with 15 selsovets under the district's jurisdiction.
  - Tsuntinsky (Цунтинский)
    - with 11 selsovets under the district's jurisdiction.
  - Untsukulsky (Унцукульский)
    - Urban-type settlements under the district's jurisdiction
      - Shamilkala (Шамилькала)
    - with 6 selsovets under the district's jurisdiction.
