= Sulak =

Sulak may refer to:

== Places ==
=== Iran ===
- Sulak, Khuzestan, a village in Khuzestan Province, Iran
- Sulak, Kohgiluyeh and Boyer-Ahmad, a village in Kohgiluyeh and Boyer-Ahmad Province, Iran
- Sūlak, an alternative name of Sulik, a village in West Azerbaijan Province, Iran

=== Russia ===
- Sulak, Russia, several inhabited localities in Russia
- Sulak (river), a river in the Republic of Dagestan, Russia
- Sulak Canyon, Dagestan, Russia

=== Turkey ===
- Sulak, Silvan, Turkey
- Sulak, Cizre, Turkey
- Sulak, Fındıklı, Turkey
- Sulak, İdil, Turkey
- Sulak, Artuklu, Turkey
- Sulak, Pazar, Turkey

=== Other places ===
- Sulak (crater), a crater on Mars

== People ==
- Stryker Sulak (born 1986), American football player
- Sulak Sivaraksa (born 1933), Thai Buddhist
- Lawrence Sulak, American physicist
- Libor Šulák (born 1990), Czech ice hockey player

== Other ==
- Šulak, a demon in Babylonian mythology
- Sulak, a Soviet-era fishing vessel that in 1969 released a message in a bottle found in Alaska in 2019

== See also ==
- Novy Sulak, urban-type settlement in the Republic of Dagestan, Russia
