= Nechayevka =

Nechayevka (Russian: Нечаевка) is the name of several rural localities in Russia.

== Altai Krai ==
As of 2010, one rural locality in Altai Krai bears this name:

- Nechayevka, Altai Krai, a settlement in Sverdlovsky Selsoviet of Khabarsky District

== Belgorod Oblast ==
As of 2010, three rural localities in Belgorod Oblast bear this name:

- Nechayevka, Belgorodsky District, Belgorod Oblast, a selo in Belgorodsky District
- Nechayevka, Novooskolsky District, Belgorod Oblast, a settlement in Novooskolsky District
- Nechayevka, Prokhorovsky District, Belgorod Oblast, a selo in Prokhorovsky District

== Republic of Dagestan ==
As of 2010, one rural locality in the Republic of Dagestan bears this name:

- Nechayevka, Republic of Dagestan, a selo in Nechayevsky Selsoviet of Kizilyurtovsky District

== Lipetsk Oblast ==
As of 2010, two rural localities in Lipetsk Oblast bear this name:

- Nechayevka, Khlevensky District, Lipetsk Oblast, a village in Sindyakinsky Selsoviet of Khlevensky District
- Nechayevka, Zadonsky District, Lipetsk Oblast, a village in Kasharsky Selsoviet of Zadonsky District

== Penza Oblast ==
As of 2010, two rural localities in Penza Oblast bear this name:

- Nechayevka, Mokshansky District, Penza Oblast, a selo in Nechayevsky Selsoviet of Mokshansky District
- Nechayevka, Nikolsky District, Penza Oblast, a selo in Ilminsky Selsoviet of Nikolsky District

== Ryazan Oblast ==
As of 2010, one rural locality in Ryazan Oblast bears this name:

- Nechayevka, Ryazan Oblast, a village in Osovsky Rural Okrug of Zakharovsky District

== Saratov Oblast ==
As of 2010, two rural localities in Saratov Oblast bear this name:

- Nechayevka, Bazarno-Karabulaksky District, Saratov Oblast, a village in Bazarno-Karabulaksky District
- Nechayevka, Voskresensky District, Saratov Oblast, a selo in Voskresensky District

== Voronezh Oblast ==
As of 2010, one rural locality in Voronezh Oblast bears this name:

- Nechayevka, Voronezh Oblast, a selo in Usmanskoye 2-ye Rural Settlement of Novousmansky District

== Yaroslavl Oblast ==
As of 2010, one rural locality in Yaroslavl Oblast bears this name:

- Nechayevka, Yaroslavl Oblast, a village in Smolensky Rural Okrug of Pereslavsky District
