= Leninkent =

Leninkent (Russian: Ленинкент) is the name of several inhabited localities in the Republic of Dagestan, Russia.

Urban localities

- Leninkent, Makhachkala, Republic of Dagestan, a settlement under the administrative jurisdiction of Kirovsky City District of the City of Makhachkala; 42°58′N 47°21′E

Rural localities

- Leninkent, Karabudakhkentsky District, Republic of Dagestan, a selo in Gubdensky Selsoviet of Karabudakhkentsky District; 42°29′N 47°45′E
