= Novoye Gadari =

Novoye Gadari Новое Гадари Цӏияб Гъадари
- Selo
- Location within Republic of Dagestan Location within Russia
- Coordinates: 43°11′N 46°46′E
- Country: Russia
- Region: Republic of Dagestan
- District: Kizilyurtovsky District
- Time zone: UTC+3:00

Novoye Gadari (Russian: Новое Гадари; Avar: Цӏияб Гъадари) is a rural locality (a selo) in Zubutli-Miatlinsky Selsoviet, Kizilyurtovsky District, Republic of Dagestan, Russia. The population was 798 as of 2010. There are 11 streets.

== Geography ==
Novoye Gadari is located 13 km southwest of Kizilyurt (the district's administrative centre) by road. Zubutli-Miatli and Novy Sulak are the nearest rural localities.

== Nationalities ==
Avars live there.
