= Miatli =

Miatli Миатли Миякьуб
- Selo
- Location within Republic of Dagestan Location within Russia
- Coordinates: 43°04′N 46°49′E
- Country: Russia
- Region: Republic of Dagestan
- District: Kizilyurtovsky District
- Time zone: UTC+3:00

Miatli (Russian: Миатли; Avar: Миякьуб) is a rural locality (a selo) in Kizilyurtovsky District, Republic of Dagestan, Russia. The population was 4,022 as of 2010. There are 52 streets.

== Geography ==
Miatli is located 21 km south of Kizilyurt (the district's administrative centre) by road. Novo-Zubutli and Inchkha are the nearest rural localities.

== Nationalities ==
Avars live there.
