= Zubutli-Miatli =

Zubutli-Miatli Зубутли-Миатли Цlобокь-Миякьо
- Selo
- Location within Republic of Dagestan Location within Russia
- Coordinates: 43°11′N 46°48′E
- Country: Russia
- Region: Republic of Dagestan
- District: Kizilyurtovsky District
- Time zone: UTC+3:00

Zubutli-Miatli (Russian: Зубутли-Миатли; Avar: Цlобокь-Миякьо) is a rural locality (a selo) and the administrative centre of Zubutli-Miatlinsky Selsoviet, Kizilyurtovsky District, Republic of Dagestan, Russia. The population was 4,529 as of 2010. There are 65 streets.

== Geography ==
Zubutli-Miatli is located 10 km west of Kizilyurt (the district's administrative centre) by road, on the Sulak River. Novy Sulak and Novoye Gadari are the nearest rural localities.

== Nationalities ==
Avars live there.
