= List of clashes in the North Caucasus in 2010 =

This is a List of clashes in the North Caucasus - 2010. The North Caucasus is the northern part of the Caucasus region between the Black and Caspian Seas and within European Russia. The term is also used as a synonym for the North Caucasus economic region of Russia. Insurgency in the North Caucasus continues despite the official end of the decade-long Russian counter-terrorist operation in Chechnya on 15 April 2009. Violence is concentrated mostly in the North Caucasus republics of Chechnya, Dagestan, Ingushetia and Kabardino-Balkaria, with only occasional clashes and bombings elsewhere (including Moscow and North Ossetia).

== January ==
- January 2 - At the city hospital in Saratov, a call about a potential bomb scare resulted in 79 patients being evacuated from the building. All the evacuated patients were later placed in other city hospitals. It is unclear if this incident is related to the insurgency.
- January 3 - A gas station exploded along the Kavkaz highway near the settlement of Gazi-Yurt in the Nazranovsky District of Ingushetia. There were no casualties. It has been suggested that the gas station was shot at with a grenade launcher.
- January 4 - A bomb explosion occurred at a railroad on the outskirts of Nazran in Ingushetia, the Interior Ministry reported. Six wagons were reportedly derailed at this site. No casualties were apparently reported in this derailment.
- January 6 - In Nazran, Ingushetia, an MVD major's house was shot at with automatic weapons, causing no injuries to the officer or his family. At least 7 policemen were killed and another 20 were injured after a suicide bomber targeted the base Battalion DPS in Makhachkala, Dagestan. Interior ministry sappers defused an explosive device planted on the Mozdok-Tbilisi gas pipeline in Ingushetia. No injuries were reported at the scene, as this device was being defused. In Nazran, Ingushetia, unidentified militants opened fire on a grocery shop with automatic weapons. This attack reportedly killed a local seller. In Dagestan, on the railroad between Targi and Makhachkala, EOD officials safely neutralized a powerful home-made explosive device. No one was injured. In Makhachkala, two grenades were hurled into the yard of a Ministry of Natural Resources official, but no one was injured in the attack. In Karabulak, Ingushetia unknown assailants detonated an unidentified explosive device at a gas station. However, there were no casualties in this explosion.
- January 7 - In the village of Korkmaskala, Dagestan, in a counter terrorist operation, operatives killed 2 militants after the rebels refused to surrender and exit the building they occupied. During the storming two soldiers were lightly wounded. In Nazran, Ingushetia, one soldier was wounded after unknown assailants fired upon the building where the soldiers were located. The perpetrators fled after this attack. An explosive device detonated in Makhachkala, apparently targeting a police car. The explosion damaged nearly a dozen surrounding buildings but missed the intended target. Later, in Makhachkala, a police officer was gunned down at the doorstep of his own home. The policeman later died on the way to hospital due to the wounds he sustained.
- January 9 - In the village of Babayurt in Dagestan, unknown persons opened fire on traffic police who were in a patrol car. No one was injured in this incident however.
- January 10 - It was reported that 3 militants were killed near Makhachkala after they apparently opened fire on officers from their car. The officers returned fire on the perpetrators killing the three culprits. In Dagestan, a private house in Makhachkala was blocked by riot policemen. Suspected militants were believed to have been stationed in the house. After failed negotiations the authorities killed 1 militant who had allegedly remained in the building.
- January 11 - The Deputy Director General for the Kizlyar Electromechanical Plant was killed in Dagestan. He was reportedly discovered dead with 4 gunshot wounds. This killing is currently under investigation by police. In Makhachkala, EOD operatives from the FSB defused a powerful bomb that had been placed under a car owned by a traffic policeman. In Nazran, Ingushetia, an unknown gunman repeatedly shot at a traffic outpost, causing no casualties however.
- January 12 - In Dagestan, an explosion targeting a police car damaged the vehicle and a nearby house; the policeman inside escaped unhurt. A suspicious device believed to be a bomb, was discovered on the Mozdok gas pipeline in Dagestan. Federal EOD experts summoned to the area delayed the disarming of the bomb until morning. The device detonated at night causing no casualties but damaging the pipeline. Over 170,000 residents were left without natural gas for several days.
- January 14 - In Nazran, Ingushetia, unknown militants opened fire with automatic weapons on the home of a local businessman. Nobody was reportedly injured in this attack. As a result of two ambushes on police in Nazran and the village of Plievo in Ingushetia, 1 police officer was killed and 5 others were injured.
- January 15 - In Ingushetia, 2 policemen were killed and 1 other policeman was injured after unknown gunmen opened fire on a car carrying police officers. A traffic policeman reportedly managed to open fire upon these perpetrators, possibly injuring some of them also in this shoot-out.
- January 18 - In the city of Malgobek, Ingushetia, an architect named Magomed Malsagov, was shot dead by an unidentified militants. In the Sunzhensky District of Ingushetia, a bomb explosion occurred near a passing police car however no law enforcement officers were injured. Another incident occurred after the police put up a cordon near the area of the bomb blast, where an inspection team was working. In this event, a vehicle at high speeds crashed into a truck and continued its direction towards the police. After law enforcement officials demanded the truck driver stop his vehicle to no avail, police opened fire on the vehicle killing the driver.
- January 19 - A special operation has been declared in Chechnya which is tasked with finding and neutralizing the separist leader, Doku Umarov and his inner circle. This operation reportedly involves units of the Chechen republic and the Interior Ministry. In Karabudakhkentskiy raion, Dagestan, 4 militants were killed by police forces when they opened fire upon traffic policemen after being ordered to halt their vehicle.
- January 22 - 1 Russian soldier was killed in Dagestan in mysterious circumstances, after trying to detain a militant involved with illegal armed formations.
- January 26 - In the capital of Ingushetia, Magas, the authorities foiled an attempted assault by militants who had intended to attack the building where the leadership of Ingushetia is based. In Nazran, explosive devices were discovered near the central mosque in the centre of the city. Sappers reportedly managed to defuse this bomb and dismantle a grenade also set up within the area.
- January 27 - In Dagestan, between the Caspian and Makhachkala, unidentified persons opened fire upon the deputy chairman for the Republic. He was reportedly not injured from this incident attack and the perpetrators did manage to flee from the scene. In Ingushetia, a series of attacks occurred. In the village of Troitskaya, in Sunzhensky District, 1 policeman was injured in a clash with militants, his condition is known to be serious. Meanwhile, in the Nazran district, 2 policemen were killed and another 2 were reportedly injured by gunfire in a village within that area after their armoured car, in which they were travelling in was reportedly fired upon by unidentified militants.
- January 28 - On the federal highway Kavkaz, near the village of Gamurzievo, unknown militants opened fire upon a minister for the republic of Ingushetia. His driver was reportedly killed however he was not in the car at the time in which it was attacked and consequently was not injured. In Nalchik, Kabardino-Balkaria, two militants shot a local businessman and his father. The businessman died on the spot, the father was later taken to hospital due to his injuries however he died later on from his wounds.
- January 30 - A police sergeant was arrested in the village of Ekazhevo, Ingushetia, after a large weapons and ammunition cache was discovered at his house. It was alleged that this policeman was aiding and supplying militants within the area with these weapons. In Nazran, Ingushetia, unidentified militants opened fire with automatic weapons upon a local resident. The man reportedly died on the spot due to the wounds that he had sustained.
- January 31 - It was reported that 2 militants were killed by a Spetsnaz unit in the Kaytahskogo district of Dagestan. The militants were reportedly eliminated after they offered armed resistance to law enforcement officers whilst resisting arrest.

== February ==
- February 1 - In Nazran, Ingushetia, a grenade was fired at a kindergarten. The grenade exploded however there were no casualties. Then however, in the same area, an explosive device went off nearby under a bush and wounded 6 people. In addition, another attack occurred in Nazran on the Ingush interior ministry. In this attack multiple rocket-propelled grenades were fired, in which 1 person was killed while another 3 were apparently wounded.
- February 2 - In Nazran, militants fired twice with a grenade launcher at a railway station. There were no injuries in this attack.
- February 3 - In the Botlikh district of Dagestan, 2 militants were killed after law enforcement officers demanded to see documents, to which then there was a skirmish. However it is known that one law enforcement officer was apparently injured in the skirmish.
- February 4 - In the Sunzhensky District of Ingushetia, a district officer who was returning from work was stopped by several militants, to which then a skirmish took place. It is known that 1 man was killed in this skirmish.
- February 5 - In Chechnya, a shootout occurred between militants and soldiers resulted in the deaths of up to 5 Russian soldiers. Another 7 soldiers were reportedly injured in this gun battle. According to preliminary data, 6 militants were also killed in this shootout. In Dagestan, the head of the inter-district department in combating extremism, Gapiz Isaev, was killed after a bomb explosion occurred in the path of his car. A senior Interior Ministry official of Makhachkala was killed when unidentified militants attacked his car. It is known that 2 of his bodyguards and the driver also perished in the ambush.
- February 6 - In the village of Ordzhonikidzevskaya, Ingushetia, a bomb exploded which wounded the chief of staff, Magomed Agiev, who is the chief for the Sunzhensky police department.
- February 7 - In Ingushetia, in the village of Ordzhonikidzevskaya, unknown militants opened fire upon a sergeant for the local police department and local residents, who were nearby. As a result of this shooting, it is known that the police sergeant and a local civilian were killed at the scene.
- February 8 - In Makhachkala, Dagestan, two powerful explosive devices, found in cars were defused by experts, on the outskirts of the city.
- February 10 - 1 militant was killed in Makhachkala, after an explosion occurred from the bomb that the militant was planting on the railway track.
- February 11–12 - In Ingushetia a special operation lasting a few days, to eliminate a large group of militants in the Sunhensky region was launched. At the end of the first day it had been reported that 11 militants were killed and one employee for the local Interior ministry was injured. On the second day of this operation, it had been reported that up to 20 militants had been killed in the ongoing operation.
- February 13 - In Ingushetia, security forces managed to recover 14 corpses of suspected militants who were killed in an ongoing operation, that was being conducted over the past few days. It is also known that at least 4 local residents were also killed in this gun-battle after they got caught up in the fire-fight. Two more residents were also seriously injured in this gun-battle.
- February 14 - In the Urus-Martan district Chechnya, unidentified militants opened fire at the house of a district official with a rocket launcher. There were reportedly no injuries at the scene of this attack. In Nazran, Ingushetia, unidentified militants opened fire on a passenger car in the district of Gamurzievo. In the shooting it is known that 1 person was killed at the scene and 2 others were reportedly injured. Later on it was confirmed that 2 policemen and a young woman were killed in this shooting, and that another policeman had also sustained serious injuries, when their car came under attack. In Ingushetia, authorities managed to identify nine of the 14 dead militants that were killed in the operations conducted a few days ago. The security forces also established the names of the four residents, who were also killed in fighting within that area of fighting.
- February 15 - The authorities have now established the identities of all the 18 militants, which were killed by the security forces, in the Sunzhensky District of Ingushetia. It was reported that 18 militants were killed, 2 security officials were wounded and 4 civilians were killed. In Ingushetia, a bomb that had been discovered near a high school, in the village of Ordzhonikidzevskaya exploded. Nobody at the scene was reportedly injured in this bomb blast.
- February 16 - It has been calculated that the overall cost of the Nevsky Express bombing caused by terrorists from the North Caucasus, in November last year, has cost the Russian Railways company an estimated 180 million rubles.
- February 17 - In the Untsukulskom district of Dagestan, 2 riot policemen were wounded after militants reportedly fired at their checkpoint, from a nearby mountain.
- February 18 - In Nazran, Ingushetia, militants opened fire with automatic weapons on a private house, which was home to Rustam Haluhaev, who works for the Counter Terrorism ministry of internal affairs of the republic. Nobody was injured in this attack.
- February 19 - At least three explosions, at intervals of 20–30 minutes occurred in Nazran, Ingushetia, due to the effects of improvised explosive devices. In these explosions it is known that 2 people were killed and that another 35 were reportedly wounded.
- February 20 - In Dagestan, in the Gergebilskom region of the republic, 2 police officers were killed after militants opened fire on them, with automatic weapons from a nearby forest. A local resident was also reportedly injured in the shooting. In Ingushetia, the Head of an inter-registration and examination department, was fired upon in the Nazran district. He was not injured in this shooting. In Nazran, Ingushetia, militants opened fire upon a car, in which there were three local residents. Nobody was killed however all 3 residents were apparently injured in this attack.
- February 22 - 2 police officers were killed by unidentified militants whilst in their car, in the Khasavyurt district, within the republic of Dagestan. In Beslan, North Ossetia, a grenade attack killed 1 child and injured 2 other children.
- February 23 - An FSB operative was shot dead by militants whilst he was in a car within the village of Ordzhonikidzevskaya, in Ingushetia. A resident from Nazran, who was also in the car with him at the time of this shooting, was apparently injured in this attack.
- February 24 - In Dagestan, police officers detained and arrested 5 suspected militants who were believed to have been connected to the killing of the Minister of Internal Affairs for Dagestan, Adilgereya Magomedtagirov. In Dagestan, a top traffic police official was shot dead when unidentified militants opened fire upon his car, on the Hasavurt-Novolakskoye highway.
- February 25 - In Ingushetia, in the center of Nazran, police defused three explosive devices that were positioned near the Interior ministry office, a police official has said. One explosive device reportedly detonated and injured 3 local residents. The police were reportedly searching this house after having a shootout with militants. There were no casualties among the police or the attackers in this firefight.
- February 26 - In Nazran, Ingushetia, unknown militants fired upon a store in the vegetable-oil factory. In this shooting, it is known that 1 person was killed and that another was apparently injured.
- February 27 - In the Leninsky district of Grozny in Chechnya, an explosive device detonated resulting in an explosion, which wounded a police sergeant. It has also been reported that two days before this incident, a similar attack occurred within the same district of Grozny. On this occasion an explosive device exploded near an electrical pylon and 1 person was apparently wounded.
- February 28 - Police in the central district of Nazran, Ingushetia, discovered a large weapons cache in a garage. It has been reported that the cache included a grenade launcher, about 2,000 cartridges and six electric detonators.

== March ==
- March 1 - In Nazran, Ingushetia, grenades were launched by unknown militants against a freight train. The attack took place in the central station in Nazran. Nobody was reportedly injured in this attack.
- March 2 - In the Nazran district of Ingushetia, a regime of counter terrorist operations has been introduced into the area. It was reported that 4 militants have already been killed by law enforcement officers in the village of Ekazhevo. However it was then later reported that 6 militants had been killed in this operation and that a further six more were detained by the law enforcement officers. In Makhachkala, Dagestan, a bomb exploded at a private house resulting in the wounding of 1 man who was reportedly assembling an explosive device. The suspected militant was later taken to hospital under an armed guard.
- March 3 - In the Derbent region of Dagestan, unknown militants opened fire on law enforcement officers. It was reported that 2 officers were apparently wounded in this attack.
- March 4 - A leader of the militants in the North Caucasus has been identified as Alexander Tikhomirov he is also known by some as Said Buryat. He was reportedly among the 6 militants who were killed in fighting within the area. The FSB has also claimed that 10 militants were arrested in this raid.
- March 5 - The authorities have reportedly established that the dead terrorist Said Buryat and some militants were preparing for a major terrorist attack. This attack however was prevented when law enforcement officers killed him and his militants.
- March 6 - The president of Ingushetia, Yunus-Bek Yevkurov, met with people who were associated with the special operation and the killing of Said Buryat a few days ago. It was reported that 1 militant, who had participated in an attack on policemen was killed in Derbent, Dagestan, during a special operation.
- March 7 - In the city of Khasavyurt, in Dagestan, an improvised explosive device was discovered in the back room at the municipal cemetery.
- March 8 - In Nalchik, Kabardino-Balkaria, a skirmish between a militant and police officers occurred. In has been reported that 2 policemen and 1 civilian were wounded in this skirmish. However 1 militant was reportedly killed.
- March 9 - In the Kizylar district of Dagestan, a Muslim school teacher was killed by unidentified militants.
- March 10 - Ten militants who were captured last week in the special operation within Ingushetia, have been formally arrested in connection with the derailment of the Nevsky Express train.
- March 11 - 4 militants were reportedly killed in the mountains south of Chechnya, in an operation near the village of Nokhtch-Keloi, located in the Shatoi district of the republic. No police or law-enforcement personnel were injured in this operation. In the Kirov district of Makhachkala, Dagestan, a bomb detonated under a freight train and derailed three cars off the rails. No casualties were reported in this derailment. On the federal highway Kavkaz, unidentified militants opened fired on a DPS post with grenade launchers and automatic weapons. In this attack, it has been reported that 2 soldiers were injured.
- March 13 - In Khasavyurt, Dagestan, unknown persons detonated an explosive device near the building of the baliff service. There were reportedly an unspecified number of injured people at the scene. It was reported that 4 militants were killed in a raid, in the village of Zubutli-Miately within the Kizilyurt district of Dagestan in a special operation.
- March 14 - In Chechnya, 2 policemen were killed in a shootout with militants near to the border with Ingushetia. In Dagestan, 3 police employees were injured after their car hit an explosive device on the highway of Khasavyurt-Babayurt, on the outskirts of Khasavyurt.
- March 15 - 2 Russian soldiers were reportedly killed in a clash In Chechnya with militants, just 10 kilometers from the Chechen village of Bamut. The militants apparently suffered no losses in this particular clash.
- March 17 - In Chechnya, authorities found and blocked a bandit group of up to 20 militants, which may have possible links and informatives from Al-Qaeda in a special operation. At least 4 militants have already been killed in a shootout and it is known that 1 policeman is also known to have been killed in the shootout while another policeman was reportedly wounded. Several of these militants were reportedly wounded in the gun-fight with security forces.
- March 18 - In Chechnya, in the ongoing operation, it has now been reported that 6 militants have been killed in the fighting within the area. However it is known that 3 policemen are also believed to have been killed so far and another 2 others were reportedly wounded. In Nazran, Ingushetia unknown militants opened fire upon a DPS post with automatic weapons and rocket-propelled grenades. In this attack, it is known that 3 policemen were wounded as a result of this militant assault.
- March 19 - In Dagestan, unidentified militants opened fire upon a police investigator from the Khasavyurt police department, in the village of Batayurt. The investigator reportedly died due to the wounds that he had sustained.
- March 20 - In Dagestan, three bomb explosions resulted in 1 person being killed and 2 others being injured. It has been reported that, a student was the known fatality in one of the blasts.
- March 22 - In Makhachkala, Dagestan, a counter terrorist operation has been imposed upon a street located within the city. Later on it was reported that 1 militant had been killed during the special operation and that an FSB officer had been wounded.
- March 23 - A special operation in the village of Surkhakhi, within the Nazran district of Ingushetia has resulted in the deaths of 3 militants. It is known that 3 police officers were apparently injured in this operation.
- March 24 - In Ingushetia, in the village of Ordzhanikidzevskya, an armoured police vehicle was damaged on the road after hitting a mine planted by militants. The casualties were not specified.
- March 25 – In Nalchik, Kabardino-Balkaria, law enforcement officers conducted a special operation. In this operation it is known that one militant was killed and another was apparently wounded. It is known that one police officer was also wounded in this operation. The house head of administration in the Nazran district within Ingushetia, Bagaudina Mutsolgov, was fired upon with automatic weapons by unknown persons. There were no reported injuries in this attack.
- March 26 – Three police officers were injured in Chechnya after an explosive device detonated. The explosion occurred in the Vedensky district of the republic. In Makhachkala, Dagestan, a bomb exploded in the path of a convoy with the head office of Russian Agricultural Bank present among them. This bomb explosion reportedly caused no casualties. Meanwhile, in Khasavyurt within Dagestan, unknown militants opened fire upon an owner of a shop, known as Shamil Abdurakhmanov. As a result of the wounds that he had sustained, it is known that the man later died of his injuries. In the village of Aksai, within the Khasavyurt district of Dagestan, unknown militants opened fire with automatic weapons upon a crowd of villagers. It is known that 5 people were injured as a result of this shooting however it was reported later on that two suspects were detained over this shooting.
- March 27 – One militant was killed in a special operation, near the city of Nazran, in the republic of Ingushetia. In a separate incident, it is also known that shooting had been heard in the village of Pliyevo, within Ingushetia. Law enforcement officers in the republic, did not make any comments on this report however.
- March 28 - Police in the Russian Urals republic of Bashkortostan have detained 8 suspected militants on charges of being involved in terrorist actions during a special operation.
- March 29 – A suicide bombing on the Moscow Metro is believed to have been done by two women from the North Caucasus region. The two bombs were set off at the height of rush hour killing at least 40 people and wounding more than 100 others. Russian officials say that two Shahidka female suicide bombers set off the two suicide blasts within an hour of each other. No group immediately claimed responsibility for these latest suicide bombings however there were suspicions at the time that the Caucasus Emirate was behind these suicide attacks. This was later confirmed, as their militant leader, Doku Umarov on a militant video link, later claimed responsibility for these twin suicide attacks.
- March 30 – The president of Ingushetia, Yunus-Bek Yevkurov, has ordered law enforcement officers in the republic to probe the relatives of militants killed in recent police sweeps across the republic. This certain procedure comes after two suicide bomb attacks occurred on the Moscow Metro the previous day.
- March 31 – In the centre of the city of Kizlyar, in Dagestan, two suicide bomb explosions occurred near the buildings of the Interior Ministry and the FSB. In these explosions, it is known that at least 12 people, including nine policemen, were killed and that another 29 people others were reportedly injured. In the Sergokalinskogo district of Dagestan, unknown militants opened fire with automatic weapons on a road patrol. In this attack, it is known that 1 policeman was seriously wounded. It is known that 1 militant was killed by security forces in Nalchik, Kabardino-Balkaria. The dead gunman was later identified.

== April ==
- April 1 - A car bomb explosion occurred in the Khasavyurt district of Dagestan, resulting in the deaths of 2. It was reported that 1 person was also seriously injured in this bomb blast.
- April 2 - A bomb was discovered in a graveyard on the outskirts of the village of Oguzer near Kizlyar. This device however was later defused by the police.
- April 3 - In Kizilyurt, Dagestan, unidentified militants opened fire upon police officers. In this attack, according to preliminary reports, it is known that 1 policeman was killed and that another was injured. In Dagestan, 2 policemen were killed and 1 other policeman was apparently wounded after a shootout occurred between two police forces.
- April 4 - Two bomb explosions derailed a freight train in the Karabudakhkent district near Makhachkala, Dagestan. No one was reportedly injured in the derailment.
- April 5 - In Karabulak, Ingushetia, at least 2 police officers were killed and another 13 were injured after two bomb blasts, occurred. It is known that at least one of these blasts was carried out by a suicide bomber whereas the second blast was the result of a car bomb.
- April 6 - 1 soldier from Interior Ministry was killed and another one was reportedly injured when a bomb exploded while they were passing by, in Avtury, Chechnya.
- April 7 - In Kabardino-Balkaria, unknown militants travelling in a car, opened fire upon a police patrol car near a bus station. It has been reported that 2 policemen were killed in this attack.
- April 8 - In Makhachkala, Dagestan, an explosive device detonated near to a private house, resulting in a powerful explosion. In this blast, it is known that 1 civilian was injured.
- April 9 - In Nazran, Ingushetia, 3 security force personnel were severely wounded after the security forces confronted 3 militants who were trapped inside a private household in a special operation. It is known that all 3 militants were later killed and that the house they were blocked up in was almost completely destroyed. It was reported later on that a female suicide bomber had managed to break through the police cordon. In the suicide attack, it had later been reported that 1 law enforcement officer was killed.
- April 10 - In Nalchik, Kabardino-Balkaria, an explosive device detonated on a car killing a police colonel who was also reportedly the Head of a Criminal Investigation Department within the local area.
- April 11 - A counter-terrorist operation has been introduced within a forest, in the Karabudahkentskogo district of Dagestan. In the Urus-Martan district of Chechnya, 1 soldier from the interior troops was killed in an explosion due to the effects of an improvised explosive device. Meanwhile, in Chechnya, 3 militants were detained by the authorities in different areas of the republic.
- April 12 - In the ongoing operation within the republic of Dagestan, it has now been reported that 3 interior ministry troops were killed and that another 7 were reportedly injured. It was later reported that 2 militants had also been killed in this ongoing operation.
- April 14 - In Makhachkala, Dagestan, 1 policeman was wounded after unidentified militants opened fire at a police patrol DPS. Police at the scene also managed to discover an explosive device within the area, which they later defused at the scene.
- April 15 - In Dagestan, law enforcement officers have blocked in a group of militants, who are reportedly locked up inside a private house. It was later reported that 2 militants were killed in this special operation. Meanwhile, in Makhachkala, Dagestan, explosive experts defused two explosive devices that they discovered inside a car.
- April 16 - In Chechnya, two explosions occurred within the Achkhoi-Martan district of the republic resulting in the deaths of 3 soldiers and it is known that 1 other soldier was also reportedly wounded. Meanwhile, in the Urus-Martan district of the republic, riot policemen clashed with militants. In this clash it has been reported that 1 policeman was killed in a gun-fight with the militants.
- April 17 - In Chechnya, an unknown group of about 4-6 militants ambushed two police vehicles in Urus-Martan district of the republic. It has been reported that in this ambush, at least 1 policeman had been killed.
- April 19 - In Ingushetia, a bomb exploded in the car of the acting deputy Interior Minister, for the southern Russian republic. In this blast, it is known that 1 civilian was wounded, as a result of this bomb explosion.
- April 20 - In Makhachkala, Dagestan, 2 police officers were killed by unknown militants in a shootout within the republic's capital city. Two bomb explosions occurred within the centre of Makhachkala, Dagestan. In these blasts it is known that at least 2 people were wounded in these bomb explosions.
- April 21 - In Kabardino-Balkaria, a shootout occurred between militants and law enforcement officers. In this shootout, it is known that 2 militants were killed. It has been reported that no police officers were killed or injured in this particular skirmish.
- April 22 - In the village of Krasny Voskhod, within the Kizlyar district of Dagestan, unidentified gunmen killed the district's Cossack society member who was known by some as 'Ataman'.
- April 23 - In Chechnya, a weapons cache was discovered in the forest on the outskirts of Verkhny Naur settlement. 2 militants were also detained by the authorities in different areas of the same republic, one of which was wounded during his detainment.
- April 25 - In the village of Karlanyurt, within the Khasavyurt district of Dagestan, an unidentified explosive device detonated near to the entrance of a shop. Nobody was reportedly injured in this bomb explosion.
- April 27 - In the village of Gazi-Yurt, within the Nazran district of Ingushetia, unidentified militants opened fire with rocket-propelled grenades and small arms upon a federal highway cafe. No one was reportedly injured in this attack. On the outskirts of the village Toturbiykala, near the federal highway Kavkaz in Dagestan, 2 militants were killed by security forces within the local area.
- April 29 - In the village of Arkabash within the Kazbekovskom district of Dagestan, a suicide bomber detonated his explosives whilst in a car, at a traffic police checkpoint. In this suicide blast, it is known that 2 policemen were killed and that another 17 others were reportedly injured. In Nalchik, Kabardino-Balkaria, it is known that 2 policemen were seriously wounded after a bomb explosion occurred within the courtyard of an apartment building.

== May ==
- May 1 - In Nalchik, Kabardino-Balkaria, an explosion caused by an explosive device, occurred on a platform of the Republican racetrack on Labour Day. In this bombing it was reported later on that 1 person had been killed in this bombing and that 30 other people had apparently been injured. An unknown militant opened fire at a sport centre in the city of Nazran within the republic of Ingushetia. In this attack 1 militant was reportedly killed by police officers who had returned fire at the assailant. Nobody else besides the militant was reportedly killed or injured in this attack.
- May 2 - In Kabardino-Balkaria, an unidentified militant opened fire at a checkpoint with an automatic weapon and in the process 1 police officer was reportedly wounded. In Nazran, within the republic of Ingushetia, unidentified militants fired twice with a grenade launcher at a private household in a municipal district of the city. Nobody was reportedly hurt in this attack. In the republic of Dagestan, a group of up to 10 militants attacked a gas distribution station and stormed into the complex. Sections and parts of this station were reportedly blown up by the militants and it is known that connection with the gas stations within the republic was momentarily lost. In Chechnya, within the village of Agishty within the Shali district of the republic, it has been reported that 2 militants were detained over having connections with armed groups in the area. Meanwhile, within the outskirts of this particular village, it is known that 2 militants were killed in a skirmish with security forces. It has also been reported that no security personnel were reportedly killed or injured in the shoot-out.
- May 3 - An unknown militant launched a grenade attack upon a police station on the federal highway of Kavkaz, near to the city of Nazran, in Ingushetia. It is known that 11 police officers were reportedly injured in this attack.
- May 4 - It is known that several highland districts within the republic of Dagestan still remain without mobile communication, as well as special communication lines after the recent militant attack.
- May 5 - In Nazran, Ingushetia, 1 militant leader was killed by security forces who had surrounded him whilst he had hid inside a mosque. It is also known that 2 local people were severely wounded in this gunfight. In Makhachkala, Dagestan, the owner of a major radio show along with his bodyguard were killed by unknown militants after his car was ambushed and fired upon with automatic weapons by unidentified militants. It is known that 1 person also sustained serious injuries in this ambush.
- May 6 - 1 militant was killed after a clash with security forces near the village of Pionerskoe, Grozny raion, in Chechnya. Government forces were still combing the area on May 6, searching for 2 more rebels that escaped the original engagement.
- May 7 - In Derbent within the republic of Dagestan, an explosive device exploded near to a railway station. In this bombing it is known that at least 1 person was killed and that another 5 others were reportedly injured.
- May 8 - 1 policeman was seriously injured after a bomb attached to the policeman's car exploded in the town of Tyrnyauz within the republic of Kabardino-Balkaria.
- May 9 - 1 Russian soldier was killed in Kaspiysk within the republic of Dagestan, after a suspicious package containing a bomb exploded, as he was examining the device.
- May 10 - In the republic of Kabardino-Balkaria, near to the town of Baskan, unknown perpetrators opened fire with automatic weapons upon a queue of policemen. In this attack, it is known that 1 policeman had reportedly been killed. It was reported later on that within the town of Baksan, the authorities discovered a package, which was an improvised explosive device. This explosive device was later defused.
- May 11 - A transport policeman who had been wounded in the bomb explosion at the railway station in the town of Derbent, in Dagestan has died. Therefore, the total number of those killed in this explosion has now reached 2 people while another 8 others were reportedly wounded in this bomb blast.
- May 12 - In the republic of Kabardino-Balkaria, an unidentified explosive device detonated next to a car, which was carrying two police officers. In this blast, it is known that 2 police officers in the car and 1 civilian were injured due to the effects of this explosion. Meanwhile, in another district within the republic, a car explosion occurred. It has been reported that 1 militant was killed in this explosion, another was wounded and the other 2 militants apparently managed to escape from this blast.
- May 13 - In the republic of Dagestan, it is known that 8 people were killed after a vehicle carrying maintenance workers was blown up by an explosive device. It has also been reported that 4 police officers had also been injured in this particular attack, which had been perpetuated by unidentified militants. The Russian authorities killed 3 militants who had allegedly been behind the recent Moscow Metro bombings in late March of this year.
- May 14 - In Khasavyurt, Dagestan, unidentified assailants opened fire with automatic weapons upon a car. In this ambush, it is known that 2 people were killed and that both of the victims had reportedly died at the scene of this attack. In Nazran, Ingushetia, a police car came under fire from suspected militants in the Pliyevo district of the city. In this attack it is known that 2 police officers were wounded. In the city of Tyrnyauz within the republic of Kabardino-Balkaria, unidentified militants opened fire with automatic weapons at a police car. In this attack it was reported that 1 police officer was injured.
- May 15 - In Nazran, Ingushetia, unidentified militants opened fire several times with a grenade launcher upon a police headquarters. Nobody was apparently injured in this attack.
- May 16 - In Nalchik, Kabardino-Balkaria, unknown militants threw a bomb into the yard owned by the Minister of Construction and Architecture for the republic. Nobody was reportedly injured in this explosion.
- May 17 - In Grozny, Chechnya, a bomb explosion from the effects of a suspicious package, killed a high-ranking colonel from the Criminal Investigation Department. It has also been reported that 2 police officers and 1 civilian were apparently injured in this bomb blast.
- May 19 - A series of clashes, as well as one bomb attack occurred within the southern Russian republics of both Dagestan and Chechnya between law enforcement officers and militants. In these clashes, it is known that 3 police officers were killed and that 1 militant had also been killed.
- May 20 - In Makhachkala, Dagestan, unidentified militants opened fire at law enforcement officials within the republic's capital city, as their car was being checked for documents. In this attack it is known that 1 policeman had been killed.
- May 21 - In Kabardino-Balkaria, unidentified militant's shot dead a Deputy Prosecutor for the town of Baksan.
- May 22 - In Nazran, Ingushetia, unknown militants attacked a car carrying investigators. In this attack it is known that 2 people were injured.
- May 23 - In Chechnya, it has been reported that 2 militants were killed by security forces in a special operation within the republic. No casualties were reported amongst the security personnel so far, in this particular operation.
- May 24 - In Kabardino-Balkaria, a powerful homemade explosive device was found near to the Eternal Flame Memorial, in the city of Tyrnyauz. This explosive device apparently had the explosive power of about 1 kg of TNT equivalent however it was later defused.
- May 25 - In Chechnya, it has been reported that 2 Russian servicemen of the Interior Troops were injured after an unidentified explosive device detonated on the roadside, in the Shali district of the republic. In the republic of Kabardino-Balkaria, it is known that 3 people were injured after two explosions took place within the town of Tyrnyauz. In the same republic, it was reported that a powerful bomb explosion later took place within the city of Nalchik, in the republic of Kabardino-Balkaria. No casualties were reported in this particular bombing. It has been reported also that an act of terrorism involving a grenade and a clockwork was prevented by the authorities, which had been positioned near to the entrance of a building near to city and regional police stations within the local area.
- May 26 - In Chechnya, it has been reported that 2 militants were killed in a security sweep within the Urus-Martan district of the republic. It has also been reported that no security personnel were injured or killed while conducting this particular operation. A bombing occurred within the centre of the southern Russian city of Stavropol. In this bombing it is known that at least 6 people were killed and more than 40 others were injured after this blast occurred near to a cafe within the city centre. Terrorists from the North Caucasus are suspected.
- May 27 - A day of national mourning was declared for the next day after a bombing occurred within the southern Russian city of Stavropol. In this bombing it is now known that at least 8 people had been killed and that more than 45 others were reportedly injured.
- May 28 - It is known that the FSB in Ingushetia detained 2 male suspects whom they assumed were involved in the recent bombing within the city of Stavropol.
- May 29 - In Dagestan, it has been reported that security forces killed 3 militants near the village of Bata-Yurt, according to the Khasavyurt police department. No law enforcement officers were reportedly killed or injured in this shoot-out. At least 1 policeman was killed and another 2 other policemen were wounded, as a result of a roadside bombing, which struck their vehicle within the republic of Dagestan.
- May 30 - In Ingushetia, it has been reported that the authorities have now detained 3 people in connection with the attack on the southern Russian city of Stavropol. However the FSB have not confirmed this information, with regards these detained suspects.
- May 31 - In Ingushetia, an explosion occurred inside a cafe within a commercial market in the village of Ordzhonikidzevskaya, in the Sunzhensky District of the republic. In this bomb blast, it is known that at least 2 policemen were severely wounded.

== June ==
- June 1 - In the city of Nalchik within the republic of Kabardino-Balkaria, unidentified gunmen opened fire at a traffic police car, which housed two police officers. It has been reported however that no police officers were killed or injured in this attack. A grenade was also found near the building of the Interior Department for Nalchik however this explosive device was then destroyed immediately by the authorities. In Ingushetia, a terrorist attack was averted on a road, at a police post on the federal highway Kavkaz, in the Nazran district of the republic. The authorities reportedly found a homemade explosive device upon the road however this device was later defused.
- June 2 - In Dagestan, an FSB agent of the regional department and a local resident were killed in a shootout with a group of militants, in the Karabudakhkent district of the republic. It has been reported that 2 law enforcement officers and 1 local resident were also injured in this gunfight.
- June 3 - In Makhachkala, Dagestan, the FSB and MVD forces stormed a private house, which was allegedly housing a suspected militant group. It is suspected that at least 3 gunmen are currently hiding inside this house. In Kabardino-Balkaria, the authorities defused two improvised explosive devices. It was later reported that both devices were defused. In Dagestan, it was later reported that all 3 militants inside the house, which had been surrounded had been killed by the authorities. It is also known that no law enforcement personnel were killed or injured whilst conducting this operation.
- June 4 - In Malgobek, Ingushetia a series of attacks occurred in numerous areas across the city, which resulted in the deaths of at least 2 policemen and the wounding of a further 25 others. The first attack involved two explosions, which occurred near to a monument within the centre of the city. Nobody was reportedly injured in these two blasts. However, an unidentified militant then threw a grenade towards police officers and opened fire with a pistol. The 1 militant was then killed by the authorities in the return-fire. No casualties were reported amongst any of the police officers in this engagement. Meanwhile, in the village of Sagopshi, unidentified militants stormed into a grocery shop and killed 1 civilian who was working at the store. An explosive device then left behind by the militants exploded, as the police forces later arrived at the scene. In this bomb blast it was reported that at least 2 police officer's was killed and that a further 25 other people were reportedly injured. In Makhachkala, Dagestan, unidentified militants opened fire with automatic weapons upon a crowd outside a mosque on the outskirts of the city, killing 1 civilian and wounding another. It was later reported that the dead civilian was later identified to have been the imam of the local mosque.
- June 5 - In Tyrnyauz, Kabardino-Balkaria, the authorities discovered a large number of bombs near a bridge and thus prevented a devastating attack. Meanwhile, on the outskirts at the city of Nalchik within the same republic, the authorities managed to uncover and seize a large weapons cache used by militants.
- June 6 - In Nalchik, Kabardino-Balkaria, the authorities managed to foil a major terrorist attack upon a gas distribution centre within the city. The local security forces apparently managed to discover three unidentified explosive devices however it was later reported that all of these explosive devices were later defused at the scene.
- June 7 - In the Khasavyurt district of Dagestan, unidentified militants opened fire with automatic weapons at a car, which housed an OMON sergeant along with his brother. In this attack it has been reported that nobody was reportedly injured or killed.
- June 8 - In Makhachkala, Dagestan, 4 people were injured after an unidentified explosive device detonated in the republic's capital city. In Nazran, Ingushetia, 2 militants were killed by FSB forces after they opened fire upon the authorities, when asked to provide documents in their vehicle. It was also later reported that no casualties were reportedly sustained by the security forces in this engagement. In Dagestan within the Untsukulsky region, a local judge was killed by unidentified gunmen inside his home. It is known that he reportedly died at the scene of this attack.
- June 9 - In Malgobek, Ingushetia, the FSB managed to arrest one of the major rebel warlords in the North Caucasus, known as the militant leader known as Ali Tazieff but who was nicknamed by some as 'Magas'. It is also known that this militant leader had very close connections with the former Chechen rebel leader Shamil Basayev and that he was one of the most wanted rebel leaders within the North Caucasus.
- June 10 - In Makhachkala, Dagestan, a bomb exploded near to a convoy of police vehicles. In this explosion it is known that 2 police officers were wounded. In Chechnya, in a forest within the Vedeno region in the south-west of the republic, at least 10 militants were killed by security forces in a special operation. It has also been reported that a Jordanian National was apparently amongst those who had been killed in this particular operation.
- June 11 - In Kizlyar, Dagestan, unidentified militants opened fire upon a senior police sergeant, as he was coming out of a store. In this attack, it is known that 1 policeman was killed at the scene of this attack. Meanwhile, within the village of Kichi-Ghamri, in the same republic, unidentified gunmen opened fire with automatic weapons upon a forester. In this attack it is known that 1 civilian was apparently killed in this shooting. In Nalchik, Kabardino-Balkaria, unknown militants opened fire upon a police inspector, at a stationery post within a busy street in the city's centre. It was later reported that 1 police inspector was killed in this attack.
- June 12 - In Chechnya within the Vedeno district of the republic, it is known that security forces killed 3 militants in a special operation, which was conducted by forces from both the FSB and the local law enforcement agencies. In Ingushetia within the Gamurziyevsky district, unknown militants opened fire upon an Interior Ministry convoy. In this attack, it was later reported that 2 police officers were wounded in this overnight militant ambush.
- June 13 - In Derbent, Dagestan, it has been reported that 2 police officers were killed and that 1 other policeman was apparently wounded after militants launched an attack upon an entry post. In Makhachkala, Dagestan, unknown militants threw a grenade into a grocery store within the republic's capital city. In this attack, it was later reported by the authorities that at least 4 people had been wounded, as a result of this grenade explosion. In Vladikavkaz, North Ossetia, a WBC youth world champion was shot dead at a nightclub within the republic's capital city of Vladikavkaz.
- June 14 - In Nalchik, Kabardino-Balkaria, unidentified militants opened fire upon a car with automatic weapons. At least 2 people were killed in this attack.
- June 15 - In Makhachkala, Dagestan, an unidentified militant sniper opened fire upon a DPS post, killing 1 police officer who was guarding this police post. In Nalchik, Kabardino-Balkaria, 1 FSB officer was wounded after an explosive device exploded, as the FSB officer was opening the door of his garage.
- June 16 - In Derbent, Dagestan, unidentified militants opened fire with automatic weapons killing 1 policeman in the street. In the village of Upper Zhentala, Chereksky region within the republic of Kabardino-Balkaria, unknown militants opened fire upon a senior police sergeant, as he was leaving his home. In this attack, it was later reported that 1 police sergeant was killed in this attack.
- June 18 - In Kaspiysk, Dagestan, a senior FSB intelligence officer was killed and 2 other security officers were wounded by unidentified militants in a shootout within the republic.
- June 19 - In Khasavyurt, Dagestan, it was reported that 1 senior police sergeant had been killed by militants after unidentified assailants opened fire with automatic weapons from a car, as this police officer when he was walking along the street.
- June 22 - In Chechnya within the village of Yarish-Mardi, militants attacked a Russian military convoy. In this militant attack, it was reported that 4 Russian soldiers were killed and that another 5 other soldiers were reportedly injured in this ambush. Another attack also took place within the same republic within the Vendensky district and on this occasion it was reported that 1 police guard was killed and 2 others were apparently wounded in a separate militant attack.
- June 24 - In Dagestan within the Buinaksk region of the republic, it was reported that 2 police officers were killed after unidentified gunmen opened fire upon them as they were coming out of their office buildings.
- June 25 - In Nazran, Ingushetia, an explosive device detonated under a car, which housed a traffic police officer. As a result of this bomb explosion, it was reported that 1 traffic police officer was reportedly wounded. It was later reported that within the same area of the Nazran district in Ingushetia that 2 policemen were killed and that 1 other policeman was seriously wounded after militants attacked their patrol car. In Kabardino-Balkaria within the village of Nartan, in the Chegemsky district of the republic, it was reported that 1 policeman was killed and another policeman was wounded as a result of a militant attack involving an assault by unidentified militants.
- June 26 - In Dagestan within the Karabudahkentskom district during a special operation within the republic, it was reported by the authorities that 1 policeman had been killed and 2 others were reportedly injured in an ongoing counter-terrorist operation. It is known that 1 militant had also been killed in these clashes with the security forces in the area. In Malgobek, Ingushetia, a bomb explosion occurred at the gate of a local policeman's house under the passenger car owned by the policeman. It was later reported that at least 1 policeman had been killed in this bomb explosion.
- June 27 - In Dagestan, a special operation is currently underway to neutralise a group of militants who are currently held up inside a house within the republic. It has been reported by the authorities that up to 3 militants are blocked inside this house.
- June 28 - In Derbent, Dagestan it was reported that 2 militants had been killed in the ongoing operation within the area. No law-enforcement officers were reportedly killed or wounded whilst conducting this particular operation to storm the house, in which the militants were hiding out.
- June 29 - In Dagestan, a bomb explosion derailed a freight train on the line rail Manas-Achi. It was later reported that a locomotive and two water tanks ran off the rails in this explosion. No casualties were apparently reported in this derailment.
- June 30 - In Khasavyurt, Dagestan, unidentified militants in a car opened fire with automatic weapons upon a police officer at a DPS post. It was later reported that 1 policeman was seriously injured in this militant attack. In the centre of Grozny within the republic of Chechnya, a suicide bomber blew himself up killing himself and wounding 7 other people. It has been reported that this suicide bomber may have possibly tried to assassinate the Chechen President Ramzan Kadyrov who had reportedly been attending at the time of this suicide bombing.

== July ==
- July 1 - In Dagestan near to the capital city of Makhachkala, it was reported that 3 people were killed in a car bomb explosion. This discovery was reportedly made in a wooded area approximately 15 km from the republic's capital city of Makhachkala.
- July 2 - In Dagestan, on the railway line Manas-Achi, a freight train with 9 cars derailed from the line as a result of a bomb explosion. In this derailment it was later reported that 2 people were injured.
- July 4 - In Dagestan, unidentified militants opened fire at a police vehicle, wounding 1 police officer. Meanwhile, on a road to the capital city of the republic in Makhachkala, an unidentified explosive device detonated near a policeman's car only a few meters away from an airport terminal. It was reported that in this blast, that 1 policeman was apparently injured in this bomb explosion. In another area of the republic, the authorities managed to seize an automatic weapon and ammunition, which belongs to an unknown militant within the local area. In Makhachkala, Dagestan, a bomb explosion, which was hidden in the trash detonated near to the roadside and wounded 2 people.
- July 5 - In the Nazran district of Ingushetia, it was reported that 2 Russian soldiers were killed and 4 others were injured after unidentified militants opened fire upon two military cars in the republic. In the village of Gubden within the republic of Dagestan, unidentified militants opened fire upon at a convoy of soldiers with automatic weapons. It was later reported by the authorities that 1 policeman had been wounded in this militant attack. Meanwhile, in the Khasavyurt district within the same republic, unidentified militants opened fire with rifle-launched grenades, at the house of the district police chief. In this shelling, it was later known that 1 policeman was wounded.
- July 6 - In the Vedensky district of Chechnya, it was reported that 1 Russian soldier was killed and that 2 other soldiers were injured after unidentified militants opened fire with automatic weapons upon the authorities.
- July 7 - In Dagestan, it was reported that 2 people were killed on the outskirts of the republic's capital city of Makhachkala. Reports have claimed that shooting and explosions were heard in the area before the police discovered the remains of 2 people within a burnt-out car. In Dagestan within the village of Sulak, unidentified militants attacked and opened fire at a policeman's house with various weapons. It was later reported 1 civilian was apparently wounded in this attack.
- July 10 - In Makhachkala, Dagestan, unidentified militants killed a senior judge for the Untsukulsky District of the republic whilst he was in his car.
- July 11 - In Makhachkala, Dagestan, a bomb explosion occurred in the Akushinsky avenue near the central entrance to a local cemetery. In this bomb blast, it was later reported that 2 policemen had been wounded in this bomb explosion. In Dagestan, an explosive device detonated on the railroad and in the process blew up a passing freight train. In this bomb explosion it was later reported that 16 cars were derailed, of which 13 of them had overturned off the track. No casualties were reportedly sustained in this derailment.
- July 12 - In Khasavyurt, Dagestan, unidentified militants opened fire upon a car, which was carrying the Assistant Prosecutor of the District and his young two-year-old son. In this attack it was reported that 2 people were injured in this attack. Meanwhile, it had been reported that another group of unidentified militants had opened fire upon another car within the area, which housed a Lieutenant Colonel and his wife. In this attack, it was reported that 1 civilian had apparently been injured. In Makhachkala, Dagestan, it was reported that 1 policeman had been killed and that 2 others were apparently injured in a shootout. In Nalchik, Kabardino-Balkaria, unidentified militants attempted to assassinate a regional police chief with an explosive device. Nobody was reportedly injured in this bomb explosion. It was reported that on the same day, another homemade explosive device was found under the same police chief's car. In Makhachkala, Dagestan, a group of up to 8 suspected suicide bombers were detained by law enforcement officers according to the National Anti Terrorism Committee.
- July 13 - In Khasavyurt, Dagestan, unidentified militants opened fire upon a police car with automatic weapons. In this attack it was reported that the police colonel was killed. It is known that 1 civilian was also injured in this militant attack. In Ingushetia, in the village of Ordzhonikidzevskaya within the Sunzhensky district of the republic, it was reported that during a special operation 2 militants were killed and the leader of a militant group was reportedly detained. It is known that 2 policemen were apparently injured in this special operation. Meanwhile, in the neighbouring republic of Chechnya, it was reported that 2 militants had also been killed in a special operation. No law enforcement personnel were reportedly injured or killed in this particular skirmish. In Ingushetia, it was reported that 4 policemen and 1 civilian were wounded after unidentified militants opened fire upon a military convoy with automatic weapons and grenade launchers.
- July 14 - In Makhachkala, Dagestan, unidentified militants opened fire upon a car, killing the head of the village administration. It was reported that 3 other people were apparently injured in this attack.
- July 15 - In Makhachkala, Dagestan, an unidentified militant killed a Christian pastor by the name of Artur Suleimanov. The militant reportedly shot the Suleimanov in the head, supposedly with a handgun and then fled from the scene. In Khasavyurt, Dagestan, it was reported that 2 militants were killed in a special operation conducted by both the security forces of the Interior Ministry in Dagestan and the FSB. In Dagestan, a bomb explosion derailed and damaged locomotive and two freight cars on the Makhachkala-Derbent line. No casualties however were reported, as a result of this derailment.
- July 17 - In Nalchik, Kabardino-Balkaria, a bomb explosion occurred near to a security officer's car. In this car bomb explosion, it was later reported that 5 people were apparently injured.
- July 18 - In the republics of both Dagestan and Kabardino-Balkaria in the North Caucasus, two separate militant attacks occurred. In these two militant attacks, it was reported that 1 police officer was killed and that 3 other police officers were apparently injured. In Kaspiysk, Dagestan, an IED disguised as a pack of juice exploded. It was later reported that 1 civilian was apparently injured in this bomb blast.
- July 19 - In the Sunzhensky district of Ingushetia, unidentified militants opened fire with small arms fire and grenade launchers upon mechanized infantry. No casualties were reportedly sustained in this attack.
- July 21 - In Baksan, Kabardino-Balkaria, unidentified militants launched a bomb and gun attack upon the Baksan hydroelectric power station, causing a fire within the plant's engine room. In this attack, it was later reported that 2 security guards were killed and that at least 2 other people were apparently injured. Meanwhile, within the same town of Baksan, unidentified militants launched an attack upon a police building with a grenade launcher. No casualties were reportedly sustained in this attack.
- July 23 - In Dagestan, unidentified militants detonated an explosive device on a railway track, which apparently destroyed two meters of the track down the line. It is also known that this explosion later delayed the Baku-Kharkiv passenger train. No casaulaties were reportedly sustained in this bombing. In Dagestan, the chief engineer of the hydroelectric power station, which had been attacked two days ago was kidnapped by unidentified militants, according to the local police within the area. In Dagestan, it was reported that 1 police officer was killed and that 1 other police officer was apparently injured after their police car was blown up in a militant attack near to the village of Chontaul.
- July 24 - In Buinaksk, Dagestan, it was reported that 4 Russian soldiers were killed, as a result of two militant attacks on checkpoints within this particular town. The militants apparently used automatic weapons, as well as knives in their attacks upon these two checkpoints. In Grozny, Chechnya, it was reported that 2 Russian soldiers were killed and that 1 other soldier was apparently injured after unidentified militants had apparently opened fire on a group of servicemen guarding a military convoy near to the republic's capital city. In Kabardino-Balkaria, unidentified militants broke into a police investigators house and opened fire upon him and his relatives. It was later reported that 1 police inspector and 1 civilian were apparently wounded in this attack. In Kizlyar, Dagestan, unidentified militants killed the chief administrator for the village of Cherniayevka near to his house, according to the republic's Interior Ministry. These recent militant attacks across the North Caucasus have resulted in the deaths of at least 7 people including 3 senior military officers on this particular day. In Nazran, Ingushetia, an unidentified assailant killed a university official outside his home, in the republic's capital city. It was later reported that the 1 militant and 2 civilians were later killed in a shootout when the police surrounded the perpetrator.
- July 25 - In Nazran, Ingushetia, it was reported that 2 militants were killed in a shootout with police following a wild car chase. It is known that the two perpetrators were then apparently killed in the ensuing shootout with the security forces. In Baksan, Kabardino-Balkaria, it was reported that 2 militants were killed in a special operation. It has also been speculated that these two militants may have been involved in the recent attack upon a hydropower plant within the republic.
- July 26 - In Kaspiysk, Dagestan, unidentified militants killed a police major, who had acted as the local chief of criminal investigation within the area. The attack reportedly occurred as militants opened fire with automatic weapons upon him whilst he was in the courtyard of his own house.
- July 29 - In Kabardino-Balkaria, it was reported that police officers prevented a terrorist attack after they defused an improvised explosive device, which was found in a residential zone of the republic.
- July 30 - In Grozny, Chechnya, it was reported that 6 civilians were apparently injured after an explosive device detonated in the downtown of the city.
- July 31 - In Karabudahkent district of Dagestan, militants attacked a convoy of OMON forces. OMON-1 group was en route into the mountains, when an IED exploded on its way. Then OMOn forces were fired upon with automatic weapons. It is known, that 12 OMON soldiers have been injured in this operation. However MVD claims, that the number of casualties is yet to be announced.

== August ==
- August 1 - In Grozny, Chechnya, it was reported that 2 police officers were killed in a special operation within the republic's capital city of Grozny.
- August 3 - In Baksan, Kabardino-Balkaria, the authorities managed to seize over 100 kg of explosive material, which possibly may have belonged to the militants who were involved in the Baksan hydropower plant attack.
- August 4 - In Dagestan, it was reported that 3 police officers were killed in two separate militant attacks within the two cities of both Khasavyurt and Kizlyar. In Nazran, Ingushetia, it was reported that 1 civilian was killed by militants in a cafe within the city centre. The local police later identified the victim who was killed in this attack.
- August 6 - In Dagestan, it was reported that 6 policemen were injured after a group of 10-13 unidentified militants attacked their Ural Automative Plant military vehicle with automatic weapons and grenade launchers.
- August 8 - In Grozny, Chechnya, it was reported that 1 police officer was killed and that another 2 other police officers were reportedly injured during a special operation within the republic's capital city. It is also known that at least 2 militants were also apparently killed during this security operation.
- August 10 - In the town of Nartkala, within the Urvansky district of Kabardino-Balkaria, it was reported that 2 militants were killed by police forces in a skirmish involving an identity checkup on the outskirts of the town. No police officers were reportedly killed or injured in this particular skirmish.
- August 11 - In Makhachkala, Dagestan, unidentified militants opened fire with automatic weapons upon a private car. In this attack, it is known that 1 civilian was apparently killed and that 1 other civilian was critically injured in this militant attack.
- August 13 - In Ingushetia, it was reported that the local authorities foiled a large-scale terrorist plot within the republic. It is known that this attack was apparently prevented after law enforcement officers engaged 2 militants after halting their car. In this shootout it was later reported that 1 militant was killed and that the other had apparently fled from the scene. The authorities later managed to seize 12 kg of TNT and an automatic weapon from the vehicle. No law enforcement officers were reportedly killed in this skirmish.
- August 15 - In Dagestan, on the railway track from Kaspiysk-Tarki, it was reported that a bomb explosion targeted a freight train. It was later reported that the train did not derail and that nobody was apparently injured in this bomb explosion. In Chechnya, within the Achkhoy-Martan district of the republic, it was reported that 1 militant was killed in a shootout with security forces after they discovered a group of militants in a forested area of this particular district.
- August 16 - In Kaspiysk, Dagestan, it was reported that unidentified militants opened fire with automatic weapons upon a police vehicle. It is known that 1 police officer was apparently injured in this militant attack. In Makhachkala, Dagestan, it was reported that two bomb explosions occurred within the republic's capital city. Nobody was reportedly killed or injured in these blasts however a police car was apparently damaged in these two bombings.
- August 17 - In North Ossetia, a suicide bomber detonated his explosives at a police checkpoint whilst at the border between the North Caucasus regions of both Ingushetia and North Ossetia. It was later reported that at least 2 policemen were killed in this suicide blast and that another 3 others were apparently injured. In Makhachkala, Dagestan, it was reported that 2 militants were killed in a shootout with security forces. It is known that at least 1 policeman and 2 civilians were apparently injured in these particular clashes. In the southern Russian city of Pyatigorsk, it was reported that a car bomb exploded near to a local cafe. It was later reported that at least 30 people were injured in this bomb explosion that had apparently destroyed the cafe and damaged several surrounding vehicles within the area. Militants from the North Caucasus are strong suspects for carrying out this bombing.
- August 19 - In Kabardino-Balkaria, within the Elbrus district near the settlement of Kendelen, it was reported that a group of about 4 unidentified militants opened fire with automatic weapons upon a police officer's car. It was later reported that 1 policeman and 1 civilian were apparently killed in this militant attack.
- August 20 - In Dagestan, it was reported that at least 4 militants were killed by Russian security forces in a shootout between the two forces within the republic.
- August 21 - In Khasavyurt, Dagestan, it was reported that Russian security forces blocked a militant group inside a house. It was later known that at least 5 militants were later killed by the security forces in the storming of this house. One of those killed was later identified as the militant leader, Magomedali Vagabov, who was involved in the recent Moscow Metro bombings, earlier this year. In Tyrnyauz, Kabardino-Balkaria, unidentified militants detonated two explosive devices near a residential area. Nobody was reportedly killed or injured in these two explosions. In Grozny, Chechnya, it was reported that 1 police officer was killed and 6 others were injured in clashes with militants within the city. It was also reported that 1 militant was also apparently killed in this clash with the Russian security forces. In Makhachkala, Dagestan, it was reported that at least 1 police officer and 2 civilians were killed in a series of militant attacks across the republic's capital city. It is also known that 1 other civilian was apparently injured in these militant assaults. In Nazran, Ingushetia, it was reported that sappers neutralised an explosive device, which was positioned near to a Karat market within the republic's capital city.
- August 22 - In Derbent, Dagestan, it was reported that 1 militant was killed after a grenade he had attempted to throw towards police officers detonated prematurely. Meanwhile, within the same republic, it is known that bomb technicians defused an explosive device with the equivalent in 15 kilograms of TNT within the republic. In the Dagestani city of Kaspiysk, it was known that militants hurled a grenade towards police officers. No casualties were reportedly sustained amongst the local police forces.
- August 23 - In Dagestan, near the village of Schauren within the Tsuntinskogo district of the republic, it was reported that 1 police officer and 2 civilians were killed and later beheaded by militants, after militants had apparently ambushed their vehicle. In the Dagestani city of Kizlyar, it was reported that unidentified militants opened fire upon the Deputy Mayor for the city of Kizlyar. It is known that he was seriously injured in this militant attack. Meanwhile, within the village of Gubden in the Karabudakhkensky region within the republic of Dagestan, it was reported that 2 militants were killed after an explosive device, that they were supposedly transporting, detonated within their vehicle. In the village of Pliyevo, which is near to the main city of Nazran in Ingushetia, it was reported that 4 militants were killed in a shootout with Russian security forces. It is also known that at least 2 police officers were apparently injured in this skirmish with the militants. In Dagestan, it was reported that 1 civilian was killed and that another was apparently injured after skirmishes broke out, as a result of political controversies between two groups of villagers within the republic.
- August 24 - In Dagestan, it was reported that 1 civilian was killed and that another was apparently injured after unidentified militants opened fire at their vehicle. It was later known that the driver had died in the attack whilst the passenger was later hospitalised. In the Buinaksk district of Dagestan, it was reported that 2 police officers were injured after unidentified militants in a vehicle, opened fire upon a police cruiser within the republic.
- August 26 - In Khasavyurt, Dagestan, it was report that unidentified militants opened fire with automatic weapons at a police patrol car. It was later reported that 1 police officer was injured in this militant attack. In Dagestan within the Gumbet district, it was reported that a militant opened fire at police from his car. No police officers were reportedly killed or injured in this attack.
- August 27 - In Kabardino-Balkaria, a Russian service officer from the Krasnodar Krai territory was killed along with his wife by unidentified militants whilst they were holiday making in this particular district. Their vehicle was also apparently destroyed in this militant attack. In Khasavyurt Dagestan, it was reported that a roadside bomb explosion targeted a district head for the republic. It is known that 3 police officers were injured in this bomb explosion who were in the motorized escort, however the district head himself escaped unharmed from this bombing.
- August 29 - In Chechnya, within the village of Tsentoroi, it was reported that at least 12 militants were killed after they launched an attack upon the native village of Ramzan Kadyrov. It is known that at least 6 police officers were killed and 17 other police officers were apparently injured in this militant attack. There is some dispute over civilian casualties with initial reports claiming that 5 civilians were reportedly killed however later reports only reported that 7 civilians had apparently been injured in this militant assault. In Dagestan, it was reported that at least 4 militants and 1 police officer were killed in a shoot-out between militants and Russian security forces within the republic. In Nazran, Ingushetia, unidentified militants in a car, opened fire at local police officers. It was later reported that 1 civilian was injured in this militant attack. In Kabardino-Balkaria, within the Elbrus area of the republic, it was reported that a police patrol vehicle struck an IED. It was later reported that 2 police officers and 1 civilian were injured in this militant attack.
- August 30 - In Dagestan, within the settlement of Khiv, unidentified militants opened fire upon a police post, which was positioned outside an administrative building within the republic. It was later reported that 2 police officers were killed and 1 police officer was apparently injured in this militant attack. Meanwhile, in the town of Khasavyurt within the same republic, it was reported that 2 militants were killed in a special operation, which was conducted by forces of both the FSB and the local police.
- August 31 - In Kabardino-Balkaria, within the Urvanskogo region, it was reported that 1 militant was killed and 2 police officers were apparently injured in a shootout within the republic.

== September ==
- September 1 - In Makhachkala, Dagestan, it was reported that 1 militant was killed by police forces within the republic after he reportedly resisted arrest by opening fire at them. He was then killed by the police in the return-fire. Meanwhile, within the same city, it was reported that unidentified militants opened fire with automatic weapons at a law enforcement officer outside his house. It is known that 1 police officer of the special forces was reportedly killed in this militant attack.
- September 2 - In Ingushetia, within the Sunzhensky district, it was reported that 1 police officer was killed after unidentified militants attacked his house with automatic weapons. It is known that 1 civilian was also apparently injured in this militant attack.
- September 3 - In Kizlyar, Dagestan, a bomb exploded near to a kindergarten within the local area. Nobody was reportedly injured or killed in this particular bomb explosion.
- September 4 - In Dagestan, it was reported that unidentified militants detonated an explosive device under a senior official's car within the republic. It was later reported that the senior official, as well as two of his own bodyguards were apparently injured in this IED attack. His driver however was reportedly killed in this bomb explosion.
- September 5 - In Buinaksk, Dagestan, it was reported that a suicide car bomber rammed his explosive-laden vehicle into the tents of a temporary military camp. It is known that at least 5 Russian soldiers were killed in this suicide attack and more than 40 others were apparently injured. Several tents and a military vehicle were destroyed. A second bomb blast later occurred, as investigators were making their way to the site of the first suicide blast, however nobody was reportedly injured in this second bomb explosion. In Nalchik, Kabardino-Balkaria, unidentified militants opened fire with automatic weapons upon a group of law enforcement officers. It was later reported that 1 police officer was killed in this militant attack.
- September 6 - In Makhachkala, Dagestan, a car bomb exploded within the centre of the republic's capital city. It was later reported that 1 police officer and 1 civilian were reportedly injured in this bomb explosion. Meanwhile, on the outskirts of the city, in the village of Samandar, it was reported that 1 suspected militant was killed and another was apparently injured after an explosive device detonated within their apartment, the local authorities later discovered at the scene of this bomb explosion.
- September 7 - In Dagestan, it was reported that bomb explosion derailed a freight train, which consisted of literally the first section of the locomotive and five cars of the train, of which two apparently overturned. The authorities did not specify the number of casualties, which were sustained in this derailment. In Chechnya, it was reported that unidentified militants ambushed and opened fire upon a Mil Mi-8 Russian military helicopter, in the Urus-Martan district of the republic. It was later reported that 1 Russian soldier, who had acted as the gunner on this military helicopter was reportedly injured in this militant attack.
- September 8 - In Baksan, Kabardino-Balkaria, it was reported that unidentified militants opened fire with automatic weapons, killing a federal judge at the entrance to his own home within the republic. In the centre of Nazran, Ingushetia, unidentified militants opened fire with a grenade launcher several times at an FSB border guard post. The certain details concerning the casualties were not specified by the local authorities.
- September 9 - In Vladikavkaz, North Ossetia, a suicide car bombing killed at least 17 people and injured more than 130 others, in a market square within the centre of the city. No group has of yet claimed responsibility for this latest suicide attack although the Caucasus Emirate are strong suspects for this particular suicide attack.
- September 10 - In Dagestan, within the Kizilyurtovsky district, it is known that unidentified militants opened fire upon a police officer. It was later reported that 1 police officer was killed in this militant attack. In Dagestan, it was reported that 4 militants were killed in a special operation conducted by police forces within the republic. It was later reported that 3 police officers were killed and 1 other was apparently injured whilst conducting this special operation. Meanwhile, within the same republic's capital city of Makhachkala, unidentified militants killed a law enforcement colonel, as he waiting outside a store. His wife was apparently injured in this militant assault.
- September 11 - In Derbent, Dagestan, it was reported that 1 militant was killed in a police operation within this major city of the republic. No police casualties were reportedly sustained in this special operation. In Kabardino-Balkaria, unidentified militants detonated an IED next to a military armoured vehicle. It was later reported that 5 police officers were injured in this militant bombing. In Ingushetia, it was reported that unidentified militants killed 1 police officer in a drive-by shooting within the republic.
- September 12 - In Makhachkala, Dagestan, unidentified militants opened fire upon a police officer's car within the republic's capital city. It was later reported that 1 police officer was killed in this militant attack. This police officer had reportedly acted as the head of the anti-extremism department for this particular district. In Makhachkala, it was reported that 1 police officer was injured after an IED exploded under the police officer's car.
- September 13 - In Dagestan, it was later reported that at least 13 militants and 3 police officers were killed in a series of special operations conducted across the republic over the previous days. It is known that at least 10 militants were apparently killed in the republic's capital city of Makhachkala whilst another 3 militants were shot dead by Russian security forces within the village of Komsomolskoye, in the Kizilyurt district of the republic.
- September 14 - In Chechnya within the Shatoi region of the Nokhch-Keloi settlement, it was reported that 1 police officer was killed and another was apparently injured after unidentified militants opened fire upon them, whilst resisting detainment. In Kizilyurt, Dagestan, it is known that unidentified militants detonated an explosive device in a police officer's car. It was later reported that 1 police officer was apparently injured in this bomb explosion. In Nazran, Ingushetia, it was reported that a local Muslim cleric was severely injured after an assassination attempt within the republic's largest city. It was later known that a bomb had detonated beneath the cleric's car and that he was currently in a very serious condition, as doctors are fighting for his life.
- September 15 - In Grozny, Chechnya, it was reported that 2 militants were killed by police security forces within the republic's capital city. No casualties however were reported amongst the police forces who had been involved in this particular shootout.
- September 16 - In Chechnya within the Shalinsky district, it was reported that 1 police officer was killed by unidentified militants and left for dead, bearing gunshot wounds, within the trunk of a vehicle. The militants reportedly managed to seize his weapons.
- September 17 - In Kaspiysk, Dagestan, it was reported that 1 police officer was killed after he was ambushed and shot dead by unidentified militants whilst coming out of a local hall. In Dagestan, it was reported that 5 militants were killed after Russian security forces conducted a special operation whilst raiding a militant camp within the republic.
- September 19 - In Dagestan, it was reported that 1 militant was killed in a special security operation, in the village of Echeda within the Tsumadin district of the republic. No security personnel were reportedly killed or injured whilst conducting this special operation. In Chechnya, it was reported that 3 police officers were injured, after they were targeted by a bomb explosion within the village of Agishty, which is located within the Shali district of the republic.
- September 20 - In Nalchik, Kabardino-Balkaria, a roadside bomb targeted a police patrol vehicle, which was housing four police officers. However it was later reported that only 1 police officer, as well as another 3 civilians were apparently injured in this militant bombing.
- September 21 - In Nalchik, Kabardino-Balkaria, it was reported that unidentified militants opened fire upon a police officer, as he was getting into his vehicle. It was later reported that 1 police officer was injured in this militant attack. In Dagestan, it was reported that two assassination attempts occurred within both the two towns of Kaspiysk and Kizilyurt. It was later reported that only 1 police officer was injured in both of these two assassination attempts.
- September 23 - In Dagestan, it was reported that 2 police officers were killed in a so-called friendly fire incident within the republic. The incident reportedly occurred, as they apparently did not comply to carry out an identity check, to which then they were killed as a shootout, which followed between the two police groups at the scene.
- September 24 - In Makhachkala, Dagestan, it was reported that 2 police officers were killed and 44 others were apparently injured after a suicide bomber detonated his explosives after approaching police officer's near a police cordon, which was blocking off the site of an ongoing special operation within the day. In Makhachkala, Dagestan, it was reported that 2 militants were killed and 1 other was detained during a special operation within the city. In the Kizilyurt district of Dagestan, it was reported that 5 militants, including a woman, were killed during a special operation within this district of the republic. In Nartkala, Kabardino-Balkaria, it was reported that 1 militant was killed after he attacked an FSB district department building and then proceeded to detonated a mine strapped to himself within the town.
- September 25 - In Makhachkala, Dagestan, it was reported that at least 4 militants and 2 police officers are reportedly now known to have been killed in a special operation within the republic's capital city.
- September 26 - In the settlement of Yandare, Ingushetia, it was reported that unidentified militants opened fire upon a police post with automatic weapons. It was later reported that 1 police officer was killed and another was apparently injured in this militant attack.
- September 27 - In the Karabakh region of Dagestan, unidentified militants opened fire with automatic weapons upon a police officer and his family, as they came out of their house. It was later reported that 1 police officer and his 1 civilian were killed in this militant attack. His wife was apparently injured. In Nazran, Ingushetia, it was reported that unidentified militants attacked a traffic police post, killing 1 police officer and injuring another.
- September 28 - In Izberbash, Dagestan, it was reported that 4 police officers were killed, including the chief of the extremism control department, after unidentified militants ambushed them with automatic weapons within a local cafe. In Nazran, Kabardino-Balkaria, unidentified militants opened fire upon a unit of Russian border guards using automatic weapons and grenade launchers. No casualties however were actually specified by the local authorities.
- September 29 - In Dagestan, it was reported that 14 militants were killed in two separate special operations. It was later reported that 9 militants were apparently killed by security forces within the town of Kaspiysk whereas another 5 militants were killed within the republic's capital city of Makhachkala. In Dagestan, it was later reported that as a result of the success of this particular operation, it is known that two major terrorist attacks were prevented within the republic.
- September 30 - In Tyrnyauz, Kabardino-Balkaria, it was reported that 2 police officers were killed after unidentified militants opened fire upon them with automatic weapons. It was later reported that a female employee was apparently amongst those killed in this militant attack. In Kaspiysk, Dagestan, it was reported that 17 police officers were injured after an explosive device detonated on a highway where police officers were stationed. It was later reported that injuries were mainly by splinters and that the lives of the police officers were not in any danger from this militant attack. In Stavropol, Southern Russia, it was reported that two large bombs of around 60 kg of TNT were defused within the city centre. It was later known that a civilian's dead body was reportedly found within the car that had been primed as a car bomb at the scene of these attempted militant bombings.

== October ==
- October 1 - In Makhachkala, Dagestan, it was reported that 1 militant was killed by Russian security forces in a special operation within the republic's capital city.
- October 2 - In Makhachkala, Dagestan, it was apparently reported that a special operation had commenced after Russian security forces blocked a militant inside a building within the republic's capital city. It was later known that 1 militant was apparently killed in this special operation.
- October 3 - In Makhachkala, Dagestan, it is now known that 5 militants, including two women, were killed in two ongoing operations within the republic's capital city. Meanwhile, within the same city, it was later reported unidentified militants opened fire with automatic weapons upon a police officer's car. It is known that 1 police officer was apparently killed in this militant attack.
- October 4 - In the village of Nizhni Chirurt, which is located within northern Dagestan, it was reported that unidentified militants stormed into an office and killed the administration head for the village, as well as a collective farm chairman after shooting them dead at gunpoint. They had apparently held the visitors to this office at gunpoint before they fled from the scene of their militant attack.
- October 5 - In Makhachkala, Dagestan, it was reported that 1 militant was killed in a special operation, who had reportedly been wanted by the local authorities for killing police force personnel within the republic. It is known that the militant had apparently died after his suicide-bomb belt detonated after being shot by Russian security forces.
- October 6 - In Makhachkala, Dagestan, it was reported that 2 female accomplices of a killed militant, were detained in the republic's capital city. It is also known that Russian special forces reportedly managed to seize various kinds of weaponry and ammunition from the scene of this special operation.
- October 10 - In Baksan, Kabardino-Balkaria, unidentified militants killed a staff member of the Criminal Justice Board of the Kabardino-Balkaria Supreme Court, Azret-Ali Sidakov, as he was leaving his friends wedding. It is known that he later died whilst on the way to the local hospital.
- October 11 - In Chegem, Kabardino-Balkaria, it was reported that a military vehicle struck an IED within the Chegem region of the republic. It was later reported that 3 Russian soldiers were injured in this militant bombing.
- October 12 - It has been reported that Russian police forces have apparently detained 3 militants, who are believed to have been involved in the 2010 Vladikavkaz bombing, which occurred in early September of this year.
- October 14 - In Dagestan within the Tsumadinsky district, it was reported that unidentified militants killed 3 police officers and injured 1 other in a shootout, as police forces conducted a special operation within the republic. The perpetrators later fled from the scene of this militant attack.
- October 15 - In Derbent, Dagestan, it was reported that 1 militant was killed in a special operation, which had been conducted by Russian security forces within the republic.
- October 17 - In Grozny, Chechnya, it was reported that 2 police officers were killed in a drive-by shooting involving unidentified militants, near a food market within the republic's capital city.
- October 18 - In Grozny, Chechnya, unidentified militants injured a co-worker of a non-governmental organization Human Rights Center and her daughter, after 4 unidentified assailants stormed their apartment and severely beat them in their own home.
- October 19 - In Grozny, Chechnya, an attack upon the Chechen Parliament Building, in the centre of the republic's capital city of Grozny by unidentified militants, leaves 6 people dead and 17 others injured. Those killed in this audacious militant attack, were later reported to have consisted of 2 police officers, a parliamentary administrative manager and 3 militants. In Nalchik, Kabardino-Balkaria, a terrorist attack was averted, as police defused an explosive device within a market in the republic's capital city. It was reported that a homemade radio-controlled explosive device filled with bolts was apparently later defused by specialists within the local area.
- October 20 - In Malgobek, Ingushetia, unidentified militants opened fire at point-blank range and killed 1 police officer of the Malgobek city police department. The police officer later died in hospital from the injuries that he had sustained in this militant attack.
- October 21 - In Tyrnyauz, Kabardino-Balkaria, it was reported that 3 militants were killed in a skirmish between militants and police forces within the city. It was also reported that 1 police officer was killed and another injured in the ongoing operation. An operation was later launched against a mine within the republic, in which they were reportedly hiding in, and an active phase of a military operation is currently ongoing for the second such day in the city.
- October 23 - In Tyrnyauz, Kabardino-Balkaria, the Russian special forces in their ongoing operation at a mine within the republic's city, discovered weaponry, ammunition and a truck with an explosive device stored within the vehicle. It is known that 2 militants were apparently detained in security sweep operations within the local area. In the Kizilyurt district of Dagestan, it was reported that 1 militant was killed and 2 police officers were injured during a shootout within this particular district of the republic. In Khasavyurt, Dagestan, it was reported that a suicide bomb attack killed 1 police officer and injured 12 others. It was later known that this suicide bomb explosion occurred near to the administrative building of the local police forces within the area. Russian security forces reported that a total of 4 militants were killed in two separate shoot-outs across the republics of both Dagestan and Ingushetia, which is located across Russia's North Caucasus region.
- October 24 - In Ingushetia within the village of Ordzhonikidzevskaya, it was reported that a self-made explosive device detonated near to a police vehicle. It was later known that 5 people, including 4 police officers and 1 civilian were injured in this militant bombing.
- October 26 - In Grozny, Chechnya, it is known that police forces defused an IED, with an explosive capacity of up to 6 kg of TNT, chipped with iron rods and screws for shrapnel. The bomb had apparently been placed outside a concert hall, which had previously been targeted by a suicide bomber earlier this year, a police spokesman has claimed.
- October 27 - In Makhachkala, Dagestan, it was reported that specialist police units defused a radio-controlled IED, with an explosive capacity of up to 6 kg of TNT, which had been filled with destructive agents such as bolts, nuts and brick fragments. The Russian security forces operational headquarters in Dagestan, later claimed that they had prevented a high-profile terrorist attack within the republic's capital city.
- October 28 - In Chechnya within the town of Achkhoy-Martan, it was reported that 1 militant was killed, after he reportedly opened fire upon a vehicle housing three police officers. However he was then killed in the retaliatory gunfire from the police forces.

== November ==
- November 1 - In Grozny, Chechnya, it was reported that 1 militant was killed and 10 police officers injured, one critically, after a militant blew himself up with a home-made grenade, during a special forces raid on a suspected militant hideout within the republic's capital city.
- November 2 - In Khasavyurt, Dagestan, it was reported that an Imam for a local mosque within the area was killed by unidentified militants, after the opened fire upon him, hitting the Imam in the head. He later died of his injuries whilst on the way to the local hospital. It was later reported that 2 security guards were killed and 5 others were apparently injured in this accident. In Kaspiysk, Dagestan, it was reported that 1 militant was killed and 1 police officer injured in a document-check skirmish within this particular town of the republic.
- November 3 - In Nalchik, Kabardino-Balkaria, it was reported that the commercial director of the Elbrus region cable roads, Yusup Taukenov, was killed by unidentified militants. He reportedly died from his injuries at the scene of this militant attack. In Baksan, Kabardino-Balkaria, it was reported that 1 civilian was severely injured, after an IED detonated near to a military vehicle carrying Russian OMON officers within the town.
- November 4 - In Grozny, Chechnya, it was reported that 1 militant was killed and 2 police officers injured in a clash between the two forces, as the authorities were attempting to detain the suspected militant. In Tyrnyauz, Kabardino-Balkaria, it is known that 2 militants were killed in the ongoing security operation at an abandoned mine within the city. No law enforcement personnel were reportedly injured or killed in this special operation.
- November 5 - In the town of Izberbash, Dagestan, it was reported that 1 Russian soldier was killed and 3 others injured in clashes with unidentified militants in a wooded area of the republic. The operation is still proceeding and it is believed that 8-10 militants are still resisting law-enforcement officers and security forces within this wooded area.
- November 6 - In the Kayakenskom region of Dagestan, it was reported that 1 Russian soldier was killed and 6 others injured in a grenade attack upon their military vehicle. In Buinaksk, Dagestan, an IED detonated near to the gate of a house, which is home to the Chairman of the Accounting Chamber, Buinaksk Aseev. Nobody was apparently injured in this bomb explosion.
- November 9 - In Khasavyurt, Dagestan, it is known that the local authorities prevented a large-scale terrorist attack after they defused a 70 kg car bomb, which had been planned to have been detonated on one of the upcoming holidays. It is known that the area was cordoned off and residents of nearby house evacuated, as bomb specialists of the FSB defused this large car bomb.
- November 10 - In Kizlyar, Dagestan, unidentified militants launched an audacious armed militant attack against police officers, after bearing down heavy automatic weapon fire upon them, as they were making routine searches of vehicles. It is known that at least 1 police officer was killed and 6 others, including 5 police officers and 1 civilian were injured. Meanwhile, within the Karabudakhkent district of Dagestan, unidentified militants detonated an IED near to a column of internal troops. It is known that 1 Russian soldier was injured in this militant roadside bombing. In the Urus-Martan district of Chechnya, it was reported that 1 Russian soldier was killed in an IED explosion, during a reconnaissance and search operation within a mountain-wooded area of this district. It is known that the soldier later died of his injuries whilst on the way to hospital.
- November 11 - In Makhachkala, Dagestan, it is known that 11 people, including at least 7 police officers and 4 militants were killed in a shooting rampage within the republic's capital city. It was later reported that unidentified militants hijacked a police patrol car and had opened fire upon police forces who were on duty in two different areas of the city. It was reported that at least 3 civilians and 2 police officers were also apparently injured in this militant attack. Russian police forces then followed and blocked their vehicle, to which there was another shoot-out, in which the vehicle ignited and later exploded in the resultant shooting.
- November 12 - In the Lak district of Dagestan, it was reported that unidentified militants opened fire upon a police patrol unit within the district. No casualties were reported in this militant attack. In Makhachkala, Dagestan, it was reported that several central neighbourhoods were cordoned and sealed off, presumably in the stages of a special operation upon a blocked house. However it is known that security forces personnel later retreated from the area. No other details were provided on this incident.
- November 13 - In Buynaksk, Dagestan, it was reported that 3 militants were killed in a special operation, which was launched by law enforcement officers upon their blocked house. No law enforcement casualties were specified in this special operation.
- November 14 - It was reported that a militant warlord of an armed gang and a mastermind of various terrorist attacks, including a suicide car bombing, was apparently identified amongst those killed in a special security forces operation on the previous day, in the town of Buynaksk, which is located within the republic of Dagestan.
- November 15 - In Khasavyurt, Dagestan, an unidentified militant stormed into a hospital and killed 1 police officer who was undergoing treatment at the hospital. The perpetrator later fled from the scene of this militant attack. In Makhachkala, Dagestan, it was reported that a powerful explosive device was defused on a street within the republic's capital city. Meanwhile, within the same city, an IED detonated under a police officer's vehicle. No casualties however were reported in this militant bombing. In the republic of Chechnya, it was reported that 1 police officer was killed by unidentified militants who had apparently opened fire at his roadside traffic post within the republic.
- November 17 - In Vladikavkaz, North Ossetia, unidentified militants killed a prominent businessman within the republic's capital city. He was apparently targeted as he left his house and was shot dead near the central department store within the city centre.
- November 18 - In Nazran, Ingushetia, it was reported that 3 militants were killed in a special operation in the Barsuki settlement of the republic's district. It is known that the militants had opened fire, as police officers attempted to stop their vehicle however they were then killed in the return-fire from the security forces. In Dagestan, within Khasavyurt and Makhachkala, it was reported that at least 4 police officers were injured, one seriously, in two separate militant attacks, which targeted police officers within this republic. In Ingushetia, a suspected militant who was believed to have masterminded the Vladikavkaz suicide car bombing was detained by security forces within the republic. No security forces personnel were reportedly injured in his detainment. It was also later revealed that this suspected militant Warlord, Yusup Dzangiyev, was reportedly planning and masterminding another such similar terrorist attack, according to a spokesman for the Investigation Committee. In Pyatigorsk, it was announced by Russian Interior Minister, Rashid Nurgaliyev that the republics of both Dagestan and Kabardino-Balkaria reportedly have the highest level of terrorist threat within the North Caucasus region.
- November 19 - In Dagestan within the Hunzah district, unidentified militants killed 1 police officer and injured 2 others, after they attacked the building of the frontier district department of internal affairs with rocket-propelled grenades and small-arms fire. It was initially reported that 3 police officers were injured in this militant attack however one later apparently died of his injuries at hospital. In Makhachkala, Dagestan, it was reported that 1 police major and 2 sergeants were apparently detained for taking a bribe of 75,000 rubles within the republic's capital city. In Kaspiysk, Dagestan, it was reported that two 1 kg bombs were disarmed, after a tenant informed the police about a suspicious plastic bag with wires sticking out of the device.
- November 20 - In Baksan, Kabardino-Balkaria, unidentified militants killed an FSB officer, as he was returning home from work. The law enforcement officer reportedly died from his injuries at the scene of this militant attack. In Derbent, Dagestan, it was reported that 1 civilian was killed and 2 others injured in a conflict that arose between commercial banks and their customers within this particular town of the republic.
- November 21 - In the Krasnodar region of southern Russia, a 1 kg explosive device detonated at a railway station damaging rail line and disrupting train communication within the area. Although there were no reported casualties, this bomb attack comes amid security fears about the security situation for the Winter Olympics, which are expected to take place in 2014 within the nearby southern Russian city of Sochi.
- November 22 - In Kabardino-Balkaria within the Kenzhe settlement, it was reported that 1 police officer was killed, after unidentified militants attacked a police outpost. The militants apparently managed to seize the officer's service weapons. In the village of Ordzhonikidzevskaya, Ingushetia, unidentified militants launched a rocket-propelled grenade at a church. No casualties were reported although the roof of the building suffered from some minor damage in this militant attack. In the Karabudakhkent settlement of Dagestan, it was reported that an FSB officer was killed after an explosive device detonated on the bottom of his car. He was apparently gravely injured at the scene of this militant bombing however he then later succumbed to his injuries at hospital. In Nazran, Ingushetia, it was reported that unidentified militants opened fire with automatic weapons on the vehicle owned by the editor of a leading newspaper within the republic. It is known that the journalist was moderately injured in this militant attack.
- November 24 - In Khasavyurt, Dagestan, unidentified militants detonated a 5 kg explosive device near the gates of the house, of a deputy prosecutor within the local area. It is known that the deputy prosecutor survived the assassination attempt and only minor damaged was inflicted on the surrounding area. In Nazran, Ingushetia, it was reported that 1 civilian was injured, after an improvised explosive device detonated inside a summer house under construction near the city.
- November 25 - In Nazran, Ingushetia, it was reported that 2 militants were killed by Russian security forces, after militants initially opened fire upon security forces within a wooded area of the republic. However the militants were then reportedly killed in the retaliatory gunfire.
- November 26 - In Nalchik, Kabardino-Balkaria, a powerful explosive device planted under a manhole cover detonated near to a police vehicle, as it was passing-by within the city. No casualties were reportedly sustained in this bombing, according to local officials.
- November 27 - In Kizlyar, Dagestan, it was reported that 1 Russian soldier was killed, after unidentified militants detonated an explosive device on the rail-line tracks and opened fire upon security forces within the area. The soldier was reportedly injured at the scene however he later succumbed to his injuries at hospital. In Khasavyurt, Dagestan, it was reported that 1 police officer was killed by unidentified militants, after they opened fire upon his vehicle. It is known that he later died of his injuries at hospital.
- November 28 - In Kizlyar, Dagestan, it was reported that 2 militants were killed in a police operation within this particular district of the republic. A counter-terrorist operation regime was announced, which still continues within the local area. In Nalchik, Kabardino-Balkaria, it was reported that 1 police officer was killed, after unidentified militants opened fire upon his vehicle. It is known that the police inspector died of his injuries, at the scene of this militant attack.

== December ==
- December 5 - In Kizilyurt, Dagestan, it was reported that at least 1 police officer and 6 militants, including a militant leader were killed in a special operation within the republic. It is known that the anti-terrorist operation occurred, after Russian security forces blocked a group of militants inside one of the buildings within this particular district of the republic.
- December 6 - In Khasavyurt, Dagestan, it was reported that at least 1 police officer was killed, after unidentified militants opened fire upon him within a cafe in the city centre. The police officer later died of his injuries whilst on the way to hospital.
- December 11 - In Buinaksk, Dagestan, it was reported that at least 3 militants, including a militant leader were killed in a special operation with the republic. The active phase of the special operation is now complete and details concerning security forces casualties were not specified by the local authorities within the area.
- December 15 - In Nalchik, Kabardino-Balkaria, it was reported that unidentified militants ambushed and killed a moderate mufti cleric near his house within the republic's capital city. The cleric reportedly died of his injuries at the scene of this militant attack.
- December 16 - In Derbent, Dagestan, it is known that an explosive device derailed a freight train and a locomotive within this particular town of the republic. No casualties were apparently reported, although the locomotive of this train was apparently damaged in the explosion.
- December 18 - In Baksan, Kabardino-Balkaria, it was reported that 7 civilian hunters were killed and 1 taken hostage by unidentified militants near to this particular city. It is known that their bodies were apparently discovered in a trench and the fatalities are known to include those from this particular republic, as well as some from the Stavropol Region of southern Russia.
- December 20 - In Makhachkala, Dagestan, it was reported that 2 civilians were injured in a bomb explosion, with the device apparently hidden in a waste bin, within the republic's capital city. It is known that both of the injured were hospitalised and an investigation is under way into this militant bombing.
- December 22 - In Nalchik, Kabardino-Balkaria, it was reported that Russian security forces detained a senior militant leader within the republic's capital city. The militant apparently put up armed resistance in his capture, although he was the only injured person.
- December 23 - In Nalchik, Kabardino-Balkaria, it was reported that 1 police officer and 1 civilian were injured in a bomb explosion, with the explosive device reportedly hidden under a street bench within the republic's capital city. It is known that their injuries were not known to be life-threatening and an investigation has apparently been launched into this militant bombing. In Makhachkala, Dagestan, it was reported that 6 police officers were injured, as a result of two separate explosions within the republic's capital city. It was also reported that three officers had reportedly received minor injuries, whereas the remaining three were hospitalised for more serious injuries. An investigation was later launched into these two militant bombings. Also 2 police officers were shot and killed in the village of Shalushka, near Nalchik. unidentified militants also captured their weapons and fled the scene.
- December 24 - In Makhachkala, Dagestan, it was reported that 1 police officer was killed after unidentified militants opened fire upon his police patrol vehicle. It was known however that two assailants were later detained, although the police officer later died of his injuries sustained in this militant attack. In Baksan, Kabardino-Balkaria, it was reported that 1 civilian hunter was killed, after Russian security forces discovered another body near a vehicle rigged with an explosive device. It was later known that this IED exploded shortly after its discovery, to which 1 police officer was injured in the militant bombing.
- December 25 - In Nazran, Ingushetia, it was reported that a bomb explosion occurred at a bus stop within the republic's capital city, after unidentified militants dropped an IED off at this particular location. No casualties however were reported in this militant bombing.
- December 26 - In Makhachkala, Dagestan, it was reported that at least 8 militants were killed, including a senior militant emir for the district, during a special Spetsnaz operation against militants in an apartment, which was conducted within the republic's capital city. As many as six IEDS were apparently seized at the scene of this special operation. No security forces personnel casualties however were reportedly specified by the local authorities.
- December 27 - In Nalchik, Kabardino-Balkaria, it was reported that 1 militant was killed and another injured, after an IED exploded, which was apparently being kept inside the militants apartment. It is known that initial reports had claimed that only two people were injured, however one militant later succumbed to his injuries. The other injured militant reportedly survived from his injuries and was later detained by the local authorities.
- December 29 - In Nalchik, Kabardino-Balkaria, it was reported that unidentified militants killed a famous ethnographer or scientist of philology at his home, which was located on the suburbs of the republic's capital city. The ethnographer reportedly died of his injuries at the scene of this militant attack.
- December 30 - In Makhachkala, Dagestan, it was reported that at least 1 militant was killed, after security forces blocked a group of militants inside a house in the republic's capital city. It is known that three bombs each weighing some 15 kg were defused by police specialists, which were found inside the house that were discovered at the scene of these militant clashes.

== See also ==
- List of clashes in the North Caucasus in 2009
- List of clashes in the North Caucasus in 2011
- List of clashes in the North Caucasus in 2012
- List of clashes in the North Caucasus in 2014
- List of clashes in the North Caucasus in 2015
- List of clashes in the North Caucasus in 2016
- List of clashes in the North Caucasus in 2017
- List of clashes in the North Caucasus in 2018
- List of clashes in the North Caucasus in 2019
