= Stalskoye =

Stalskoye Стальское СтІалиб Гёк-Тёбе
- Selo
- Location within Republic of Dagestan Location within Russia
- Coordinates: 43°11′N 46°58′E
- Country: Russia
- Region: Republic of Dagestan
- District: Kizilyurtovsky District
- Time zone: UTC+3:00

Stalskoye (Russian: Стальское; Avar: СтІалиб; Kumyk: Гёк-Тёбе, Gök-Töbe) is a rural locality (a selo) and the administrative centre of Stalsky Selsoviet, Kizilyurtovsky District, Republic of Dagestan, Russia. The population was 5,729 as of 2010. There are 63 streets.

== Nationalities ==
Avars, Kumyks, Laks, Lezgins and Dargins live there.

== Geography ==
Stalskoye is located 114 km south of Kizlyar (the district's administrative centre) by road. Shushanovka and Kulzeb are the nearest rural localities.
