= Nechayevka, Republic of Dagestan =

Nechayevka Нечаевка НичІаб
- Selo
- Location within Republic of Dagestan Location within Russia
- Coordinates: 43°16′N 46°55′E
- Country: Russia
- Region: Republic of Dagestan
- District: Kizilyurtovsky District
- Time zone: UTC+3:00

Nechayevka (Russian: Нечаевка; Avar: НичІаб) is a rural locality (a selo) and the administrative centre of Nechayevsky Selsoviet, Kizilyurtovsky District, Republic of Dagestan, Russia. The population was 4,779 as of 2010. There are 86 streets.

== Geography ==
Nechayevka is located 9 km northeast of Kizilyurt (the district's administrative centre) by road, on the right bank of the Sulak River. Matseyevka and Akhtini are the nearest rural localities.

== Nationalities ==
Avars live there.
