= Sulak, Russia =

Sulak (Russian: Сулак) is the name of several inhabited localities in Russia.

- Sulak, Republic of Dagestan, urban-type settlement in Dagestan
- Sulak, Penza Oblast, village in Volchkovsky Selsoviet of Belinsky District in Penza Oblast
- Sulak, Saratov Oblast, village in Krasnopartizansky District of Saratov Oblast
- Sulak, Tambov Oblast, village in Sulaksky Selsoviet of Umyotsky District in Tambov Oblast

== See also ==
- Novy Sulak, urban-type settlement in the Republic of Dagestan, Russia
