= Sulaj =

Sulaj is an Albanian surname. Notable people with it include:

- Agim Sulaj (born 1960), Italo-Albanian painter
- Agron Sulaj (1952–1996), Albanian footballer and coach

== See also ==
- Sulak (disambiguation)
