= 1999 Vladikavkaz bombing =

- Location: 43°00′58″N 44°39′00″E; Vladikavkaz, North Ossetia–Alania
- Date: 19 March 1999 (UTC+3)
- Attack type: Bombing
- Deaths: 52
- Injuries: 168
- Perpetrators: Adam Tsurov; Abdulrakhim Khutiyev; Makhmud Temirbiyev; Umar Khaniyev

The 1999 Vladikavkaz bombing took place in a crowded market in Vladikavkaz, North Ossetia–Alania, Russia on 19 March 1999, killing 52 and injuring 168.

The bombers were tried and convicted on 15 December 2003. The court also convicted the men of the bombing of a military housing unit known as "Sputnik" on 18 May 1999 that left four dead and 17 injured and a Vladikavkaz train station on 28 June 1999, which injured 18 people. In addition, the court found the men guilty in the kidnapping of four Russian officers and taking them to Chechnya for ransom on 30 July 1999. The officers were later released.

== Aftermath ==
On 21 March 1999, a day of national mourning was declared in Russia for the victims, as a fire had occurred the previous day at a psychiatric hospital in Vologda Oblast.

As a result of the terrorist attack, the football match between the national teams of Russia and Andorra was moved from Vladikavkaz to Moscow at the request of the Andorran side[3]. The incident also affected the match schedule of Vladikavkaz's football club Alania in the Russian Championship, prompting increased security measures ahead of their first-round match against Spartak Moscow.

On 15 December 2003, the Supreme Court of North Ossetia delivered its verdict in the terrorism case. Adam Tsurov was sentenced to life imprisonment in a high-security penal colony, while Makhmud Temirbiyev and Abdurakhman Khutiev were each sentenced to 23 years in prison. Tsurov is currently serving his sentence in the "White Swan" prison in Perm Krai.

Magomed Tsakiyev did not live to hear his verdict — by that time, the terrorist had been killed in an armed clash.

== See also ==
- List of terrorist incidents, 1999
- 2008 Vladikavkaz bombing
- 2010 Vladikavkaz bombing
