= 2008 Vladikavkaz bombing =

Chechen suicide bombing in North Ossetia

Coordinates: 43.016°N 44.65°E

- Location: Vladikavkaz, North Ossetia, Russia
- Date: 6 November 2008
- Attack type: Suicide bombing
- Weapon: Explosive belt
- Deaths: 12
- Injuries: 41
- Perpetrator: Caucasus Emirate

The 2008 Vladikavkaz bombing took place on a routed taxicab, which was unloading passengers at a market in Vladikavkaz, North Ossetia, Russia on 6 November 2008, killing 12 and injuring 41. The bombing was committed by a female suicide bomber. On 15 November the attack was claimed by the Riyad-us Saliheen Brigade of Martyrs, a unit of the militant Caucasus Emirate group.

== See also ==
- List of terrorist incidents in 2008
- 1999 Vladikavkaz bombing
- 2010 Vladikavkaz bombing
