= Novy Kyakhulay =

Novy Kyakhulay Новый Кяхулай
- Urban-type settlement
- Interactive map of Novy Kyakhulay
- Location of Novy Kyakhulay Novy Kyakhulay (Republic of Dagestan)
- Coordinates: 42°57′N 47°32′E
- Country: Russia
- Federal subject: Dagestan
- Administrative district: Leninsky City District
- Founded: 1988
- Urban-type settlement status since: 1994

Population (2010 Census)
  - Total: 9,875
  - Estimate (2025): 8,192 (−17%)

Administrative status
  - Subordinated to: City of Makhachkala

Municipal status
  - Urban okrug: Makhachkala Urban Okrug
- Time zone: UTC+3 (MSK)
- Postal code: 367915
- OKTMO ID: 82701365056

Novy Kyakhulay population
- 2010 Census: 9,875
- 2002 Census: 6,983

Novy Kyakhulay (Russian: Но́вый Кяхула́й) is an urban locality (an urban-type settlement) under the administrative jurisdiction of Leninsky City District of the City of Makhachkala, in the Republic of Dagestan, Russia. As of the 2010 Census, its population was 9,875.

== History ==
Urban-type settlement status was granted to Novy Kyakhulay in 1994.

== Administrative and municipal status ==
Within the framework of administrative divisions, the urban-type settlement of Novy Kyakhulay is in jurisdiction of Leninsky City District of the City of Makhachkala. Within the framework of municipal divisions, Novy Kyakhulay is a part of Makhachkala Urban Okrug.
