= Leninkent, Karabudakhkentsky District, Republic of Dagestan =

Leninkent Ленинкент Шамшагар
- Selo
- Location within Republic of Dagestan Location within Russia
- Coordinates: 42°29′N 47°45′E
- Country: Russia
- Region: Republic of Dagestan
- District: Karabudakhkentsky District
- Time zone: UTC+3:00

Leninkent (Russian: Ленинкент; Dargwa: Шамшагар) is a rural locality (a selo) in Gubdensky Selsoviet, Karabudakhkentsky District, Republic of Dagestan, Russia. The population was 1,101 as of 2010. There are 6 streets.

== Geography ==
Leninkent is located 51 km northwest of Karabudakhkent (the district's administrative centre) by road. Makhachkala and Tyube are the nearest rural localities.

== Nationalities ==
Dargins live there.
