= Kyakhulay =

Kyakhulay Кяхулай
- Urban-type settlement

Other transcription(s)
  - Kumyk: Кяхулай-Торкъали
- Interactive map of Kyakhulay
- Location of Kyakhulay Kyakhulay (Republic of Dagestan)
- Coordinates: 42°58′N 47°29′E
- Country: Russia
- Federal subject: Dagestan
- Administrative district: Sovetsky City District
- Urban-type settlement status since: 1992
- Elevation: 9 m (30 ft)

Population (2010 Census)
  - Total: 6,962
  - Estimate (2025): 7,456 (+7.1%)

Administrative status
  - Subordinated to: City of Makhachkala

Municipal status
  - Urban okrug: Makhachkala Urban Okrug
- Time zone: UTC+3 (MSK)
- Postal code: 367021
- OKTMO ID: 82701370066

Kyakhulay population
- 2010 Census: 6,962
- 2002 Census: 5,353

Kyakhulay (Russian: Кяхула́й; Kumyk: Кяхулай-Торкъали, Käxulay-Torqali) is an urban locality (an urban-type settlement) under the administrative jurisdiction of Sovetsky City District of the City of Makhachkala in the Republic of Dagestan, Russia. At the 2010 Census, its population was 6,962.

== History ==
Urban-type settlement status was granted to Kyakhulay in 1992.

== Administrative and municipal status ==
Within the framework of administrative divisions, the urban-type settlement of Kyakhulay is in jurisdiction of Sovetsky City District of the City of Makhachkala. Within the framework of municipal divisions, Kyakhulay is a part of Makhachkala Urban Okrug.
