= Alburikent =

Alburikent Альбурикент
- Urban-type settlement

Other transcription(s)
  - Kumyk: Албёригент
  - Avar and Dargwa: Албурикент
- Interactive map of Alburikent
- Location of Alburikent Alburikent (Republic of Dagestan)
- Coordinates: 42°58′27″N 47°28′16″E
- Country: Russia
- Federal subject: Dagestan
- Administrative district: Sovetsky City District
- Urban-type settlement status since: 1992

Population (2010 Census)
  - Total: 12,413
  - Estimate (2025): 10,650 (−14.2%)

Administrative status
  - Subordinated to: City of Makhachkala

Municipal status
  - Urban okrug: Makhachkala Urban Okrug
- Time zone: UTC+3 (MSK)
- Postal code: 367910
- OKTMO ID: 82701370061

Alburikent population
- 2010 Census: 12,413
- 2002 Census: 6,851

Alburikent (Russian: Альбурике́нт; Kumyk: Албёригент, Albörigent) is an urban locality (an urban-type settlement) under the administrative jurisdiction of Sovetsky City District of the City of Makhachkala in the Republic of Dagestan, Russia. As of the 2010 Census, its population was 12,413.

== History ==
Urban-type settlement status was granted to Alburikent in 1992.

== Administrative and municipal status ==
Within the framework of administrative divisions, the urban-type settlement of Alburikent is in jurisdiction of Sovetsky City District of the City of Makhachkala. Within the framework of municipal divisions, Alburikent is a part of Makhachkala Urban Okrug.
