= Nechayevka, Altai Krai =

Nechayevka Нечаевка
- Settlement
- Location within Altai Krai Location within Russia
- Coordinates: 53°21′N 79°47′E
- Country: Russia
- Region: Altai Krai
- District: Khabarsky District
- Time zone: UTC+7:00

Nechayevka (Russian: Нечаевка) is a rural locality (a settlement) in Sverdlovsky Selsoviet, Khabarsky District, Altai Krai, Russia. The population was 6 as of 2013. It was founded in 1908. There are 2 streets.

== Geography ==
Nechayevka is located 44 km southeast of Khabary (the district's administrative centre) by road. Sverdlovskoye is the nearest rural locality.
