= Bavtugay =

Bavtugay Бавтугай
- Urban-type settlement
- Interactive map of Bavtugay
- Location of Bavtugay Bavtugay (Republic of Dagestan)
- Coordinates: 43°10′N 46°51′E
- Country: Russia
- Federal subject: Dagestan
- Urban-type settlement status since: 1992
- Elevation: 105 m (344 ft)

Population (2010 Census)
  - Total: 4,765
  - Estimate (2025): 4,485 (−5.9%)

Administrative status
  - Subordinated to: Town of Kizilyurt

Municipal status
  - Urban okrug: Kizilyurt Urban Okrug
- Time zone: UTC+3 (MSK)
- Postal code: 368101
- OKTMO ID: 82725000056

Bavtugay population
- 2010 Census: 4,765
- 2002 Census: 5,042

Bavtugay (Russian: Бавтугай) is an urban locality (an urban-type settlement) under the administrative jurisdiction of the Town of Kizilyurt in the Republic of Dagestan, Russia. As of the 2010 Census, its population was 4,765.

== History ==
Urban-type settlement status was granted to Bavtugay in 1992.

== Administrative and municipal status ==
Within the framework of administrative divisions, the urban-type settlement of Bavtugay is in jurisdiction of the Town of Kizilyurt. Within the framework of municipal divisions, Bavtugay is a part of Kizilyurt Urban Okrug.
