= 2010 Vladikavkaz bombing =

2010 bombing in Vladikavkaz, North Ossetia–Alania, Russia

- Location: Vladikavkaz, North Ossetia–Alania
- Date: 9 September 2010 (UTC+3)
- Attack type: Suicide car bomb
- Deaths: 17 (including the perpetrator)
- Injuries: 161

The 2010 Vladikavkaz bombing took place at the Central market in Vladikavkaz, North Ossetia–Alania, Russia on 9 September 2010 when a suicide car bomber detonated his explosives killing at least 17 and injuring more than 160.

== Background ==
The Central market has been a target of terrorist attacks twice: in 1999, when a car explosion killed 52 people, and in 2008, when a female suicide bomber detonated herself at the bus stop near the market, claiming the lives of 12 people and injuring 41.

== Attack ==
A second bomb discovered in a car near the site of the first explosion was successfully defused.

== Investigation ==
The remains of the suicide attacker's decapitated corpse were discovered. Russia's president, Dmitry Medvedev, condemned the attack as "monstrous". The prime minister, Vladimir Putin, said the attack was designed to "sow enmity between our citizens". He called on Russia's substantial Muslim population to make a "decisive contribution" in the fight against extremism.

== Casualties ==
At least 4 ethnic Armenians, including 1 Armenian citizen, were among the dead. Armenians were also among the injured.

== See also ==
- List of terrorist incidents, 2010
- 1999 Vladikavkaz bombing
- 2008 Vladikavkaz bombing
