= Sulak, Kohgiluyeh and Boyer-Ahmad =

Sulak سولك
- Village
- Location within Iran
- Coordinates: 30°40′08″N 50°31′38″E
- Country: Iran
- Province: Kohgiluyeh and Boyer-Ahmad
- County: Kohgiluyeh
- Bakhsh: Central
- Rural District: Dehdasht-e Gharbi

Population (2006)
  - Total: 54
- Time zone: UTC+3:30 (IRST)
  - Summer (DST): UTC+4:30 (IRDT)

Sulak (Persian: سولك, also Romanized as Sūlak; also known as Salbak) is a village in Dehdasht-e Gharbi Rural District, in the Central District of Kohgiluyeh County, Kohgiluyeh and Boyer-Ahmad Province, Iran. At the 2006 census, its population was 54, in 10 families.
