= Shamkhal, Russia =

Shamkhal Шамхал
- Urban-type settlement

Other transcription(s)
  - Kumyk: Шаухал
- Interactive map of Shamkhal
- Location of Shamkhal Shamkhal (Republic of Dagestan)
- Coordinates: 43°04′N 47°20′E
- Country: Russia
- Federal subject: Dagestan
- Administrative district: Kirovsky City District
- Urban-type settlement status since: 1965

Population (2010 Census)
  - Total: 11,855
  - Estimate (2025): 11,284 (−4.8%)

Administrative status
  - Subordinated to: City of Makhachkala

Municipal status
  - Urban okrug: Makhachkala Urban Okrug
- Time zone: UTC+3 (MSK)
- Postal code: 367912
- OKTMO ID: 82701362061

Shamkhal population
- 2010 Census: 11,855
- 2002 Census: 7,823
- 1989 Census: 5,390
- 1979 Census: 4,359

Shamkhal (Russian: Шамха́л; Kumyk: Шаухал, Şauxal) is an urban locality (an urban-type settlement) under the administrative jurisdiction of Kirovsky City District of the City of Makhachkala in the Republic of Dagestan, Russia. As of the 2010 Census, its population was 11,855.

== History ==
Urban-type settlement status was granted to Shamkhal in 1965.

== Administrative and municipal status ==
Within the framework of administrative divisions, the urban-type settlement of Shamkhal is in jurisdiction of Kirovsky City District of the City of Makhachkala. Within the framework of municipal divisions, Shamkhalis a part of Makhachkala Urban Okrug.
