= Sulak, Republic of Dagestan =

Sulak Сулак
- Urban-type settlement

Other transcription(s)
  - Nogay: Солак
- Interactive map of Sulak
- Location of Sulak Sulak (Republic of Dagestan)
- Coordinates: 43°17′N 47°32′E
- Country: Russia
- Federal subject: Dagestan
- Administrative district: Kirovsky City District
- Urban-type settlement status since: 1949

Population (2010 Census)
  - Total: 8,565
  - Estimate (2025): 9,758 (+13.9%)

Administrative status
  - Subordinated to: City of Makhachkala

Municipal status
  - Urban okrug: Makhachkala Urban Okrug
- Time zone: UTC+3 (MSK)
- Postal code: 367902
- OKTMO ID: 82701362066

Sulak population
- 2010 Census: 8,565
- 2002 Census: 6,352
- 1989 Census: 3,626
- 1979 Census: 3,399

Sulak (Russian: Сула́к; Nogai: Солак, Solak) is an urban locality (an urban-type settlement) under the administrative jurisdiction of Kirovsky City District of the City of Makhachkala in the Republic of Dagestan, Russia. As of the 2010 Census, its population was 8,565.

== History ==
Urban-type settlement status was granted to Sulak in 1949.

== Administrative and municipal status ==
Within the framework of administrative divisions, the urban-type settlement of Sulak is in jurisdiction of Kirovsky City District of the City of Makhachkala. Within the framework of municipal divisions, Sulak is a part of Makhachkala Urban Okrug.

== Climate ==
Climate data for Sulak (extremes 1930–present)
Month	Jan	Feb	Mar	Apr	May	Jun	Jul	Aug	Sep	Oct	Nov	Dec	Year
Record high °C (°F)	9.3 (48.7)	7.8 (46.0)	9.7 (49.5)	13.4 (56.1)	17.9 (64.2)	20.2 (68.4)	26.8 (80.2)	24.1 (75.4)	22.5 (72.5)	16.9 (62.4)	11.4 (52.5)	10.1 (50.2)	26.8 (80.2)
Mean daily maximum °C (°F)	−5.7 (21.7)	−4.6 (23.7)	−1.5 (29.3)	2.9 (37.2)	7.2 (45.0)	11.2 (52.2)	13.9 (57.0)	14.2 (57.6)	10.7 (51.3)	6.3 (43.3)	0.0 (32.0)	−3.6 (25.5)	4.2 (39.7)
Daily mean °C (°F)	−9.1 (15.6)	−8.7 (16.3)	−5.9 (21.4)	−1.5 (29.3)	2.9 (37.2)	6.8 (44.2)	9.7 (49.5)	10.0 (50.0)	6.5 (43.7)	2.1 (35.8)	−3.5 (25.7)	−6.7 (19.9)	0.2 (32.4)
Mean daily minimum °C (°F)	−12.1 (10.2)	−11.9 (10.6)	−9.3 (15.3)	−4.9 (23.2)	−0.3 (31.5)	3.4 (38.1)	6.5 (43.7)	6.7 (44.1)	3.3 (37.9)	−0.8 (30.6)	−6.4 (20.5)	−9.5 (14.9)	−2.9 (26.7)
Record low °C (°F)	−31.1 (−24.0)	−28.6 (−19.5)	−28.4 (−19.1)	−23.7 (−10.7)	−15.0 (5.0)	−9.1 (15.6)	−5.1 (22.8)	−4.4 (24.1)	−13.6 (7.5)	−22.6 (−8.7)	−26.6 (−15.9)	−28.1 (−18.6)	−31.1 (−24.0)
Average precipitation mm (inches)	30 (1.2)	38 (1.5)	77 (3.0)	100 (3.9)	122 (4.8)	143 (5.6)	138 (5.4)	86 (3.4)	75 (3.0)	53 (2.1)	43 (1.7)	31 (1.2)	936 (36.8)
Source: pogoda.ru.net
