= Leninkent, Makhachkala, Republic of Dagestan =

Leninkent Ленинкент
- Urban-type settlement
- Interactive map of Leninkent
- Location of Leninkent Leninkent (Republic of Dagestan)
- Coordinates: 42°29′N 47°45′E
- Country: Russia
- Federal subject: Dagestan
- Administrative district: Kirovsky City District
- Founded: 1924
- Urban-type settlement status since: 1965
- Elevation: 35 m (115 ft)

Population (2010 Census)
  - Total: 15,532
  - Estimate (2025): 19,795 (+27.4%)

Administrative status
  - Subordinated to: City of Makhachkala

Municipal status
  - Urban okrug: Makhachkala Urban Okrug
- Time zone: UTC+3 (MSK)
- Postal code: 367901
- OKTMO ID: 82701362056

Leninkent population
- 2010 Census: 15,532
- 2002 Census: 12,995
- 1989 Census: 5,642
- 1979 Census: 3,585

Leninkent (Russian: Ленинке́нт) (Chechen: ХӀинжа-гӀала) is an urban locality (an urban-type settlement) under the administrative jurisdiction of Kirovsky City District of the City of Makhachkala in the Republic of Dagestan, Russia. As of the 2010 Census, its population was 15,532.

== History ==
Urban-type settlement status was granted to Leninkent in 1965.

== Administrative and municipal status ==
Within the framework of administrative divisions, the urban-type settlement of Leninkent is in jurisdiction of Kirovsky City District of the City of Makhachkala. Within the framework of municipal divisions, Leninkent is a part of Makhachkala Urban Okrug.
