= Novy Sulak =

Novy Sulak Новый Сулак
- Urban-type settlement
- Interactive map of Novy Sulak
- Location of Novy Sulak Novy Sulak (Republic of Dagestan)
- Coordinates: 43°13′N 46°49′E
- Country: Russia
- Federal subject: Dagestan
- Urban-type settlement status since: 1992

Population (2010 Census)
  - Total: 3,423
  - Estimate (2025): 4,196 (+22.6%)

Administrative status
  - Subordinated to: Town of Kizilyurt

Municipal status
  - Urban okrug: Kizilyurt Urban Okrug
- Time zone: UTC+3 (MSK)
- Postal code: 368107
- OKTMO ID: 82725000061

Novy Sulak population
- 2010 Census: 3,423
- 2002 Census: 5,094

Novy Sulak (Russian: Новый Сулак) is an urban locality (an urban-type settlement) under the administrative jurisdiction of the Town of Kizilyurt in the Republic of Dagestan, Russia. As of the 2010 Census, its population was 3,423.

== History ==
Urban-type settlement status was granted to Novy Sulak in 1992.

== Administrative and municipal status ==
Within the framework of administrative divisions, the urban-type settlement of Novy Sulak is in jurisdiction of the Town of Kizilyurt. Within the framework of municipal divisions, Novy Sulak is a part of Kizilyurt Urban Okrug.
