= Kizilyurt =

Town in the Republic of Dagestan, Russia

Kizilyurt Кизилюрт
- Town

Other transcription(s)
  - Kumyk: Чир-юрт / Къызыл-юрт
  - Avar: Гъизилюрт
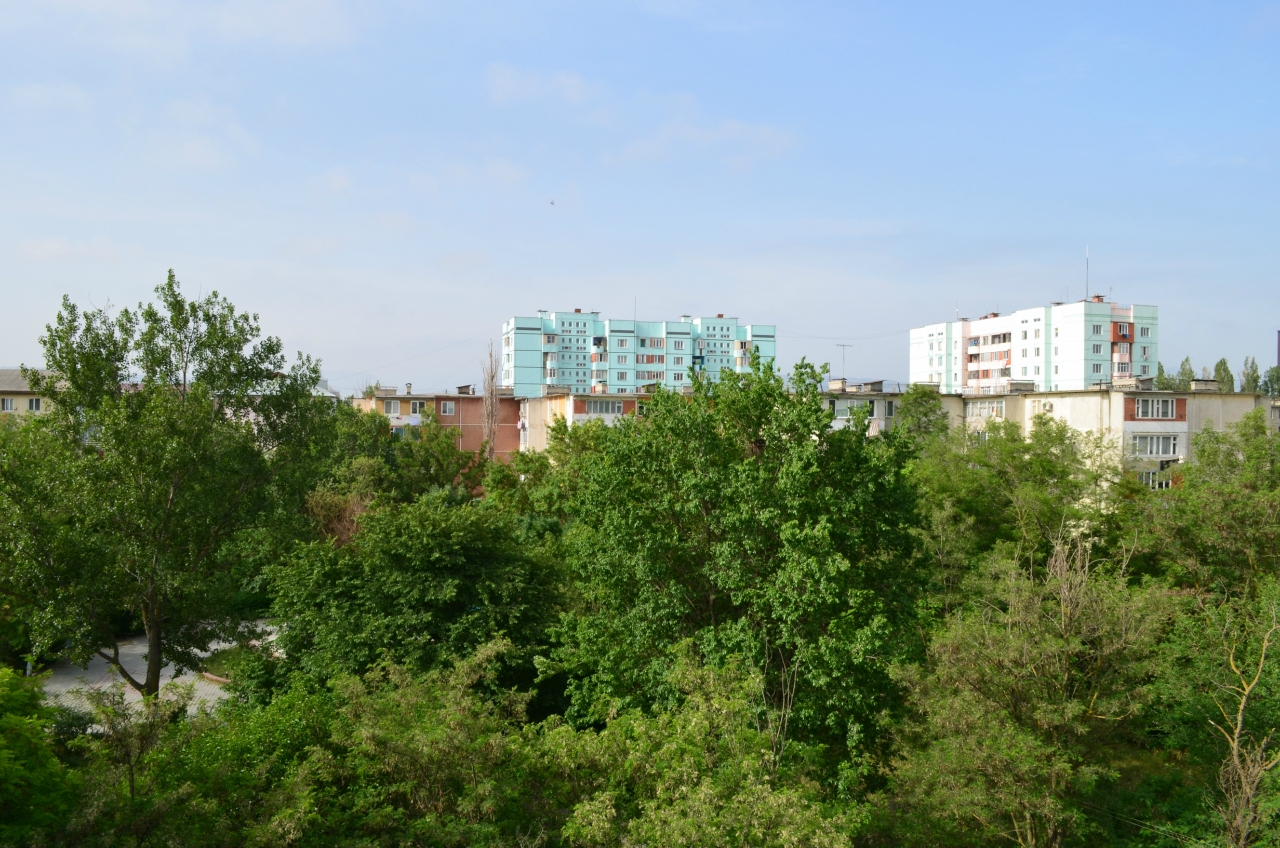
- View of Kizilyurt

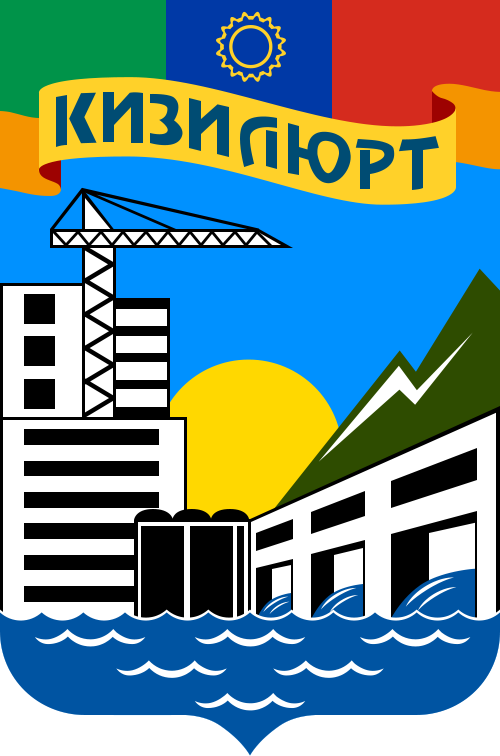
- Coat of arms
- Interactive map of Kizilyurt
- Location of Kizilyurt Kizilyurt (Republic of Dagestan)
- Coordinates: 43°13′N 46°52′E
- Country: Russia
- Federal subject: Dagestan
- Founded: 1963

Area
  - Total: 50 km^{2} (19 sq mi)
- Elevation: 45 m (148 ft)

Population (2010 Census)
  - Total: 32,988
  - Estimate (2021): 38,335 (+16.2%)
  - Density: 660/km^{2} (1,700/sq mi)

Administrative status
  - Subordinated to: Town of Kizilyurt
  - Capital of: Kizilyurtovsky District, Town of Kizilyurt

Municipal status
  - Urban okrug: Kizilyurt Urban Okrug
  - Capital of: Kizilyurt Urban Okrug, Kizilyurtovsky Municipal District
- Time zone: UTC+3 (MSK)
- Postal code: 368124
- OKTMO ID: 82725000001

Kizilyurt (Russian: Кизилю́рт; Avar: Гъизилюрт; Kumyk: Къызыл-юрт, Qızıl-yurt) is a town in the Republic of Dagestan, Russia, about 53 kilometers (33 mi) northwest of Makhachkala. Population: 32,988 (2010 census); 30,264 (2002 census); 33,682 (1989 Soviet census). It is located where the north-flowing Sulak River leaves the mountains and enters the Terek-Sulak Lowland.

== Etymology ==
The name Kizilyurt is of Kumyk origin. It consists of the Turkic words of kyzyl (red) and yurt (village).

== History ==
It was founded in 1963 by merging the work settlements of Kizilyurt, Bavtugay (Бавтугай), and Sulak (Сулак).

== Administrative and municipal status ==
Within the framework of administrative divisions, Kizilyurt serves as the administrative center of Kizilyurtovsky District, even though it is not a part of it. As an administrative division, it is, together with two settlements of urban type (Bavtugay and Novy Sulak) and one rural locality (the selo of Stary Bavtugay), incorporated separately as the Town of Kizilyurt—an administrative unit with the status equal to that of the districts. As a municipal division, the Town of Kizilyurt is incorporated as Kizilyurt Urban Okrug.

== Demographics ==
Ethnic groups in the city administrative area (2002 census):

- Avars (70.3%)
- Kumyks (12.7%)
- Laks (5.4%)
- Russians (4.2%)
- Dargins (2.3%)
- Lezgins (2.3%)
- Chechens (1.0%)

Ethnic groups as of the 2021 census:

- Avars (73.4%)
- Kumyks (12.7%)
- Laks (4.1%)
- Lezgins (3.2%)
- Russians (2.2%)
- Dargins (1.8%)
- Chechens (0.5%)

== Climate ==
Kizilyurt has a hot-summer humid continental climate (Köppen Dfa), very close to being classified as a cool semi-arid climate (BSk), and characterised by freezing winters and very warm summers. Average annual precipitation is quite low at around 381 millimetres or 15 inches.

Climate data for Kizilyurt
Month	Jan	Feb	Mar	Apr	May	Jun	Jul	Aug	Sep	Oct	Nov	Dec	Year
Mean daily maximum °C (°F)	1.9 (35.4)	3.1 (37.6)	7.7 (45.9)	15.8 (60.4)	22.4 (72.3)	27.1 (80.8)	29.7 (85.5)	29.0 (84.2)	23.7 (74.7)	16.9 (62.4)	9.7 (49.5)	4.5 (40.1)	16.0 (60.7)
Daily mean °C (°F)	−1.2 (29.8)	−0.2 (31.6)	4.0 (39.2)	11.0 (51.8)	17.5 (63.5)	22.2 (72.0)	25.0 (77.0)	24.3 (75.7)	19.1 (66.4)	12.8 (55.0)	6.4 (43.5)	1.7 (35.1)	11.9 (53.4)
Mean daily minimum °C (°F)	−4.3 (24.3)	−3.4 (25.9)	0.4 (32.7)	6.3 (43.3)	12.7 (54.9)	17.3 (63.1)	20.3 (68.5)	19.6 (67.3)	14.6 (58.3)	8.7 (47.7)	3.2 (37.8)	−1.1 (30.0)	7.9 (46.2)
Average precipitation mm (inches)	20 (0.8)	24 (0.9)	21 (0.8)	27 (1.1)	43 (1.7)	49 (1.9)	37 (1.5)	30 (1.2)	39 (1.5)	38 (1.5)	31 (1.2)	22 (0.9)	381 (15)
Source: Climate-Data.org

== Notable people ==
- Tagir Khaybulaev, men's Olympic gold medallist in judo
- Umar Nurmagomedov, men's professional mixed martial artist, UFC and formerly Eagles fighting championship bantamweight fighter and former Combat Sambo world champion
- Usman Nurmagomedov, men's professional mixed martial artist, Bellator lightweight world champion and younger brother of Umar Nurmagomedov
