= Kizilyurtovsky District =

Kizilyurtovsky District Кизилюртовский район (Russian)
- District

Other transcription(s)
  - Avar: Гъизилюрт мухъ
  - Kumyk: Къызылюрт якъ
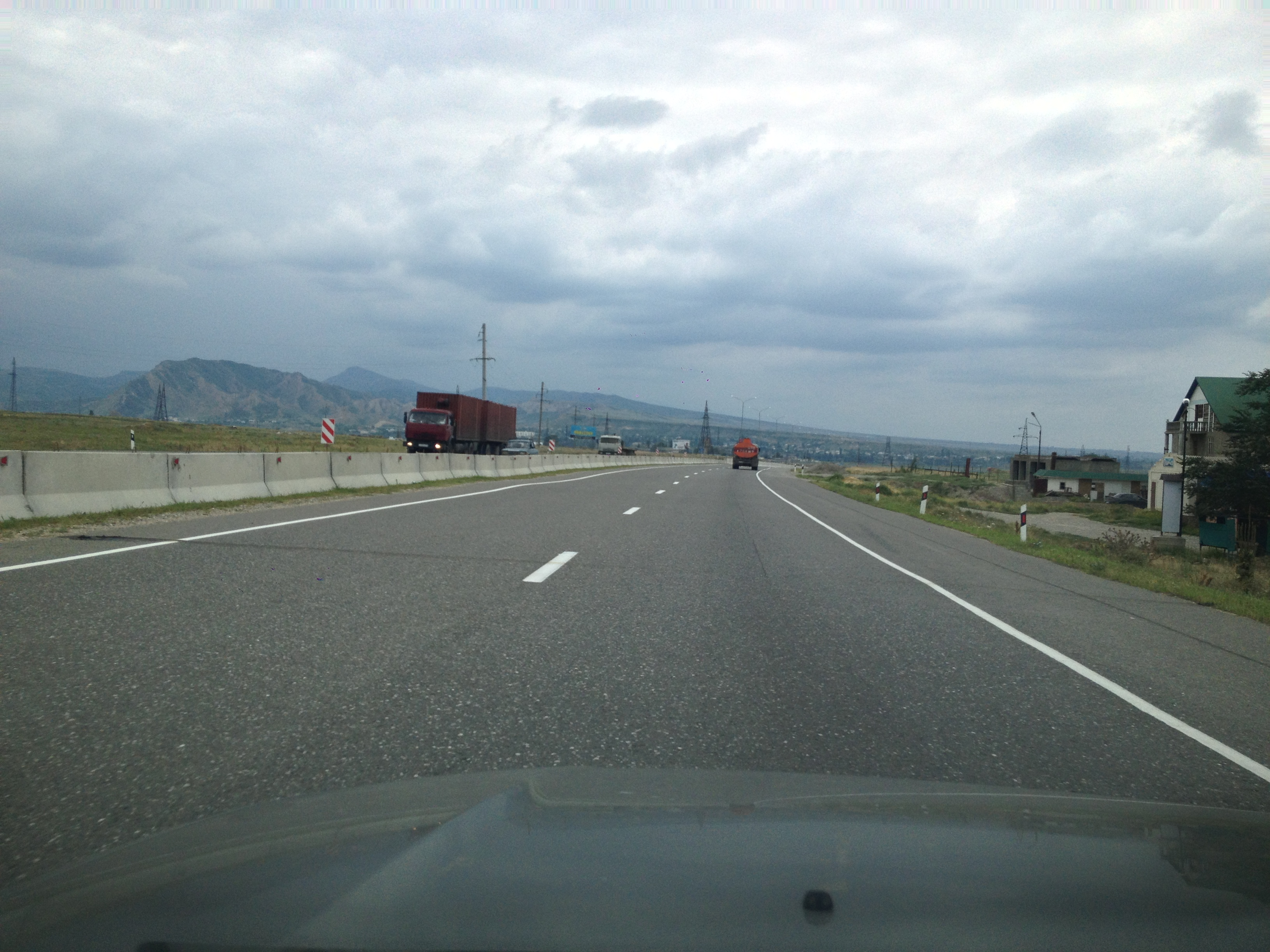
- Highway in Kizilyurtovsky District

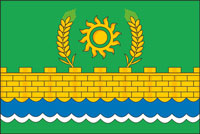
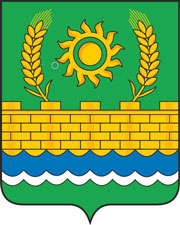
- Flag Coat of arms
- Location of Kizilyurtovsky District in the Republic of Dagestan
- Coordinates: 43°12′N 46°53′E
- Country: Russia
- Federal subject: Republic of Dagestan
- Established: 1944
- Administrative center: Kizilyurt

Area
  - Total: 524.01 km^{2} (202.32 sq mi)

Population (2010 Census)
  - Total: 61,876
  - Density: 118.08/km^{2} (305.83/sq mi)
  - Urban: 0%
  - Rural: 100%

Administrative structure
  - Administrative divisions: 3 Selsoviets
  - Inhabited localities: 16 rural localities

Municipal structure
  - Municipally incorporated as: Kizilyurtovsky Municipal District
  - Municipal divisions: 0 urban settlements, 13 rural settlements
- Time zone: UTC+3 (MSK)
- OKTMO ID: 82626000
- Website: http://www.mr-kizilyurt.ru

Population of Kizilyurtovsky District
- 2010 Census: 61,876
- 2002 Census: 70,440
- 1989 Census: 53,991
- 1979 Census: 44,659

Kizilyurtovsky District (Note: Russian: Кизилюртовский район, romanized: Kizilyurtovskiy rayon; Avar: Гъизилюрт мухъ, romanized: Ghizilyurt muq; Kumyk: Къызылюрт якъ, romanized: Qızılyurt yaq) is an administrative and municipal district (raion), one of the forty-one in the Republic of Dagestan, Russia. It is located in the center of the republic. The area of the district is 524.01 square kilometers (202.32 sq mi). Its administrative center is the town of Kizilyurt (which is not administratively a part of the district). As of the 2010 Census, the total population of the district was 61,876.

== Administrative and municipal status ==
Within the framework of administrative divisions, Kizilyurtovsky District is one of the forty-one in the republic. It is divided into three selsoviets, comprising sixteen rural localities. The town of Kizilyurt serves as its administrative center, despite being incorporated separately as an administrative unit with the status equal to that of the districts.

As a municipal division, the district is incorporated as Kizilyurtovsky Municipal District. Its three selsoviets are incorporated as thirteen rural settlements within the municipal district. The Town of Kizilyurt is incorporated separately from the district as Kizilyurt Urban Okrug, but serves as the administrative center of the municipal district as well.
