= Buynaksk constituency =

Buynaksk single-member constituency
- Constituency of the Russian State Duma
- Deputy: Nurbagand Nurbagandov; United Russia
- Federal subject: Republic of Dagestan
- Districts: Akhvakhsky, Botlikhsky, Buynaksk, Buynaksky, Charodinsky, Gergebilsky, Gumbetovsky, Gunibsky, Kazbekovsky, Khasavyurt, Khasavyurtovsky, Khunzakhsky, Levashinsky, Novolaksky, Shamilsky, Tlyaratinsky, Tsumadinsky, Tsuntinsky, Untsukulsky
- Voters: 575,209 (2026)

The Buynaksk constituency (No.11 (Note: No.10 in 1993–2007, Southern constituency No.12 in 2016–2026)) is a Russian legislative constituency in Republic of Dagestan. The constituency covers western Dagestan, mostly populated by Avars, Chechens and Kumyks.

The constituency has been represented since 2026 by United Russia deputy Nurbagand Nurbagandov, two-term State Duma member and former school principal, who won the open seat after defeating three-term United Russia incumbent Dzhamaladin Gasanov in the primary.

== Boundaries ==
1993–2003: Achisu, Agulsky District, Akhtynsky District, Akhvakhsky District, Akushinsky District, Botlikhsky District, Buynaksk, Buynaksky District, Charodinsky District, Dagestanskiye Ogni, Dakhadayevsky District, Derbent, Derbentsky District, Dokuzparinsky District, Gergebilsky District, Gumbetovsky District, Gunibsky District, Izerbash, Kayakentsky District, Kaytagsky District, Khivsky District, Khunzakhsky District, Kulinsky District, Kurakhsky District, Laksky District, Levashinsky District, Magaramkentsky District, Rutulsky District, Sergokalinsky District, Shamilsky District, Suleyman-Stalsky District, Tabasaransky District, Tlyaratinsky District, Tsumadinsky District, Tsuntinsky District, Untsukulsky District
The constituency covered southern half of Dagestan including the and towns of Buynaksk, Dagestanskiye Ogni and Derbent.

2003–2007: Akhvakhsky District, Botlikhsky District, Buynaksk, Buynaksky District, Charodinsky District, Gergebilsky District, Gumbetovsky District, Gunibsky District, Kazbekovsky District, Khasavyurt, Khasavyurtovsky District, Khunzakhsky District, Kumtorkalinsky District, Levashinsky District, Novolaksky District, Shamilsky District, Tlyaratinsky District, Tsumadinsky District, Tsuntinsky District, Untsukulsky District
The constituency was significantly altered after the 2003 redistricting, as Dagestan gained a third seat – Derbent constituency, which was formed from the Buynaksk constituency's Caspian Sea coast and south-western mountainous Dagestan. The constituency retained Avar-heavy western Dagestan and gained Khasavyurt, Kazbekovsky, Khasavyurtovsky, Kumtorkalinsky and Novolaksky districts from Makhachkala constituency.

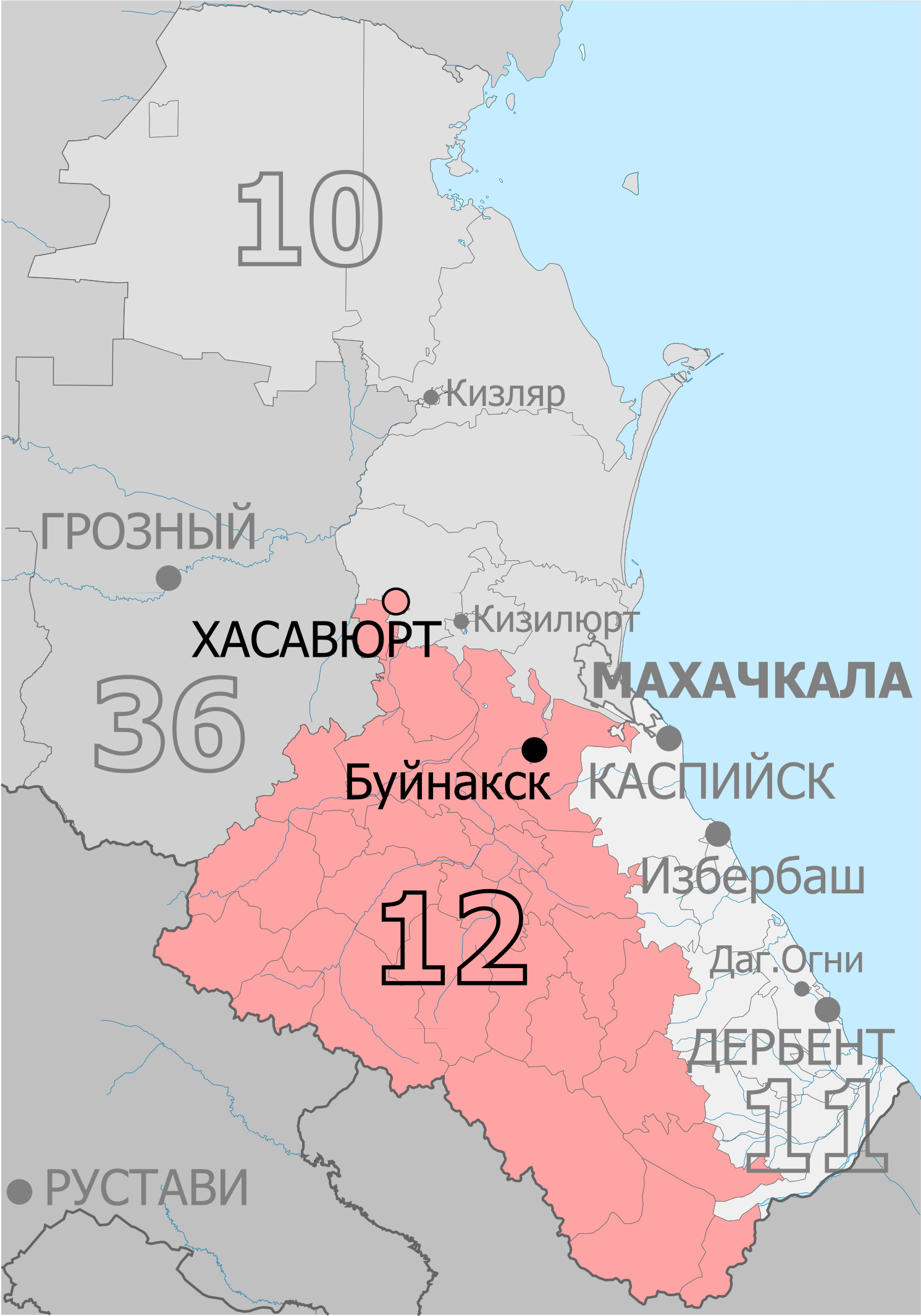
Constituency boundaries from 2016 to 2026

2016–2026 Southern constituency: Agulsky District, Akhvakhsky District, Akushinsky District, Botlikhsky District, Buynaksk, Buynaksky District, Charodinsky District, Dakhadayevsky District, Dokuzparinsky District, Gergebilsky District, Gumbetovsky District, Gunibsky District, Kazbekovsky District, Khasavyurt, Khunzakhsky District, Kulinsky District, Kurakhsky District, Laksky District, Levashinsky District, Novolaksky District, Rutulsky District, Shamilsky District, Tlyaratinsky District, Tsumadinsky District, Tsuntinsky District, Untsukulsky District
The constituency was re-created for the 2016 election and received a new name "Southern constituency". This seat retained almost all of its former territory, losing its northern parts to Northern constituency. The constituency gained mountainous south-western Dagestan from the former Derbent constituency.

2026–present: Akhvakhsky District, Botlikhsky District, Buynaksk, Buynaksky District, Charodinsky District, Gergebilsky District, Gumbetovsky District, Gunibsky District, Kazbekovsky District, Khasavyurt, Khasavyurtovsky District, Khunzakhsky District, Levashinsky District, Novolaksky District, Shamilsky District, Tlyaratinsky District, Tsumadinsky District, Tsuntinsky District, Untsukulsky District
After the 2025 redistricting the constituency took its old name "Buynaksk constituency" and regained Khasavyurtovsky District from the former Northern constituency. The constituency lost most of south-western Dagestan to Derbent constituency, nearly receiving its 2003–2007 borders.

== Members elected ==
Election	Member	Party
1993	Gamid Gamidov	Independent
1995	Ramazan Abdulatipov (Note: appointed Deputy Chairman of the Government of Russia in August 1997)	Independent
1998	Magomedfazil Azizov	Independent
1999	Gadzhimurad Omarov	Independent
2003	Magomed Gadzhiyev	Independent
2007	Proportional representation - no election by constituency	
2011	Proportional representation - no election by constituency	
2016	Abdulmazhid Magramov	United Russia
2021	Dzhamaladin Gasanov	United Russia
2026	Nurbagand Nurbagandov	United Russia

== Election results ==
=== 1993 ===
==== Declared candidates ====
- Magomed Chartayev (APR), former Member of the CPSU Central Control Commission (1990–1991), kolkhoz chairman, economist
- Gamid Gamidov (Independent), Member of Supreme Council of Dagestan (1992–present), chairman of the Sberbank regional office
- Sheyikh Ismailov (Civic Union), rector of Dagestan State Pedagogical University (1987–present)
- Omar Kurbanov (Independent), banker
- Gamidulakh Magomedov (Independent), director of the Dagestan Scientific Institute of Education
- Magomat Saidov (Independent), First Deputy Minister of Industry and Communications of Dagestan
- Bayram Salayev (PRES), entrepreneur

==== Withdrawn candidates ====
- Gapiz Musayev (Independent), associate professor of theoretical physics
- Agalar Pulatov (Independent), militsiya colonel
- Gamid Shikhakhmedov (YaBL), First Deputy Chairman of the Dagestan State Committee on Economy

==== Results ====
Summary of the 12 December 1993 Russian legislative election in the Buynaksk constituency
Candidate	Party	Votes	%
Gamid Gamidov	Independent	173,861	43.86%
Gamidulakh Magomedov	Independent	80,547	20.32%
Magomat Saidov	Independent	48,474	12.23%
Omar Kurbanov	Independent	30,190	7.62%
Magomed Chartayev	Agrarian Party	24,047	6.07%
Sheyikh Ismailov	Civic Union	14,214	3.59%
Bayram Salayev	Party of Russian Unity and Accord	4,271	1.08%
against all		8,338	2.10%
Total		396,444	100%

=== 1995 ===
==== Declared candidates ====
- Ramazan Abdulatipov (Independent), Deputy Chairman of the Federation Council (1994–present), former Chairman of the Soviet of Nationalities of the Supreme Soviet of Russia (1990–1993), 1991 vice presidential candidate
- Sufiyan Ismailov (PST), banker
- Marat Mekhtikhanov (CPRF), journalist
- Asadula Nasrulayev (LDPR), corporate executive
- Magomed Radzhabov (Independent), banker
- Shekhsefi Sefikhanov (Independent), Chairman of the Dagestan State Committee on Land Resources and Land Management

==== Withdrawn candidates ====
- Nizami Abdulgamidov (Independent), lecturer in political economy
- Amir Amirov (PGL), businessman
- Ruslan Gadzhibekov (Independent), Chairman of the Kaspiysk City Assembly (1994–present), businessman
- Nasir Gaydarov (Independent), Member of People's Assembly of the Republic of Dagestan (1995–present), brewery director
- Magoma Saidov (Independent), First Deputy Minister of Industry, Transport, and Communications
- Azim Yarakhmedov (Independent), advisor to Embassy of Russia to Azerbaijan (1993–present)

==== Declined ====
- Gamid Gamidov (Independent), incumbent Member of State Duma (1994–present) (ran in the Makhachkala constituency)

==== Results ====
Summary of the 17 December 1995 Russian legislative election in the Buynaksk constituency
Candidate	Party	Votes	%
Ramazan Abdulatipov	Independent	204,129	45.87%
Marat Mekhtikhanov	Communist Party	80,207	18.02%
Shikhsefi Sefikhanov	Independent	42,417	9.53%
Magomed Radzhabov	Independent	32,776	7.37%
Sufiyan Ismailov	Party of Workers' Self-Government	9,352	2.10%
Asadula Nasrulayev	Liberal Democratic Party	3,119	0.70%
against all		0	0.00%
Total		444,990	100%

=== 1998 ===
Results by district: Magomedfazil Azizov: 30–40% 40–50% 50–60% 60–70% 70–80% 80–90% >90%; Magomed Aliyev: 40–50% 50–60% 60–70% 70–80% 80–90% >90%; Murad Idrisov: 40–50%

==== Declared candidates ====
- Magomed Aliyev (Independent), chairman of the Republican Party of Dagestan
- Magomedfazil Azizov (Independent), Deputy Minister of Finance of Dagestan (1996–present)
- Dzhavad Gadzhiakhmedov (Independent)
- Arkady Ganiyev (Independent), chairman of the Party of Independence and Rebirth of Dagestan
- Murad Idrisov (Independent)

==== Results ====
Summary of the 29 March 1998 by-election in the Buynaksk constituency
Candidate	Party	Votes	%
Magomedfazil Azizov	Independent	248,911	53.99%
Magomed Aliyev	Independent	166,134	36.04%
Murad Idrisov	Independent	18,500	4.01%
Arkady Ganiyev	Independent	10,104	2.19%
Dzhavad Gadzhiakhmedov	Independent	4,250	0.92%
against all		1,723	0.37%
Total		460,955	100%

=== 1999 ===
==== Declared candidates ====
- Makhach Aliyev (Independent), State Taxation Inspection officer, brother of People's Assembly of the Republic of Dagestan speaker Mukhu Aliyev
- Gamid Askerkhanov (NDR), Member of State Duma (1996–present)
- Magomed Chaguchiyev (DPA), prorector of International Accounting University
- Magomed Gadzhiyev (Independent), Deputy Head of the State Taxation Inspection in Dagestan (1998–present)
- Kumsiyat Kazanatova (Independent), Ministry of Russia for the Commonwealth of Independent States staffer
- Khizri Kilyaskhanov (Yabloko), militsiya officer
- Grigory Kuyevda (Independent), Member of State Duma (1996–present)
- Kubasay Kubasayev (Nikolayev–Fyodorov Bloc), Deputy Head of the State Committee on Antimonopoly Policy Regional Office
- Ruslan Magomedragimov (Independent), political activist
- Gadzhimurad Omarov (Independent), nonprofit president, businessman
- Magoma Saidov (Independent), Member of People's Assembly of the Republic of Dagestan (1995–present), Head of the Dagestan Department of Transport (1996–present), 1995 candidate for this seat
- Shamil Taygibov (Independent), Member of People's Assembly of the Republic of Dagestan (1995–present), light industry executive
- Magomed Tolboyev (OVR), former Member of State Duma (1994–1995)

==== Withdrawn candidates ====
- Gapiz Gapizov (Independent), businessman

==== Failed to qualify ====
- Kurbanmagomed Magomedov (Independent), former Mayor of Shamilkala (1993–1998)
- Igor Podberezkin (DN), scientific executive, brother of State Duma member Alexey Podberezkin

==== Did not file ====
- Ruslan Ashuraliev (Independent), 1972 Olympic Bronze medalist wrestler
- Magomed Shakhabasov (Independent)

==== Declined ====
- Magomedfazil Azizov (OVR), incumbent Member of State Duma (1998–present) (ran on the party list)

==== Results ====
Summary of the 19 December 1999 Russian legislative election in the Buynaksk constituency
Candidate	Party	Votes	%
Gadzhimurad Omarov	Independent	138,053	27.63%
Gamid Askerkhanov	Our Home – Russia	94,433	18.90%
Magomed Tolboyev	Fatherland – All Russia	76,122	15.23%
Ruslan Magomedragimov	Independent	65,122	13.03%
Magoma Saidov	Independent	43,842	8.77%
Magomed Gadzhiyev	Independent	25,643	5.13%
Shamil Taygibov	Independent	20,562	4.12%
Grigory Kuyevda	Independent	10,206	2.04%
Kumsiyat Kazanatova	Independent	2,412	0.48%
Makhach Aliyev	Independent	2,233	0.45%
Magomed Chaguchiyev	Movement in Support of the Army	849	0.17%
Khizri Kilyaskhanov	Yabloko	33	0.01%
against all		5,848	1.17%
Total		499,679	100%

=== 2003 ===
Results by district: Magomed Gadzhiyev: 50–60% 60–70% 70–80% 80–90% >90%; Gadzhimurad Omarov: 60–70% 80–90%

==== Declared candidates ====
- Marat Daniyalov (Independent), seismology station director
- Magomed Gadzhiyev (Independent), Deputy Head of the Ministry of Russia for Tax and Revenue Inspection in the Southern Federal District (2001–present), 1999 candidate for this seat
- Gadzhimurad Omarov (NPRF), incumbent Member of State Duma (2000–present)
- Magomed Shamilov (IPR), deputy chairman of the party regional office
- Dzhamaldin Shamkhalov (Independent), Member of Kizilyurt City Assembly

==== Withdrawn candidates ====
- Aliaskhab Kharkhachayev (Independent), corporate executive
- Saygidpasha Umakhanov (Independent), Mayor of Khasavyurt (1997–present)

==== Failed to qualify ====
- Magomedzapir Mukhumayev (Independent), private security businessman

==== Did not file ====
- Saypula Gaydarbekov (Independent), deputy chairman of the NPRF regional office
- Raziyat Nurmagomedova (Independent), methodologist
- Sulayman Uladiyev (Independent), Member of People's Assembly of the Republic of Dagestan (2003–present), Deputy Mayor of Khasavyurt

==== Results ====
Summary of the 7 December 2003 Russian legislative election in the Buynaksk constituency
Candidate	Party	Votes	%
Magomed Gadzhiyev	Independent	253,558	62.70%
Gadzhimurad Omarov (incumbent)	People's Party	136,059	33.64%
Marat Daniyalov	Independent	3,310	0.82%
Magomed Shamilov	Genuine Patriots of Russia	533	0.13%
Dzhamaldin Shamkhalov	Independent	363	0.09%
against all		5,765	1.43%
Total		405,168	100%

=== 2016 ===
==== Declared candidates ====
- Gayirbeg Abdurakhmanov (The Greens), entomologist
- Sergey Akulinichev (A Just Russia), Member of People's Assembly of the Republic of Dagestan (2011–present)
- Iraskhan Dzhafarov (LDPR), unemployed
- Vladimir Dzhikkayev (CPCR), pensioner
- Albert Esedov (Yabloko), sociology associate professor, journalist
- Khadzhimurad Gadzhiyev (CPRF), businessman
- Ibragimgadzhi Ibragimgadzhiyev (Patriots of Russia), energy executive
- Abusupyan Kharkharov (Independent), former Deputy Premier of Dagestan (2013–2014)
- Abdulmazhid Magramov (United Russia), businessman
- Dada Umarov (Rodina), former Member of Khasavyurtovsky District Assembly of Deputies (2007–2011), chairman of the regional consumers union
- Yulia Yuzik (PARNAS), journalist

==== Withdrawn candidates ====
- Sagid Sagidov (Party of Growth), Member of Novolaksky District Assembly (2013–present), career centre director
- Sazhid Sazhidov (Independent), 2004 Olympic Bronze medalist wrestler

==== Failed to qualify ====
- Shafi Akushali (PRB), construction businessman, historian
- Sergey Magomedov (Independent), State Duma staffer
- Farida Sagitayeva (Independent), nonprofit executive
- Maksim Shevchenko (Independent), Member of Presidential Council for Civil Society and Human Rights (2012–present), journalist

==== Did not file ====
- Magomed Ibragimov (Independent), aide to State Duma member Dzhamaladin Gasanov
- Abdul Akim Palchayev (Independent), businessman
- Rabazan Rabadanov (Independent), sports commentator, blogger
- Akhmed Rashidbekov (Independent), unemployed
- Aleksender Zaynukov (CPRF), retired businessman

==== Declined ====
- Yusup Magomedov (United Russia), Head of Laksky District (2007–present) (lost the primary)
- Ali Shakhbanov (United Russia), former Member of People's Assembly of the Republic of Dagestan (2007–2011), construction businessman (lost the primary)

==== Results ====
Summary of the 18 September 2016 Russian legislative election in the Southern constituency
Candidate	Party	Votes	%
Abdulmazhid Magramov	United Russia	334,008	68.71%
Abusupyan Kharkharov	Independent	130,623	26.87%
Ibragimgadzhi Ibragimgadzhiyev	Patriots of Russia	3,035	0.62%
Khadzhimurad Gadzhiyev	Communist Party	2,714	0.56%
Gayirbeg Abdurakhmanov	The Greens	1,728	0.36%
Dada Umarov	Rodina	1,725	0.35%
Iraskhan Dzhafarov	Liberal Democratic Party	1,504	0.31%
Albert Esedov	Yabloko	1,500	0.31%
Yulia Yuzik	People's Freedom Party	1,226	0.25%
Sergey Akulinichev	A Just Russia	978	0.20%
Vladimir Dzhikkayev	Communists of Russia	915	0.19%
Total		486,133	100%

=== 2021 ===
==== Declared candidates ====
- Abdulgamid Abdullayev (LDPR), perennial candidate
- Shakhlar Agakhanov (Rodina), psychiatrist, narcologist
- Sharip Aliyev (New People), AMC Fight Nights director general
- Gabibulla Bagamayev (RPPSS), HR director
- Albert Esedov (Yabloko), Member of Ikra Assembly of Deputies (2020–present), engineer, 2016 candidate for this seat
- Aznaur Gadzhimirzoyev (The Greens), former Chief State Labor Inspector of Kabardino-Balkaria (2018–2021)
- Dzhamaladin Gasanov (United Russia), former Member of State Duma (2007–2016)
- Akhmednabi Magomedov (CPRF), Member of People's Assembly of the Republic of Dagestan (2011–present)
- Gadzhimurad Omarov (SR–ZP), Member of State Duma (2000–2003, 2016–present)

==== Failed to qualify ====
- Abusupyan Kharkharov (ROS), former Deputy Premier of Dagestan (2013–2014), 2016 Independent candidate for this seat

==== Declined ====
- Abdulmazhid Magramov (United Russia), incumbent Member of State Duma (2016–present) (lost the primary)
- Gadzhimurad Musayev (United Russia), Head of Kazbekovsky District (2014–present) (lost the primary)

==== Results ====
Summary of the 17-19 September 2021 Russian legislative election in the Southern constituency
Candidate	Party	Votes	%
Dzhamaladin Gasanov	United Russia	358,063	73.37%
Gadzhimurad Omarov	A Just Russia — For Truth	70,369	14.41%
Akhmednabi Magomedov	Communist Party	21,959	4.50%
Shakhlar Agakhanov	Rodina	7,608	1.56%
Sharip Aliyev	New People	6,161	1.26%
Gabibulla Bagamayev	Party of Pensioners	5,989	1.23%
Abdulgamid Abdullayev	Liberal Democratic Party	5,599	1.15%
Aznaur Gadzhimirzoyev	The Greens	4,691	0.96%
Albert Esedov	Yabloko	2,583	0.53%
Total		488,425	100%

=== 2026 ===
==== Declared candidates ====
- Kamil Davdiyev (A Just Russia), Deputy Chairman of the People's Assembly of the Republic of Dagestan (2016–present), Member of the People's Assembly (2007–present)
- Aznaur Gadzhimirzoyev (The Greens), former Chief State Labor Inspector of Kabardino-Balkaria (2018–2021), 2021 candidate for this seat
- Abdulmedzhid Gazilayev (New People), individual entrepreneur
- Magomed Magomedov (CPRF), Member of People's Assembly of the Republic of Dagestan (2021–present), 1980, 1981, 1983 and 1984 European Champion wrestler
- Murad Mutayev (LDPR), Member of Makhachkala Assembly of Deputies (2025–present), construction businessman
- Nurbagand Nurbagandov (United Russia), Member of State Duma (2021–present)

==== Did not file ====
- Gadzhimurad Omarov (Independent), former Member of State Duma (2000–2003, 2016–2021)
- Ruslan Saidbekov (Independent), Member of Khasavyurtovsky District Assembly of Deputies (2020–present)

==== Declined ====
- Abdumuslim Abdumuslimov (United Russia), former Premier of Dagestan (2022–2026) (lost the primary)
- Dzhamaladin Gasanov (United Russia), incumbent Member of State Duma (2007–2016, 2021–present) (lost the primary)
- Khuchbar Khuchbarov (United Russia), Member of People's Assembly of the Republic of Dagestan (2016–present) (lost the primary)
- Gadzhimurad Musayev (United Russia), Head of Kazbekovsky District (2014–present) (lost the primary)

==== Results ====
Summary of the 18-20 September 2026 Russian legislative election in the Buynaksk constituency
Candidate	Party	Votes	%
Nurbagand Nurbagandov	United Russia	437,314	82.53%
Magomed Magomedov	Communist Party	31,818	6.00%
Kamil Davdiyev	A Just Russia	29,566	5.58%
Abdulmedzhid Gazilayev	New People	11,904	2.25%
Murad Mutayev	Liberal Democratic Party	10,243	1.93%
Aznaur Gadzhimirzoyev	The Greens	7,253	1.37%
Total		529,889	100%
