= Magomed Nurbagandov =

Russian police officer

- Магомед Нурбагандов
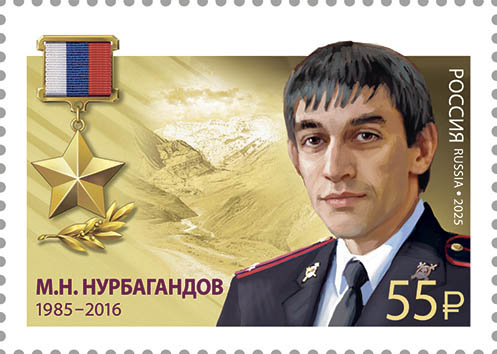
- Nurbagandov on a 2025 Russian stamp
- Born: 9 January 1985; Sergokala, Dagestan ASSR, Russian SFSR, Soviet Union
- Died: 10 July 2016 (aged 31); Sergokala, Dagestan, Russia
- Relatives: Father: Nurbagand Nurbagandov
- Military career
- Allegiance: Russia
- Branch: National Guard of Russia
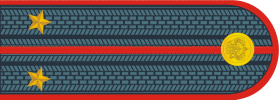
- Rank: Police Lieutenant
- Conflicts: Insurgency in the North Caucasus

Magomed Nurbagandovich Nurbagandov (Russian: Магомед Нурбагандович Нурбагандов; 9 January 1985 – 10 July 2016) was an employee of the Private Security of the Russian Guard for the city of Kaspiysk in the National Guard with the rank of police lieutenant. He was awarded the Hero of Russia posthumously in 2016. He is also the author of the phrase "Work, brothers!", which became a common catchphrase in Russia.

== Biography ==
Magomed Nurbagandov is a Dargin by nationality. Born in the village of Sergokala, he comes from the village of Urakhi in the Republic of Dagestan.

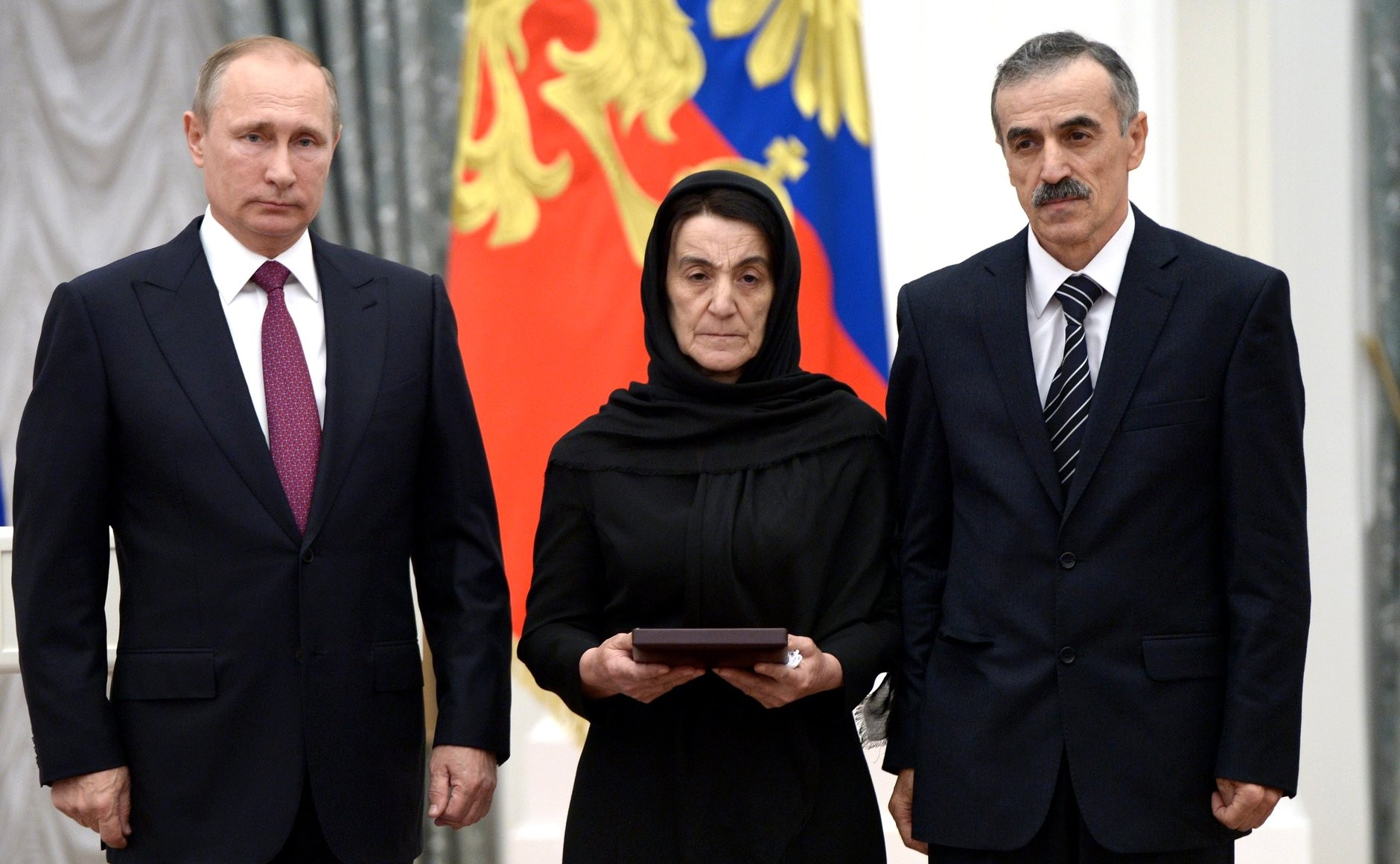
The parents of Magomed Nurbagandov with Vladimir Putin, September 22, 2016

Nurbagandov graduated from Lyceum № 2 with a gold medal in the village of Sergokala. He then graduated with honors from the Faculty of Law of Dagestan State University in Makhachkala.

He served as a legal consultant in the private security branch of the Directorate of the Federal Service for Foreign Affairs of Russia for the Republic of Dagestan in Kaspiysk.

== Attack and death ==
On July 9, 2016, Nurbagandov and his relatives were relaxing in the forest near the village of Sergokala. In the morning, five armed men approached their tent and began waking up the campers. After a short verbal skirmish, Nurbagandov's cousin Abdurashid Nurbagandov was shot dead (posthumously awarded the Order of Courage), after standing up for his young brother Arsen (survived), who was kicked by one of the attackers. Upon learning that Nurbagandov was a policeman, the attackers pushed him and his brother into the trunk of a car, drove away from the recreation area, and shot him.

The attackers, who called themselves recruits of the "Islamic State," filmed everything that was happening on a mobile phone camera and later uploaded the video to an extremist website.

Subsequently, several militants from this group were killed and two were detained. When examining the bodies of the dead, the mobile phone that the videos were filmed on was found. It became clear that the extremists published an edited version of the video online, where they had cut out Nurbagandov's last words. Before the murder, Nurbagandov was forced to call on his colleagues to leave work, but he instead said: "Work, brothers!" (Russian: Работайте, братья!).

On September 22, 2016 Nurbagandov was posthumously awarded the title of Hero of the Russian Federation for showing courage and heroism in the line of duty. At a meeting with Nurbagandov's parents, President Vladimir Putin called him a "true hero, and a true man, who under the threat of death, remained faithful to his oath, duty and to his people."

On August 16, 2017, the Supreme Court of Dagestan sentenced Aziz Dzhamaludinov to 17 years in a corrective labor colony, a fine of 100,000 rubles as well as two years on probation for the murder of the Nurbagandov brothers. On October 3, 2017, the North Caucasus District Military Court sentenced Artur Bekbolatov, who videotaped the murder of Nurbagandov, to 24 years in prison in a corrective labor colony, followed by two years on probation. Subsequently the Military Collegium of the Supreme Court of Russia changed Bekbolatov's sentence to life imprisonment. The rest of the participants in the massacre were eliminated during a special operation by the FSB in September 2016.

== Memory ==
- A monument was erected on the 7 year anniversary of his death on Abubakarov Street in Makhachkala, July 10, 2023.
- A central street in the village of Sergokala was named after Nurbagandov. Three memorial plates were also installed in the village of Sergokala. On December 27, 2018, a bust of Nurbagandov was installed in the central park of Sergokala.
- On November 10, 2016, by the Decree of the Head of the Chechen Republic a street was renamed in Nurbagandov's honor in Grozny (formerly Olympiyskiy Proezd).
- On November 26, 2016, a secondary school in Dibgalik in the Dakhadaevsky district of Dagestan was named after Nurbagandov.
- At the end of May 2017, Nikolaev Street in Makhachkala was renamed after the Nurbagandov brothers.
- On May 25, 2017, a regional award was established in the Smolensk region and was named after Magomed Nurbagandov. The first award was given to Nurbagandov's family.
- On July 10, 2019, for the third anniversary of Nurbagandov's death, the Russian Post branch in Makhachkala issued 300,000 envelopes with his portrait.
- In 2020, Sergokalinsk secondary school № 2 was named after Nurbagandov.

== See also ==
- List of Heroes of the Russian Federation
- Work, brothers!

== Links ==
- Указ Президента Российской Федерации № 486 от 21 сентября 2016 года Архивная копия от 23 сентября 2016 на Wayback Machine
- «Работайте, братья» — последние минуты жизни М. Н. Нурбагандова on YouTube
- «Работаем, братья» — видеоответ сослуживцев on YouTube
- «Работаем, брат!» Архивная копия от 7 марта 2022 на Wayback Machine — проект, посвящённый памяти Магомеда Нурбагандова
- Наталия Ефимова (10 July 2021). "Магомед Нурбагандов: пять лет подвигу". Archived from the original on 14 July 2021.
