= Nizhneye Makhargimakhi =

Nizhneye Makhargimakhi Нижнее Махаргимахи Хьар Махӏаргимахьи
- Selo
- Location within Republic of Dagestan Location within Russia
- Coordinates: 42°19′N 47°34′E
- Country: Russia
- Region: Republic of Dagestan
- District: Sergokalinsky District
- Time zone: UTC+3:00

Nizhneye Makhargimakhi (Russian: Нижнее Махаргимахи; Dargwa: Хьар Махӏаргимахьи) is a rural locality (a selo) in Burdekinskoye Rural Settlement, Sergokalinsky District, Republic of Dagestan, Russia. Population: 329 (2010 census); 424 (2002 census); 262 (1989 Soviet census). There is 1 street.

== Geography ==
Nizhneye Makhargimakhi is located 19 km south of Sergokala (the district's administrative centre) by road. Urakhi and Burdeki are the nearest rural localities.

== Nationalities ==
Dargins live there.
