= Kulibukhna =

Kulibukhna Кулибухна ХъулибухӀна
- Selo
- Location within Republic of Dagestan Location within Russia
- Coordinates: 42°18′N 47°11′E
- Country: Russia
- Region: Republic of Dagestan
- District: Levashinsky District
- Time zone: UTC+3:00

Kulibukhna (Russian: Кулибухна; Dargwa: ХъулибухӀна) is a rural locality (a selo) in Tsudakharsky Selsoviet, Levashinsky District, Republic of Dagestan, Russia. The population was 409 as of 2010. There are 4 streets.

== Geography ==
Kulibukhna is located 32 km southwest of Levashi (the district's administrative centre) by road, on the Sana River. Kuli and Kara are the nearest rural localities.

== Nationalities ==
Dargins live there.
