= Nizhny Ubekimakhi =

Nizhny Ubekimakhi Нижний Убекимахи УбяхӀ Убекимахьи
- Selo
- Location within Republic of Dagestan Location within Russia
- Coordinates: 42°23′N 47°12′E
- Country: Russia
- Region: Republic of Dagestan
- District: Levashinsky District
- Time zone: UTC+3:00

Nizhny Ubekimakhi (Russian: Нижний Убекимахи; Dargwa: УбяхӀ Убекимахьи) is a rural locality (a selo) in Khadzhalmakhinsky Selsoviet, Levashinsky District, Republic of Dagestan, Russia. The population was 802 as of 2010.

== Geography ==
Nizhny Ubekimakhi is located 19 km southwest of Levashi (the district's administrative centre) by road. Tashkapur and Chagni are the nearest rural localities.

== Nationalities ==
Dargins live there.
