= Amalte =

Amalte Амалте ГӀямалтимахьи
- Selo
- Location within Republic of Dagestan Location within Russia
- Coordinates: 42°25′N 47°06′E
- Country: Russia
- Region: Republic of Dagestan
- District: Levashinsky District
- Time zone: UTC+3:00

Amalte (Russian: Амалте; Dargwa: ГӀямалтимахьи) is a rural locality (a selo) in Kuppinsky Selsoviet, Levashinsky District, Republic of Dagestan, Russia. The population was 267 as of 2010.

== Geography ==
Amalte is located 22 km west of Levashi (the district's administrative centre) by road. Telagu and Kuppa are the nearest rural localities.

== Nationalities ==
Dargins live there.
