= Kumamakhi =

Kumamakhi Кумамахи Куймамахьи
- Selo
- Location within Republic of Dagestan Location within Russia
- Coordinates: 42°21′N 47°11′E
- Country: Russia
- Region: Republic of Dagestan
- District: Levashinsky District
- Time zone: UTC+3:00

Kumamakhi (Russian: Кумамахи; Dargwa: Куймамахьи) is a rural locality (a selo) in Musultemakhinsky Selsoviet, Levashinsky District, Republic of Dagestan, Russia. The population was 396 as of 2010. There are 3 streets.

== Geography ==
Kumamakhi is located 35 km north of Levashi (the district's administrative centre) by road. Chabanmakhi and Vanashimakhi are the nearest rural localities.

== Nationalities ==
Dargins live there.
