= Ulluaya =

Ulluaya Уллуая Хала-гIяя
- Selo
- Location within Republic of Dagestan Location within Russia
- Coordinates: 42°22′N 47°22′E
- Country: Russia
- Region: Republic of Dagestan
- District: Levashinsky District
- Time zone: UTC+3:00

Ulluaya (Russian: Уллуая; Dargwa: Хала-гIяя) is a rural locality (a selo) in Levashinsky District, Republic of Dagestan, Russia. The population was 5,962 as of 2010. There are 46 streets.

== Geography ==
Ulluaya is located 8 km southeast of Levashi (the district's administrative centre) by road, on the Khalagork River. Tagirkent and Suleybakent are the nearest rural localities.

== Nationalities ==
Dargins live there.
