= Chakhimakhi =

Chakhimakhi Чахимахи Чяхимахьи
- Selo
- Location within Republic of Dagestan Location within Russia
- Coordinates: 42°24′N 47°33′E
- Country: Russia
- Region: Republic of Dagestan
- District: Levashinsky District
- Time zone: UTC+3:00

Chakhimakhi (Russian: Чахимахи; Dargwa: Чяхимахьи) is a rural locality (a selo) in Ayalakabsky Selsoviet, Levashinsky District, Republic of Dagestan, Russia. The population was 186 as of 2010. There are 2 streets.

== Geography ==
Chakhimakhi is located 28 km west of Levashi (the district's administrative centre) by road, on the Kakaozen River. Degva and Vanashimakhi are the nearest rural localities.

== Nationalities ==
Dargins live there.
