= Allate =

Allate Аллате ГӀялате
- Selo
- Location within Republic of Dagestan Location within Russia
- Coordinates: 42°22′N 47°11′E
- Country: Russia
- Region: Republic of Dagestan
- District: Levashinsky District
- Time zone: UTC+3:00

Allate (Russian: Аллате; Dargwa: ГӀялате) is a rural locality (a selo) in Musultemakhinsky Selsoviet, Levashinsky District, Republic of Dagestan, Russia. The population was 712 as of 2010. There are 4 streets.

== Geography ==
Allate is located 29 km southwest of Levashi (the district's administrative centre) by road. Gurgumakhi and Musultemakhi are the nearest rural localities.

== Nationalities ==
Dargins live there.
