= Burtanimakhi =

Burtanimakhi Буртанимахи Буртанимахьи
- Selo
- Location within Republic of Dagestan Location within Russia
- Coordinates: 42°22′N 47°09′E
- Country: Russia
- Region: Republic of Dagestan
- District: Levashinsky District
- Time zone: UTC+3:00

Burtanimakhi (Russian: Буртанимахи; Dargwa: Буртанимахьи) is a rural locality (a selo) in Arshimakhinsky Selsoviet, Levashinsky District, Republic of Dagestan, Russia. The population was 301 as of 2010. There are 3 streets.

== Geography ==
Burtanimakhi is located 29 km southwest of Levashi (the district's administrative centre) by road. Karekadani and Tarlimakhi are the nearest rural localities.

== Nationalities ==
Dargins live there.
