= Musultemakhi =

Musultemakhi Мусультемахи МусултӀемахьи
- Selo
- Location within Republic of Dagestan Location within Russia
- Coordinates: 42°21′N 47°11′E
- Country: Russia
- Region: Republic of Dagestan
- District: Levashinsky District
- Time zone: UTC+3:00

Musultemakhi (Russian: Мусультемахи; Dargwa: МусултӀемахьи) is a rural locality (a selo) and the administrative centre of Musultemakhinsky Selsoviet, Levashinsky District, Republic of Dagestan, Russia. The population was 482 as of 2010. There are 3 streets.

== Geography ==
Musultemakhi is located 28 km southwest of Levashi (the district's administrative centre) by road. Kumamakhi and Allate are the nearest rural localities.

== Nationalities ==
Dargins live there.
