= Damkulakada =

Damkulakada Дамкулакада Дамкьулакъада
- Selo
- Location within Republic of Dagestan Location within Russia
- Coordinates: 42°25′N 47°28′E
- Country: Russia
- Region: Republic of Dagestan
- District: Levashinsky District
- Time zone: UTC+3:00

Damkulakada (Russian: Дамкулакада; Dargwa: Дамкьулакъада) is a rural locality (a selo) in Ayalakabsky Selsoviet, Levashinsky District, Republic of Dagestan, Russia. The population was 49 as of 2010. There are 2 streets.

== Geography ==
Damkulakada is located 20 km east of Levashi (the district's administrative centre) by road, on the Kakaozen River. Purrimakhi and Shikhshakak are the nearest rural localities.

== Nationalities ==
Dargins live there.
