= Bakhmakhi =

Bakhmakhi Бахмахи БахӀмахьи
- Selo
- Location within Republic of Dagestan Location within Russia
- Coordinates: 42°18′N 47°35′E
- Country: Russia
- Region: Republic of Dagestan
- District: Sergokalinsky District
- Time zone: UTC+3:00

Bakhmakhi (Russian: Бахмахи; Dargwa: БахӀмахьи) is a rural locality (a selo) in Nizhnemulebkinsky Selsoviet, Sergokalinsky District, Republic of Dagestan, Russia. Population: 227 (2010 census); 219 (2002 census); 136 (1989 Soviet census). There is 1 street.

== Geography ==
Bakhmakhi is located 27 km southwest of Sergokala (the district's administrative centre) by road. Burkhimakhi and Ullukimakhi are the nearest rural localities.

== Nationalities ==
Dargins live there.
