= Mekegi =

Mekegi Мекеги Микlхlе
- Selo
- Location within Republic of Dagestan Location within Russia
- Coordinates: 42°23′N 47°27′E
- Country: Russia
- Region: Republic of Dagestan
- District: Levashinsky District
- Time zone: UTC+3:00
- Website: www.mekegi.com

Mekegi (Russian: Мекеги; Dargwa: Микlхlе) is a rural locality (a selo) and the administrative centre of Mekeginsky Selsoviet, Levashinsky District, Republic of Dagestan, Russia. The population was 2,936 as of 2010. There are 76 streets.

== Geography ==
Mekegi is located 18 km southeast of Levashi (the district's administrative centre) by road. Tarlankak and Aylakab are the nearest rural localities.

== Nationalities ==
Dargins live there.

== Famous residents ==
- Gamid Gamidov (State Duma deputy)
- Gasan Umalatov (honored master of sports in universal combat)
- Magomedshapi Isayev (philologist, Doctor of Science; poet, Honored Scientist of the Republic of Dagestan)
- Suleyman Murtazaliyev (Chevalier of three Orders of Labor Glory)
