= Aymaumakhi =

Aymaumakhi Аймаумахи ГӀяймаумахьи
- Selo
- Location within Republic of Dagestan Location within Russia
- Coordinates: 42°21′N 47°34′E
- Country: Russia
- Region: Republic of Dagestan
- District: Sergokalinsky District
- Time zone: UTC+3:00

Aymaumakhi (Russian: Аймаумахи; Dargwa: ГӀяймаумахьи) is a rural locality (a selo) and the administrative centre of Aymaumakhinskoye Rural Settlement, Sergokalinsky District, Republic of Dagestan, Russia. Population: 256 (2010 census); 337 (2002 census); 272 (1989 Soviet census). There is 1 street.

== Geography ==
Aymaumakhi is located 22 km southwest of Sergokala (the district's administrative centre) by road. Chabazimakhi and Khabaymakhi are the nearest rural localities.

== Nationalities ==
Dargins live there.

== Famous residents ==
- Guseyn Azizov (Hero of Socialist Labor)
- Magomed Gamidov (People's poet of Dagestan)
