= Nizhneye Chugli =

Nizhneye Chugli Нижнее Чугли Гъокьияб Чӏугӏли
- Selo
- Location within Republic of Dagestan Location within Russia
- Coordinates: 42°27′N 47°17′E
- Country: Russia
- Region: Republic of Dagestan
- District: Levashinsky District
- Time zone: UTC+3:00

Nizhneye Chugli (Russian: Нижнее Чугли; Avar: Гъокьияб Чӏугӏли) is a rural locality (a selo) in Levashinsky District, Republic of Dagestan, Russia. The population was 1,532 as of 2010. There are 5 streets.

== Geography ==
Nizhneye Chugli is located 5 km northwest of Levashi (the district's administrative centre) by road, on the Nakhker river. Khakhita and Levashi are the nearest rural localities.

== Nationalities ==
Avars live there.
