= Nizhneye Mulebki =

Nizhneye Mulebki Нижнее Мулебки УбяхI Мулибкӏи
- Selo
- Location within Republic of Dagestan Location within Russia
- Coordinates: 42°19′N 47°34′E
- Country: Russia
- Region: Republic of Dagestan
- District: Sergokalinsky District
- Time zone: UTC+3:00

Nizhneye Mulebki (Russian: Нижнее Мулебки; Dargwa: УбяхI Мулибкӏи) is a rural locality (selo) and the administrative centre of Nizhnemulebkinsky Selsoviet, Sergokalinsky District, Republic of Dagestan, Russia. Population: 442 (2010 census); 666 (2002 census); 410 (1989 Soviet census). There is one street.

== Geography ==
Nizhneye Mulebki is located 27 km southwest of Sergokala (the district's administrative centre) by road, near the Khabkay River. Khantskarkamakhi and Kardamakhi are the nearest rural localities.

== Nationalities ==
The majority of its population is Dargin.
