= Burkhimakhi =

Burkhimakhi Бурхимахи БурхӀимахьи
- Selo
- Location within Republic of Dagestan Location within Russia
- Coordinates: 42°18′N 47°35′E
- Country: Russia
- Region: Republic of Dagestan
- District: Sergokalinsky District
- Time zone: UTC+3:00

Burkhimakhi (Russian: Бурхимахи; Dargwa: БурхӀимахьи) is a rural locality (a selo) in Nizhnemulebkinsky Selsoviet, Sergokalinsky District, Republic of Dagestan, Russia. Population: 129 (2010 census); 152 (2002 census); 76 (1989 Soviet census). There is 1 street.

== Geography ==
Burkhimakhi is located 28 km southwest of Sergokala (the district's administrative centre) by road. Bakhmakhi and Ullukimakhi are the nearest rural localities.

== Nationalities ==
Dargins live there.
