= Ayalakab =

Ayalakab Аялакаб ГӀяялахъяб
- Selo
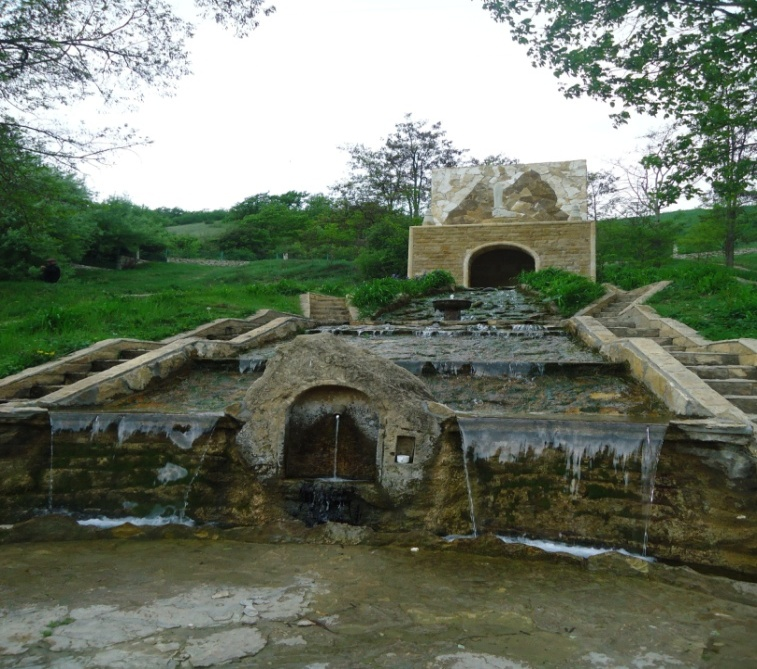
- A memorial monument to the highlanders who died in the battle was erected in the Aya-kaka gorge near the village of Ayalakab.

- Location within Republic of Dagestan Location within Russia
- Coordinates: 42°25′N 47°27′E
- Country: Russia
- Region: Republic of Dagestan
- District: Levashinsky District
- Time zone: UTC+3:00

Ayalakab (Russian: Аялакаб; Dargwa: ГӀяялахъяб) is a rural locality (a selo) and the administrative centre of Ayalakabsky Selsoviet, Levashinsky District, Republic of Dagestan, Russia. The population was 391 as of 2010. There are 8 streets.

== Geography ==
Ayalakab is located 19 km east of Levashi (the district's administrative centre) by road, on the Kakaozen River. Ayalakab and Purrimakhi are the nearest rural localities.

== Nationalities ==
Dargins live there.
