= Baltamakhi =

Baltamakhi Балтамахи Балтамахьи
- Selo
- Location within Republic of Dagestan Location within Russia
- Coordinates: 42°17′N 47°43′E
- Country: Russia
- Region: Republic of Dagestan
- District: Sergokalinsky District
- Time zone: UTC+3:00

Baltamakhi (Russian: Балтамахи; Dargwa: Балтамахьи) is a rural locality (a selo) in Kichi-Gamrinsky Rural Settlement, Sergokalinsky District, Republic of Dagestan, Russia. Population: 398 (2010 census); 495 (2002 census); 337 (1989 Soviet census). There is 1 street.

== Geography ==
Baltamakhi is located 32 km southeast of Sergokala (the district's administrative centre) by road. Kichi-Gamri and Mamaaul are the nearest rural localities.

== Nationalities ==
Dargins live there.
