= Miglakasimakhi =

Miglakasimakhi Миглакасимахи Миглакьасимахьи
- Selo
- Location within Republic of Dagestan Location within Russia
- Coordinates: 42°20′N 47°33′E
- Country: Russia
- Region: Republic of Dagestan
- District: Sergokalinsky District
- Time zone: UTC+3:00

Miglakasimakhi (Russian: Миглакасимахи; Dargwa: Миглакьасимахьи) is a rural locality (a selo) and the administrative centre of Miglakasimakhinsky Selsoviet, Sergokalinsky District, Republic of Dagestan, Russia. Population: 537 (2010 census); 519 (2002 census); 373 (1989 Soviet census). There is 1 street.

== Geography ==
Miglakasimakhi is located 25 km southwest of Sergokala (the district's administrative centre) by road. Kardamakhi and Kulkibekmakhi are the nearest rural localities.

== Nationalities ==
Dargins live there.
