= Kanasiragi =

Kanasiragi Канасираги Къянасирагьи
- Selo
- Location within Republic of Dagestan Location within Russia
- Coordinates: 42°15′N 47°38′E
- Country: Russia
- Region: Republic of Dagestan
- District: Sergokalinsky District
- Time zone: UTC+3:00

Kanasiragi (Russian: Канасираги; Dargwa: Къянасирагьи) is a rural locality (a selo) in Sergokalinsky District, Republic of Dagestan, Russia. Population: 472 (2021 census); 946 (2002 census); 644 (1989 Soviet census). There are 3 streets.

== Geography ==
Kanasiragi is located 34 km south of Sergokala (the district's administrative centre) by road. Mugri and Tsurai are the nearest rural localities.

== Nationalities ==
Dargins live there.

== Famous residents ==
- Muslimbek Kemtsurov (People's Artist of Dagestan, theater actor)
- Abdurazak Murtazaliyev (poet)
