= Kakamakhi, Levashinsky District, Republic of Dagestan =

Kakamakhi Какамахи Кьакьамахьи
- Selo
- Location within Republic of Dagestan Location within Russia
- Coordinates: 42°23′N 47°18′E
- Country: Russia
- Region: Republic of Dagestan
- District: Levashinsky District
- Time zone: UTC+3:00

Kakamakhi (Russian: Какамахи; Dargwa: Кьакьамахьи) is a rural locality (a selo) and the administrative centre of Kakamakhinsky Selsoviet, Levashinsky District, Republic of Dagestan, Russia. The population was 2,647 as of 2010. There are 9 streets.

== Geography ==
Kakamakhi is located 5 km southwest of Levashi (the district's administrative centre) by road, on the Khalagork River. Ditunshimakhi and Naskent are the nearest rural localities.

== Nationalities ==
Dargins live there.
