= Khabkaymakhi =

Rural locality in Aymaumakhinskoye Rural Settlement

Khabkaymakhi Хабкаймахи ХӀябкьяймахьи
- Selo
- Location within Republic of Dagestan Location within Russia
- Coordinates: 42°21′N 47°35′E
- Country: Russia
- Region: Republic of Dagestan
- District: Sergokalinsky District
- Time zone: UTC+3:00

Khabkaymakhi (Russian: Хабкаймахи; Dargwa: ХӀябкьяймахьи) is a rural locality (a selo) in Aymaumakhinskoye Rural Settlement, Sergokalinsky District, Republic of Dagestan, Russia. Population: 83 (2010 census); 286 (2002 census); 225 (1989 Soviet census). There is 1 street.

== Geography ==
Khabkaymakhi is located 20 km southwest of Sergokala (the district's administrative centre) by road. Aymaumakhi and Chabazimakhi are the nearest rural localities.

== Nationalities ==
Dargins live there.
