= Tarlimakhi =

Tarlimakhi Тарлимахи Тарлимахьи
- Selo
- Location within Republic of Dagestan Location within Russia
- Coordinates: 42°21′N 47°10′E
- Country: Russia
- Region: Republic of Dagestan
- District: Levashinsky District
- Time zone: UTC+3:00

Tarlimakhi (Russian: Тарлимахи; Dargwa: Тарлимахьи) is a rural locality (a selo) in Tsudakharsky Selsoviet, Levashinsky District, Republic of Dagestan, Russia. The population was 148 as of 2010. There are 3 streets.

== Geography ==
Tarlimakhi is located 26 km southwest of Levashi (the district's administrative centre) by road, on the Akusha and Kazikumukhskoye Koysu Rivers. Inkuchimakhi and Gurgumakhi are the nearest rural localities.

== Nationalities ==
Dargins live there.
