= Inkuchimakhi =

Inkuchimakhi Инкучимахи Инкъучимахьи
- Selo
- Location within Republic of Dagestan Location within Russia
- Coordinates: 42°20′N 47°10′E
- Country: Russia
- Region: Republic of Dagestan
- District: Levashinsky District
- Time zone: UTC+3:00

Inkuchimakhi (Russian: Инкучимахи; Dargwa: Инкъучимахьи) is a rural locality (a selo) in Tsudakharsky Selsoviet, Levashinsky District, Republic of Dagestan, Russia. The population was 537 as of 2010. There are 4 streets.

== Geography ==
Inkuchimakhi is located 26 km southwest of Levashi (the district's administrative centre) by road, on the Kazikumukhskoye Koysu River. Kumamakhi and Tsudakhar are the nearest rural localities.

== Nationalities ==
Dargins live there.
