= Verkhny Ubekimakhi =

Verkhny Ubekimakhi Верхний Убекимахи ЧебяхӀ Убекимахьи
- Selo
- Location within Republic of Dagestan Location within Russia
- Coordinates: 42°22′N 47°14′E
- Country: Russia
- Region: Republic of Dagestan
- District: Levashinsky District
- Time zone: UTC+3:00

Verkhny Ubekimakhi (Russian: Верхний Убекимахи; Dargwa: ЧебяхӀ Убекимахьи) is a rural locality (a selo) and the administrative centre of Verkhne-Ubekimakhinsky Selsoviet, Levashinsky District, Republic of Dagestan, Russia. The population was 842 as of 2010. There are 7 streets.

== Geography ==
Verkhny Ubekimakhi is located 27 km southwest of Levashi (the district's administrative centre) by road, on the Barchuma River. Guladtymakhi and Ditunshimakhi are the nearest rural localities.

== Nationalities ==
Dargins live there.
