= Ebdalaya =

Ebdalaya Эбдалая ЭбдалгӀяя
- Selo
- Location within Republic of Dagestan Location within Russia
- Coordinates: 42°22′N 47°20′E
- Country: Russia
- Region: Republic of Dagestan
- District: Levashinsky District
- Time zone: UTC+3:00

Ebdalaya (Russian: Эбдалая; Dargwa: ЭбдалгӀяя) is a rural locality (a selo) and the administrative centre of Ebdalayansky Selsoviet, Levashinsky District, Republic of Dagestan, Russia. The population was 811 as of 2010. There are 18 streets.

== Geography ==
Ebdalaya is located 8 km southeast of Levashi (the district's administrative centre) by road, on the Khalagork and Tashkapurkherk River. Barkhakent and Khasakent are the nearest rural localities.

== Nationalities ==
Dargins live there.
