= Vanashimakhi, Sergokalinsky District, Republic of Dagestan =

Vanashimakhi Ванашимахи Ванашимахьи
- Selo
- Location within Republic of Dagestan Location within Russia
- Coordinates: 42°24′N 47°36′E
- Country: Russia
- Region: Republic of Dagestan
- District: Sergokalinsky District
- Time zone: UTC+3:00

Vanashimakhi (Russian: Ванашимахи; Dargwa: Ванашимахьи) is a rural locality (a selo) and the administrative centre of Vanashimakhinskoye Rural Settlement, Sergokalinsky District, Republic of Dagestan, Russia. Population: 813 (2021 census); 1,025 (2002 census); 550 (1989 Soviet census).

== Geography ==
Vanashimakhi is located 7 km southwest of Sergokala (the district's administrative centre) by road. Ayalizimakhi and Degva are the nearest rural localities.

== Nationalities ==
Dargins live there.

== Famous residents ==
- Rashid Rashidov (People's poet of Dagestan)
- Avadzi Omarov (Chairman of the Supreme Court of the DASSR)
