= Naskent =

Naskent Наскент Няскунт
- Selo
- Location within Republic of Dagestan Location within Russia
- Coordinates: 42°22′N 47°20′E
- Country: Russia
- Region: Republic of Dagestan
- District: Levashinsky District
- Time zone: UTC+3:00

Naskent (Russian: Наскент; Dargwa: Няскунт) is a rural locality (a selo) in Levashinsky District, Republic of Dagestan, Russia. The population was 2,949 as of 2010. There are 39 streets.

== Geography ==
Naskent is located 8 km south of Levashi (the district's administrative centre) by road. Khasakent and Ebdalaya are the nearest rural localities.

== Nationalities ==
Dargins live there.
