= Novoye Mugri =

Novoye Mugri Новое Мугри Сагаси Мугри
- Selo
- Location within Republic of Dagestan Location within Russia
- Coordinates: 42°28′N 47°45′E
- Country: Russia
- Region: Republic of Dagestan
- District: Sergokalinsky District
- Time zone: UTC+3:00

Novoye Mugri (Russian: Новое Мугри; Dargwa: Сагаси Мугри) is a rural locality (a selo) and the administrative centre of Novomugrinsky Selsoviet, Sergokalinsky District, Republic of Dagestan, Russia. Population: 353 (2021 census); 630 (2002 census); 553 (1989 Soviet census). There is 1 street.

== Geography ==
Novoye Mugri is located 14 km northeast of Sergokala (the district's administrative centre) by road. Leninkent, Utamysh and Myurego are the nearest rural localities.

== Nationalities ==
Dargins live there.
