= Kadirkent =

Kadirkent Кадиркент Кьадиркент
- Selo
- Location within Republic of Dagestan Location within Russia
- Coordinates: 42°29′N 47°36′E
- Country: Russia
- Region: Republic of Dagestan
- District: Sergokalinsky District
- Time zone: UTC+3:00

Kadirkent (Russian: Кадиркент; Dargwa: Кьадиркент) is a rural locality (a selo) in Sergokalinsky Selsoviet, Sergokalinsky District, Republic of Dagestan, Russia. Population: 644 (2021 census); 859 (2002 census); 352 (1989 Soviet census). There are 9 streets. The population consists of mainly Dargins.

== Geography ==
Kadirkent is located 8 km northwest of Sergokala (the district's administrative centre) by road. Gubden and Sergokala are the nearest rural localities.
