= Nizhny Arshi =

Nizhny Arshi Нижний Арши УбяхӀ ГӀярши
- Selo
- Location within Republic of Dagestan Location within Russia
- Coordinates: 42°23′N 47°08′E
- Country: Russia
- Region: Republic of Dagestan
- District: Levashinsky District
- Time zone: UTC+3:00

Nizhny Arshi (Russian: Нижний Арши; Dargwa: УбяхӀ ГӀярши) is a rural locality (a selo) in Arshimakhinsky Selsoviet, Levashinsky District, Republic of Dagestan, Russia. The population was 548 in 2010. There are eight streets.

== Geography ==
Nizhny Arshi is 26 km southwest of Levashi, the administrative center of the district, by road. Verkhniye Arshi and Khadzhalte are the closest rural localities.

== Nationalities ==
Dargins live in the village.
