= Nizhneye Labkomakhi =

Nizhneye Labkomakhi Нижнее Лабкомахи УбяхӀ Лябхъумахьи
- Selo
- Location within Republic of Dagestan Location within Russia
- Coordinates: 42°21′N 47°25′E
- Country: Russia
- Region: Republic of Dagestan
- District: Levashinsky District
- Time zone: UTC+3:00

Nizhneye Labkomakhi (Russian: Нижнее Лабкомахи; Dargwa: УбяхӀ Лябхъумахьи) is a rural locality (a selo) in Verkhne-Labkomakhinsky Selsoviet, Levashinsky District, Republic of Dagestan, Russia. The population was 365 as of 2010. There are 13 streets.

== Geography ==
Nizhneye Labkomakhi is located 22 km southeast of Levashi (the district's administrative centre) by road, on the Khalagork River. Verkhneye Labkomakhi and Karlabko are the nearest rural localities.

== Nationalities ==
Dargins live there.
