= Aynikab =

Aynikab Айникаб ГӀяйнихъяб
- Selo
- Location within Republic of Dagestan Location within Russia
- Coordinates: 42°22′N 47°12′E
- Country: Russia
- Region: Republic of Dagestan
- District: Levashinsky District
- Time zone: UTC+3:00

Aynikab (Russian: Айникаб; Dargwa: ГӀяйнихъяб) is a rural locality (a selo) in Verkhne-Ubekimakhinsky Selsoviet, Levashinsky District, Republic of Dagestan, Russia. The population was 103 as of 2010. There are 3 streets.

== Geography ==
Aynikab is located 30 km southwest of Levashi (the district's administrative centre) by road. Musultemakhi and Kumamakhi are the nearest rural localities.

== Nationalities ==
Dargins live there.
