= Verkhneye Labkomakhi =

Verkhneye Labkomakhi Верхнее Лабкомахи ЧебяхӀ Лябхъумахьи
- Selo
- Location within Republic of Dagestan Location within Russia
- Coordinates: 42°20′N 47°26′E
- Country: Russia
- Region: Republic of Dagestan
- District: Levashinsky District
- Time zone: UTC+3:00

Verkhneye Labkomakhi (Russian: Верхнее Лабкомахи; Dargwa: ЧебяхӀ Лябхъумахьи) is a rural locality (a selo) and the administrative centre of Verkhne-Labkomakhinsky Selsoviet, Levashinsky District, Republic of Dagestan, Russia. The population was 741 as of 2010. There are 22 streets.

== Geography ==
Verkhneye Labkomakhi is located 19 km southeast of Levashi (the district's administrative centre) by road, on the Khalagork River. Sangimakhi and Nizhneye Labkomakhi are the nearest rural localities.

== Nationalities ==
Dargins live there.
