= Ayalizimakhi =

Ayalizimakhi Аялизимахи ГӀяялизимахьи
- Selo
- Location within Republic of Dagestan Location within Russia
- Coordinates: 42°22′N 47°36′E
- Country: Russia
- Region: Republic of Dagestan
- District: Sergokalinsky District
- Time zone: UTC+3:00

Ayalizimakhi (Russian: Аялизимахи; Dargwa: ГӀяялизимахьи) is a rural locality (a selo) in Sergokalinsky District, Republic of Dagestan, Russia. Population: 433 (2021 census); 834 (2002 census); 454 (1989 Soviet census). There is 1 street.

== Geography ==
Ayalizimakhi is located 13 km southwest of Sergokala (the district's administrative centre) by road. Vanashimakhi and Aymaumakhi are the nearest rural localities.
