= Tsukhta =

Tsukhta Цухта Цlухта
- Selo
- Location within Republic of Dagestan Location within Russia
- Coordinates: 42°20′N 47°20′E
- Country: Russia
- Region: Republic of Dagestan
- District: Levashinsky District
- Time zone: UTC+3:00

Tsukhta (Russian: Цухта; Dargwa: Цlухта) is a rural locality (a selo) in Levashinsky District, Republic of Dagestan, Russia. The population was 1,558 as of 2010. There are 9 streets.

== Geography ==
Tsukhta is located 15 km south of Levashi (the district's administrative centre) by road. Chuni and Barkhakent are the nearest rural localities.

== Nationalities ==
Dargins live there.
