= Nurbagand Nurbagandov =

Russian politician

- Нурбаганд Нурбагандов
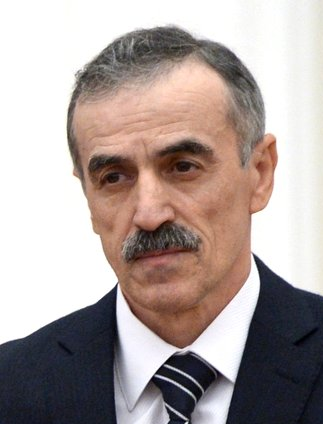

Deputy of the 8th State Duma
- Incumbent
- Assumed office 19 September 2021

Deputy of the 7th State Duma
- In office 5 October 2016 – 12 October 2021

Personal details
- Born: 19 March 1957 (age 69) Urakhi, Sergokalinsky District, Dagestan Autonomous Soviet Socialist Republic, USSR
- Party: United Russia
- Education: Dagestan State Pedagogical University

Nurbagand Nurbagandov (Russian: Нурбаганд Магомедович Нурбагандов; born 19 March 1957, Urakhi, Dakhadayevsky District) is a Russian political figure and a deputy of the 8th State Duma.

From 1990 to 2008, Nurbagandov held the positions of the chief state tax inspector, head of the department of taxation of individuals, head of the department in the state tax inspectorate for the Sergokalinsky District of Dagestan. In 2008-2015, he headed the branch of the Russian Agricultural Bank. Since September 2021, he has served as the deputy of the 8th State Duma.

He is the father of the Hero of the Russian Federation, Magomed Nurbagandov, who was killed by the Islamic State militants in 2016.

== Sanctions ==
On 24 March 2022, the United States Treasury sanctioned him in response to the 2022 Russian invasion of Ukraine.

He was sanctioned by the UK government in 2022 in relation to the Russo-Ukrainian War.
