= Karekadani =

Karekadani Карекадани Кьаракьядани
- Selo
- Location within Republic of Dagestan Location within Russia
- Coordinates: 42°21′N 47°07′E
- Country: Russia
- Region: Republic of Dagestan
- District: Levashinsky District
- Time zone: UTC+3:00

Karekadani (Russian: Карекадани; Dargwa: Кьаракьядани) is a rural locality (a selo) in Tsudakharsky Selsoviet, Levashinsky District, Republic of Dagestan, Russia. The population was 727 as of 2010. There are 4 streets.

== Geography ==
Karekadani is located 31 km southwest of Levashi (the district's administrative centre) by road. Burtanimakhi and Karekadani are the nearest rural localities.

== Nationalities ==
Dargins live there.
