= Tarlankak =

Tarlankak Тарланкак Тарланкьякь
- Selo
- Location within Republic of Dagestan Location within Russia
- Coordinates: 42°23′N 47°28′E
- Country: Russia
- Region: Republic of Dagestan
- District: Levashinsky District
- Time zone: UTC+3:00

Tarlankak (Russian: Тарланкак; Dargwa: Тарланкьякь) is a rural locality (a selo) in Mekeginsky Selsoviet, Levashinsky District, Republic of Dagestan, Russia. The population was 28 as of 2010. There are 6 streets.

== Geography ==
Tarlankak is located 20 km southeast of Levashi (the district's administrative centre) by road, on the Kaprakh River. Mekegi and Aylakab are the nearest rural localities.

== Nationalities ==
Dargins live there.
