= Akhkent =

Akhkent Ахкент Хъахӏаб-росу
- Selo
- Location within Republic of Dagestan Location within Russia
- Coordinates: 42°34′N 47°11′E
- Country: Russia
- Region: Republic of Dagestan
- District: Levashinsky District
- Time zone: UTC+3:00

Akhkent (Russian: Ахкент; Avar: Хъахӏаб-росу) is a rural locality (a selo) in Levashinsky District, Republic of Dagestan, Russia. The population was 301 as of 2010. There are 6 streets.

== Geography ==
Akhkent is located 26 km northwest of Levashi (the district's administrative centre) by road. Okhli and Kuletsma are the nearest rural localities.

== Nationalities ==
Avar.
