= Zurilaudimakhi =

Zurilaudimakhi Зурилаудимахи Зурилаудимахьи
- Selo
- Location within Republic of Dagestan Location within Russia
- Coordinates: 42°25′N 47°29′E
- Country: Russia
- Region: Republic of Dagestan
- District: Levashinsky District
- Time zone: UTC+3:00

Zurilaudimakhi (Russian: Зурилаудимахи; Dargwa: Зурилаудимахьи) is a rural locality (a selo) in Ayalakabsky Selsoviet, Levashinsky District, Republic of Dagestan, Russia. The population was 462 as of 2010. There are 7 streets.

== Geography ==
Zurilaudimakhi is located 22 km west of Levashi (the district's administrative centre) by road, on the Kakaozen River. Shikshakak and Damkulakada are the nearest rural localities.

== Nationalities ==
Dargins live there.
