= Degva =

Degva Дегва
- Selo
- Location within Republic of Dagestan Location within Russia
- Coordinates: 42°24′N 47°32′E
- Country: Russia
- Region: Republic of Dagestan
- District: Sergokalinsky District
- Time zone: UTC+3:00

Degva (Russian: Дегва) is a rural locality (a selo) in Sergokalinsky District, Republic of Dagestan, Russia. Population: 629 (2021 census); 1,324 (2002 census); 542 (1989 Soviet census). There is 1 street.

== Geography ==
Degva is located 15 km southwest of Sergokala (the district's administrative centre) by road, on the Kakaozen river. Chakhimakhi and Aymazamakhi are the nearest rural localities.

== Nationalities ==
Dargins live there.
