= Aynurbimakhi =

Aynurbimakhi Айнурбимахи ГӀяйнурбимахьи
- Selo
- Location within Republic of Dagestan Location within Russia
- Coordinates: 42°17′N 47°35′E
- Country: Russia
- Region: Republic of Dagestan
- District: Sergokalinsky District
- Time zone: UTC+3:00

Aynurbimakhi (Russian: Айнурбимахи; Dargwa: ГӀяйнурбимахьи) is a rural locality (a selo) in Nizhnemulebkinsky Selsoviet, Sergokalinsky District, Republic of Dagestan, Russia. Population: 290 (2010 census); 288 (2002 census); 218 (1989 Soviet census). There is 1 street.

== Geography ==
Aynurbimakhi is located 32 km south of Sergokala (the district's administrative centre) by road, on the Garmiozen river. Burkhimakhi and Bakhmakhi are the nearest rural localities.

== Nationalities ==
Dargins live there.
