= Khasakent =

Khasakent Хасакент ХӀясакент
- Selo
- Location within Republic of Dagestan Location within Russia
- Coordinates: 42°22′N 47°20′E
- Country: Russia
- Region: Republic of Dagestan
- District: Levashinsky District
- Time zone: UTC+3:00

Khasakent (Russian: Хасакент; Dargwa: ХӀясакент) is a rural locality (a selo) in Ebdalayansky Selsoviet, Levashinsky District, Republic of Dagestan, Russia. The population was 432 as of 2010. There are 17 streets.

== Geography ==
Khasakent is located 8 km southeast of Levashi (the district's administrative centre) by road. Naskent and Ebdalaya are the nearest rural localities.

== Nationalities ==
Dargins live there.
