= Khakhita =

Khakhita Хахита Хахитӏа
- Selo
- Location within Republic of Dagestan Location within Russia
- Coordinates: 42°27′N 47°16′E
- Country: Russia
- Region: Republic of Dagestan
- District: Levashinsky District
- Time zone: UTC+3:00

Khakhita (Russian: Хахита; Avar: Хахитӏа) is a rural locality (a selo) in Levashinsky District, Republic of Dagestan, Russia. The population was 1,165 as of 2010. There are 13 streets.

== Geography ==
Khakhita is located 8 km northwest of Levashi (the district's administrative centre) by road. Nizhneye Chugli and Orada Chugli are the nearest rural localities.

== Nationalities ==
Avars live there.
