= Verkhny Arshi =

Verkhny Arshi Верхний Арши ЧебяхӀ ГӀярши
- Selo
- Location within Republic of Dagestan Location within Russia
- Coordinates: 42°24′N 47°07′E
- Country: Russia
- Region: Republic of Dagestan
- District: Levashinsky District
- Time zone: UTC+3:00

Verkhny Arshi (Russian: Верхний Арши; Dargwa: ЧебяхӀ ГӀярши) is a rural locality (a selo) and the administrative centre of Arshimakhinsky Selsoviet, Levashinsky District, Republic of Dagestan, Russia. The population was 994 as of 2010. There are 12 streets.

== Geography ==
Verkhny Arshi is located 24 km west of Levashi (the district's administrative centre) by road. Nizhniye Arshi and Kundurkhe are the nearest rural localities.

== Nationalities ==
Dargins live there.
