= Chabazimakhi =

Chabazimakhi Чабазимахи Чабазимахьи
- Selo
- Location within Republic of Dagestan Location within Russia
- Coordinates: 42°21′N 47°34′E
- Country: Russia
- Region: Republic of Dagestan
- District: Sergokalinsky District
- Time zone: UTC+3:00

Chabazimakhi (Russian: Чабазимахи; Dargwa: Чабазимахьи) is a rural locality (a selo) in Aymaumakhinskoye Rural Settlement, Sergokalinsky District, Republic of Dagestan, Russia. Population: 182 (2010 census); 197 (2002 census); 50 (1989 Soviet census). There is 1 street.

== Geography ==
Chabazimakhi is located 22 km southwest of Sergokala (the district's administrative centre) by road. Aymaumakhi and Miglakasimakhi are the nearest rural localities.

== Nationalities ==
Dargins live there.
