= Karlabko =

Karlabko Карлабко
- Selo
- Location within Republic of Dagestan Location within Russia
- Coordinates: 42°21′N 47°23′E
- Country: Russia
- Region: Republic of Dagestan
- District: Levashinsky District
- Time zone: UTC+3:00

Karlabko (Russian: Карлабко) is a rural locality (a selo) and the administrative centre of Karlabkinsky Selsoviet, Levashinsky District, Republic of Dagestan, Russia. The population was 2,684 as of 2010. There are 26 streets.

== Geography ==
Karlabko is located 16 km southeast of Levashi (the district's administrative centre) by road, on the Khalagork River. Suleybakent and Nizhniye Labkomakhi are the nearest rural localities.
