= Kutisha =

Kutisha Кутиша
- Selo
- Location within Republic of Dagestan Location within Russia
- Coordinates: 42°25′N 47°16′E
- Country: Russia
- Region: Republic of Dagestan
- District: Levashinsky District
- Time zone: UTC+3:00

Kutisha (Russian: Кутиша) is a rural locality (a selo) in Levashinsky District, Republic of Dagestan, Russia. The population was 1,922 as of 2010. There are 22 streets.

== Geography ==
Kutisha is located 6 km west of Levashi (the district's administrative centre) by road. Levashi and Kakamakhi are the nearest rural localities.

== Nationalities ==
Avars live there.
