= Gamid =

Gamid is a given name. Notable people with the given name include:

- Gamid Agalarov (born 2000), Russian football player
- Gamid Gamidov (1954-1996), Russian politician
