= Dagestan State Pedagogical Institute =

Dagestan State Pedagogical Institute:

- Dagestan State Pedagogical Institute, the name of Dagestan State University in 1931-1957.
- Dagestan State Pedagogical Institute, the name of Dagestan State Pedagogical University in 1964-1994.
