= Dzhamaladin Gasanov =

Russian politician (born 1964)

- Джамаладин Гасанов
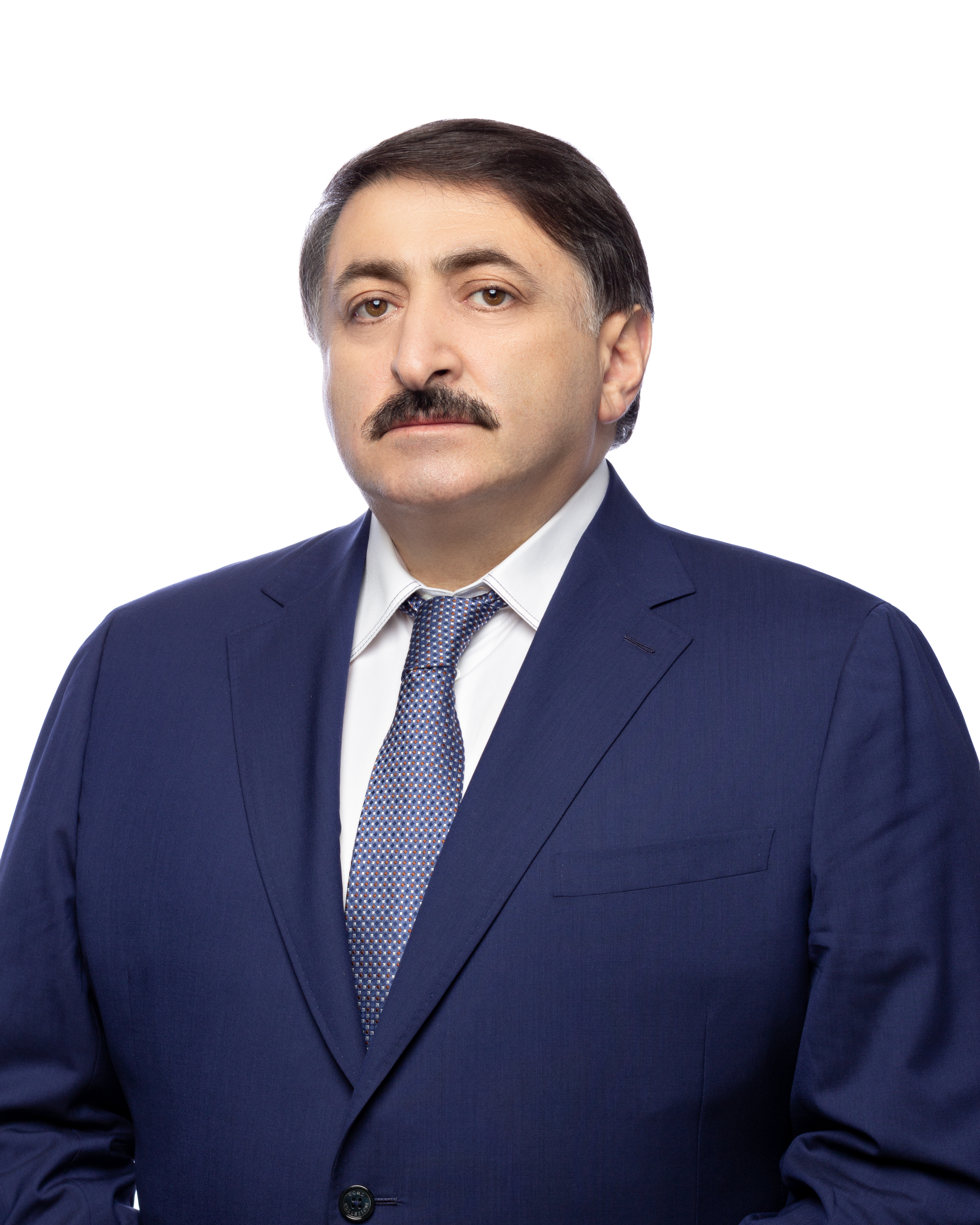

Member of the State Duma for Dagestan
- Incumbent
- Assumed office 12 October 2021
- Preceded by: Abdulmazhid Magramov
- Constituency: Southern Dagestan (No. 12)

Member of the State Duma (Party List Seat)
- In office 24 December 2007 – 5 October 2016

Personal details
- Born: 5 August 1964 (age 61) Levashi, Dagestan ASSR, RSFSR, USSR
- Party: United Russia; LDPR (before 2016)
- Education: Stavropol State Agrarian University (D.Sc.)

Dzhamaladin Nabievich Gasanov (Russian: Джамаладин Набиевич Гасанов; born 5 August 1964) is a Russian political figure and deputy of the 5th, 6th, and 8th State Dumas. In 2021, he was granted a Doctor of Sciences in Political Science degree

In 1994, he was appointed assistant to the Prime Minister of the Stavropol Krai. In 1999, he became an adviser on economic issues, then deputy plenipotentiary representative of the President of the Russian Federation in the Stavropol Territory. In 2004, he became the Head of the Inspectorate for Control over Non-Tax Revenues and Sources of Internal Financing of the Accounts Chamber of Russia. In 2007, he was elected deputy of the Duma of Stavropol Krai of the 4th convocation. The same year he was elected deputy of the 5th State Duma; he ran with the Liberal Democratic Party of Russia. From 2016 to 2019, he was Assistant to Deputy Chairman of the Federation Council Ilyas Umakhanov. In March 2019, he was appointed Permanent Representative of the Republic of Dagestan to the President of the Russian Federation. Since September 2021, he has served as a deputy of the 8th State Duma.
