= Work, brothers! =

Russian aphorism

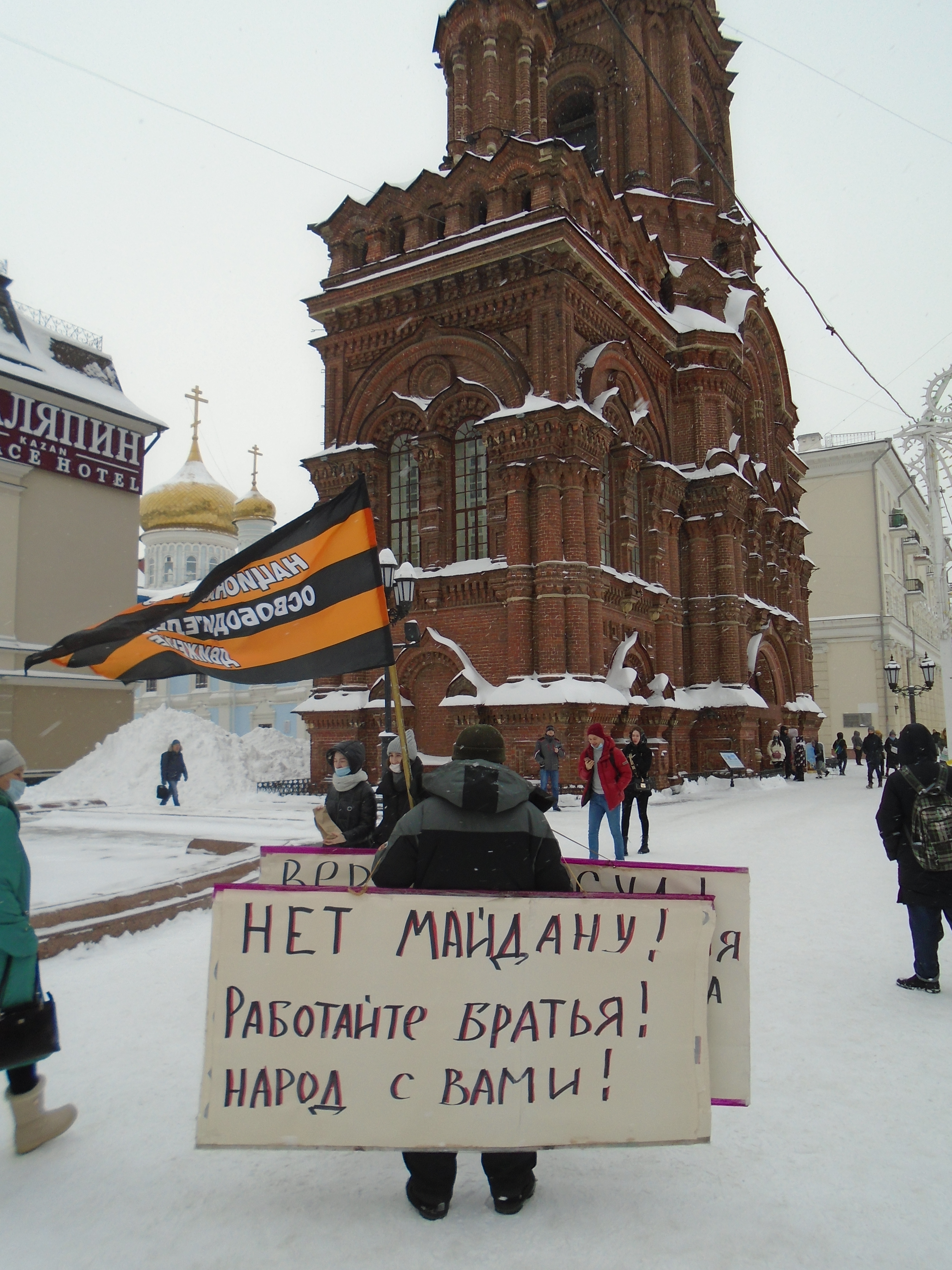
Single picketer for NLM in Kazan, during the 2021 Russian protests, holding a sign with the phrase.

"Work, brothers!" (Russian: Работайте, братья!) is a popular folk, colloquial catchphrase in Russian and an aphorism. The phrase was first uttered by Police Lieutenant Magomed Nurbagandov just before he was shot by militants. The phrase became popular after it was published on the Internet on September 12, 2016.

Since its publication, the phrase has often been heard on state radio and television, used in the media, publicly delivered speeches, in a documentary of the same name, appeals, reports and campaigns. Thus the process of becoming a phrase took place.

== History ==
Police Lieutenant Magomed Nurbagandov, who was vacationing with his family near the village Sergokala in the Republic of Dagestan, was attacked by five armed militants in a tent on the morning of July 10, 2016. Having learned that Nurbagandov was a policeman, the militants pushed him and his brother into the trunk of a car stolen from a taxi driver, drove him away from the recreation area, and then shot him. Nurbagandov's murder was filmed on a mobile phone and posted on an extremist website.

Several militants from this group were killed in September 2016, and two were detained. When examining the bodies of the dead, the mobile phone that had filmed the video was found. It became clear that the militants had uploaded an edited version of the video where they cut out Nurbagandov's last words. Before the murder, Magomed was forced on camera to call on his colleagues to leave work, but instead he said "Work, brothers! (Работайте, братья!).

In the fall of 2016, activists of public organizations and law enforcement officers held rallies in many regions of Russia. They took to the streets with signs “We are working, brother!” The same words were placed on banners and cars.

== Linguistic analysis ==
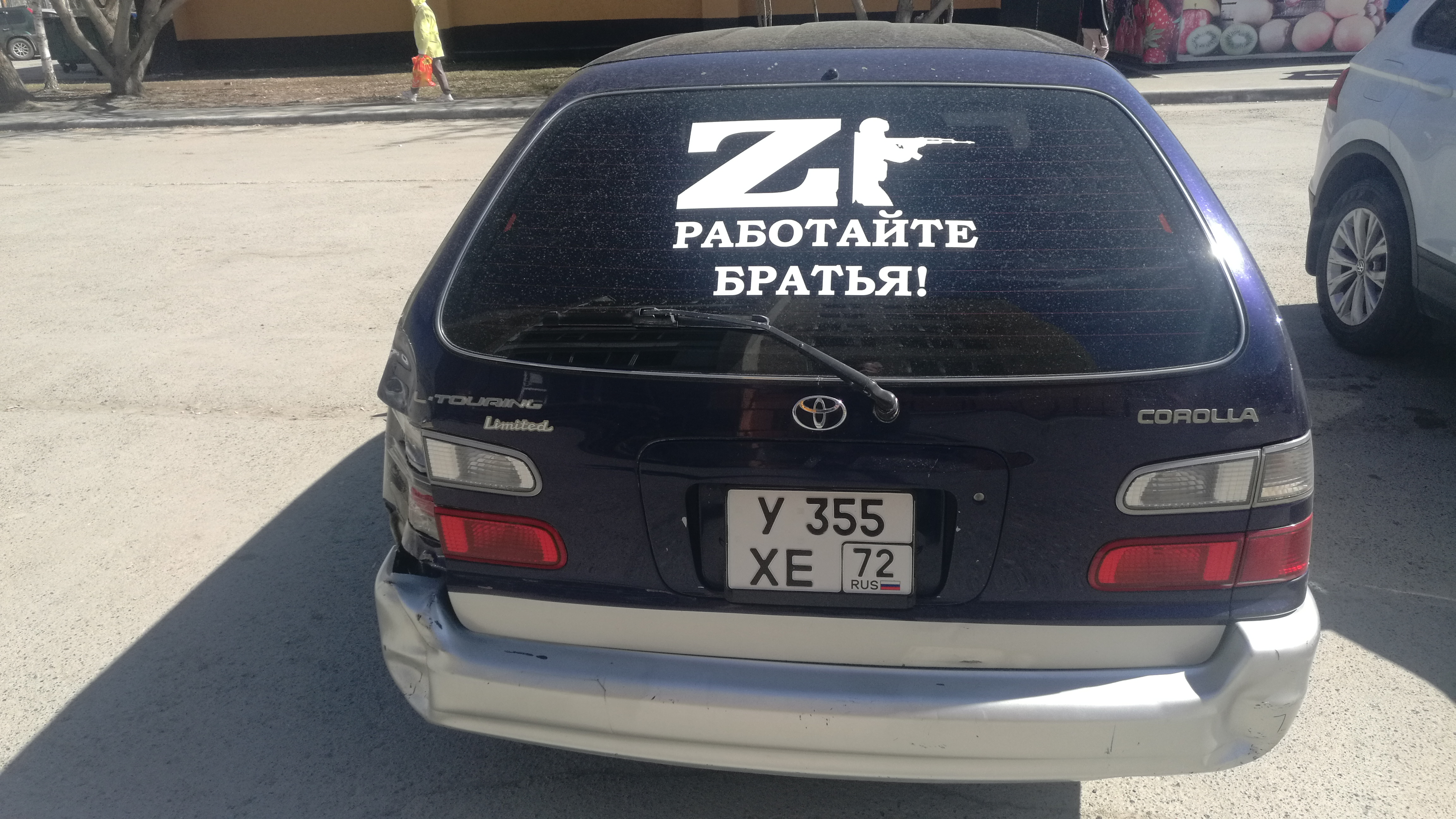
Decal on a car supporting the Russian invasion of Ukraine in Tyumen.

Doctor of Philology, Professor Zamir Tarlanov writes, that since the publication of the phrase and its frequent use in the media, the process of phraseologisation began, with the simultaneous transformation into an aphorism, and catchphrase. This process is expressed in the fact that the phrase “Work, brothers!” has acquired new meanings that have changed its linguistic status.

In the professional terminology of law enforcement agencies like Siloviks, the verb "to work" (работать) is used as a generic word, acting as a hypernym. The order "We work!" (Работаем!) acts as a signal to start a mission. Thus, the word's meaning has been rethought as “destroy the bandits.”

Tarlanov points out that “this aphorism reproduces and reinforces the absolute unemotionality, emotional neutrality of the original phrase as one of its important features, although it is built on the imperative; the unpretentiousness of the phrase is amazing, it naturally turns into an aphorism."

== In society ==
- The phrase "Work, brothers!" became the unofficial motto of Russian law enforcement officers.
- In November of 2016, with participation from the Ministry of Internal Affairs, the Ministry of Defense and the Military Historical and Cultural Center, the prize "Work Brothers! (Работайте, братья), named after Hero of Russia recipient Magomed Nurbagandov, was established at the International Festival of National Unity called "White Cranes of Russia."
- During the protests in support of Alexei Navalny in 2021, the phrase was used to express support of the actions of OMON by various Russian statesmen, public figures, and by opponents of the protests. Margarita Simonyan praised the work of the security forces on Twitter, writing: "Minus one woman with a concussion, but still a win for a huge country! This deserves an individual thank you. Work, brothers." (The woman she was referring to was Margarita Yudina, who was kicked by a security officer and hospitalized during the protests).
- Similarly, the phrase was used during the protests in Belarus in the state media to show support for the security forces. The phrase was also used by a protester outside the Belarusian Embassy in Moscow.
- In 2022 during the Russian invasion of Ukraine, the phrase is used on social media and in mass media as a sign of support for Russian army. Ivan Okhlobystin launched a flash mob with the same name.
- The phrase was used by the Russian soldiers who beheaded a Ukrainian prisoner of war in summer 2022.

=== In literature ===
- In 2017, the White Cranes of Russia educational project, with the support of the Peter the Great National Fund for Cultural Innovation and the National Fund for the Support of Copyright Holders, with the Russian poet Sergei Sokolkin published an anthology of the phrase. The presentation of the first edition took place in early 2018 in Russia, later presentations also took place in the DNR and the LPR. As of February 2020, three editions of the anthology have been released.

=== In music ===
- In 2019, the rock group Piligrim released the single "Work, brothers" (in memory of the Hero of Russia Magomed Nurbagandov)

== Literature ==
- Тарланов З. К. «Работайте, братья»: о зарождении афоризма как нового языкового факта // Русский язык в школе : научно-методический журнал. — 2017. — № 1. — С. 52–54. — ISSN 0131-6141
- Работайте, братья! Последняя фраза Героя России лейтенанта полиции Магомеда Нурбагандова за считанные дни стала крылатой // Щит и меч, газета Министерства внутренних дел России, № 37 (1533). — 29 сентября 2016.
- Гуськов Антон. «Работайте, братья!»: как два слова изменили жизнь дагестанцев (ВИДЕО) // Европейско-Азиатские новости, 10 ноября 2020
- Соколкин С. Ю. «Работайте, братья!»: Антология современной патриотической и военной песни России. — М.: Национальный фонд культурных инноваций «Петр Великий», 2017. — 628 с. — ISBN 978-5-9500647-0-8
