= Purrimakhi =

Purrimakhi Пурримахи Пуррамахьи
- Selo
- Location within Republic of Dagestan Location within Russia
- Coordinates: 42°25′N 47°27′E
- Country: Russia
- Region: Republic of Dagestan
- District: Levashinsky District
- Time zone: UTC+3:00

Purrimakhi (Russian: Пурримахи; Dargwa: Пуррамахьи) is a rural locality (a selo) in Ayalakabsky Selsoviet, Levashinsky District, Republic of Dagestan, Russia. The population was 76 as of 2010. There are 2 streets.

== Geography ==
It is located 13 km east of Levashi, on the Kakaozen River.

== Nationalities ==
Dargins live there.
