= Southern constituency =

Southern constituency may refer to:

- Southern constituency (Dagestan)
- Southern constituency (Rostov Oblast)
- Southern constituency (Saint Petersburg)
- Edinburgh Southern (Scottish Parliament constituency)

== See also ==
- Southorn (constituency)
