= Kundurkhe =

Kundurkhe Кундурхе Кундурхи
- Selo
- Location within Republic of Dagestan Location within Russia
- Coordinates: 42°24′N 47°07′E
- Country: Russia
- Region: Republic of Dagestan
- District: Levashinsky District
- Time zone: UTC+3:00

Kundurkhe (Russian: Кундурхе; Dargwa: Кундурхи) is a rural locality (a selo) in Kuppinsky Selsoviet, Levashinsky District, Republic of Dagestan, Russia. The population was 375 as of 2010. There are 4 streets.

== Geography ==
It is located 16 km west of Levashi.

== Nationalities ==
Dargins live there.
