= Elakatmakhi =

Elakatmakhi Элакатмахи ГӀелакатмахьи
- Selo
- Location within Republic of Dagestan Location within Russia
- Coordinates: 42°27′N 47°23′E
- Country: Russia
- Region: Republic of Dagestan
- District: Levashinsky District
- Time zone: UTC+3:00

Elakatmakhi (Russian: Элакатмахи; Dargwa: ГӀелакатмахьи) is a rural locality (a selo) in Dzhangamakhinsky Selsoviet, Levashinsky District, Republic of Dagestan, Russia. The population was 74 as of 2010. There are 3 streets.

== Geography ==
It is located 7 km northeast of Levashi.

== Nationalities ==
Dargins live there.
