= Orada Chugli =

Orada Chugli Орада Чугли Тӏарада Чӏугӏли
- Selo
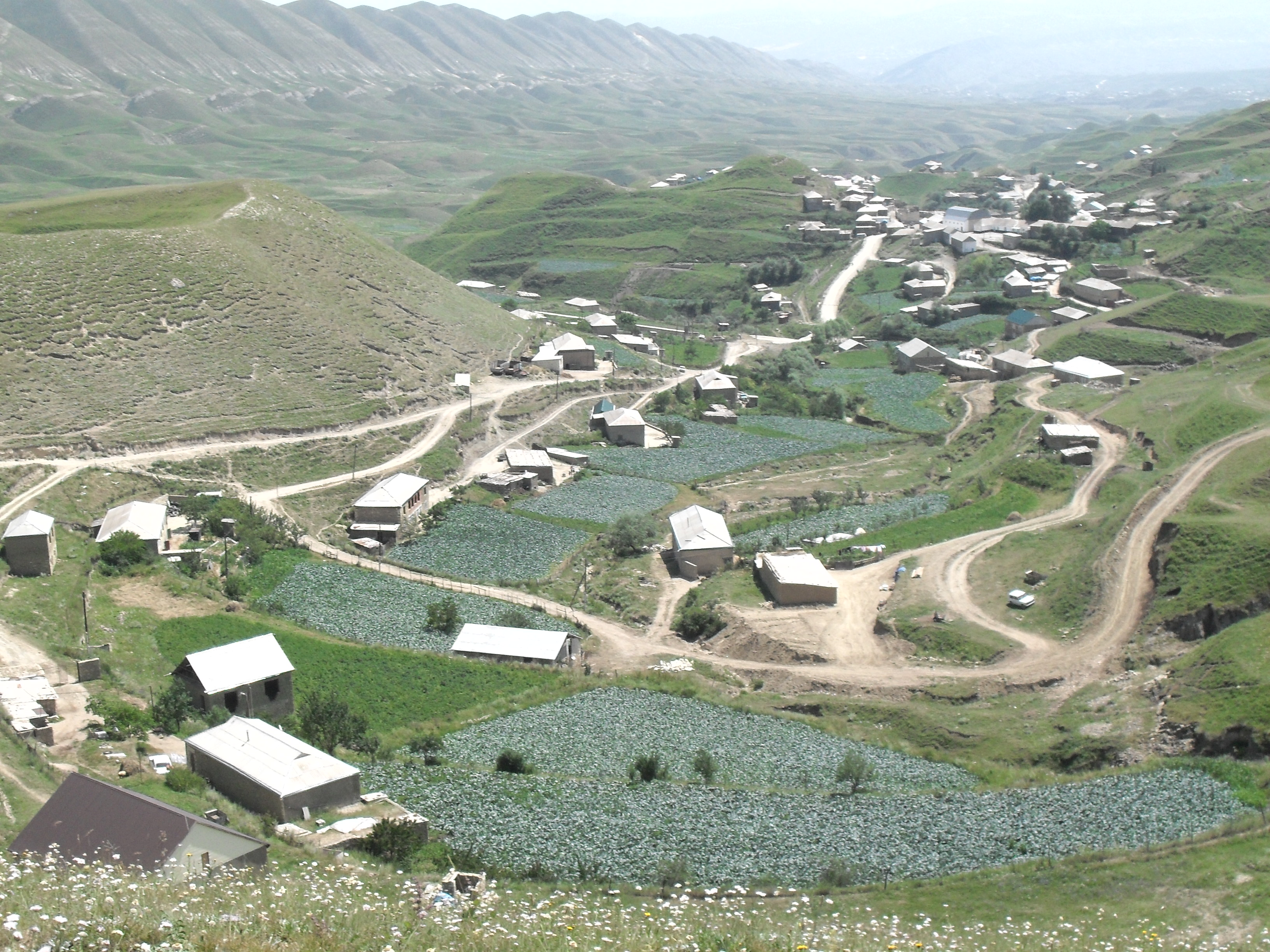
- Orada Chugli, Levashinsky District, Republic of Dagestan, Russia

- Location within Republic of Dagestan Location within Russia
- Coordinates: 42°29′N 47°13′E
- Country: Russia
- Region: Republic of Dagestan
- District: Levashinsky District
- Time zone: UTC+3:00

Orada Chugli (Russian: Орада Чугли; Avar: Тӏарада Чӏугӏли) is a rural locality (a selo) in Levashinsky District, Republic of Dagestan, Russia. The population was 981 as of 2010. There are 7 streets.

== Geography ==
Orada Chugli is located 13 km northwest of Levashi (the district's administrative centre) by road. Khakhita and Urma are the nearest rural localities.

== Nationalities ==
Avars live there.

== Famous residents ==
- Magomed Nurutdinov (European boxing champion)
