= Buanzimakhi =

Buanzimakhi Буанзимахи БургӀянзимахьи
- Selo
- Location within Republic of Dagestan Location within Russia
- Coordinates: 42°25′N 47°26′E
- Country: Russia
- Region: Republic of Dagestan
- District: Levashinsky District
- Time zone: UTC+3:00

Buanzimakhi (Russian: Буанзимахи; Dargwa: БургӀянзимахьи) is a rural locality (a selo) in Ayalakabsky Selsoviet, Levashinsky District, Republic of Dagestan, Russia. The population was 170 as of 2010. There are 2 streets.

== Geography ==
It is located 11 km east of Levashi, on the Kakaozen River.

== Nationalities ==
Dargins live there.
