= Gamid Gamidov =

Russian politician (1954–1996)

- Born: June 6, 1954; Mekegi, Levashinsky District, Dagestan, Soviet Union
- Died: August 20, 1996 (aged 42); Makhachkala, Dagestan, Russia
- Occupation: Politician
- Relatives: Abdusamad Gamidov (brother)

Gamid Mustafayevich Gamidov (Russian: Гамид Мустафаевич Гамидов; June 6, 1954 - August 20, 1996) was a Russian politician. Born on June 6, 1954 in Mekegi, Gamidov graduated from Dagestan State University. He began his career as a banker for Elbin and Sberbank in Dagestan. He was elected as a member of the State Duma for Makhachkala's district in December 1995 and appointed as Dagestan's Minister of Finance in April 1996. He was awarded the Order of Courage on July 12, 1996.

Gamidov is the namesake of the Gamid Gamidov Sports Complex in Khasavyurt as well as Gamid Gamidov Avenue and the Gamid Gamidov Wresting School in Makhachkala.
