= Dibgalik =

Dibgalik Дибгалик Дибгалихъ
- Selo
- Location within Republic of Dagestan Location within Russia
- Coordinates: 42°07′N 47°39′E
- Country: Russia
- Region: Republic of Dagestan
- District: Dakhadayevsky District
- Time zone: UTC+3:00

Dibgalik (Russian: Дибгалик; Dargwa: Дибгалик) is a rural locality (a selo) in Dibgalikskiy Selsoviet, Dakhadayevsky District, Republic of Dagestan, Russia. The population was 554 as of 2010. There are 6 streets.

== Geography ==
Dibgalik is located 6 km southeast of Urkarakh (the district's administrative centre) by road. Buskri and Chishili are the nearest rural localities.
