= Magomed Gadzhiyev =

Russian politician (born 1965)

- Магомед Гаджиев
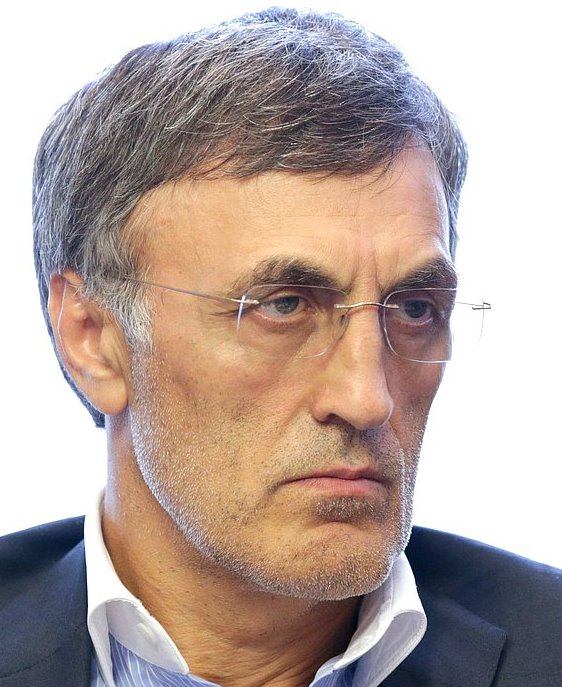
- Gadzhiyev in 2018

Deputy of the State Duma
- In office December 2003 – 12 October 2021

Personal details
- Born: Magomed Gadzhiyev; 7 April 1965 (age 61) Makhachkala, Dagestan ASSR, Russian SFSR, Soviet Union
- Party: United Russia

Magomed Tazhudinovich Gadzhiyev (Russian: Магомед Тажудинович Гаджиев; born 7 April 1965) is a Russian political and public figure. He served as a deputy of the State Duma for its 4th, 5th, 6th and 7th convocations. He was a member of the United Russia political party, and served as a member of the Duma's Committee on Development of Civil Society, Public and Religious Organizations. He is a Major General of the Federal Taxation Service.

== Biography ==
Gadzhiyev was born on 7 April 1965 in Makhachkala, then in the Dagestan Autonomous Soviet Socialist Republic, in the Soviet Union. In 1996 Gadzhiyev graduated from the Institute of Management and Business in Makhachkala and then in 1998 completed a degree at the Faculty of Law of the Dagestan State University.

After his discharge from military service, he was appointed deputy director (1985-1994), then director (1994-1996) of the Khushetskaya equipment base of the Dagvino association of the Dagestan ASSR. In 1996, after graduation, he joined the West Caspian basin administration for protection, repopulation of the stock of fish and fisheries regulation as deputy director of the administration. From 1998 to 2001, he held the positions of the deputy head of the tax service of the Republic of Dagestan and deputy head of the Department of the Ministry of Taxation for the Republic of Dagestan.

Since 2001 he worked as Deputy Head of the Interregional Inspection of the Ministry of Taxes and Duties of the Russian Federation for the Southern Federal District. In December 2003, he was elected as deputy of the 4th convocation of the State Duma.

In 2007, he was elected to the State Duma's 5th convocation as part of the federal list of candidates nominated by the political party United Russia.

In December 2011, he was nominated from the United Russia political party to the State Duma of the Russian Federation, according to the results of the distribution of mandates, he was elected to the State Duma's VI convocation.

In September 2016, he was nominated to the State Duma of the Russian Federation from the United Russia political party, according to the results of the distribution of mandates, he was elected a deputy of the State Duma's VII convocation.

In June 2022, during the Russian invasion of Ukraine, Gadzhiyev sent humanitarian aid to the residents of the Donetsk and Lugansk regions. A convoy with the logos #Zанаших #сVоихнебросаем delivered food and essential goods. He also organized the dispatch of military equipment for Russian volunteers who are fighting in Ukraine.

== Legislative activity ==
From 2004 to 2019, during his term as a deputy of the State Duma of the 4th, 5th, 6th and 7th convocations, he co-authored 303 legislative initiatives and amendments to draft federal laws, including those concerning the annexation of Crimea.

As a member of the United Russia faction in the Duma, he voted for a number of bills, including the Yarovaya Package, which prohibits US citizens from adopting children from Russia.

== Criticism ==
A group of EU, US and Ukrainian politicians called for sanctions against Gadzhiev and others for their support of Russia's invasion of Ukraine. American political scientist Jason Smart tweeted that «Magomed Gadzhiev should be under US and EU sanctions, and not live his luxurious life in Western countries, supporting the war in Ukraine».

An investigative piece by the Romanian RBN media outlet reported that Magomed Gadzhiev made attempts to obtain European citizenship in exchange for providing information about Russian authorities and oligarchs. According to the investigation, he has property in Miami, Florida, worth millions of dollars.
