= Urakhi =

Urakhi Урахи Хӏурхъи
- Selo
- Location within Republic of Dagestan Location within Russia
- Coordinates: 42°20′N 47°35′E
- Country: Russia
- Region: Republic of Dagestan
- District: Sergokalinsky District
- Time zone: UTC+3:00

Urakhi (Russian: Урахи; Dargwa: Хӏурхъи) is a rural locality (a selo) and the administrative centre of Urakhinsky Selsoviet, Sergokalinsky District, Republic of Dagestan, Russia. Population: 671 (2010 census); 1,285 (2002 census); 707 (1989 Soviet census).

== Geography ==
Urakhi is located 22 km southwest of Sergokala (the district's administrative centre) by road. Verkhniye Makhargimakhi and Nizhneye Mulebki are the nearest rural localities.

== Nationalities ==
Dargins live there.

== Famous residents ==
- Alibek Takho-Godi (Soviet revolutionary, statesman and public figure of Dagestan)
