= Ikra, Republic of Dagestan =

Ikra Икра Кӏири
- Selo
- Location within Republic of Dagestan Location within Russia
- Coordinates: 41°33′N 48°00′E
- Country: Russia
- Region: Republic of Dagestan
- District: Kurakhsky District
- Time zone: UTC+3:00

Ikra (Russian: Икра), also Kiri (Lezgian: Кӏири) is a rural locality (a selo) and the administrative centre of Ikrinsky Selsoviet, Kurakhsky District, Republic of Dagestan, Russia. The population was 1,618 as of 2010. There are 16 streets.

== Geography ==
Ikra is located 23 km southwest of Kurakh (the district's administrative centre) by road, on the Kurakh River. Kabir and Kutul are the nearest rural localities.

== Nationalities ==
Lezgins live there.

== Famous residents ==
- Abdullah Kirivi, the most famous Lezgin abrek
- Esed Salikhov (Hero of the Soviet Union)
- Zeynudin Batmanaov (Hero of Russia)
