= Yulia Yuzik =

Journalist, writer from Russia

- Born: February 23, 1981 (age 45); Donetsk, Rostov Oblast, Russian SFSR, Soviet Union
- Occupations: Writer, journalist, politician

Yulia Viktorovna Yuzik (Russian: Юлия Викторовна Юзик; born 23 February 1981) is a journalist and non-fiction writer from Russia. She is author of Brides of Allah and Beslan Dictionary, and contributed reports in Russian newspapers as well as Time magazine about modern Russian policies in the North Caucasus. In October 2019, Yuzik was briefly arrested in Iran.

== Early life and career ==
Yuzik was born in 1981 in Donetsk, Rostov Oblast. Despite what has been published in Iranian news media, Yuzik is of Russian and Polish-Ukrainian descent. At age 17, she first worked as a journalist for the local edition of Komsomolskaya Pravda in Rostov-on-Don, — it was her dream to work there. Yuzik was promoted to the all-Russia edition of Pravda in Moscow, where she worked as a reporter. Yuzik also reported for Russky Newsweek.

=== Brides of Allah ===
While reporting for Pravda, she visited in 2002 Chechnya in the Russian North Caucasus. After meeting with Chechens, and earlier, in 2001, Dagestani people, she wrote a documentary about suicide bombers Brides of Allah. Yuzik started to work on the book while on assignment in Dagestan in 2001, and read there in a local edition of all-Russia newspaper Moskovskij Komsomolets about Aiza Gazuyeva, a young Chechen woman who blew herself up near a military office in the Chechen town of Urus-Martan; the woman was the same age as Yuzik, which shocked her. Later the Moscow theater hostage crisis happened in 2002, when dozens of viewers of the musical Nord-Ost in a Moscow cultural center were killed. This motivated her to travel to North Caucasus to search for material for the book. Brides of Allah were published in 2003. It was a success, especially outside Russia, and was translated into Japanese and other languages. Yuzik left Pravda in 2003. She said, the newspaper management "asked her to leave", so she thought her departure was somehow connected with her book.

=== Beslan Dictionary ===
After a school in Beslan was captured by terrorists in 2004 and many children were killed. She visited Beslan and talked with local people, gathering material for her second documentary Beslan Dictionary. Yuzik recorded dozens of residents who were struck by the catastrophe. Her method was inspired by documentarian Svetlana Aleksievich. Yuzik said the work was emotionally difficult. Thereafter she avoid watching documentaries about Beslan. The book was a success, published in France and Germany.

=== Politician ===
Yuzik ran for Russian State Parliament (Duma) in 2016. Her candidacy was registered in the North Caucasus' Republic of Dagestan, where Yuzik campaigned despite having no roots in the region. Yuzik claimed that she wanted to be an independent candidate not associated with a party. Newspapers called her to be associated with the Russian pro-democracy People's Freedom Party. Political activist and philanthropist Mikhail Khodorkovsky invested in her campaign.

=== Detention in Iran ===
Looking for a job, Yuzik traveled to Iran in 2013, where she worked as an expert on Russia, as a lecturer in Tehran University about Salafism in Russia, as a consultant for the Iranian International news outlet Iran Today, with the help of a translator because she did not know Persian (Iran Today was supposed to send her reportage to Russia 24, but she did not complete any reports). Yuzik worked in Iran for two months, then returned to Russia. Since then, Yuzik traveled without problem for short visits in Iran as a tourist. In 2018, her laptop was searched at the Tehran airport checkpoint and she was questioned by State Security for one day.

While travelling to Iran to meet friends in 2019, she was detained and spent more than a week in Iranian jail, from October 2 to 9. When she was freed with the help of the Russian Embassy, she said she did not know which jail she was in or where it was located. Yuzik feared that she would be accused as an Israeli spy. Yuzik said she was questioned multiple times by the Islamic Revolutionary Guard Corps, who told her that if she admitted she was an Israeli agent, the Guard would free her at once. Yuzik decided that it was a lie and refused.

== Works ==
- Brides of Allah (published in French: Les fiancées d'Allah), 2003
- Requiem for Beslan (published in French: Requiem pour Beslan), 2006

== See also ==
- List of foreign nationals detained in Iran
