= Dagestan State Pedagogical University =

University in Makhachkala, Dagestan, Russia

Dagestan State Pedagogical University (DSPU)
- Дагестанский государственный педагогический университет (ДГПУ)
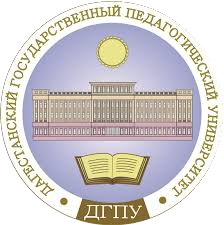
- Former names: Pedagogical Institute; Dagestan Women's Teacher's Institute named after Gamzat Tsadasa; Dagestan State Women's Pedagogical Institute; Dagestan State Pedagogical Institute
- Type: public
- Established: 1917
- Rector: Nariman Asvarovich Asvarov (interim)
- Students: 9646
- Location: 57 Muhammad Yaragsky street, Makhachkala, Dagestan, Russia; 42°58′16″N 47°30′31″E
- Campus: Urban
- Website: dgpu.net

Dagestan State Pedagogical University (DSPU; Russian: Дагестанский государственный педагогический университет; ДГПУ, Dagestanskiy gosudarstvennyy pedagogicheskiy universitet; DGPU) is a state university in Southern Federal District of Russia located in the city of Makhachkala, the capital of the Republic of Dagestan.

== History ==
There is controversy about the DSPU's founding date. The “History” section of the DSPU site mentions 12 November 1917 when the Pedagogical Institute was opened in the town Temirkhan-Shura (modern Buynaksk). In 1931, the Pedagogical Institute was opened in Makhachkala. However, in the “Information” section, the founding date of the DSPU is 1 November 1943. On this day, by the decision of the Council of People's Commissars of the RSFSR No. 903, the Dagestan Women's Teacher's Institute was organized, in which girls of the indigenous ethnicities of Dagestan were trained as teachers for the seven-year schools of the republic. The institute began work on 1 October 1944.

On 31 July 1951, the institute was named after the national poet of Dagestan Gamzat Tsadasa. By the Decree of the Council of People's Commissars of the Dagestan ASSR dated 4 August 1954, No. 285, the Dagestan State Women's Teacher's Institute was reorganized into the Dagestan State Women's Pedagogical Institute. In 1964 it was transformed into the Dagestan State Pedagogical Institute. In 1994, the institute was transformed into the Dagestan State Pedagogical University.

More than 15 thousand people study at the DSPU every year. In the second half of the 2000s, DSPU ranked second in terms of the number of students among the universities of the Southern Federal District.

== Structure ==
Faculties

DSPU has 15 faculties (including one institute):

- Biology, Geography, and Chemistry
- Dagestan Philology
- Early Childhood Education
- Foreign Languages
- Historical
- Institute of Physics and Mathematics Information and Technological Education
- Primary Grades
- Management and Law
- Social Pedagogy and Psychology
- Special (defectological) Education
- Vocational-Pedagogical Education
- Physical Culture and Life Safety
- Philological
- Artistic and Graphics
- Musical and Pedagogical

Research institutes

- Research Institute of Defectology, Clinical Psychology, and Inclusive Education
- Research Institute of General and Inorganic Chemistry
- Research Institute of Philology

Branches

- Branch in Derbent
