= Sergokala =

Rural locality in Dagestan, Russia

Coordinates: 42°27′16″N 47°39′38″E

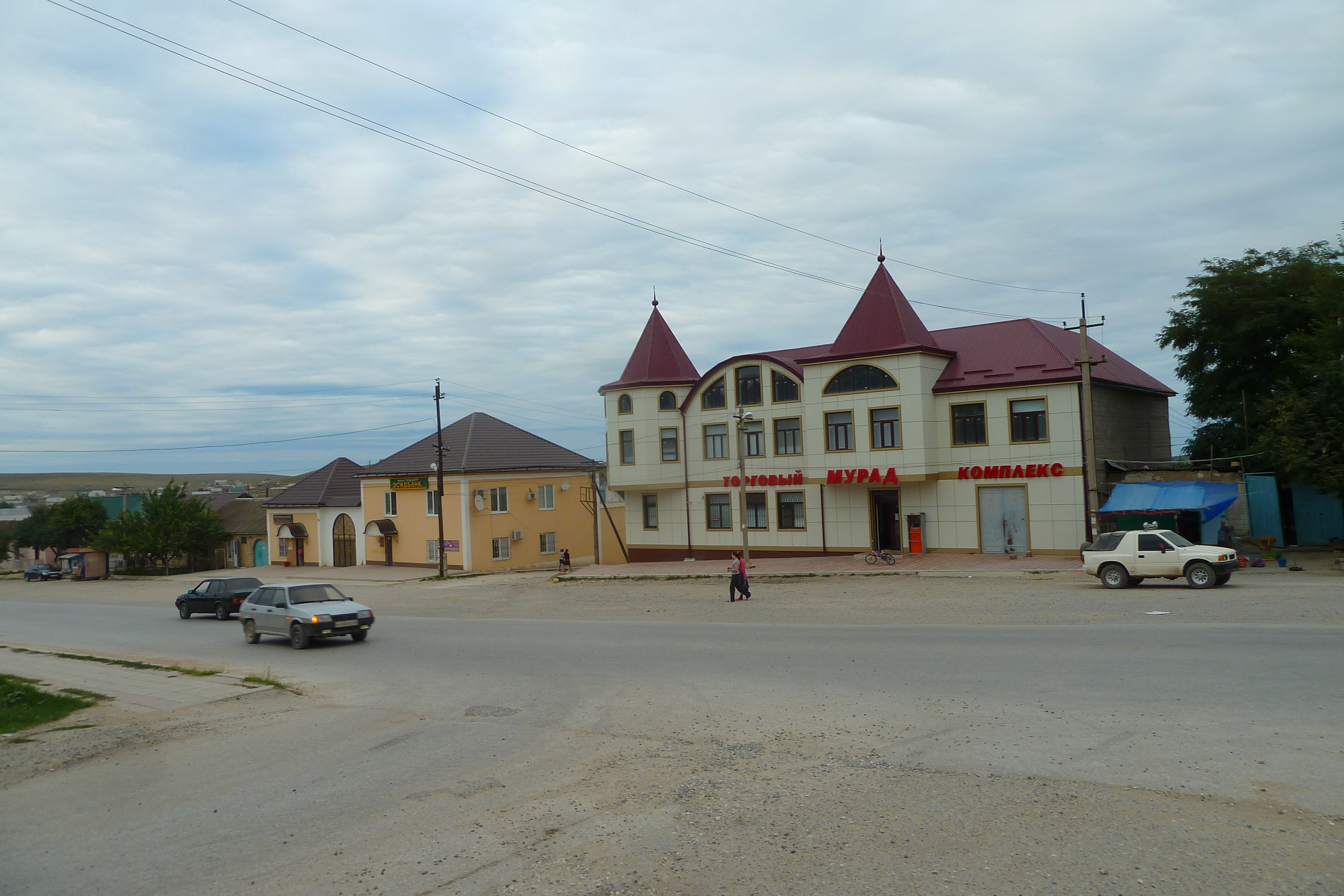
Street of Sergokala

Sergokala (Russian: Сергокала, Dargin: Сергокъала) is a rural locality (a selo) and the administrative center of Sergokalinsky District of the Republic of Dagestan, Russia. Population: 8,143 (2010 census); 7,627 (2002 census); 5,591 (1989 Soviet census).
