= Sergokalinsky District =

Sergokalinsky District Сергокалинский район (Russian)
- District

Other transcription(s)
  - Dargwa: Сергокъала къатI
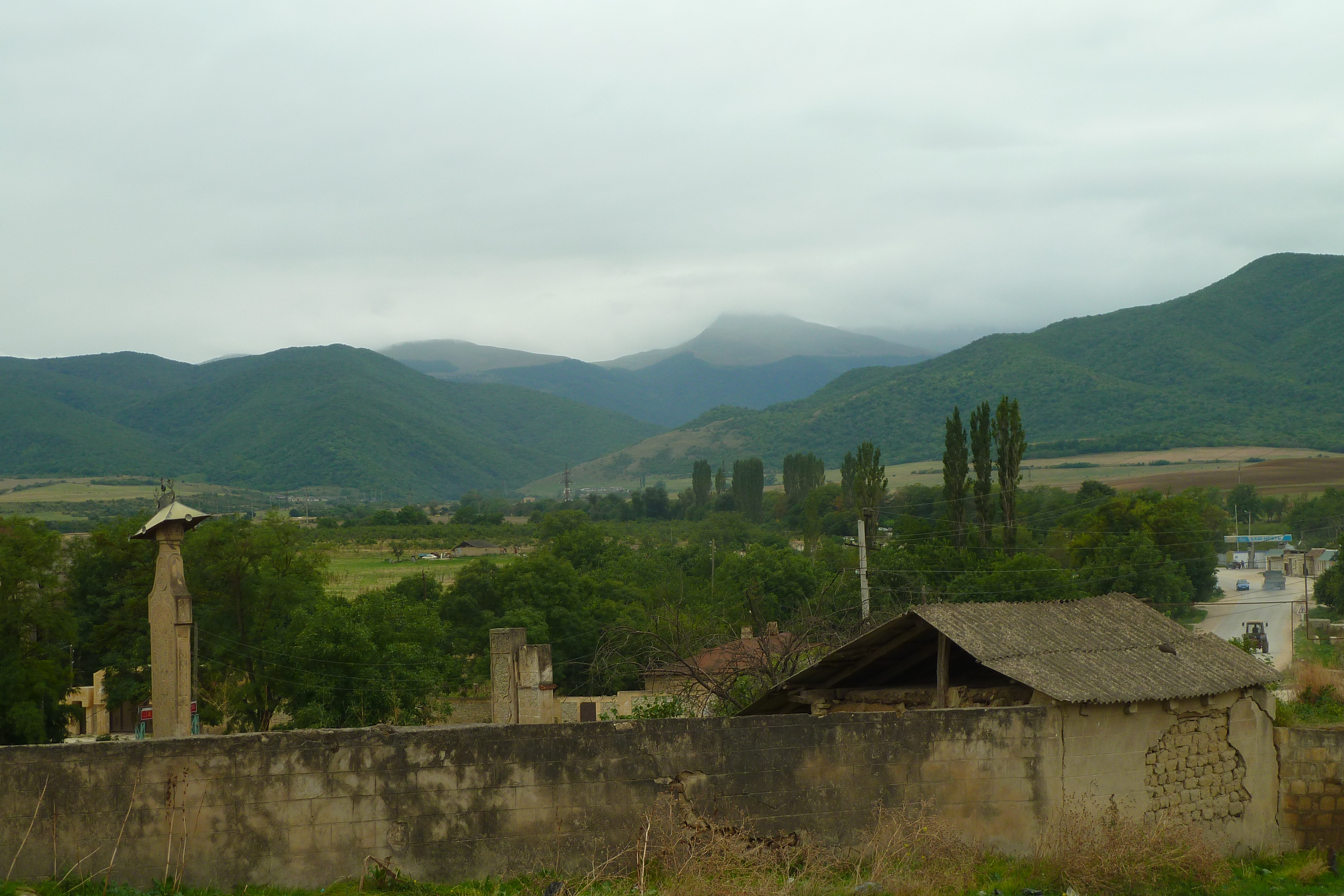
- Landscape of Sergokalinsky District

- Flag Coat of arms
- Location of Sergokalinsky District in the Republic of Dagestan
- Coordinates: 42°27′N 47°40′E
- Country: Russia
- Federal subject: Republic of Dagestan
- Established: 1929
- Administrative center: Sergokala

Area
  - Total: 528.4 km^{2} (204.0 sq mi)

Population (2010 Census)
  - Total: 27,133
  - Density: 51.35/km^{2} (133.0/sq mi)
  - Urban: 0%
  - Rural: 100%

Administrative structure
  - Administrative divisions: 10 Selsoviets
  - Inhabited localities: 35 rural localities

Municipal structure
  - Municipally incorporated as: Sergokalinsky Municipal District
  - Municipal divisions: 0 urban settlements, 15 rural settlements
- Time zone: UTC+3 (MSK)
- OKTMO ID: 82644000
- Website: http://www.sergokala.ru

Population of Sergokalinsky District
- 2010 Census: 27,133
- 2002 Census: 29,665
- 1989 Census: 18,700
- 1979 Census: 19,691

Sergokalinsky District (Russian: Сергокали́нский райо́н; Dargwa: Сергокъала къатI) is an administrative and municipal district (raion), one of the forty-one in the Republic of Dagestan, Russia. It is located in the east of the republic. The area of the district is 528.4 square kilometers (204.0 sq mi). Its administrative center is the rural locality (a selo) of Sergokala. As of the 2010 Census, the total population of the district was 27,133, with the population of Sergokala accounting for 30.0% of that number.

== Administrative and municipal status ==
Within the framework of administrative divisions, Sergokalinsky District is one of the forty-one in the Republic of Dagestan. The district is divided into ten selsoviets which comprise thirty-five rural localities. As a municipal division, the district is incorporated as Sergokalinsky Municipal District. Its ten selsoviets are incorporated as fifteen rural settlements within the municipal district. The selo of Sergokala serves as the administrative center of both the administrative and municipal district.
