= Levashi, Republic of Dagestan =

Rural locality in Dagestan, Russia

Coordinates: 42°25′53″N 47°19′25″E

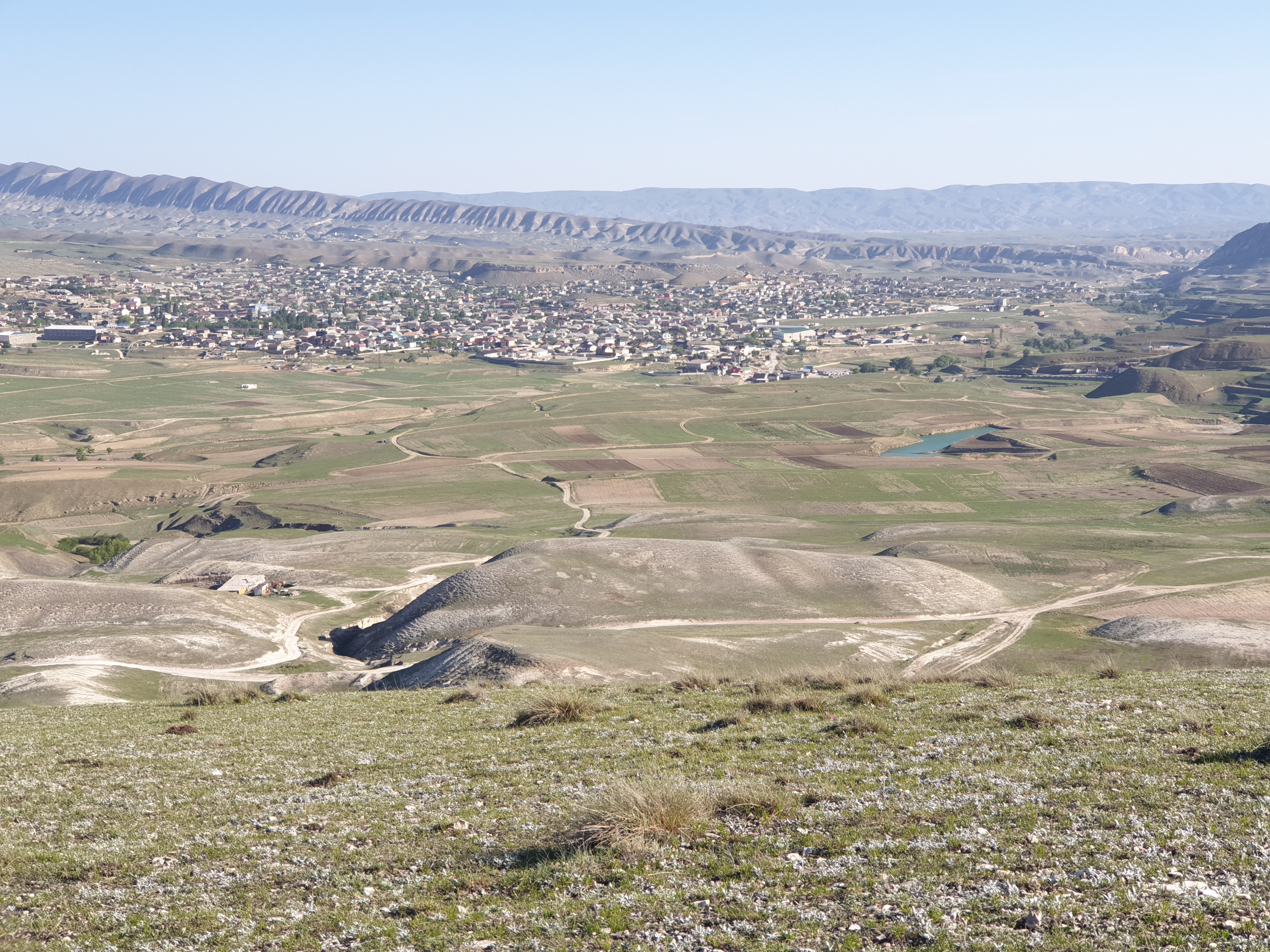
Levashi

Levashi (Russian: Леваши; Dargwa: Лаваша) is a rural locality (a selo) and the administrative center of Levashinsky District of the Republic of Dagestan, Russia. During the Russian Empire it was the administrative capital of the Darginsky Okrug.

Population: 10,011 (2010 census); 7,302 (2002 census); 6,071 (1989 Soviet census).

== Sources ==
- Народное Собрание Республики Дагестан. Закон №16 от 10 апреля 2002 г. «Об административно-территориальном устройстве Республики Дагестан», в ред. Закона №106 от 30 декабря 2013 г. «О внесении изменений в некоторые законодательные акты Республики Дагестан». Вступил в силу со дня официального опубликования. Опубликован: "Дагестанская правда", №81, 12 апреля 2002 г. (People's Assembly of the Republic of Dagestan. Law #16 of April 10, 2002 On the Administrative-Territorial Structure of the Republic of Dagestan, as amended by the Law #106 of December 30, 2013 On Amending Various Legislative Acts of the Republic of Dagestan. Effective as of the day of the official publication.).
- Народное Собрание Республики Дагестан. Закон №6 от 13 января 2005 г. «О статусе и границах муниципальных образований Республики Дагестан», в ред. Закона №43 от 30 апреля 2015 г. «О статусе городского округа с внутригородским делением "Город Махачкала", статусе и границах внутригородских районов в составе городского округа с внутригородским делением "Город Махачкала" и о внесении изменений в отдельные законодательные акты Республики Дагестан». Вступил в силу со дня официального опубликования. Опубликован: "Дагестанская правда", №8, 15 февраля 2005 г. (People's Assembly of the Republic of Dagestan. Law #6 of January 13, 2005 On the Status and Borders of the Municipal Formations of the Republic of Dagestan, as amended by the Law #43 of April 30, 2015 On the Status of the "City of Makhachkala" Urban Okrug with Intra-Urban Divisions, the Status and the Borders of the Intra-City Districts Comprising the "City of Makhachkala" Urban Okrug with Intra-Urban Divisions, and on Amending Various Legislative Acts of the Republic of Dagestan. Effective as of the day of the official publication.).
