= Levashinsky District =

Levashinsky District Левашинский район (Russian)
- District

Other transcription(s)
  - Dargwa: Лавашала къатI
  - Avar: Лаваша мухъ
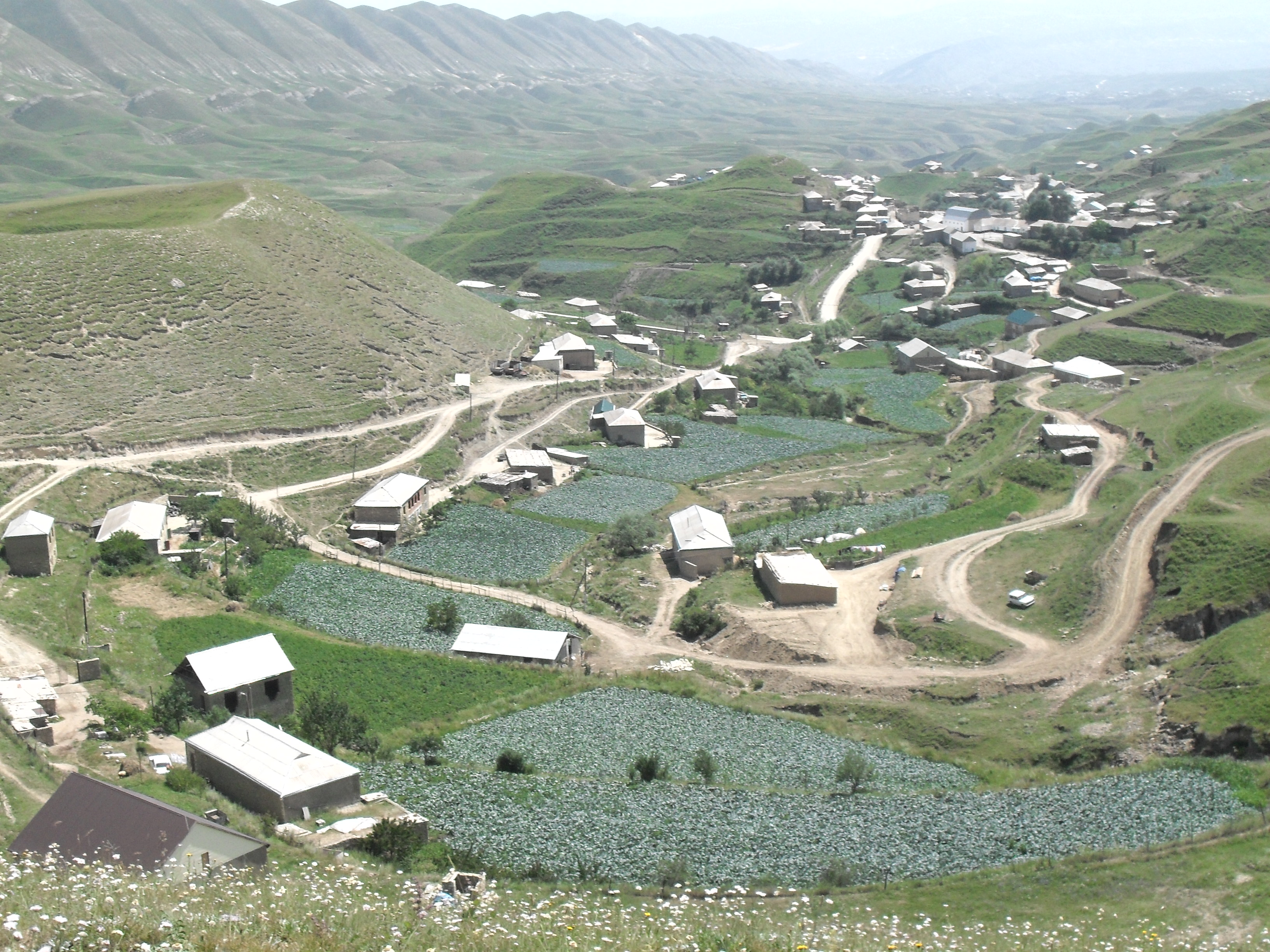
- The selo of Orada Chugli in Levashinsky District

- Coat of arms
- Location of Levashinsky District in the Republic of Dagestan
- Coordinates: 42°26′N 47°19′E
- Country: Russia
- Federal subject: Republic of Dagestan
- Established: 22 November 1928
- Administrative center: Levashi

Area
  - Total: 830 km^{2} (320 sq mi)

Population (2010 Census)
  - Total: 70,704
  - Density: 85/km^{2} (220/sq mi)
  - Urban: 0%
  - Rural: 100%

Administrative structure
  - Administrative divisions: 13 Selsoviets
  - Inhabited localities: 67 rural localities

Municipal structure
  - Municipally incorporated as: Levashinsky Municipal District
  - Municipal divisions: 0 urban settlements, 26 rural settlements
- Time zone: UTC+3 (MSK)
- OKTMO ID: 82634000
- Website: web.archive.org

Population of Levashinsky District
- 2010 Census: 70,704
- 2002 Census: 64,371
- 1989 Census: 40,186
- 1979 Census: 36,459

Levashinsky District (Russian: Левашинский райо́н; Dargwa: Лавашала къатI; Avar: Лаваша мухъ) is an administrative and municipal district (raion), one of the forty-one in the Republic of Dagestan, Russia. It is located in the center of the republic. The area of the district is 830 square kilometers (320 sq mi). Its administrative center is the rural locality (a selo) of Levashi. As of the 2010 Census, the total population of the district was 70,704, with the population of Levashi accounting for 14.2% of that number.

== Administrative and municipal status ==
Within the framework of administrative divisions, Levashinsky District is one of the forty-one in the Republic of Dagestan. The district is divided into thirteen selsoviets which comprise sixty-seven rural localities. As a municipal division, the district is incorporated as Levashinsky Municipal District. Its thirteen selsoviets are incorporated as twenty-six rural settlements within the municipal district. The selo of Levashi serves as the administrative center of both the administrative and municipal district.
