= 2026 Dagestan head election =

Regional legislative election in Russia

- 15 October 2026
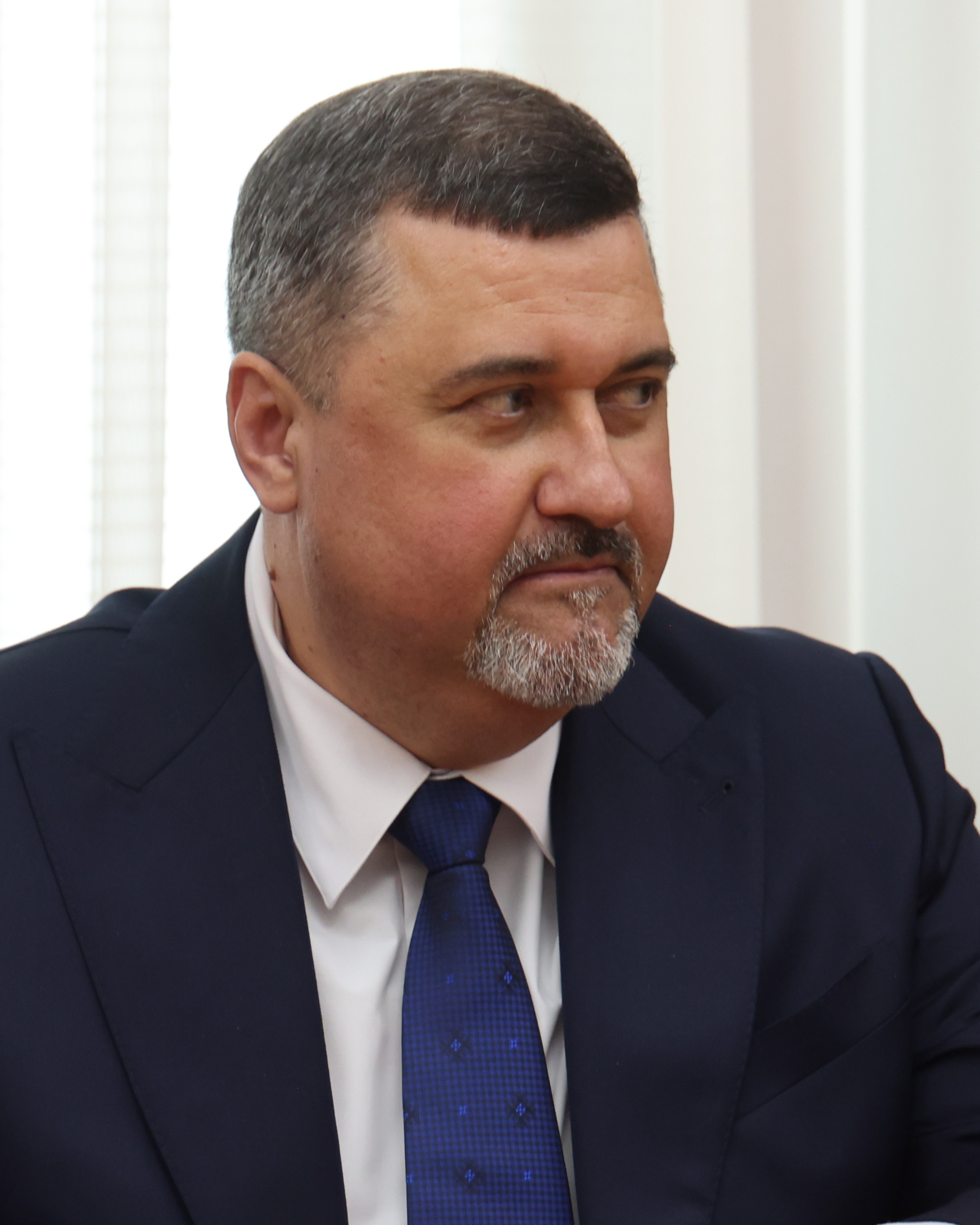

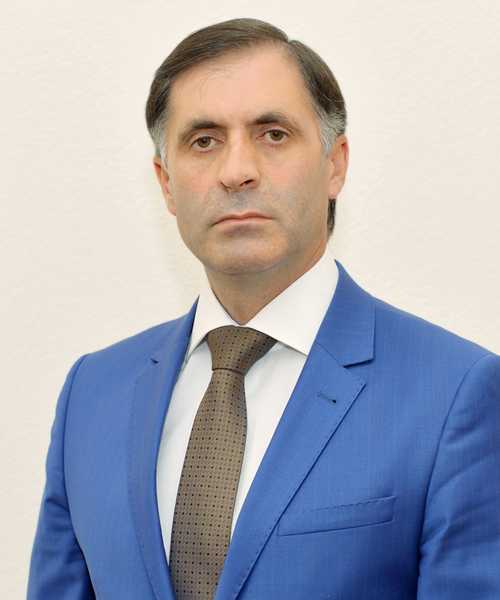
		CPRF
Candidate	Fyodor Shchukin	Samir Abdulkhalikov	Kamil Davdiyev
Party	United Russia	CPRF	A Just Russia
Electoral vote	78	4	4
Percentage	89.66%	4.60%	4.60%
Head before election
Fyodor Shchukin (acting)
United Russia
Head-elect
Fyodor Shchukin
United Russia
Senator before election
Ilyas Umakhanov
United Russia
Senator after election
Ilyas Umakhanov
United Russia

The 2026 Dagestan head election took place on 15 October 2026 to elect the Head of the Republic of Dagestan. Acting Head Fyodor Shchukin was elected for a full term in office. Head of Dagestan was elected by the People's Assembly of the Republic of Dagestan, following the 2026 Dagestan legislative election.

== Background ==
Then-Head of the Republic of Dagestan Vladimir Vasilyev, who led the republic since 2017, announced his resignation in October 2020. President of Russia Vladimir Putin approved Vasilyev's resignation, nominating him to be his aide, and appointed Senator from Stavropol Krai Sergey Melikov, an ethnic Lezgin, as acting Head of Dagestan. Vasilyev's resignation was expected as he was viewed a temporary figure with federal support appointed to oversee corrupt regional elite purge. On October 14, 2021, newly-formed People's Assembly of the Republic of Dagestan elected Melikov as Head of Dagestan with 82 votes in favor out of 90. Meanwhile, Vasilyev was elected to the State Duma in the Zavolzhsky constituency and became United Russia parliamentary faction leader, a position he previously held in 2012–2017.

As Head of Dagestan Melikov was considered a tough and harsh manager, who was able to maintain a balance in the regional elite. However, under Melikov's leadership Dagestan faced several crises, including severe and extensive deterioration of public utilities, COVID-19 pandemic consequences, anti-mobilization protests, rising terrorist threat (including deadly 2024 Dagestan attacks) and instability, which was evident during the 2023 antisemitic riots. During the period Dagestan also saw continuing anticorruption investigations as numerous officials were arrested, including Kizilyurt mayor Magomed Magomedov (October 2023), Izerbash mayor Magomed Isakov (October 2024), former Minister of Health Tatyana Belyayeva (October 2025), and former Minister of Construction Artur Suleimanov (March 2026), however, the most consequential development occurred in June 2025 when highly influential State Secretary of Dagestan Magomed-Sultan Magomedov was arrested and his oil assets were seized. Melikov himself got into conflict with powerful Senator Suleiman Kerimov but by October 2024 they reconciled and Melikov even supported Kerimov in his clash with Ramzan Kadyrov.

Numerous regional conflicts and an array of problems led experts to believe Sergey Melikov highly likely to be replaced as Head of Dagestan before his first term ends. In April 2026 Vedomosti reported that Melikov could resign from his position in spring 2026. President Putin sent Deputy Presidential Envoy to the Far Eastern Federal District Magomed Ramazanov to oversee 2026 Dagestan flood relief, which raised speculation about Ramazanov becoming next Head of Dagestan.

On April 30 Putin met with People's Assembly of Dagestan and State Duma members, where the President announced that Melikov wouldn't be considered for another term as he would soon change jobs. People's Assembly speaker Zaur Askenderov suggested to nominate Supreme Court of Dagestan chairman Fyodor Shchukin as Head of Dagestan and to appoint Magomed Ramazanov as Prime Minister of Dagestan, which Putin supported. On May 4, 2026, Melikov from his office and Putin appointed Shchukin as acting Head of Dagestan. Melikov meanwhile claimed that he asked President Putin not to appoint him to a new position so he could help Shchukin early in his term.

== Candidates ==
Head of the Republic of Dagestan is elected indirectly, by the People's Assembly of the Republic of Dagestan, for the term of five years. Candidate for Head of Dagestan should be a Russian citizen and at least 30 years old. Candidates for Head of Dagestan should not have a foreign citizenship or residence permit. Candidates for Head of Dagestan are nominated by political parties, which have factions either in the People's Assembly of Dagestan or in the State Duma, and the parties can nominate up to three candidates each. President of Russia then selects three nominated candidates and submits them to the People's Assembly of Dagestan. The People's Assembly elects Head of Dagestan with a simple majority. Also head candidates present 3 candidacies to the Federation Council and election winner later appoints one of the presented candidates.

The following parties are eligible to nominate a candidate for Head of Dagestan:

- United Russia
- Communist Party of the Russian Federation
- Liberal Democratic Party of Russia
- A Just Russia
- New People

=== Declared ===
Candidate name, political party	Occupation	Status	Ref.
Samir Abdulkhalikov; Communist Party	Member of People's Assembly of the Republic of Dagestan (2021–present)	Submitted by the President	
Kamil Davdiyev; A Just Russia	Deputy Chairman of the People's Assembly of the Republic of Dagestan (2016–present); Member of the People's Assembly (2007–present)	Submitted by the President	
Fyodor Shchukin; United Russia	Acting Head of the Republic of Dagestan (2026–present); Former Chairman of the Supreme Court of Dagestan (2024–2026)	Submitted by the President	

=== Declined ===
- Magomed Ramazanov (United Russia), former Deputy Presidential Envoy to the Far Eastern Federal District (2026) (appointed Prime Minister of Dagestan)

== Results ==
Summary of the 20 September 2026 Dagestan head election results
Candidate	Party	Votes	%
Fyodor Shchukin (incumbent)	United Russia	78	89.66
Samir Abdulkhalikov	Communist Party	4	4.60
Kamil Davdiyev	A Just Russia	4	4.60
Valid votes		86	98.85
Blank ballots		1	1.15
Total		87	100.00
Turnout		87	96.67
Registered voters		90	100.00

Head Shchukin re-appointed incumbent Senator Ilyas Umakhanov (United Russia) to the Federation Council.

== See also ==
- 2026 Russian regional elections
