= List of leaders of the Dagestan ASSR =

Leaders of the Dagestan ASSR
- Coat of arms of the Dagestan ASSR
- Appointer: Politburo, Central Committee or any party apparatus and by electoral vote
- Formation: December 1921; 104 years ago
- First holder: Nazhmutdin Samurskiy (Efendiyev) (as Chairman of the Central Executive Committee); Djelal ed-Din Korkmasov (as Chairman of the Council of People's Commissars)
- Final holder: Magomedali Magomedov (as Chairman of the Supreme Soviet); Abdurazak Mirzabekov (as Chairman of the Council of Ministers)
- Abolished: 25 December 1991; 34 years ago

The following is a list of leaders of the Dagestan Autonomous Soviet Socialist Republic (the Dagestan ASSR). It lists heads of state, heads of government and heads of the local branch of the Communist Party of the Soviet Union.

During its existence, the Dagestan ASSR was a part of the Russian Soviet Federative Socialist Republic (the Russian SFSR).

== Heads of state ==
No.	Portrait	Name (Birth–Death)	Term of office		Political party
No.	Portrait	Name (Birth–Death)	Took office	Left office	Political party
Chairmen of the Central Executive Committee (1921–1938)
1		Nazhmutdin Samurskiy (Efendiyev) (1891–1938)	December 1921	1928	Communist Party
2		Magomed Dalgat (1893–1942)	1928	1937	Communist Party
3		Adil-Girey Takhtarov (1886–1962)	1937	26 July 1938	Communist Party
Chairmen of the Presidium of the Supreme Soviet (1938–1990)
(3)		Adil-Girey Takhtarov (1886–1962)	26 July 1938	1950	Communist Party
4		Abdul-Gamid Batyrmurzayev (1903–1957)	1950	1952	Communist Party
5		Arslan-Ali Mantayev (1918–1997)	1952	1954	Communist Party
6		Gadshi-Kasum Aliyev	1954	March 1962	Communist Party
7		Roza Eldarova (1923–2021)	March 1962	November 1967	Communist Party
8		Abdurakhman Daniyalov (1908–1981)	November 1967	1970	Communist Party
9		Shakhrudin Shamkhalov (1914–2000)	1970	1978	Communist Party
10		Alipasha Umalatov (1927–2022)	1978	August 1987	Communist Party
11		Magomedali Magomedov (1930–2022)	August 1987	24 April 1990	Communist Party
Chairman of the Supreme Soviet (1990–1991)
(11)		Magomedali Magomedov (1930–2022)	24 April 1990	25 December 1991	Communist Party

== Heads of government ==
No.	Portrait	Name (Birth–Death)	Term of office		Political party
No.	Portrait	Name (Birth–Death)	Took office	Left office	Political party
Chairmen of the Council of People's Commissars (1921–1946)
1		Dzhelaleddin Korkmasov (1877–1937)	December 1921	29 December 1931	Communist Party
2		Kerim Mamedbekov (1899–1938)	29 December 1931	September 1937	Communist Party
3		Dzhemalutdin Magomedov (1908–1982)	September 1937	March 1940	Communist Party
4		Abdurakhman Daniyalov (1908–1981)	March 1940	28 March 1946	Communist Party
Chairmen of the Council of Ministers (1946–1991)
(4)		Abdurakhman Daniyalov (1908–1981)	28 March 1946	December 1948	Communist Party
5		Salam Aidinbekov (1912–1967)	December 1948	1951	Communist Party
6		Magomed Medzhidov (1910–1981)	1951	29 December 1956	Communist Party
7		Magomed-Salam Umakhanov (1918–1992)	29 December 1956	30 November 1967	Communist Party
8		Alipasha Umalatov (1927–2022)	30 November 1967	1978	Communist Party
9		Magomed Yusupov (1935–)	1978	May 1983	Communist Party
10		Magomedali Magomedov (1930–2022)	May 1983	August 1987	Communist Party
11		Abdurazak Mirzabekov (1938–2008)	August 1987	25 December 1991	Communist Party

== Heads of party ==
No.	Portrait	Name (Birth–Death)	Term of office		Political party
No.	Portrait	Name (Birth–Death)	Took office	Left office	Political party
Responsible Secretaries of the Regional Committee of the Communist Party of the Soviet Union (1921–1931)
1		Aleksandr Khavenson (1897–1963)	16 February 1921	28 February 1921	Communist Party
2		Georgy Poleshko (1890–1945)	12 March 1921	1922	Communist Party
3		Ibragim Aliyev (1890–1938)	1922	1922	Communist Party
4		Aleksey Perimov (1897–1937)	1922	January 1923	Communist Party
5		Martemyan Ryutin (1890–1937)	15 January 1923	February 1924	Communist Party
6		Mussa Kundukhov (1890–1931)	February 1924	1924	Communist Party
7		Magomed Dalgat (1893–1942)	1924	1927	Communist Party
8		Moisey Granovskiy (1890–1941)	1927	1928	Communist Party
9		Aleksandr Muravyov (1894–1941)	1928	June 1931	Communist Party
10		Aron Tsekher (1895–1938)	June 1931	1931	Communist Party
First Secretaries of the Dagestan Regional Committee of the Communist Party of the Soviet Union (1931–1990)
(10)		Aron Tsekher (1895–1938)	1931	10 March 1934	Communist Party
11		Nazhmutdin Samurskiy (Efendiyev) (1891–1938)	10 March 1934	9 October 1937	Communist Party
12		Maksim Sorokin (1899–1965)	9 October 1937	January 1939	Communist Party
13		Nikolay Linkun (1904–1977)	January 1939	27 September 1942	Communist Party
14		Aziz Mamed Aliyev (1897–1962)	27 September 1942	3 December 1948	Communist Party
15		Abdurakhman Daniyalov (1908–1981)	3 December 1948	29 November 1967	Communist Party
16		Magomed-Salam Umakhanov (1918–1992)	29 November 1967	24 May 1983	Communist Party
17		Magomed Yusupov (1935–)	24 May 1983	6 March 1990	Communist Party
First Secretary of the Dagestan Republican Committee of the Communist Party of the Russian SFSR (1990–1991)
18		Mukhu Aliyev (1940–)	6 March 1990	23 August 1991	Communist Party

== See also ==
- Head of the Republic of Dagestan
- History of Dagestan
- Dagestan Autonomous Soviet Socialist Republic

== Sources ==
- World Statesmen.org
