= Magomed Abdulaev =

Dagestani politician (1961–2023)

- ГІабдулаев МухІамад; Магомед Абдулаев
- Abdulaev in 2015

Chairman of the Government of Dagestan
- In office 25 February 2010 – 30 January 2013
- President: Magomedsalam Magomedov
- Preceded by: Shamil Zainalov
- Succeeded by: Mukhtar Medzhidov

Personal details
- Born: 18 June 1961 Gamsutl, Dagestani ASSR, Russian SFSR, Soviet Union (now Republic of Dagestan, Russia)
- Died: 5 January 2023 (aged 61) Makhachkala, Dagestan, Russia
- Party: United Russia
- Education: Dagestan State University

Magomed Imranovich Abdulaev, also spelled Abdulayev, (Avar: ГІабдулаев ГІимранил МухІамад, romanized: ʻAbdulajev ʻİmranil Muḥʳamad; Russian: Магоме́д Имра́нович Абдула́ев; 18 June 1961 – 5 January 2023) was a Dagestani politician who served as the Chairman of the Government of Dagestan from 2010 to 2013.

Prior to entering politics, Abdulaev was a lawyer.

== Early life and education ==
Magomed Imranovich Abdulaev was born on 18 June 1961 in the village of Gamsutl to an Avar family. He received his secondary education at the Gunib secondary school. From 1979 to 1981, immediately after graduation, he served in the Soviet Army.

In 1982, upon returning from military service, he enrolled at Dagestan State University's faculty of law.

== Academic career ==
From 1987 to 1995, Abdulaev was engaged in research and teaching activities. Between 1998 and 2000, he taught at the Saint Petersburg State University of the Ministry of Internal Affairs of Russia as a professor in the Department of Theory of Law and State.

From 2000 to 2002, he served as head of the Department of International Law at Dagestan State University. During this period, he was also a member of the Expert Council of the Federation Council Committee on International Affairs.

== Government service ==
In 2002, Abdulaev moved to Moscow. From 2002 to 2004, he worked as an assistant to a member of the Federation Council. From 2004 to 2009, he was employed at the Institute of Public Administration and Law of the State University of Management, where he headed the Department of Legal Support of Administration.

In early 2009, Abdulaev was appointed advisor to the President of the Republic of Dagestan. On 27 October 2009, he became Deputy Chairman of the Government of Dagestan. He was later included in the list of candidates for the post of President of Dagestan, which the United Russia party submitted to the President of Russia on 19 December 2009.

On 20 February 2010, the newly appointed President of Dagestan, Magomedsalam Magomedov, appointed Abdulaev as Chairman of the Government of Dagestan. He held this post until 30 January 2013.

== Death ==
On 5 January 2023, at around 20:00, Abdulaev was hit by a VAZ-21214 Niva driven by a 55-year-old resident of Kizilyurt while crossing Magomet Gadzhiev Street in Makhachkala outside a pedestrian crossing. He was taken to hospital with severe injuries and subsequently died as a result of the accident.
