= 2026 Dagestan legislative election =

Regional legislative election in Russia

- 18–20 September 2026

All 90 seats in the People's Assembly 46 seats needed for a majority
- Turnout: 91.57% ▲7.22 pp
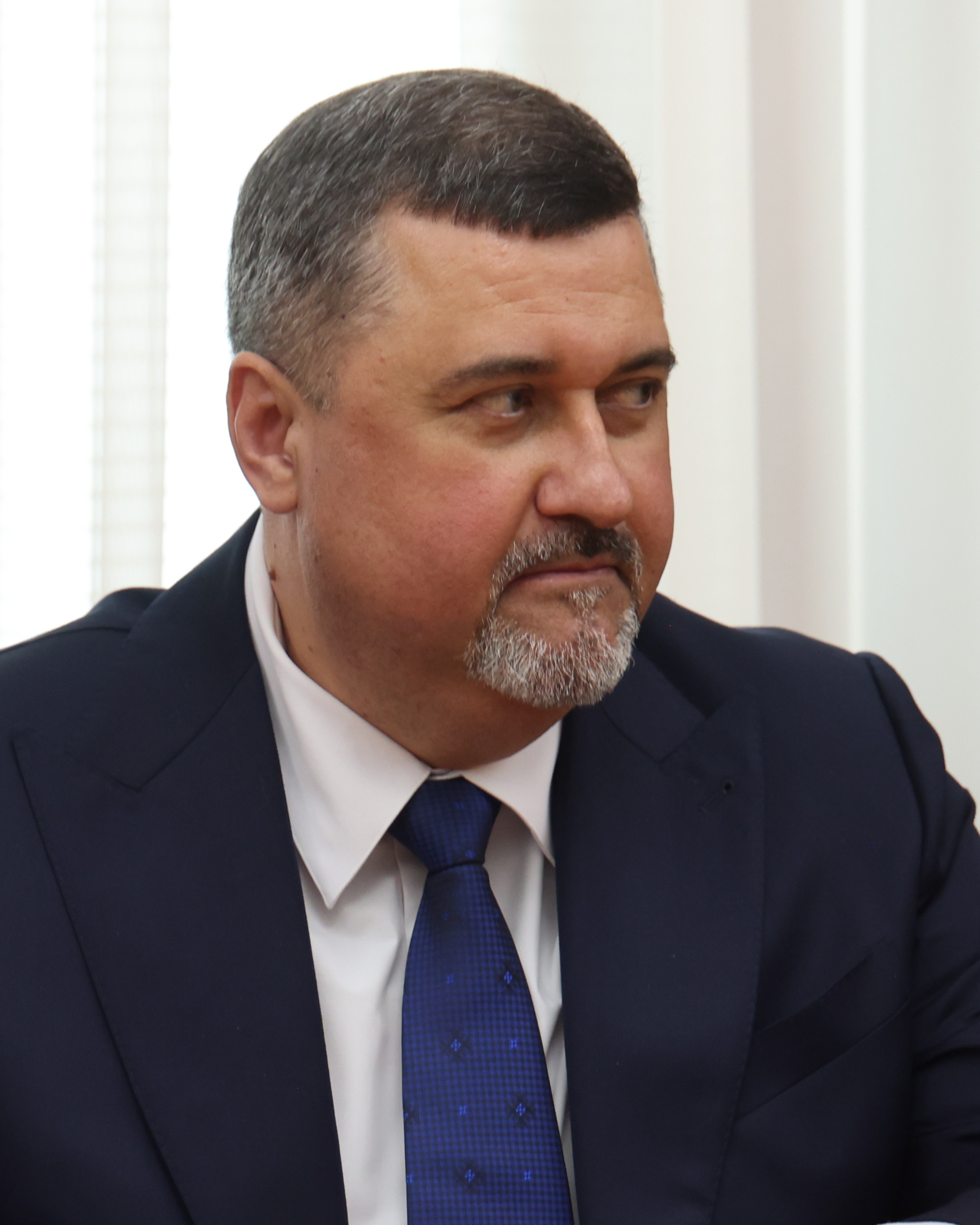

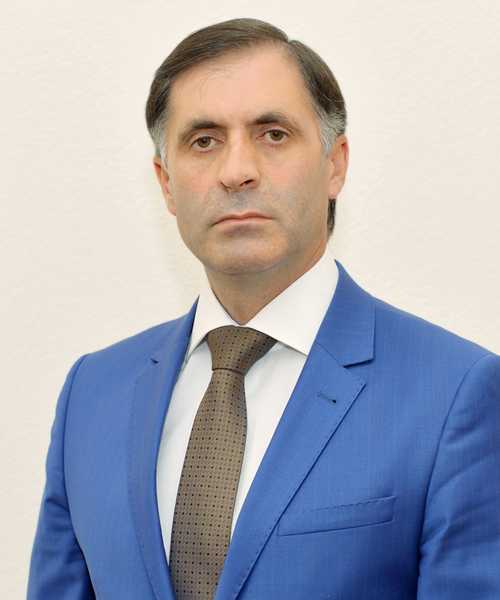
	Majority party	Minority party	Third party
			CPRF
Candidate	Fyodor Shchukin	Kamil Davdiyev	Samir Abdulkhalikov
Party	United Russia	A Just Russia	CPRF
Last election	73.74%, 69 seats	12.71%, 11 seats	11.62%, 10 seats
Seats won	69	11	10
Seat change	Steady	Steady	Steady
Popular vote	1,177,060	190,681	174,878
Percentage	74.00%	11.99%	10.99%
Swing	▲0.26 pp	▼0.72 pp	▼0.63 pp
	Fourth party	Fifth party
	LDPR	NL
Candidate	Abdulgamid Abdullayev	Paizula Dzhavatkhanov
Party	LDPR	New People
Last election	0.65%, 0 seats	Failed to qualify
Seats won	0	0
Seat change	Steady	Failed to qualify
Popular vote	26,398	16,900
Percentage	1.66%	1.06%
Swing	▲1.01 pp	Failed to qualify
Chairman before election
Zaur Askenderov
United Russia
Elected Chairman
Zaur Askenderov
United Russia
Senator before election
Suleyman Kerimov
United Russia
Senator after election
Suleyman Kerimov
United Russia

The 2026 People's Assembly of the Republic of Dagestan election took place on 18–20 September 2026, on common election day, coinciding with the 2026 Russian legislative election. All 90 seats in the People's Assembly were up for re-election. The newly elected People's Assembly also will elect the next Head of Dagestan during its first session.

United Russia retained its overwhelming majority in the People's Assembly, winning 74% of the vote. A Just Russia and Communist Party of the Russian Federation also retained their factions in the People's Assembly without seat changes.

== Electoral system ==
Under current election laws, the People's Assembly is elected for a term of five years by party-list proportional representation with a 5% electoral threshold. Seats are allocated using the Imperiali quota, modified to ensure that every party list, which passes the threshold, receives at least one mandate.

== Candidates ==
=== Party lists ===
To register regional lists of candidates, parties need to collect 0.5% of signatures of all registered voters in Dagestan.

The following parties were relieved from the necessity to collect signatures:

- United Russia
- Communist Party of the Russian Federation
- Liberal Democratic Party of Russia
- A Just Russia
- New People
- Rodina

№	Party	Republic-wide list	Candidates	Territorial groups	Status
1	United Russia	Fyodor Shchukin • Suleyman Kerimov • Zaur Askenderov • Khantemir Sultanov • Yelena Pavlyuchenko • Marat Saidov • Dzhamal Aliyev • Arsen Pirmagomedov • Shikhtimer Magomedov • Magomed Bagaudinov	228	62	Registered
2	Communist Party	Samir Abdulkhalikov • Murzadin Avezov • Magomed Gamzatov	180	62	Registered
3	Liberal Democratic Party	Abdulgamid Abdullayev • Murad Mutayev • Daniyal Gadzhiyev • Shakhnavaz Guseinov • Kamil Bugunnayev	124	53	Registered
4	A Just Russia	Kamil Davdiyev • Marat Aliyarov • Murat Paizulayev • Imam Ramazanov	167	62	Registered
5	New People	Paizula Dzhavatkhanov • Albert Selimov • Magomed Kurbanov • Murtazali Murtazaliyev • Temur Atayev • Ilyas Gadzhiyev • Abdulmedzhid Gazilayev • Zebiyula Sefibekov	82	53	Registered

Party of Growth, which participated in the last election, was dissolved and merged into New People.

== Results ==
Summary of the 18–20 September 2026 People's Assembly of the Republic of Dagestan election results
Party	Votes	%	±pp	Seats	+/–
United Russia	1,177,060	74.00	▲0.26	69	Steady
A Just Russia	190,681	11.99	▼0.72	11	Steady
Communist Party	174,878	10.99	▼0.63	10	Steady
Liberal Democratic Party	26,398	1.66	▲1.01	0	Steady
New People	16,900	1.06	New	0	New
Invalid ballots	4,700	0.30	▼0.39	—	—
Total	1,590,624	100.00	—	90	Steady
Turnout	1,590,624	91.57	▲7.22	—	—
Registered voters	1,736,991	100.00	—	—	—

Zaur Askenderov (United Russia) was re-elected as Chairman of the People's Assembly, while incumbent Senator Suleyman Kerimov (United Russia) was re-appointed to the Federation Council.

=== Members ===
Incumbent deputies are highlighted with bold, elected members who declined to take a seat are marked with ~~strikethrough~~.

Party lists
Member	Party
~~Fyodor Shchukin~~	United Russia
Suleyman Kerimov	United Russia
Zaur Askenderov	United Russia
Khantemir Sultanov	United Russia
Yelena Pavlyuchenko	United Russia
Marat Saidov	United Russia
Dzhamal Aliyev	United Russia
Arsen Pirmagomedov	United Russia
Shikhtimer Magomedov	United Russia
Magomed Bagaudinov	United Russia
Magomedali Gadzhiomarov	United Russia
Ali Murtazaliyev	United Russia
Sadrudin Aigubov	United Russia
Osman Abdulkerimov	United Russia
Abdulla Magomedov	United Russia
Aliaskhab Magomedov	United Russia
Ilyas Mamayev	United Russia
Bakhtiyar Akhmedov	United Russia
Khaibula Malachilov	United Russia
Mukhudin Mukhudinov	United Russia
Magomed Kudiyamagomedov	United Russia
Amir Abdulayev	United Russia
Gabibulla Gabibullayev	United Russia
Veliyulla Fataliyev	United Russia
Telman Ragimov	United Russia
Azad Gadzhiyev	United Russia
Marat Mirzekhanov	United Russia
Murad Muradov	United Russia
Timur Bagomedov	United Russia
~~Gadzhimurad Musayev~~	United Russia
Yusup Salibiyev	United Russia
Kurban Aliyev	United Russia
Magomedsalam Temirbolatov	United Russia
Timur Attoyev	United Russia
Asiyat Aliyeva	United Russia
Magomed Dzhafarov	United Russia
Zainula Gadzhiemenov	United Russia
Anna Bezrukova	United Russia
Nuridin Kakhirov	United Russia
Imran Avayev	United Russia
Yelena Yelnikova	United Russia
Artur Amutinov	United Russia
Mustapa Genzhekhanov	United Russia
Devletkhan Aliyev	United Russia
Marat Ilyasov	United Russia
Magomed Gaziyev	United Russia
Amirkhan Aliskerov	United Russia
Dzhavatkhan Atakov	United Russia
Omar Nagiyev	United Russia
Artur Israpilov	United Russia
Alibek Murzayev	United Russia
Gadzhimurad Ragimov	United Russia
Bilal Magomedov	United Russia
Eldis Minatullayev	United Russia
~~Dzhambulat Salavov~~	United Russia
Magomed Gasankhanov	United Russia
Rustam Babatov	United Russia
Imam Yaraliyev	United Russia
~~Magomed Kurbanov~~	United Russia
Makhach Zukhrabov	United Russia
~~Eduard Abdulkhalikov~~	United Russia
~~Muslim Akhmedov~~	United Russia
Ismail Tinamagomedov	United Russia
Magomed Magomedov	United Russia
Abdulmuslim Esenbulatov	United Russia
Visampasha Khanaliyev	United Russia
Arslanbek Alibekov	United Russia
~~Azamat Kadyrov~~	United Russia
Imran Islavov	United Russia
Daitbek Saipov	United Russia
~~Yarmet Yarmetov~~	United Russia
Rasim Gadzhiagayev	United Russia
Khuchbar Khuchbarov	United Russia
Abdurakhman Kamilov	United Russia
Magomed Sadulayev	United Russia
Magomed Asiyatilov	United Russia
Muslim Gindiyev	United Russia
Kamil Davdiyev	A Just Russia
Marat Aliyarov	A Just Russia
Murat Paizulayev	A Just Russia
Imam Ramazanov	A Just Russia
Zaur Eskenderov	A Just Russia
Akhmed Gashimov	A Just Russia
Akim Khanverdiyev	A Just Russia
Eldar Arbuliyev	A Just Russia
Timur Ibragimov	A Just Russia
Dzhamaludin Shigabudinov	A Just Russia
Farid Sambiyev	A Just Russia
Samir Abdulkhalikov	Communist Party
Murzadin Avezov	Communist Party
Magomed Gamzatov	Communist Party
Makhmuddibir Karimov	Communist Party
Kurban Magomedov	Communist Party
Nabigulla Magomedov	Communist Party
Firudin Radzhabov	Communist Party
Magomed Yunusov	Communist Party
Abdurakhman Saidov	Communist Party
Aslanbeg Dalgatov	Communist Party

== See also ==
- 2026 Russian regional elections
