= List of chairmen of the People's Assembly of the Republic of Dagestan =

List of chairmen of the People's Assembly of the Republic of Dagestan.

The People's Assembly of Dagestan succeeded the Supreme Council as the legislature in 1995.

This is a list of chairmen (speakers) of the Supreme Council 1990–1995:

Name	Entered office	Left office
Magomedali Magomedov	April 24, 1990	July 26, 1994
Mukhu Aliyev	August 16, 1994	1995

This is a list of chairmen (speakers) of the People's Assembly of the Republic of Dagestan from 1995:

Name	Entered office	Left office
Mukhu Aliyev	April 18, 1995	February 20, 2006
Magomedsalam Magomedov	February 20, 2006	March 11, 2007
Magomed Suleymanov	April 4, 2007	March 24, 2010
Magomed-Sultan Magomedov	March 24, 2010	February 7, 2013
Khizri Shikhsaydov	February 7, 2013	September 29, 2021
Zaur Askenderov	September 30, 2021	
