= Ramazan Abdulatipov =

Avar politician

- Рамазан ГӀабдулатӏипов; Рамазан Абдулатипов
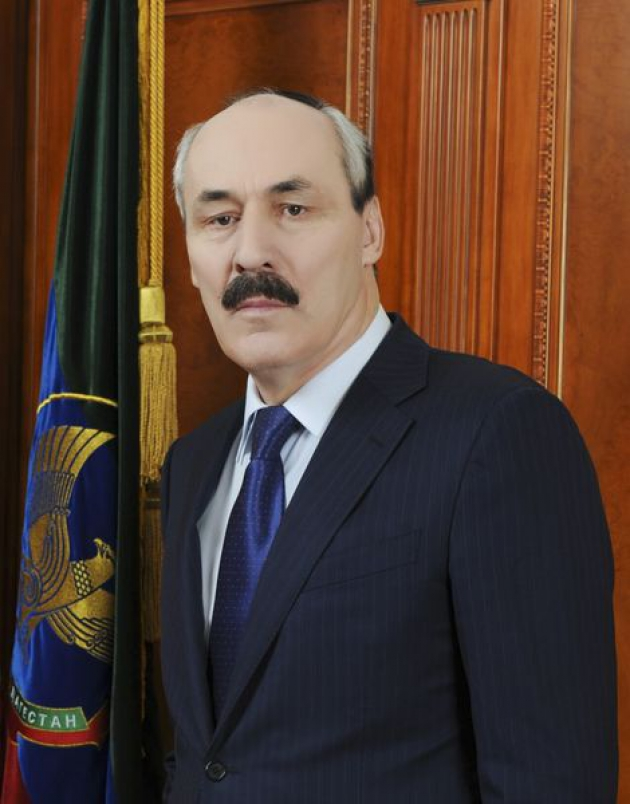
- Official portrait, 2008

4th Head of the Republic of Dagestan
- In office 28 January 2013 (acting until 8 September 2013) – 3 October 2017
- President: Vladimir Putin
- Preceded by: Magomedsalam Magomedov
- Succeeded by: Vladimir Vasilyev

Minister of National Policy
- In office 25 September 1998 – 25 May 1999
- Premier: Yevgeny Primakov; Sergei Stepashin
- Preceded by: Established
- Succeeded by: abolished

Deputy Chairman of the Federation Council of Russia
- In office 14 January 1994 – 15 January 1996
- Preceded by: None–post established
- Succeeded by: Valeryan Viktorov

Personal details
- Born: Ramazan Gadzhimuradovich Abdulatipov; 4 August 1946 (age 80) Gebguda, Tlyaratinsky District, Russian SFSR, Soviet Union
- Party: Communist Party of the Soviet Union (until 1991); Party of Russian Unity and Accord; United Russia
- Spouse: Inna Abdulatipova
- Education: Dagestan State University
- Occupation: Civil servant, statesman
- Awards: ,
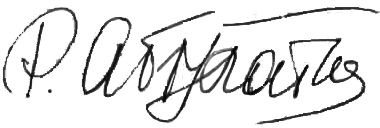
- Signature

Ramazan Gadzhimuradovich Abdulatipov (Avar: Рамазан ХӀажимурадил ГӀабдулатӏипов; Russian: Рамаза́н Гаджимура́дович Абдулати́пов; born 4 August 1946) is a Russian politician and professor. He served as Head of the Republic of Dagestan from 28 January 2013 until his resignation effective 3 October 2017.

== Biography ==
From 1990–1993 he was Chairman of the Council of Nationalities, a chamber of the Supreme Soviet of the Russian SFSR. In 1991 he was a candidate for Vice President of Russia. During the September–October crisis of 1993, he condemned president Yeltsin's decree dissolving the Congress of People's Deputies of Russia, and was one of the members of the Supreme Soviet delegation in talks with the pro-presidential side.

From May 2005 to 6 March 2009, Abdulatipov served as Ambassador of Russia to Tajikistan.

From 20 December 2018 - Special Representative of the Russian Federation to the Organization of Islamic Cooperation in Jeddah, Kingdom of Saudi Arabia. Retired July 17, 2023.

== Awards ==
- Order of Friendship (1997)
- Order "For Merit to the Fatherland" (2016)
- Order of Alexander Nevsky (2017)
- Order of Honour (Russia) (2011)
- Order For Services to the Republic of Dagestan (2011)
- Dostlug Order (2016)
- Medal "In Commemoration of the 850th Anniversary of Moscow"

== Publications ==
Photographed with Vladimir Putin at the State Historical Museum, 2015.

He is the author of a number of scholarly and journalistic articles published in journals such as Voprosy Filosofii(Problems of Philosophy), Voprosy istorii KPSS (Issues of the History of the CPSU), Dialog, as well as in local periodicals. He also wrote several monographs and books, including:

- (with T. Yu. Burmistrova) The Constitution of the USSR and National Relations at the Present Stage. Moscow: Mysl, 1978. 134 p.
- (with T. Yu. Burmistrova) Lenin’s Policy of Internationalism in the USSR: History and Contemporary Issues.Moscow: Mysl, 1982. 266 p.
- Internationalism and the Spiritual and Moral Development of the Peoples of Dagestan. Makhachkala: Dagestani Book Publishing House, 1984. 79 p.
- Way of Life. Ideology. Youth. Murmansk: Book Publishing House, 1987. 76 p.
- The Nature and Paradoxes of the National "Self". Moscow: Mysl, 1991. 169 p.
- Man, Nation, Society. Moscow: Politizdat, 1991. 224 p.
- A Conspiracy Against the Nation: The National and the Nationalist in the Fate of Peoples. St. Petersburg: Lenizdat, 1992.
- (with L. F. Boltenkova, Yu. F. Yarov) Federalism in the History of Russia. Books 1–3. Moscow, 1992–1993.
- Power and Conscience: Politicians and Peoples in the Labyrinths of Troubled Times. Moscow: Slavyansky Dialog, 1994. 286 p.
- (with L. F. Boltenkova) Experiments of Federalism. Moscow: Respublika, 1994.
- On the Federal and National Policy of the Russian State. Moscow, 1995.
- Paradoxes of Sovereignty. Prospects of the Individual, Nation, and State. Moscow, 1995. 224 p.
- The Russian Nation: National-Political Problems of the 20th Century and the All-Russian National Idea. Moscow, 1995. 247 p. (2nd ed. 2005).
- Russia on the Threshold of the 21st Century: The State and Prospects of the Federal Structure. Moscow: Slavyansky Dialog, 1996.
- (with V. A. Mikhailov, A. A. Chichanovsky) National Policy of the Russian Federation: From Conception to Implementation. Moscow: Slavyansky Dialog, 1997.
- The Sign of Destiny. Moscow, 1998.
- Russian Federalism: The Experience of Formation and Strategy of Perspectives. Moscow, 1998 (editor).
- Power and Conscience. Book 2. Russia and Dagestan, My Life and Hopes. Moscow: Slavyansky Dialog, 1999.
- Small Peoples of Russia: State-Legal Mechanisms of Protection and Development. Moscow: Slavyansky Dialog, 1999.
- Nation and Nationalism: Good and Evil in the National Question. Moscow: Slavyansky Dialog, 1999.
- Dagestan in the Hour of Trial: Lessons of Aggression and Feat. Moscow, 2000.
- The National Question and the State Structure of Russia. Moscow: Slavyansky Dialog, 2000–2001.
- From the Ancestral Tower to the Gates of the Kremlin: Inscriptions. Moscow: Echo Kavkaza, 2001.
- Managing Ethnopolitical Processes: Issues of Theory and Practice. Moscow: Slavyansky Dialog, 2001.
- The Fate of Islam in Russia: History and Prospects. Moscow: Mysl, 2002.
- Ethnopolitology. St. Petersburg: Piter, 2004.
- My Tatar People. Moscow: Klassiks Stil, 2005.
- The Will to Death: The Philosophy of the Crisis of the Global Human. Moscow, 2007.
- Manifesto of Ethnonational Policy of the Russian Federation. Moscow: Klassik Stil, 2007.
- My Bashkir People. Moscow: Klassiks Stil, 2007.
- Ethnonational Policy in the Russian Federation. Moscow, 2007.
- The Caucasus: History, Peoples, Culture, Religions. Moscow: Vostochnaya Literatura, 2007 (editor).
- Experiments in Poetic Philosophy. 2nd revised and expanded edition. Moscow, 2015. 304 p. ISBN 5-7834-0158-7.
- The Russian Caucasus: Problems, Searches, Solutions. Moscow, 2015 (editor, with A.-N. Z. Dibirov).
- People of My Destiny. Moscow: Fond Knizhny Soyuz, 2016. 328 p. ISBN 978-5-901001-02-8.
- The Springs of Mind and Soul. Moscow: Fond Knizhny Soyuz; Makhachkala: [s.n.], 2016. 749 p. ISBN 978-5-901001-05-9.
- Russia in the 21st Century: A Nationwide Answer to the National Question. Moscow, 2016.

== Personal life ==
Abdulatipov is married to Inna Abdulatipova (née Kalinina). It was reported that in 2014, their income amounted to almost 3,9 million rubles. They owned three land plots, three country houses, and half of a 100-square-meters apartment.

The Abdulatipovs have two sons and a daughter.

Abdulatipov has a brother, Rajab. From 2006 to 2016, he was the head of the migration service in the Republic of Dagestan. Since September 2016, Rajab Abdulatipov worked as a deputy of the People's Assembly of the Republic of Dagestan. Also, he was a chairman of the republican Committee of Education, Science and Culture. Rajab Abdulatipov was detained in September 2018 for collaborating with a criminal organization.

Political offices
| Preceded by Magomedsalam Magomedov | Head of the Republic of Dagestan; 2013–2017 | Succeeded by Vladimir Vasilyev |
