= Shamil Zainalov =

Russian politician (born 1946)

- Шамиль Зайналов
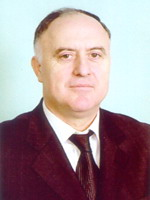

Chairman of the Government of Dagestan
- In office 6 March 2006 – 24 February 2010
- Preceded by: Atai Aliev
- Succeeded by: Magomed Abdulaev

Senator from Dagestan
- In office 29 November 2001 – 24 March 2006
- Succeeded by: Atai Aliev

Personal details
- Born: Shamil Zainalov; 14 November 1946 (age 79) Khasavyurt, Dagestan Autonomous Soviet Socialist Republic, Soviet Union
- Party: United Russia
- Education: Dagestan State University

Shamil Magomedovich Zainalov (Russian: Шамиль Магомедович Зайналов; born 14 November 1946) is a Russian politician who served as the prime minister of Dagestan from 2006 to 2010. Previously, he served as a senator from Dagestan from 2001 to 2006.

== Career ==
Shamil Zainalov was born on 14 November 1946 in Khasavyurt, Dagestan Autonomous Soviet Socialist Republic. He is Kumyk by ethnicity. Zainalov graduated from the Dagestan State University and after that worked as the chief architect of Khasavyurt. Later, he was appointed the head of the Khasavyurt city administration. From 1998 to 2001, he served as Minister of Industry and Trade of the Republic of Dagestan. From 2001 to 2006, he served as senator from Dagestan. He left this position to become the new prime minister of Dagestan.
