= Ilyushechkin =

Ilyushechkin (feminine: Ilyusheckina) is a surname. Notable people with the surname include:

- Liubov Ilyushechkina (born 1991), Canadian pair skater
- Vasily Ilyushechkin (1915–1996), Soviet Russian historian and orientalist
