= Mukhu Aliyev =

Russian politician

- Муху Алиев; Мухӏу Гӏалиев
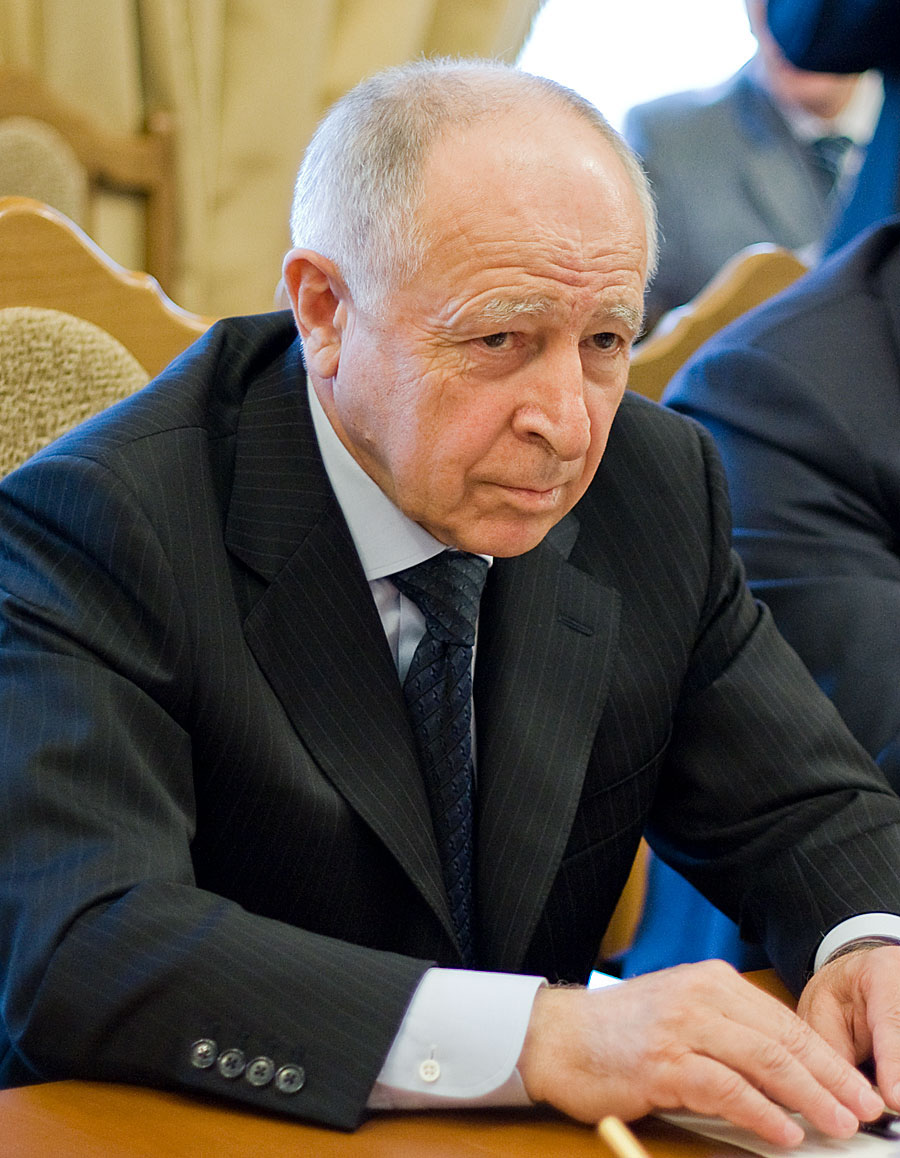
- Aliyev in 2015

2nd Head of the Republic of Dagestan
- In office 20 February 2006 – 20 February 2010
- President: Vladimir Putin; Dmitry Medvedev
- Preceded by: Magomedali Magomedov
- Succeeded by: Magomedsalam Magomedov

Personal details
- Born: 6 August 1940 (age 86) Khunzakhsky, Dagestan ASSR, Russian SFSR, Soviet Union
- Party: Non-Partisan
- Education: Dagestan State University
- Profession: Philologist

Mukhu Gimbatovich Aliyev (Russian: Муху́ Гимба́тович Али́ев, Russian pronunciation: [mʊˈxu ɡʲɪmˈbatəvʲɪtɕ ɐˈlʲiɪf]; Avar: МухӀу Гьимбатил ГӀалиев; born 6 August 1940) is a Russian politician who served as the 2nd Head of the Republic of Dagestan, a federal subject of Russia. He was born in the village of Tanusi, Khunzakhsky District, Dagestan ASSR, Russian SFSR, Soviet Union. Ethnically, he is Avar. He was the speaker of the Republic's parliament before being accepted as the President by the Dagestan parliament on 20 February 2006, having been nominated by the Russian president Vladimir Putin to replace Dagestan's long-time leader Magomedali Magomedov.

Aliyev was succeeded by Magomedsalam Magomedov on 20 February 2010. In line with the Russian Federation's constitution, Magomedov was nominated by President Dmitry Medvedev and approved by the People's Assembly of Dagestan.

== Honours and awards ==
- Order "For Merit to the Fatherland":
  - 2nd class (18 February 2010) – for services to the state and personal contribution to the socio-economic development of the republic
  - 3rd class (14 November 2005) – for outstanding contribution to strengthening Russian statehood and the merits of legislative activity
  - 4th class (25 December 2000) – for his courage and dedication shown during the performance of their civic duty to protect the constitutional order of the Republic of Dagestan, strengthening friendship and cooperation between nations and years of diligent work
- Order of the Red Banner of Labour
- Order of the Badge of Honour

== Major achievements ==
Although reign of Mukhu Aliyev was smooth without any major breakthroughs Mukhu is famous in Dagestan in standing against transfer of two villages located on Russia/Azerbaijan border to Azerbaijan.

Political offices
Preceded by Magomedali Magomedov	President of Dagestan; 2006–2010	Succeeded by Magomedsalam Magomedov
