= Fyodor Shchukin =

Russian politician (born 1976)

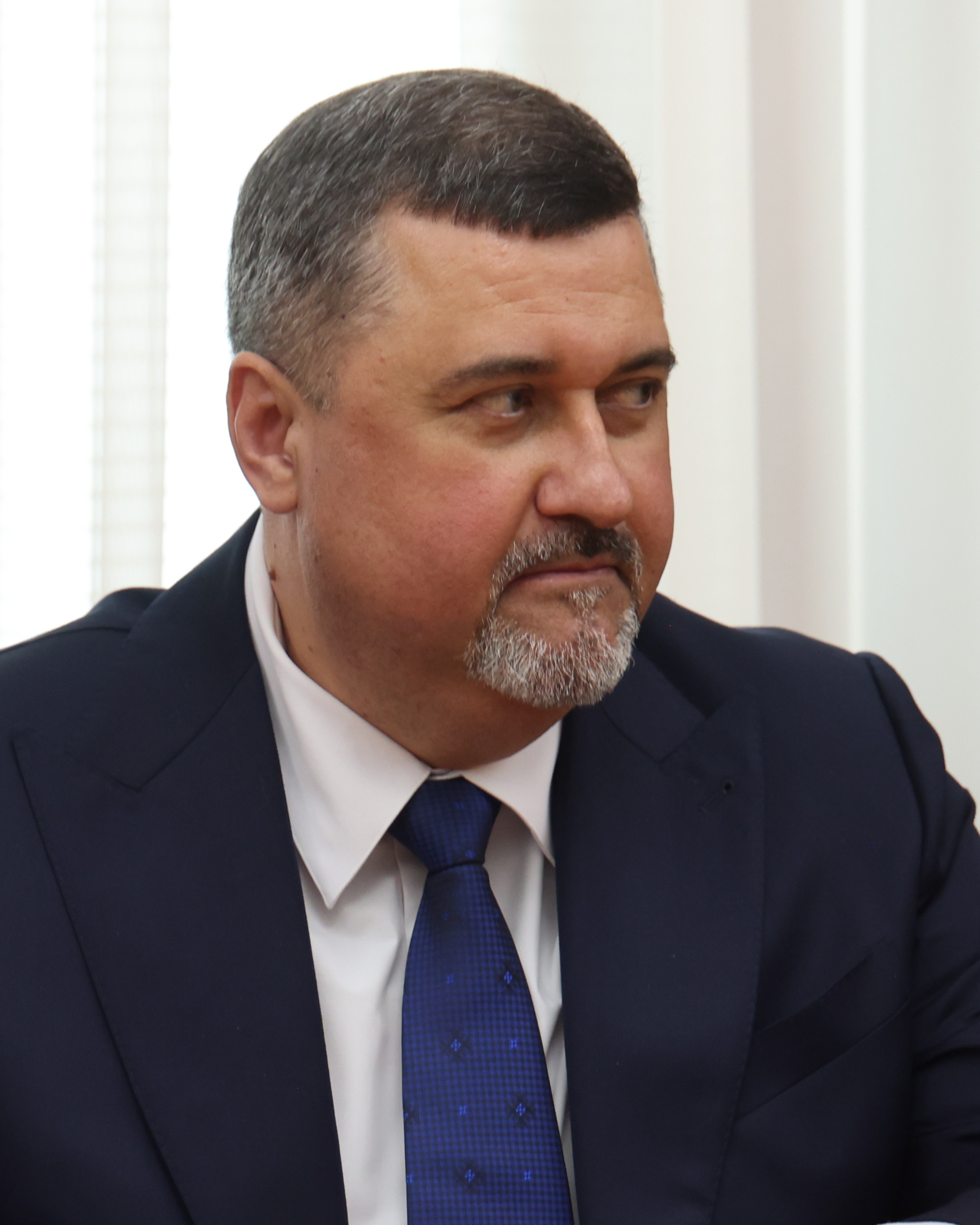
- Shchukin in 2026

Acting Head of the Republic of Dagestan
- Incumbent
- Assumed office 4 May 2026
- President: Vladimir Putin
- Preceded by: Sergey Melikov

Chief Justice of Dagestan
- In office February 2024 – 4 May 2026
- Preceded by: Sergey Suvorov
- Succeeded by: Alexander Gudimov (acting)

Deputy of the Zemstvo Assembly of the Pochinkovsky district
- In office 15 September 2000 – 19 September 2004

Personal details
- Born: 4 August 1976 (age 50) Pochinki, Russian SFSR, Soviet Union
- Party: Independent
- Education: University of Nizhny Novgorod
- Profession: Lawyer, judge

Fyodor Vyacheslavovich Shchukin (Russian: Фёдор Вячеславович Щукин; born 4 August 1976) is a Russian politician and former judge serving as acting head of the Republic of Dagestan since 2026. From 2024 to 2026, he served as chief judge of Dagestan's supreme court.

== Biography ==
Fyodor Shchukin was born on 4 August 1976, in the village of Pochinki, Pochinkovsky District, Nizhny Novgorod Oblast. He is ethnic Russian.

In 1997, he obtained a law degree at Nizhny Novgorod State University. In 2002, he earned a degree in public administration at Mordovian State University.

He began his legal practice in 1995. From 2004, he served as a magistrate in Pochinkovsky District, and from 2005 as a judge of a district court. In 2013, he became the chief judge of the Semyonovsky District Court. In 2020, he was appointed deputy chief judge of the Nizhny Novgorod Oblast Court.

From February 2024, he served as the chief judge of the Supreme Court of the Republic of Dagestan. On 30 April 2026, President Vladimir Putin endorsed the candidacy of Fyodor Shchukin for the office of Head of the Republic, as proposed by the People's Assembly of the Republic of Dagestan. On 4 May 2026, the Higher Judges' Qualifications Board accepted his resignation "due to honorable retirement", and that same day the Russian president appointed Shchukin as acting head of Dagestan.
