= Umalatov =

Umalatov or Umalatova is a surname. Notable people with the surname include:

- Alipasha Umalatov (1927–2022), Russian politician
- Gasan Umalatov (born 1982), Russian mixed martial artist
- Sazhi Umalatova (born 1953), Russian politician
- Magomed Umalatov (born 1992), Russian mixed martial artist
