= Vasily Ilyushechkin =

Russian historian

- Born: 23 October 1915; Pochinki, Pochinkovsky District, Nizhny Novgorod Oblast
- Occupation: Sinologist, orientalist, historian, philosopher

Vasily Pavlovich Ilyushechkin (Russian: Василий Павлович Илюшечкин; 1915–1996) was a Soviet Russian historian and orientalist, Doctor of Sciences in Historical Sciences (1966), Doctor of Sciences in Philosophical Sciences (1988).

Vasily Ilyushechkin was born into a peasant family in a supernumerary town in Pochinki, Pochinkovsky District, Nizhny Novgorod Oblast, in April 1915. He graduated from the Faculty of History at Leningrad State University in 1939. He was drafted into the Red Army in 1940 and served as an instructor for 53rd Army. He was demobilized in 1945 with the rank of Senior lieutenant. He was awarded the Order of the Patriotic War, First Class, and the Medal "For the Victory over Japan". After demobilization, he entered graduate school at the Leningrad State University. In 1952, he defended his candidate's dissertation. From 1950 to 1988 he worked at the Institute of Oriental Studies of the Russian Academy of Sciences. In 1966, he defended his doctoral thesis on the history of the Taiping Rebellion. He studied the history of the CCP. He contributed to the development of formation theory. His books were published by Nauka.
