= Alipasha Umalatov =

Russian politician (1927–2022)

Chairman of the Presidium of the Supreme Soviet of the Dagestan ASSR
- In office 19 December 1978 – August 1987
- Preceded by: Shakhrudin Shamkhalov
- Succeeded by: Magomedali Magomedov

Chairman of the Council of Ministers of the Dagestan ASSR
- In office 29 November 1967 – 19 December 1978
- Preceded by: Magomed-Salam Umakhanov
- Succeeded by: Magomed Yusupov

Personal details
- Born: Alipasha Dzhalalovich Umalatov; 1 May 1927 Karabudakhkent, Dagestan ASSR, Russian SFSR, Soviet Union
- Died: 22 June 2022 (aged 95) Makhachkala, Dagestan, Russia
- Party: CPSU (1947–1991)

Alipasha Dzhalalovich Umalatov (Russian: Алипаша́ Джала́лович Умала́тов; 1 May 1927 – 21 June 2022) was a Russian politician.

A member of the Communist Party of the Soviet Union, he served as Chairman of the Council of Ministers of the Dagestan ASSR from 1967 to 1978 and Chairman of the Presidium of the Supreme Soviet of the Dagestan ASSR from 1978 to 1987.

Umalatov died in Makhachkala on 21 June 2022 at the age of 95.
