= Magomedsalam Magomedov =

Russian politician

- Магомедсалам Магомедов
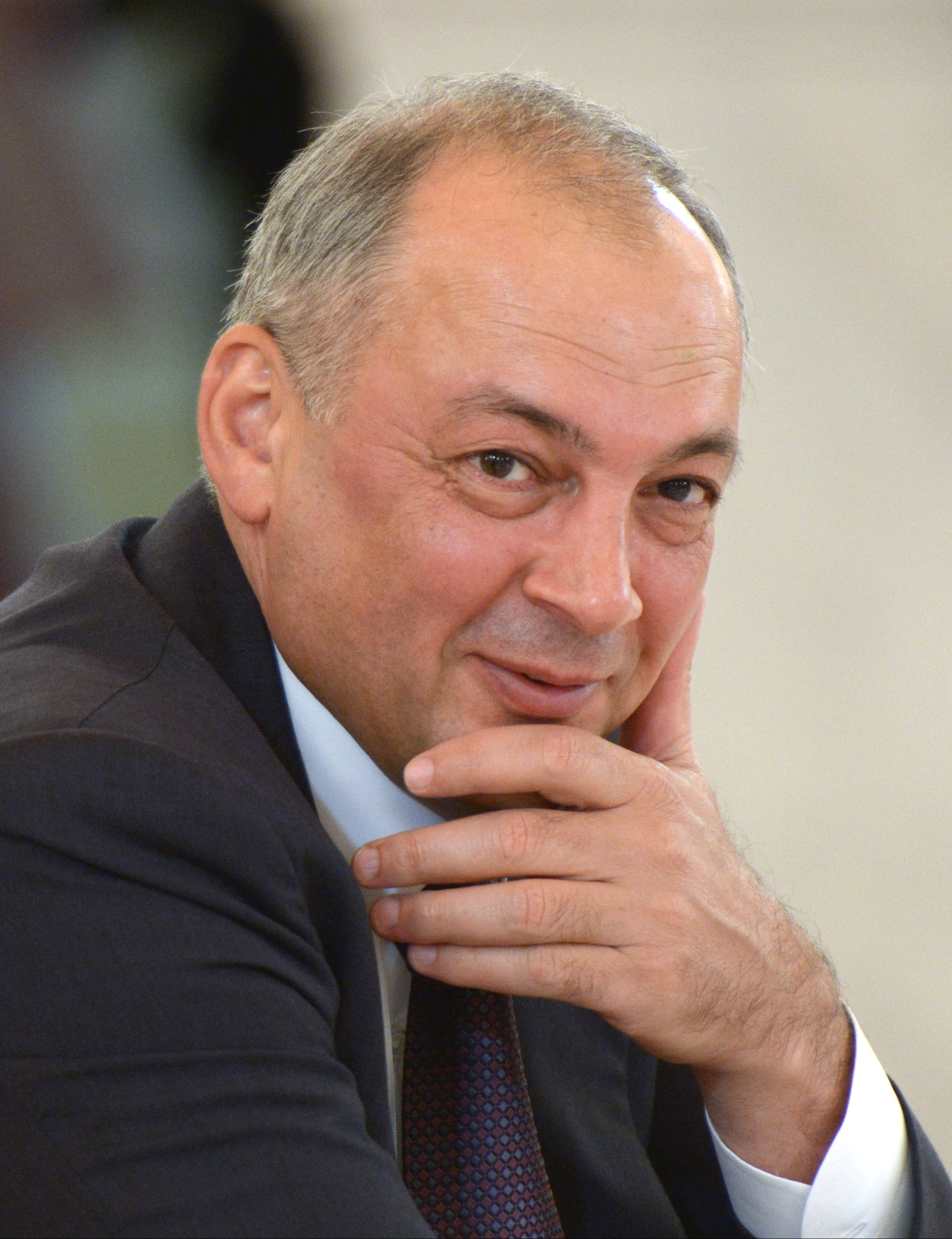
- Magomedov in 2014

Deputy Chief of Staff of the Presidential Administration of Russia
- In office 28 January 2013 – 7 May 2024

3rd Head of the Republic of Dagestan
- In office 20 February 2010 – 28 January 2013
- President: Dmitry Medvedev; Vladimir Putin
- Preceded by: Mukhu Aliyev
- Succeeded by: Ramazan Abdulatipov

Personal details
- Born: 1 June 1964 (age 62) Levashi, Dagestan ASSR, Russian SFSR, Soviet Union
- Party: United Russia
- Education: Dagestan State University
- Profession: Economist
- Website: Official website

Magomedsalam Magomedaliyevich Magomedov (Russian: Магомедсалам Магомедалиевич Магомедов; Dargwa: Мяхӏяммадгӏялила урши Мяхӏяммадсялам; born 1 June 1964) is a Russian politician who served as the 3rd Head of the Republic of Dagestan, a federal subject of the Russian Federation found in the North Caucasus region, from 2010 to 2013. His appointment by the President of Russia Dmitry Medvedev was approved by the parliament of Dagestan on 10 February 2010. Magomedov is an ethnic Dargin. His father, Magomedali Magomedov, served as President of Dagestan between 1987 and 2006. It is his stated ambition as president to consolidate and modernise the republic to counter the threat of Islamic extremism, in particular the attempts made to undermine and terrorise the republic by supporters of the so-called Caucasus Emirate. His resignation was accepted by President Vladimir Putin on 28 January 2013. After that he was appointed Deputy Head of the Administration of the President of the Russian Federation. He has the federal state civilian service rank of 1st class Active State Councillor of the Russian Federation.

Magomedsalam Magomedov has an academic background and differs from his predecessors who were Soviet-era Communist Party leaders who adapted to changed circumstances. Prior to the presidency, Magomedsalam Magomedov was elected speaker of Dagestan’s parliament in 2006 for a period of one year.

He speaks Dargin, Russian, and English.

In 2001-2002, Magomedov was vice president of FC Anzhi.

In 2010, Magomedov made the fifth pillar of Islam, the hajj, and met with Deputy Prime Minister and Minister of Interior of the Kingdom of Saudi Arabia Prince Nayef bin Abdulaziz at the residence of Abdullah of Saudi Arabia.

On 4 December 2010 his brother boarded Dagestan Airlines Flight 372 and was killed along with another passenger after the plane crashed during an emergency landing at Moscow's Domodedovo Airport.

Political offices
Preceded by Mukhu Aliyev	President of Dagestan; 2010–2013	Succeeded by Ramazan Abdulatipov; Acting
