= Ilyas Umakhanov =

Russian politician

- Ильяс Умаханов
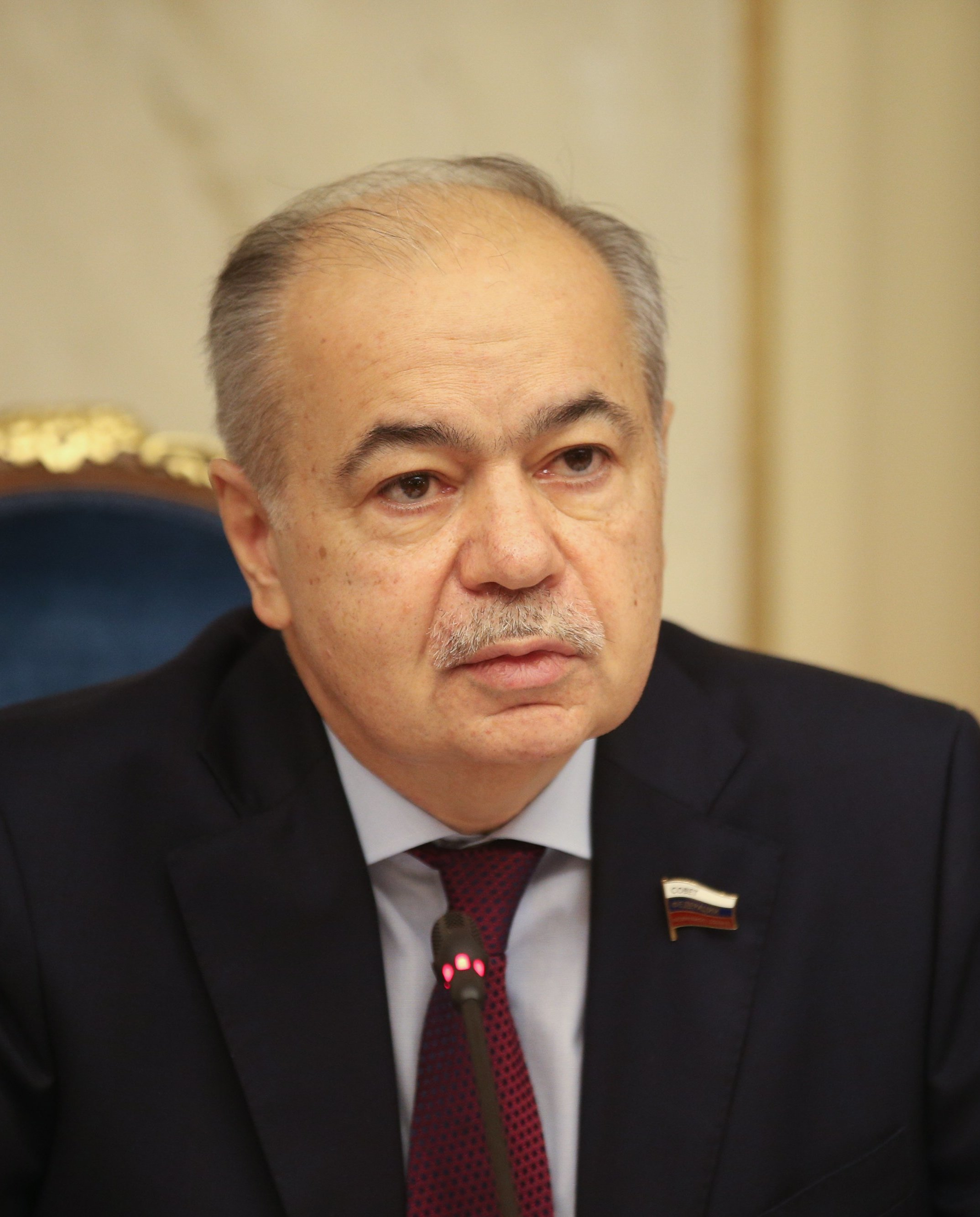
- Umakhanov in 2021

Deputy Chairman of the Federation Council
- In office 15 December 2010 – 17 March 2021

Russian Federation Senator from the Republic of Dagestan
- Incumbent
- Assumed office 29 November 2001
- Preceded by: Seat established

Personal details
- Born: Ilyas Magomed-Salamovich Umakhanov; 27 March 1957 (age 69) Makhachkala, Russian SFSR, Soviet Union
- Party: United Russia

Ilyas Magomed-Salamovich Umakhanov (Russian: Ильяс Магомед-Саламович Умаханов; born 27 March 1957) is a Russian politician, who was the Deputy Chairman of the Federation Council from 2010 to 2021, and serves as a senator of the executive power of the Republic of Dagestan since 2001.

== Biography ==
Ilyas Umakhanov was born on 27 March 1957 in Makhachkala, to his father, Magomed-Salam Umakhanov.

In 1979, he graduated with honors from the Moscow State Institute of International Relations as a specialist in international relations with knowledge of a foreign language.

In 1979, he worked as a referent for the second European department of the USSR Ministry of Foreign Affairs. From 1981 to 1991, he was in the apparatus of the Central Committee of the Komsomol.

In 1987, he defended at Moscow State University a dissertation for the degree of candidate of philosophical sciences.

In the early 1990s, he was president of JSC "Center for International Cooperation", then chairman of the board of directors of the Russian-Arab University.

In December 1993, Umakhanov ran for the State Duma in a single-mandate district. From 1994 to 1995, he headed the Irdag Investment and Industrial Corporation in Makhachkala.

In 1995, Umakhanov was elected to the People's Assembly of Dagestan. He headed the committee on budget, finance and taxes.

In March 1998, Umakhanov was appointed Deputy Prime Minister of Dagestan. He supervised the economy, religion and interethnic relations.

In April 1998, a car was blown up in Makhachkala near Umakhanov's service Volga. Umakhanov was uninjured. In March 2000, Umakhanov's car was fired upon from a grenade launcher.

In 2001 he graduated from the Dagestan State Institute of National Economy as an economist.

On 29 November 2001, Umakhanov became a senator, representing Dagestan on executive authority in the Federation Council. In February 2010, deputies of the People's Assembly extended his term of office in the Federation Council.

From December 2010 to 17 March 2021, he was Vice Speaker of the Federation Council.

He headed the Interim Commission of the Federation Council for monitoring the participation of the Russian Federation in the World Trade Organization and the World Customs Organization.

He is a member of the Interdepartmental Commission of the Russian Federation for the Affairs of the Council of Europe, the Public Council of the North Caucasian Federal District, and the Commission on Religious Associations under the Government of Russia. He is a hajj commissioner.

He is the president of the Russian Committee for Solidarity and Cooperation with the Peoples of Asia and Africa.

He is married and has two sons and a daughter.

== Sanctions ==
He was sanctioned by the UK government in 2022 in relation to the Russo-Ukrainian War.

In December 2022 the EU sanctioned Ilyas Umakhanov in relation to the 2022 Russian invasion of Ukraine.
