= Gebguda =

Gebguda Гебгуда Гъебгъуда
- Selo
- Location within Republic of Dagestan Location within Russia
- Coordinates: 42°11′N 46°21′E
- Country: Russia
- Region: Republic of Dagestan
- District: Tlyaratinsky District
- Time zone: UTC+3:00

Gebguda (Russian: Гебгуда; Avar: Гъебгъуда) is a rural locality (a selo) in Khidibsky Selsoviet, Tlyaratinsky District, Republic of Dagestan, Russia. Population: 47 (2010 census); 80 (2002 census); 150 (1989 Soviet census).

== Geography ==
Gebguda is located 16 km north of Tlyarata (the district's administrative centre) by road. Khorta is the nearest rural locality.
