= Tanusi =

Tanusi Тануси
- Selo
- Location within Republic of Dagestan Location within Russia
- Coordinates: 42°34′N 46°41′E
- Country: Russia
- Region: Republic of Dagestan
- District: Khunzakhsky District
- Time zone: UTC+3:00

Tanusi (Russian: Тануси) is a rural locality (a selo) and the administrative center of Tanusinsky Selsoviet, Khunzakhsky District, Republic of Dagestan, Russia. Population: 512 (2010 census); 513 (2002 census); 449 (1989 Soviet census). There are 8 streets in this selo.

== Geography ==
It is located 5 km from Khunzakh (the district's administrative centre), 79 km from Makhachkala (capital of Dagestan) and 1,642 km from Moscow. Oboda is the nearest rural locality.
