= 2026 Dagestan flood =

Natural disaster in Russia

Dagestan flood
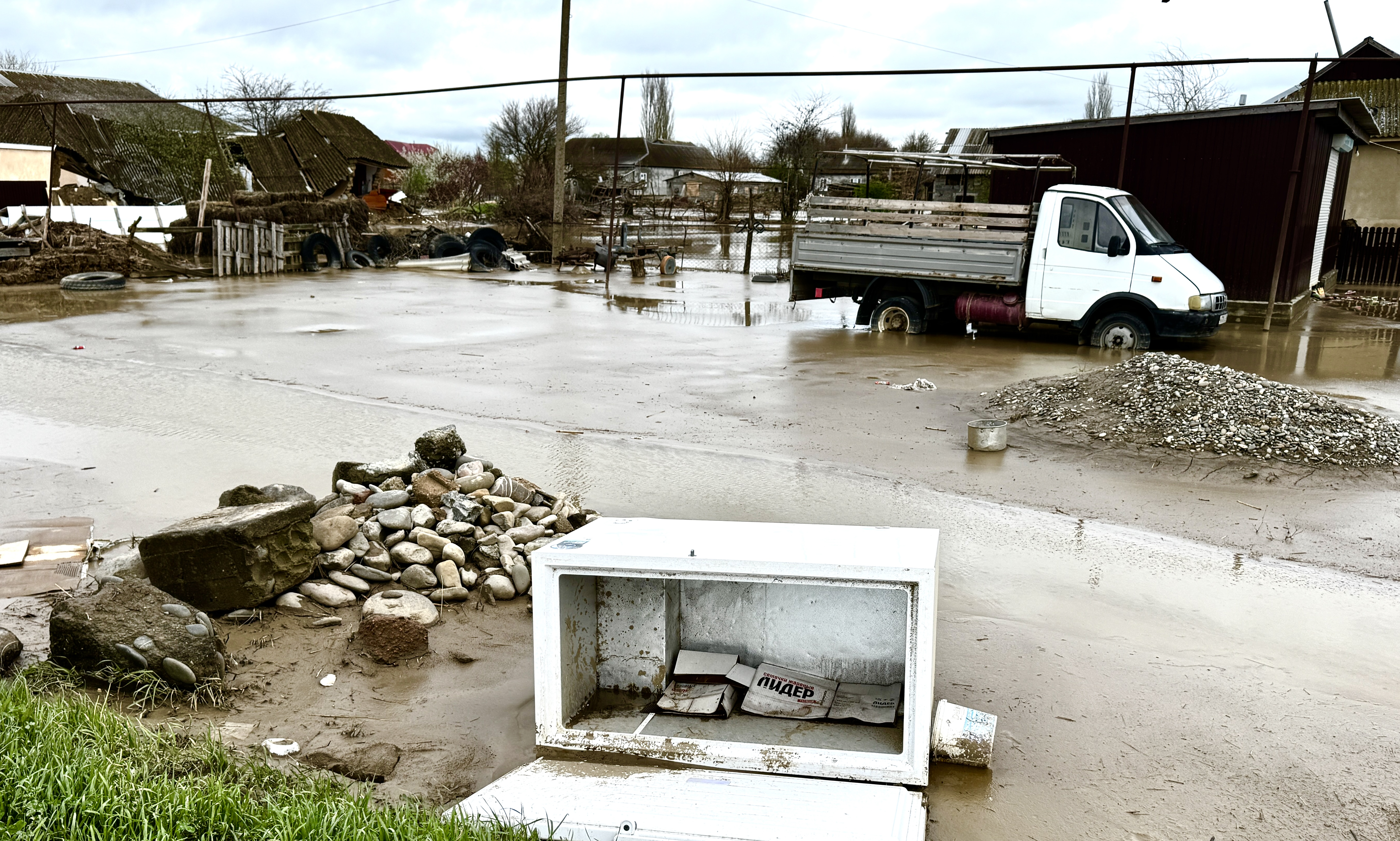
- Village (selo) Adilotar after the second flooding.
- Native name: Наводнение в Дагестане
- Date: 28 March 2026 — 31 March 2026
- Location: Dagestan; Russia; Republic of Dagestan; Makhachkala; Khasavyurt; Kaspiysk; Khasavyurtovsky District; Tlyaratinsky District; Babayurtovsky District; Tsumadinsky District; Derbentsky District
- Cause: heavy rainfall and landslides
- Deaths: 7
- Injuries: unknown
- Missing: unknown
- Property damage: unknown

2026 Dagestan flood is large-scale natural disaster in Republic of Dagestan (Russia), caused by anomalous heavy rainfall in the period from March 27 to 29, 2026. The flood affected the capital, central and seaside regions of the republic, becoming one of the largest floods in the region in the last hundred years. During the flood, three distribution substations were destroyed, and two railway spans also collapsed bridges.

== Reasons ==
According to the researcher Russian Academy of Sciences Mikhail Bolgov, the flood occurred due to the coincidence of the insufficient capacity of the storm drain and abnormal floods:

It's important to understand that city sewer networks aren't designed for such rare events—storm drains aren't prepared for heavy downpours. Therefore, in Dagestan, two factors could have coincided: extreme amounts of water, which leaves little control over infrastructure, or, of course, various deviations from standards were observed during urban development.

The city administration also reported about floods.

== Chronology of events ==
On March 28, heavy rainfall fell on Dagestan. According to the statement of the head of the region Sergey Melikov, the level of precipitation exceeded the record for the last hundred and seven years. Due to heavy precipitation, the rivers overflowed their banks, an emergency was introduced in Makhachkala position. 283 settlements were cut off. 83 people were evacuated. In the Tlyaratyn and Tsumadyn districts they left avalanches.
On March 29, the water level fell in the cities of Khasavyurt and Derbent, the Kasumkent-Zukhrabkent road is open. As of 12:30 p.m., 248 settlements remained without electricity. 544 houses were freed from the water, 235 houses were flooded.
On March 30, payments were announced victims.
