= Pochinkovsky District, Nizhny Novgorod Oblast =

Pochinkovsky District Починковский район (Russian)
- District
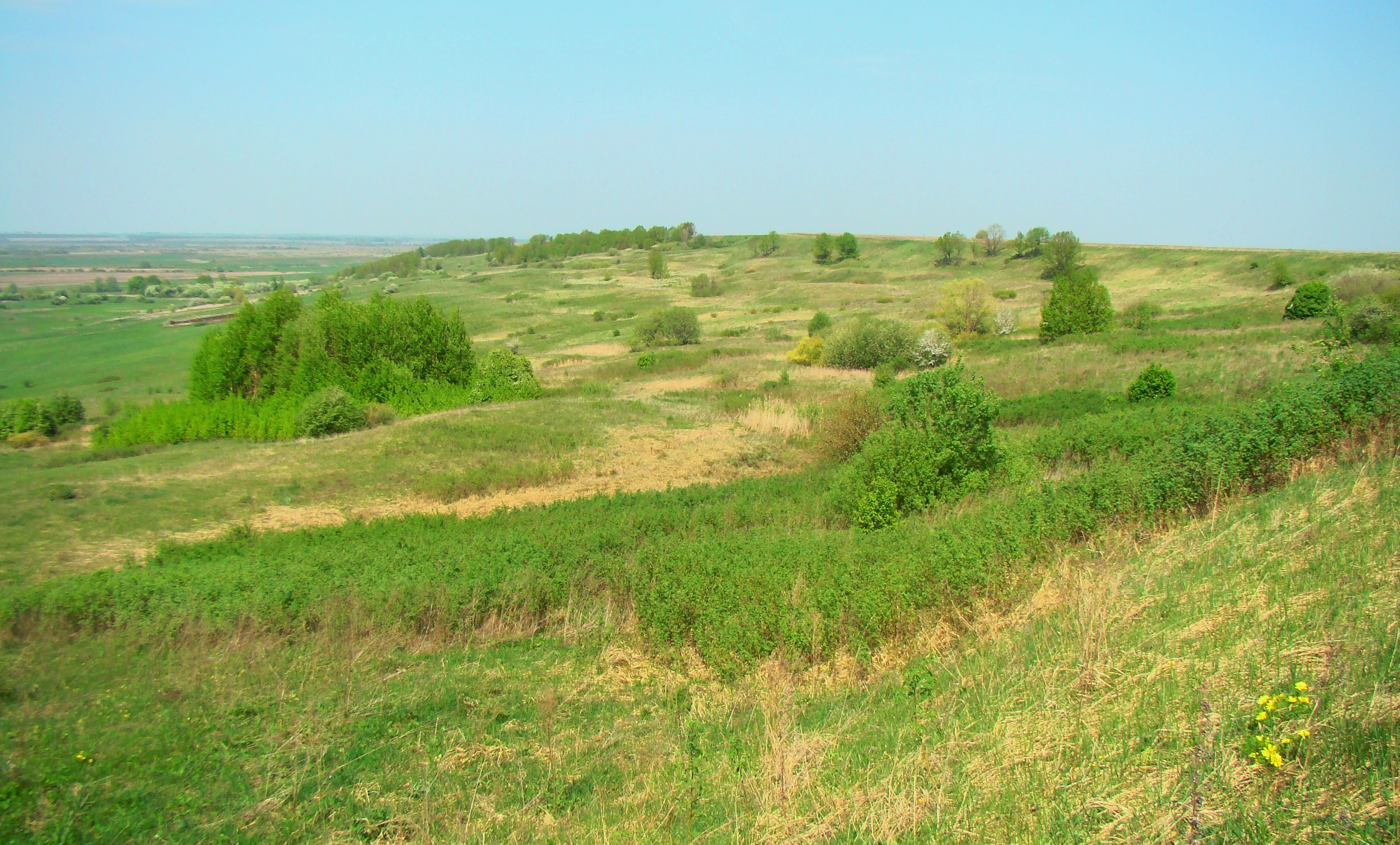
- Steppe landscape in Pochinkovsky District

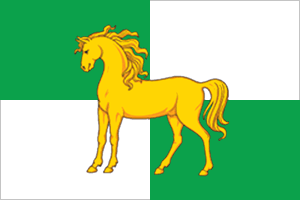
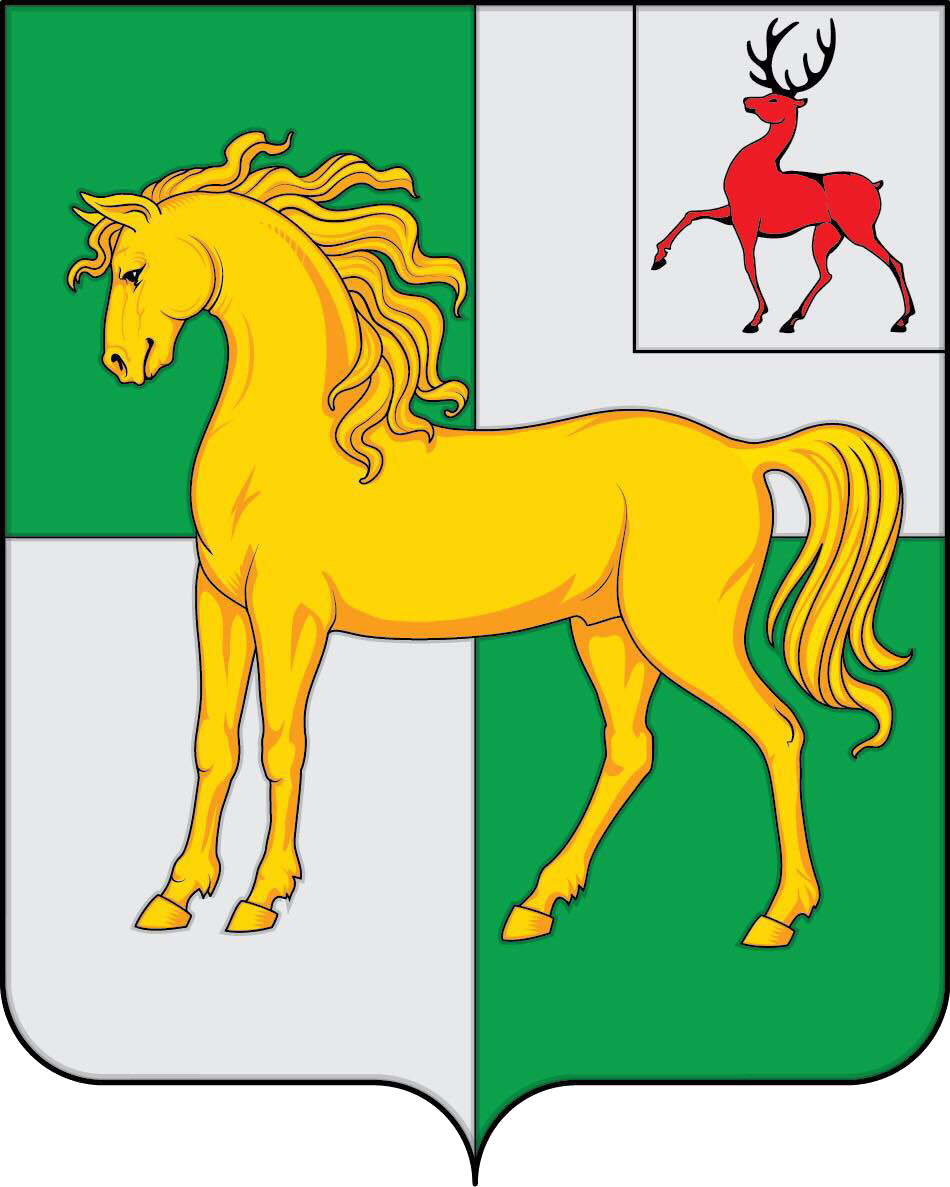
- Flag Coat of arms
- Location of Pochinkovsky District in Nizhny Novgorod Oblast
- Coordinates: 54°42′19″N 44°51′53″E
- Country: Russia
- Federal subject: Nizhny Novgorod Oblast
- Established: 1929
- Administrative center: Pochinki

Area
  - Total: 1,960.6 km^{2} (757.0 sq mi)

Population (2010 Census)
  - Total: 30,668
  - Density: 15.642/km^{2} (40.513/sq mi)
  - Urban: 0%
  - Rural: 100%

Administrative structure
  - Administrative divisions: 9 Selsoviets
  - Inhabited localities: 78 rural localities

Municipal structure
  - Municipally incorporated as: Pochinkovsky Municipal District
  - Municipal divisions: 0 urban settlements, 9 rural settlements
- Time zone: UTC+3 (MSK)
- OKTMO ID: 22646000
- Website: http://pochinki.org

Pochinkovsky District (Russian: Почи́нковский райо́н) is an administrative district (raion), one of the forty in Nizhny Novgorod Oblast, Russia. Municipally, it is incorporated as Pochinkovsky Municipal District. It is located in the southeast of the oblast. The area of the district is 1,960.6 square kilometers (757.0 sq mi). Its administrative center is the rural locality (a selo) of Pochinki. Population: 30,668 (2010 Census); 33,788 (2002 census); 38,192 (1989 Soviet census). The population of Pochinki accounts for 38.8% of the district's total population.

== History ==
The district was established in 1929.
