= Gamsutl =

Gamsutl Гамсутль Гъамсукь
- village
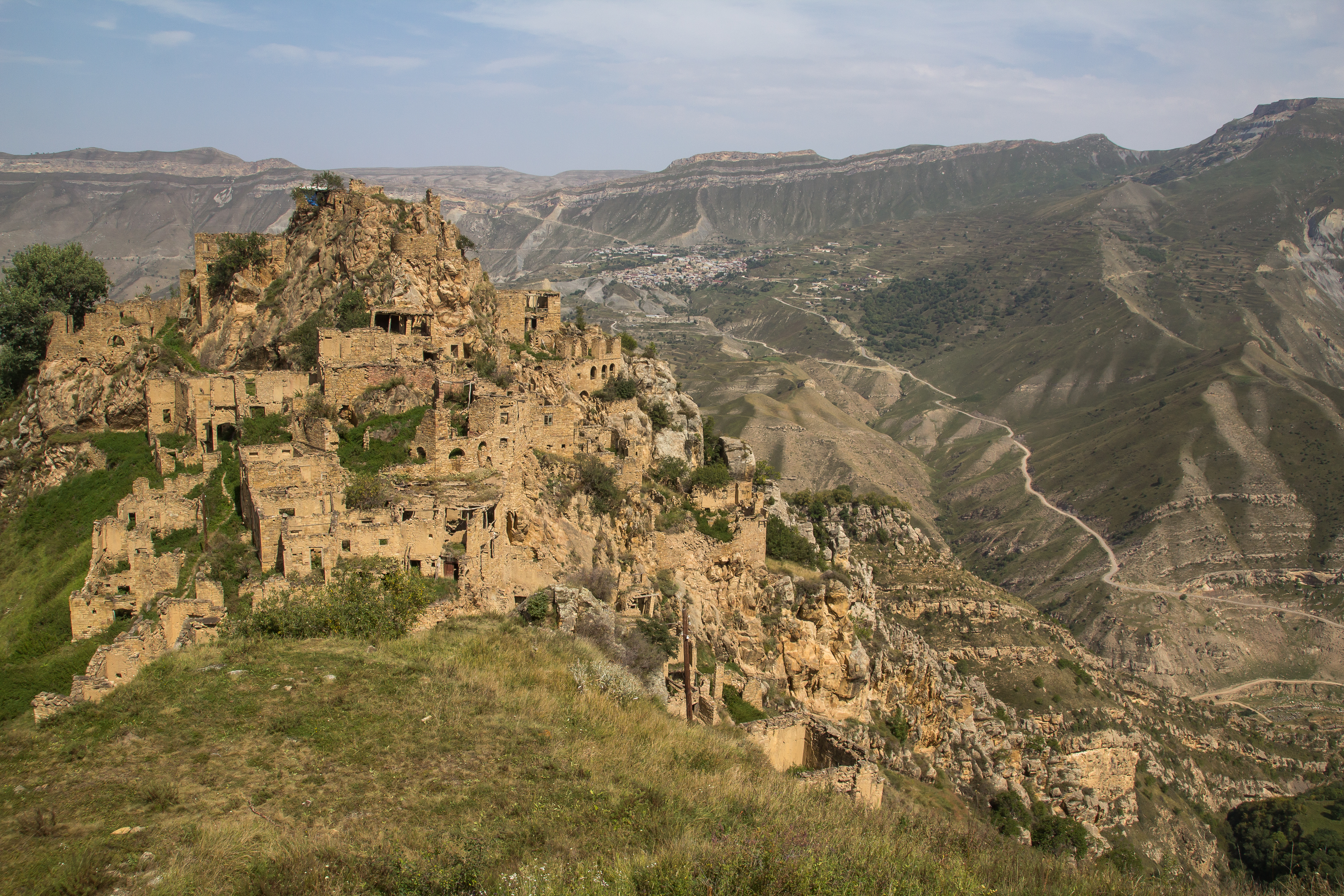
- Abandoned Gamsutl in 2018

- Location of Gamsutl in Dagestan Location of Gamsutl in Russia Location of Gamsutl in Europe
- Coordinates: 42°18′10″N 46°59′47″E
- Elevation: 1,400 m (4,600 ft)

Population
  - Total: 0

Gamsutl (Russian: Гамсутль, romanized: Gamsutl'; Avar: Гъамсукь, romanized: Ghamsutlʼ) is a ghost town in the Gunibsky District of Dagestan, Russia, that lies on Mount Gamsutlmeer at an altitude of roughly 1,400 meters above sea level.

== History ==
'Gamsutl' in Avar language means "at the foot of the khan's fortress".

The exact age of the village is unknown, but it is considered to be one of the oldest settlements in Dagestan, being 2,000 to 5,000 years old. In its peak, the village consisted of 300 homes with up to 3,000 inhabitants. In the 20th century the village had shops, a post office, and a hospital. In the late 1950s people began to leave the village; the number of inhabitants fell to 200 in 1970 and to 17 in 2002. In 2015, the village's last resident, Abdulzhalil Abdulzhalilov, died. He called himself mayor and became quite famous after a series of television reports. Now Gamsutl is uninhabited and visited only by tourists.
