= Pochinki, Pochinkovsky District, Nizhny Novgorod Oblast =

Rural locality in Pochinkovsky District, Nizhny Novgorod Oblast, Russia

Coordinates: 54°42′15″N 44°52′0″E

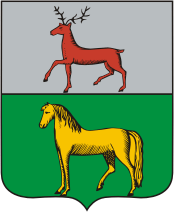
Coat of arms of Pochinki

Pochinki (Russian: Почи́нки) is a rural locality (a selo) and the administrative center of Pochinkovsky District of Nizhny Novgorod Oblast, Russia. Population: 11,891 (2010 census); 11,925 (2002 census); 11,148 (1989 Soviet census).
