= Head of the Republic of Dagestan =

Highest-ranking official in Dagestan, Russia

- Глава Республики Дагестан (Russian)
- Standard of the Head of the Republic Dagestan

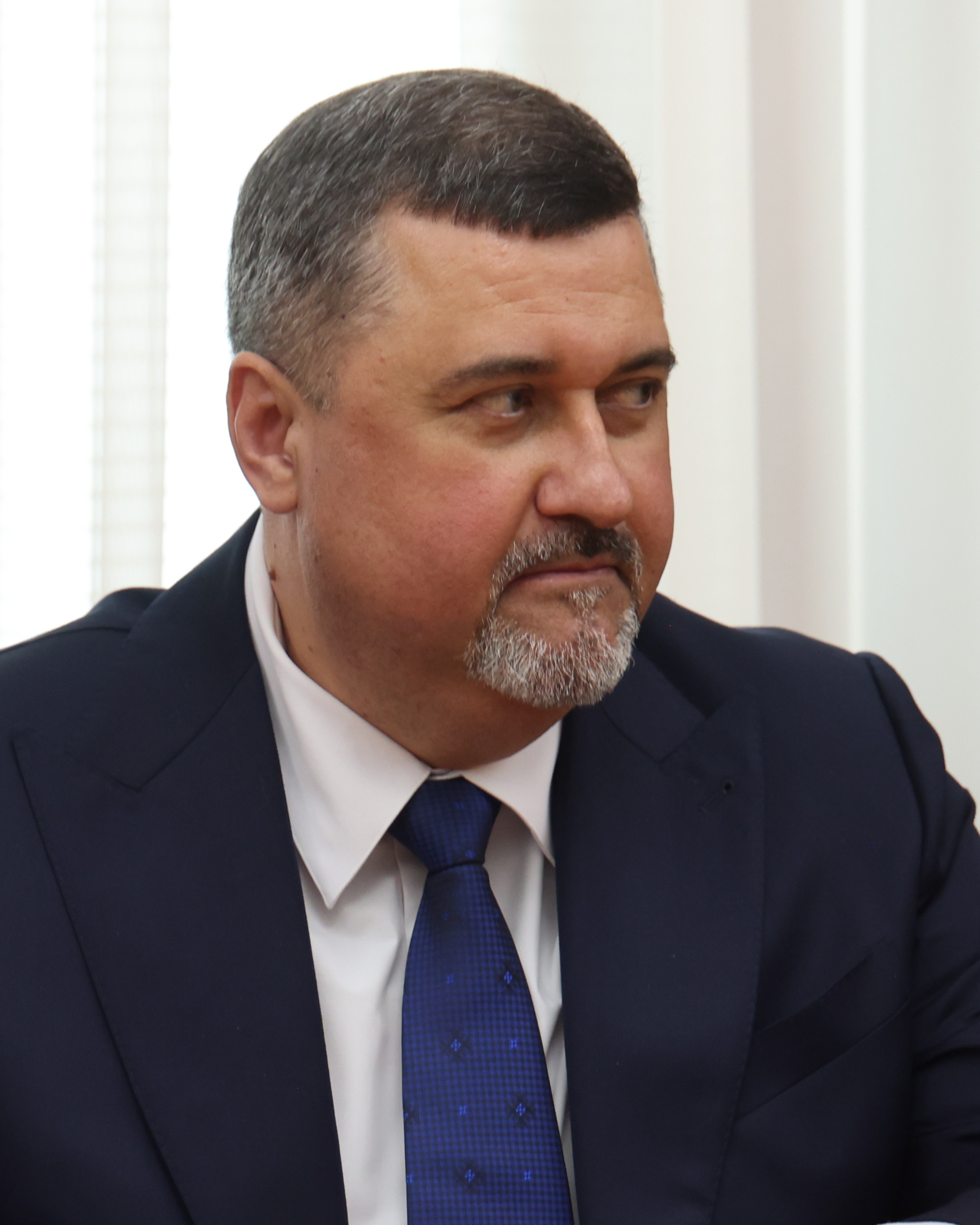
- Incumbent; Fyodor Shchukin; Acting since 4 May 2026
- Executive office of the President
- Style: His Excellency, The Honorable, Mr. President
- Residence: White House in Makhachkala
- Nominator: President of Russia
- Appointer: People's Assembly
- Term length: Five years, no more than two consecutive terms
- Formation: 2006
- First holder: Mukhu Aliyev
- Salary: $ 15,000 (2018)
- Website: president.e-dag.ru

The Head of the Republic of Dagestan is the highest official and the head of the executive power of the Republic of Dagestan. The Head is Dagestan’s Head of State and Head of Government.

The Head of Dagestan’s duty is to ensure compliance with the Russian Constitution and federal laws and the Constitution and laws of the Republic of Dagestan, as well as the equality of nations and the rights and freedoms of man and citizen, and the preservation of the unity and territorial integrity of the Republic of Dagestan. The Head of the Republic can not be a person aged under 30.

The term of office is four years. The position is appointed by the People's Assembly of the Republic of Dagestan.

Since 4 May 2026, Fyodor Shchukin has been the acting Head of the Republic of Dagestan.

== History of office ==
Since 1994, the State Council of the Republic of Dagestan was the highest executive body in the region, which was elected by the Constitutional Assembly and which included representatives of 14 "main" Dagestani ethnic groups. Magomedali Magomedov was elected chairman of the State Council three times, in 1994, 1998 and 2002.

In 2003, a new Constitution of Dagestan was adopted, in which the post of President was introduced. The first direct presidential elections were to take place in 2006, after the end of Magomedov's third term. At the same time the State Council of Dagestan should have been disestablished. However, in December 2004, at the initiative of the President of Russia Vladimir Putin, the elections of regional leaders were replaced with appointment by the legislative bodies on the proposal of the President of Russia.

In July 2011, the People's Assembly of Dagestan supported amendments to the constitution, changing the title of the highest office from President to Head of the Republic. The law came into force on January 1, 2014.

In May 2012, at the initiative of outgoing Russian president Dmitry Medvedev, a federal law was adopted returning the direct elections of heads of regions, which came into force on June 1. In June 2012, the People's Assembly of Dagestan adopted a law “On elections of the President of Dagestan”, according to which the president is elected by direct popular vote, but self-nominated candidates cannot take part in elections, and party candidates must overcome a 10% municipal threshold.

On 23 January 2013, the early resignation of the President Magomedsalam Magomedov took place. Five days later Vladimir Putin appointed Ramazan Abdulatipov as acting president of Dagestan, who was previously speaker of Russia's upper house of parliament in early 90s.

On April 1, Abdulatipov said that Dagestan may cancel direct presidential elections. In his opinion, the election will most likely held within the parliament. At the same time, Abdulatipov stated that he himself supports holding direct elections and is ready to run. On April 18, the People's Assembly in favor of indirect elections. Thus, Dagestan became the first Russian region to cancel direct election of its leader. Then the deputies of the People's Assembly decided that to vote on candidates for the presidency, they will gather at an extraordinary session on the regional election day (September 8). Abdulatipov was supported by 86 from 88 members of the Assembly.

On 3 October 2017, Russian president Vladimir Putin appointed Vladimir Vasilyev as the interim head of the Republic of Dagestan. On 9 September 2018 Vasilyev was elected as the head of Dagestan by the People's Assembly. Vasilyev had launched a wide anti-corruption campaign in the region. From 28 May 2018 until his retirement, he was the oldest from the federal subjects' leaders.

In October 2020 Vasilyev was replaced with Sergey Melikov, former Presidential Envoy in North Caucasus.

== List ==
=== Chairman ===
No.	Portrait	Name (Born-Died)	Term			Political Party
No.	Portrait	Name (Born-Died)	Took office	Left office	Time in office	Political Party
Chairman of the Supreme Council
1	Magomedali Magomedov	Magomedali Magomedov (1930–2022)	24 April 1990	26 July 1994	4 years, 93 days	Independent
Chairman of the State Council
(1)	Magomedali Magomedov	Magomedali Magomedov (1930–2022)	26 July 1994	20 February 2006	11 years, 209 days	Independent

=== President ===
No.	Portrait	Name (Born-Died)	Term			Political Party
No.	Portrait	Name (Born-Died)	Took office	Left office	Time in office	Political Party
1	Mukhu Aliyev	Mukhu Aliyev (born 1940)	20 February 2006	20 February 2010	4 years, 0 days	Independent
2	Magomedsalam Magomedov	Magomedsalam Magomedov (born 1964)	20 February 2010	28 January 2013	2 years, 343 days	United Russia
–	Ramazan Abdulatipov	Ramazan Abdulatipov (born 1946); Acting	28 January 2013	8 September 2013	223 days	United Russia
3	Ramazan Abdulatipov	Ramazan Abdulatipov (born 1946)	8 September 2013	1 January 2014	115 days	United Russia

=== Head ===
No.	Portrait	Name (Born-Died)	Term			Political Party
No.	Portrait	Name (Born-Died)	Took office	Left office	Time in office	Political Party
(3)	Ramazan Abdulatipov	Ramazan Abdulatipov (born 1946)	1 January 2014	3 October 2017	3 years, 275 days	United Russia
–	Vladimir Vasilyev	Vladimir Vasilyev (born 1949); Acting	3 October 2017	9 September 2018	341 days	United Russia
4	Vladimir Vasilyev	Vladimir Vasilyev (born 1949)	9 September 2018	5 October 2020	2 years, 26 days	United Russia
–	Sergey Melikov	Sergey Melikov (born 1965); Acting	5 October 2020	14 October 2021	1 year, 9 days	Independent
5	Sergey Melikov	Sergey Melikov (born 1965)	14 October 2021	4 May 2026	4 years, 202 days	United Russia
–	Fyodor Shchukin	Fyodor Shchukin (born 1976); Acting	4 May 2026	Incumbent	141 days	Independent

== Sources ==
- Russian Administrative divisions
