= Magomedali Magomedov =

Russian politician (1930–2022)

- Магомедали Магомедов; МяхӀяммадла МяхӀяммадгӀяли
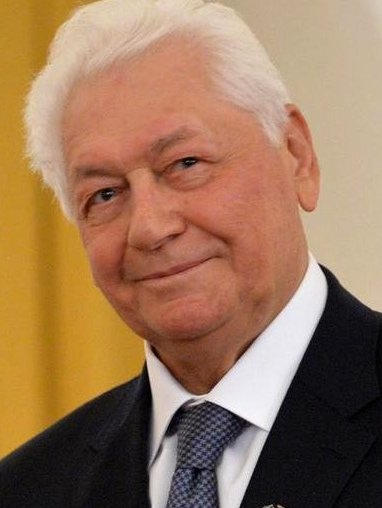
- Magomedov in 2016

Chairman of the State Council of Dagestan
- In office 26 July 1994 – 20 February 2006
- Preceded by: Position established
- Succeeded by: Position abolished Mukhu Aliyev (as president)

Chairman of the Supreme Soviet of Dagestan
- In office 24 April 1990 – 26 July 1994

Chairman of the Council of Ministers of Dagestan ASSR
- In office 24 May 1983 – August 1987

Personal details
- Born: 15 June 1930 Levashi, Dagestan ASSR, Russian SFSR, USSR
- Died: 4 December 2022 (aged 92) Makhachkala, Dagestan, Russia
- Party: Communist Party of the Soviet Union (1970–1991)
- Spouse: Zulgizhat Magomedova
- Children: 6

Magomedali Magomedovich Magomedov (Russian: Магомедали Магомедович Магомедов; Dargwa: МяхӀяммадла урши МяхӀяммадгӀяли; 15 June 1930 – 4 December 2022) was a Russian politician who served as the Head of the State Council of Dagestan from 1992 to 2006.

== Biography ==
Magomedov was born on 15 June 1930, in Levashi, Levashinsky district, Republic of Dagestan.

Magomedov graduated from the Dagestan Teachers Institute in 1952, and in 1968 from the Dagestan Institute of Agriculture. In 1969 he was elected chairman of the Levashinsky District executive committee. In December next year he switched to the work within the Communist Party and became the first secretary of the Levashinsky district committee. In September 1975, he was appointed head of the agricultural department of the Dagestan Regional Committee of the Party. In January 1979, he began working in the Government of Dagestan, first as deputy chairman of the Council of Ministers, and since May 1983 as Chairman of the Council of Ministers.

In 1987 Magomedov achieved the office of the Chairman of the Presidium of the Supreme Soviet of Dagestan ASSR, which was mostly ceremonial post at the time, ranked as head of state in Dagestan. On 24 April 1990, he was elected Chairman of the Supreme Council of the Dagestan ASSR. Magomedov was one of the few leaders to keep his post in the post-Soviet Russian Federation.

On 26 July 1994, he was elected Chairman of the State Council of the Republic of Dagestan. The State Council acted as a collective head of state in Dagestan, composed from 14 representatives of the region's major ethnic groups. On 26 June 1998, Magomedov was re-elected to the same post, and on 25 June 2002, again for the third time. He resigned on 19 February 2006, for unclear reasons, and was replaced two days later by Mukhu Aliyev, and the State Council was dissolved on 20 February. Unlike Magomedov, Aliyev was styled as president of Dagestan, according to 2003 Constitution.

== Personal life and death ==
Magomedov was married and had six children. He was also the father of Magomedsalam Magomedov, who served as president of Dagestan from 2010 to 2013.

Magomedov died on 4 December 2022, at the age of 92.

== Honours and awards ==
- Order "For Merit to the Fatherland";
  - 1st class (15 June 2005) – for outstanding contribution to strengthening Russian statehood, friendship and cooperation between nations
  - 3rd class (24 April 2000) – for outstanding contribution to strengthening Russian statehood, friendship and cooperation between nations
- Order of Honour (27 June 1995) – for his great personal contribution to strengthening and development of Russian statehood, friendship and cooperation between peoples
- Order of the October Revolution
- Order of the Red Banner of Labour, twice
- Order of the Badge of Honour
- Order of Friendship of Peoples
- Diploma of the Russian Federation Government (14 June 2000) – for his great personal contribution to the socio-economic development of the Republic of Dagestan, a long and conscientious work in connection with the 70th anniversary of the birth
- Dostlug Order

== Major achievements ==
Magomedali Magomedov's major achievement was balanced politics that helped to keep Dagestan away from major social and religious conflicts. He managed to smooth all conflicting positions and reach compromise for different ethnic groups in Dagestan. He was also famous for modernization initiatives. The major criticism of Magomedali was related to ongoing corruption in his office.
