= Dagestan State University =

Public university in Makhachkala, Dagestan, Russia

- Type: Public
- Established: 1931
- Rector: Murtazali Rabadanov
- Students: 17,942
- Location: 43a Gadzhiyeva Street, Makhachkala, Dagestan, Russia; 42.9861°N 47.4939°E Building details
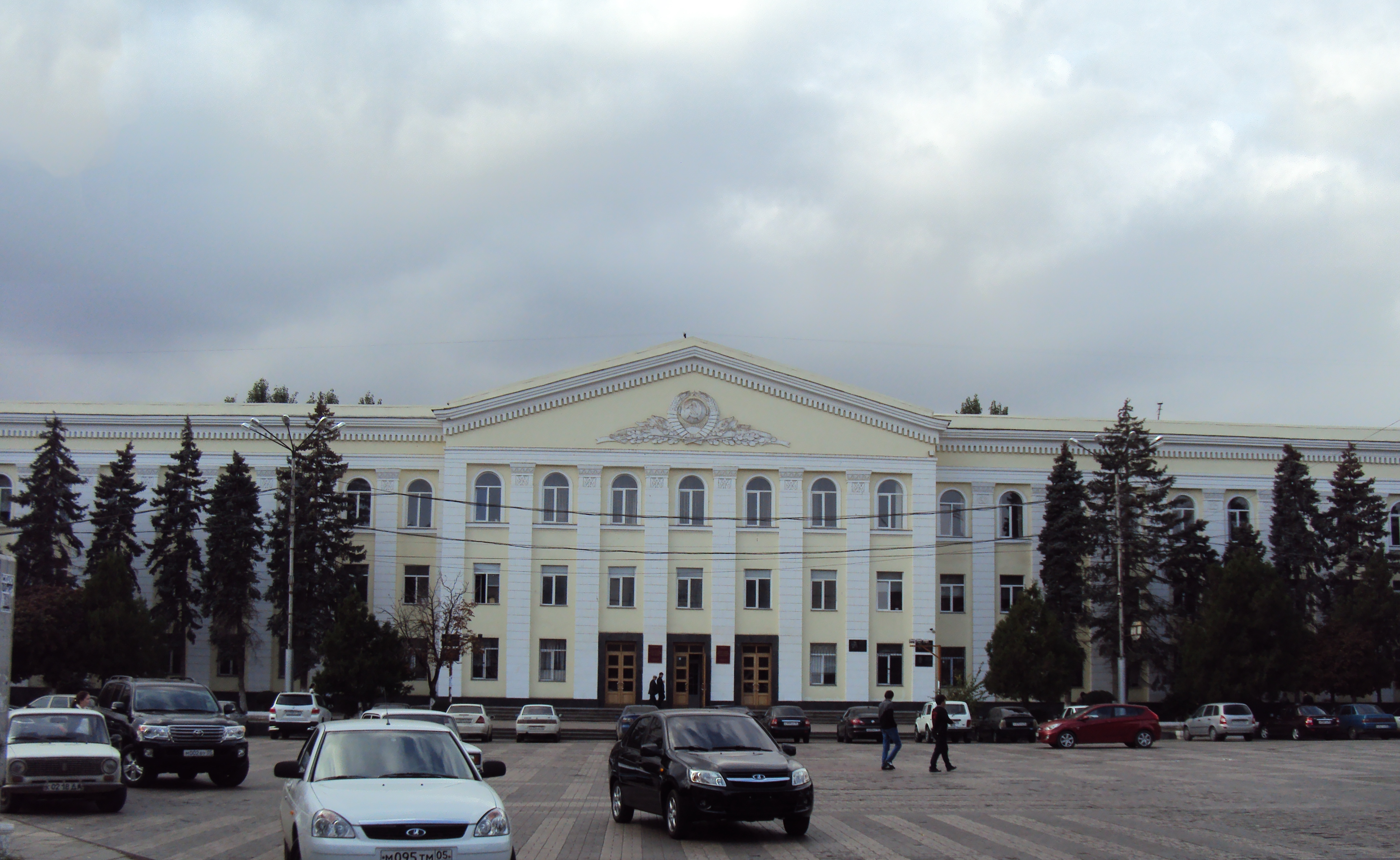
- Website: dgu.ru

Dagestan State University (Russian: Дагестанский государственный университет, romanized: Dagestanskiy gosudarstvennyy universitet) is a public university in Makhachkala, Republic of Dagestan which is a federal subject in the Russian Federation. It is one of the largest higher educational institutions in Dagestan and a major scientific and cultural center. It was founded in 1931 as the Teachers' Training Institute, and later, in 1957 it was transformed into Dagestan State University (DSU) named after the national poet of Dagestan Suleyman Stalsky. The university includes 16 scientific and educational centers, 17 faculties, 97 departments, 4 branches, 2 museums (biological and historical), a fundamental library, a biological station and a planetarium. The university employs about 3,000 teachers and staff.

== History ==
On 8 October 1931 the Council of People's Commissars of the Dagestan Autonomous Soviet Socialist Republic adopted a resolution “On the Opening of the Dagestan Agro-Pedagogical Institute”. The grand opening of the institute was timed to coincide with the 14th anniversary of the October Revolution. In November 1931, classes began at the Pedagogical Institute. 75 students were accepted to the first year of the institute and were trained by 10 full-time teachers. Despite the difficult material conditions, lack of training facilities, and insufficient dormitories, the majority of students completed the first academic year successfully. Students passed their exams and went to the districts of the republic with a specific task to conduct active work in the villages on the new recruitment to the institute. In 1935 the first graduation took place. Dagestan received 39 teachers with higher education. Back then 260 students studied at the university. In 1954, the institute received a new building with an area of over 6 thousand m^{2} containing assembly/sports halls and classrooms, while the old academic building was converted into a dormitory.
