= People's Assembly of the Republic of Dagestan =

Regional parliament of Dagestan, Russia

People's Assembly of the Republic of Dagestan Народное собрание Республики Дагестан
- 7th legislature

Type
- Type: Unicameral

Leadership
- Chairman: Zaur Askenderov, United Russia since 30 September 2021

Structure
- Seats: 90
- Political groups: United Russia (69); SRZP (11); CPRF (10)

Elections
- Voting system: Proportional
- Last election: 19 September 2021
- Next election: 2026

Meeting place
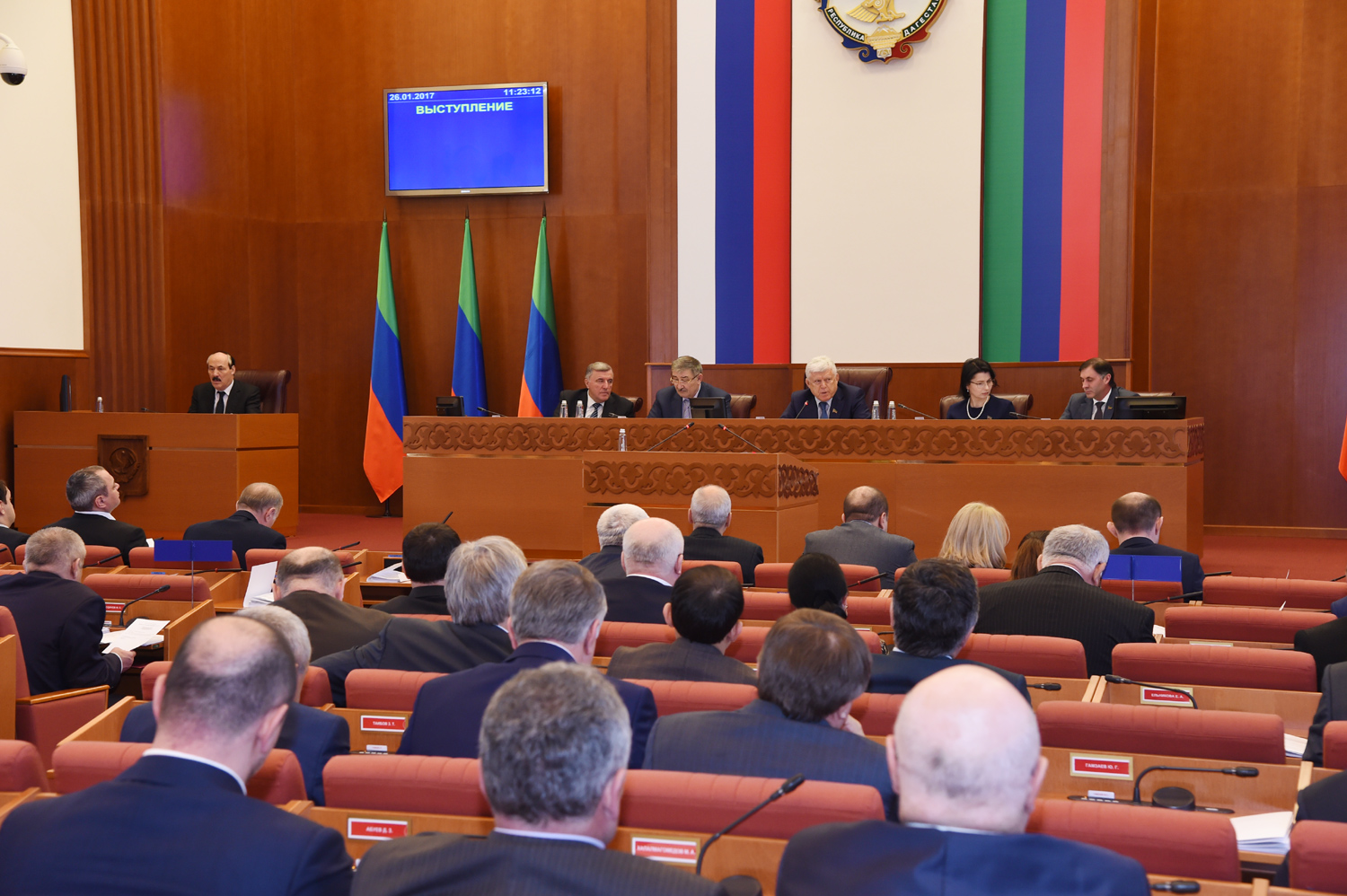
- House of the Government, Gamzatova Street, Makhachkala

Website
- www.nsrd.ru

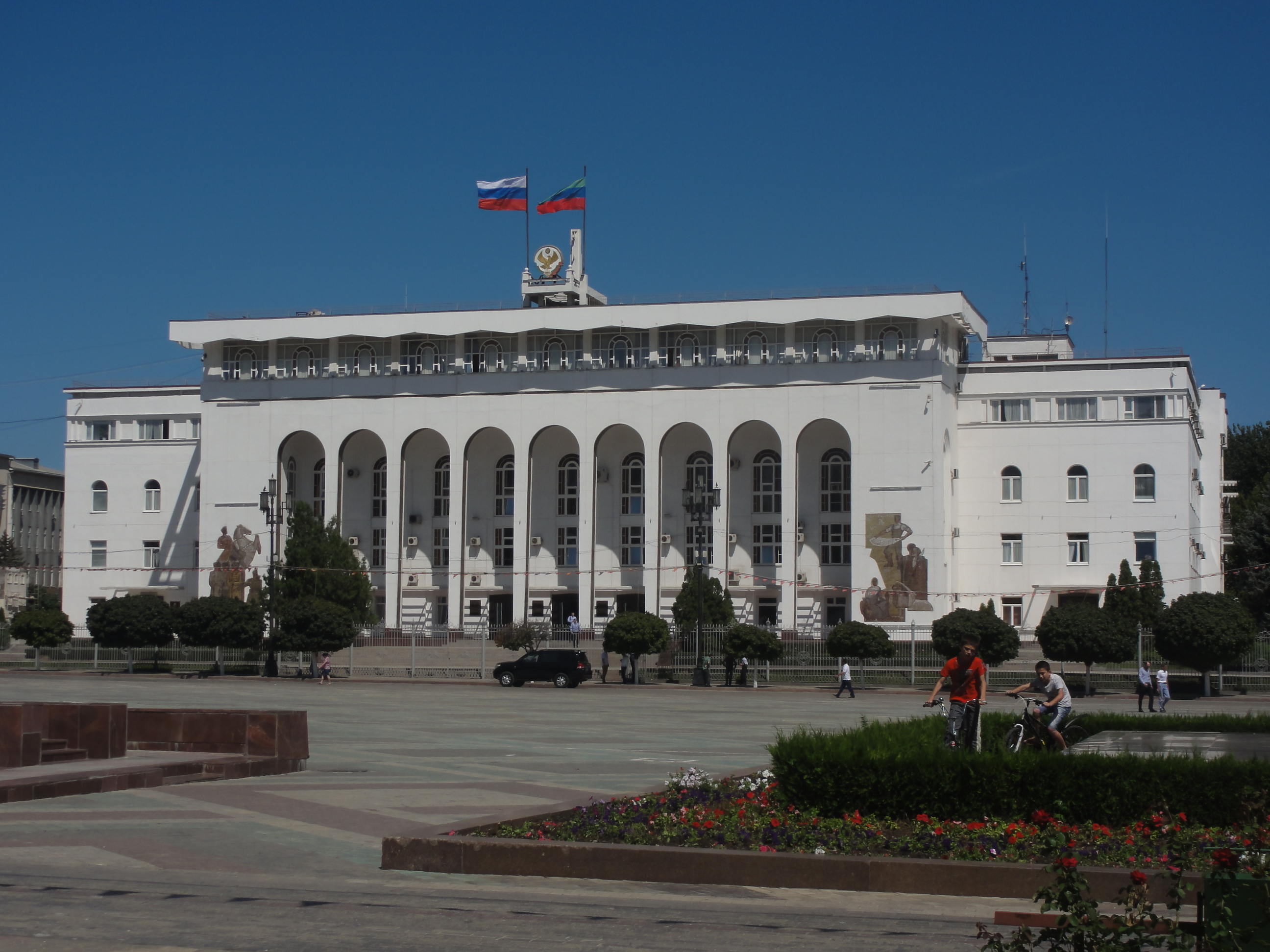
Parliament building in Makhachkala

The People's Assembly of the Republic of Dagestan (Note: Russian: Народное собрание Республики Дагестан, romanized: Narodnoye sobraniye Respubliki Dagestan, Avar: Дагъистан Республикаялъул Халкъияб Данделъи, romanized: Dağistan Respublikayaļul Xalqiyab Dandeļi, Azerbaijani: Дағыстан Республикасынын Халг Мәҹлиси, romanized: Dağıstan Respublikasının Xalq Məclisi, Kumyk: Дагъыстан Республиканы Халкъ Жыйыны, romanized: Dağıstan Respublikanı Xalq Jıyını, Lezgian: Дагъустан Республикадин Халкьдин Собрание, romanized: Dağustan Respublikadin Xalqdin Sobraniye, Nogai: Дагыстан Республикасынынъ Халк Йыйыны, romanized: Dağıstan Respublikanıñ Xalq Yıyını) is the regional parliament of Dagestan, a federal subject of Russia. Its seat is in Makhachkala.

The parliament comprises 90 deputies. They are elected for five years by secret ballot and universal suffrage. The Chairman of the Council of Ministers is appointed by the State Council with the consent of the People's Assembly. Of that reason, the government of Dagestan is responsible and accountable to both the State Council and the People's Assembly.

== Elections ==
=== 2016 ===
Party	%	Seats
United Russia	75.51	72
A Just Russia	10.45	10
Communist Party of the Russian Federation	9.14	8
Registered voters/turnout	88.13	

=== 2021 ===
Party	%	Seats
United Russia	73.74	69
A Just Russia — For Truth	12.71	11
Communist Party of the Russian Federation	11.62	10
Liberal Democratic Party of Russia	0.65	0
Party of Growth	0.58	0
Registered voters/turnout	84.35	

== See also ==
- List of chairmen of the People's Assembly of the Republic of Dagestan
