= List of rural localities in Dagestan =

Map of Russia with Dagestan highlighted

This is a list of rural localities in Dagestan. Dagestan (Russian: Дагеста́н), officially the Republic of Dagestan (Russian: Респу́блика Дагеста́н), is a federal subject (a republic) of Russia, located in the North Caucasus region. Its capital and largest city is Makhachkala, centrally located on the Caspian Sea coast. Dagestan has a population of 2,910,249.

== Agulsky District ==
Rural localities in Agulsky District:

- Amukh
- Arsug
- Bedyuk
- Burkikhan
- Burshag
- Chirag
- Duldug
- Fite
- Goa
- Khudig
- Khutkhul
- Kurag
- Richa
- Shari
- Tpig
- Tsirkhe
- Yarkug

== Akhtynsky District ==
Rural localities in Akhtynsky District:

- Akhty
- Dzhaba
- Fiy
- Gdym
- Gdynk
- Kaka
- Kaluk
- Khkem
- Khnov
- Khryug
- Lutkun
- Midzhakh
- Novy Usur
- Ukhul
- Yalak
- Zrykh

== Akhvakhsky District ==
Rural localities in Akhvakhsky District:

- Anchik
- Archo
- Ingerdakh
- Izano
- Karata
- Kudiyabroso
- Lologonitel
- Mashtada
- Mesterukh
- Rachabulda
- Ratsitl
- Tad-Magitl
- Tlibisho
- Tlisi
- Tsoloda
- Tukita
- Verkhneye Inkhelo

== Akushinsky District ==
Rural localities in Akushinsky District:

- Akhsakadamakhi
- Akusha
- Alikhanmakhi
- Ameterkmakhi
- Aynikabmakhi
- Balkhar
- Bikalamakhi
- Bukkamakhi
- Burgimakmakhi
- Butri
- Chankalamakhi
- Chinimakhi
- Dubrimakhi
- Gapshima
- Geba
- Gerkhmakhi
- Ginta
- Giyagaramakhi
- Gulebki
- Gumramakhi
- Gunnamakhi
- Inzimakhi
- Kaddamakhi
- Kakmakhi
- Kamkadamakhi
- Karsha
- Kassagumakhi
- Kavkamakhi
- Kertukmakhi
- Khazhnimakhi
- Kubrimakhi
- Kuli
- Kuliyamakhi
- Kurimakhi
- Kurkimakhi
- Mugi
- Murlatinamakhi
- Nakhi
- Natsi
- Nizhniye Karshli
- Nizhny Chiamakhi
- Semgamakhi
- Shinkbalakada
- Shukty
- Tanty
- Tebekmakhi
- Tserkhimakhi
- Tsugni
- Tsulikana
- Tsundimakhi
- Tsunimakhi
- Tuzlamakhi
- Ulluchara
- Urgani
- Urgubamakhi
- Urkhuchimakhi
- Urzhagimakhi
- Usisha
- Utsilimakhi
- Uznimakhi
- Verkhniye Mulebki
- Verkhny Chiamakhi
- Yaraymakhi
- Zilmukmakhi

== Babayurtovsky District ==
Rural localities in Babayurtovsky District:

- Adil-Yangiyurt
- Alimpashayurt
- Babayurt
- Chankayurt
- Gemetyube
- Germenchik
- Khamamatyurt
- Khasanay
- Lyuksemburg
- Muzhukay
- Novaya Kosa
- Novokare
- Sovetskoye
- Tamazatyube
- Tamazatyube Staroye
- Tatayurt
- Turshunay
- Utsmiyurt
- Yangylbay

== Botlikhsky District ==
Rural localities in Botlikhsky District:

- Alak
- Andi
- Ankho
- Ansalta
- Ashali
- Ashino
- Beledi
- Botlikh
- Godoberi
- Gunkha
- Khando
- Kheleturi
- Kizhani
- Miarso
- Muni
- Nizhneye Inkhelo
- Rakhata
- Rushukha
- Shivor
- Shodroda
- Tando
- Tasuta
- Tlokh
- Zibirkhali
- Zilo

== Buynaksky District ==
Rural localities in Buynaksky District:

- Agachkala
- Akaytala
- Apshi
- Arkas
- Atlanaul
- Buglen
- Chabanmakhi
- Chankurbe
- Chirkey
- Durangi
- Ekibulak
- Erpeli
- Gergentala
- Kachkalyk
- Kadar
- Kafyr-Kumukh
- Karamakhi
- Khalimbekaul
- Manasaul
- Nizhneye Ishkarty
- Nizhneye Kazanishche
- Nizhny Dzhengutay
- Nizhny Karanay
- Takalay
- Vanashimakhi
- Verkhneye Ishkarty
- Verkhneye Kazanishche
- Verkhny Dzhengutay
- Verkhny Karanay

== Charodinsky District ==
Rural localities in Charodinsky District:

- Alchunib
- Archib
- Baginub
- Chanab
- Charoda
- Chitab
- Chunib
- Chvadab
- Doronub
- Dusrakh
- Gidib
- Gilib
- Goab
- Gochada
- Gochob
- Gontlob
- Gunukh
- Irib
- Kalib
- Karanub
- Keserib
- Khilikh
- Khinub
- Khitab
- Khurukh
- Kosroda
- Kubatl
- Kuchrab
- Kutikh
- Magar
- Mogrob
- Moshob
- Mugurukh
- Mukutl
- Murukh
- Nukush
- Ritlyab
- Ruldab
- Sachada
- Shalib
- Sumeta
- Talukh
- Tlyarosh
- Tsadakh
- Tsemer
- Tseneb
- Tsulda
- Tsurib
- Urukh-Sota
- Utlukh

== Dakhadayevsky District ==
Rural localities in Dakhadayevsky District:

- Ashty
- Ayatsimakhi
- Ayatsuri
- Bakni
- Buskri
- Butulta
- Chishili
- Dibgalik
- Dibgashi
- Duakar
- Dzhurmachi
- Dzilebki
- Guladty
- Gunakari
- Iragi
- Iraki
- Itsari
- Kalkni
- Karkatsi
- Kharbuk
- Khuduts
- Khurshni
- Kishcha
- Kudagu
- Kunki
- Meusisha
- Morskoye
- Mukrakari
- Novy Urkarakh
- Shadni
- Shalasi
- Shari
- Sumiya
- Sutbuk
- Trisanchi
- Tsizgari
- Tsurai
- Uragi
- Urari
- Urkarakh
- Urkhnishcha
- Urtsaki
- Zilbachi
- Zubanchi

== Derbentsky District ==
Rural localities in Derbentsky District:

- Aglobi
- Andreyevka
- Arablinskoye
- Belidzhi
- Berikey
- Bilgadi
- Chinar
- Delichoban
- Dzhalgan
- Dzhemikent
- Gedzhukh
- Kala
- Karadagly
- Karadagly
- Kullar
- Mitagi
- Mitagi-Kazmalyar
- Mugarty
- Muzaim
- Nizhny Dzhalgan
- Nyugdi
- Padar
- Rubas
- Rukel
- Sabnova
- Salik
- Tatlyar
- Ullu-Terkeme
- Vavilovo
- Velikent
- Yuny Pakhar
- Zidyan-Kazmalyar

== Dokuzparinsky District ==
Rural localities in Dokuzparinsky District:

- Avadan
- Demirar
- Esetar
- Gandurar
- Kaladzhukh
- Karakyure
- Kavalar
- Kerimkhanar
- Kiler
- Mikrakh
- Miskindzha
- Novoye Karakyure
- Tekipirkent
- Usukhchay

== Gergebilsky District ==
Rural localities in Gergebilsky District:

- Akushali
- Aymaki
- Chalda
- Darada
- Gergebil
- Gotsob
- Iputa
- Khvarada
- Khvartikuni
- Kikuni
- Kudutl
- Kurmi
- Maali
- Mogokh
- Murada
- Tunzi.

== Gumbetovsky District ==
Rural localities in Gumbetovsky District:

- Argvani
- Chirkata
- Chitl
- Danukh
- Gadari
- Ichichali
- Igali
- Ingishi
- Kilyatl
- Kunzakh
- Mekhelta
- Narysh
- Nizhneye Inkho
- Nizhny Aradirikh
- Novoye Argvani
- Shabdukh
- Sredny Aradirikh
- Tantari
- Tlyarata
- Tsanatl
- Tsundi
- Verkhneye Inkho
- Verkhny Aradirikh

== Gunibsky District ==
Rural localities in Gunibsky District:

- Agada
- Ala
- Amuarib
- Balanub
- Batsada
- Bolshoy Urala
- Bukhty
- Chokh
- Chonob
- Egeda
- Enseruda
- Gonoda
- Gunib
- Ivaylazda
- Karadakh
- Keger
- Khamagib
- Khatsunob
- Khindakh
- Khopor
- Khotoch
- Kommuna
- Koroda
- Kulla
- Lakhchayda
- Maly Urala
- Megeb
- Mugdab
- Nakazukh
- Nizhny Keger
- Obokh
- Obonub
- Rosutl
- Rugudzha
- Salta
- Sekh
- Shangoda
- Shulani
- Silta
- Sogratl
- Tlogob
- Tsalada
- Unkida
- Unty
- Urala

== Karabudakhkentsky District ==
Rural localities in Karabudakhkentsky District:

- Adanak
- Agachaul
- Dorgeli
- Dzhanga
- Geli
- Gubden
- Gurbuki
- Kakamakhi
- Karabudakhkent
- Leninkent
- Manaskent
- Paraul
- Siragi
- Ullubiyaul
- Zelenomorsk

== Kayakentsky District ==
Rural localities in Kayakentsky District:

- Alkhadzhakent
- Bashlykent
- Deybuk
- Druzhba
- Dzhavankent
- Gasha
- Gerga
- Inchkhe
- Kapkaykent
- Karanayaul
- Kayakent
- Kulkam
- Novokayakent
- Novye Vikri
- Pervomayskoye
- Sagasi-Deybuk
- Usemikent
- Utamysh

== Kaytagsky District ==
Rural localities in Kaytagsky District:

- Adaga
- Akhmedkent
- Barshamay
- Bazhluk
- Chakhdikna
- Chumli
- Daknisa
- Duregi
- Dzhavgat
- Dzhibakhni
- Dzhigiya
- Dzhinabi
- Dzhirabachi
- Gaziya
- Guldy
- Gulli
- Karatsan
- Kartalay
- Khadagi
- Khungiya
- Kirki
- Kirtsik
- Kulegu
- Kulidzha
- Lishcha
- Madzhalis
- Mallakent
- Mizhigli
- Novaya Barsha
- Pilyaki
- Rodnikovy
- Ruka
- Sanchi
- Shilansha
- Shilyagi
- Shuragat
- Surgiya
- Surkhachi
- Surkhavkent
- Turaga
- Varsit
- Yangikent

== Kazbekovsky District ==
Rural localities in Kazbekovsky District:

- Akhsu
- Almak
- Artlukh
- Burtunay
- Dylym
- Gertma
- Gostala
- Guni
- Ikha
- Imanaliroso
- Inchkha
- Kalininaul
- Khubar
- Leninaul

== Khasavyurtovsky District ==
Rural localities in Khasavyurtovsky District:

- Abdurashid
- Adilotar
- Adzhimazhagatyurt
- Akbulatyurt
- Aksay
- Bammatyurt
- Batashyurt
- Batayurt
- Bayram
- Bayramaul
- Boragangechuv
- Chagarotar
- Dzerzhinskoye
- Genzheaul
- Goksuv
- Kadyrotar
- Kandauraul
- Karlanyurt
- Kazmaaul
- Kemsiyurt
- Khamavyurt
- Kokrek
- Kurush
- Laklakyurt
- Mogilyovskoye
- Moksob
- Mutsalaul
- Novogagatli
- Novoselskoye
- Novosositli
- Novy Kostek
- Nuradilovo
- Oktyabrskoye
- Osmanyurt
- Pervomayskoye
- Petrakovskoye
- Pokrovskoye
- Pyatiletka
- Sadovoye
- Shagada
- Simsir
- Siukh
- Solnechnoye
- Sovetskoye
- Sulevkent
- Temiraul
- Terechnoye
- Toturbiykala
- Tshiyab Ichichali
- Tukita
- Tutlar
- Umarotar
- Umashaul

== Khivsky District ==
Rural localities in Khivsky District:

- Archug
- Asakent
- Ashaga-Arkhit
- Ashaga-Tsinit
- Ashaga-Yarak
- Chere
- Chilikar
- Chuvek
- Dardarkent
- Furdag
- Garig
- Khiv
- Khursatil
- Kondik
- Kontsil
- Kug
- Kulig
- Kushtil
- Kuvig
- Lyakhlya
- Novy Frig
- Trkal
- Tslak
- Tsnal
- Tsuduk
- Urtil
- Vertil
- Yargil
- Yukhari-Arkhit
- Yukhari-Yarak
- Zakhit
- Zaza
- Zildik

== Khunzakhsky District ==
Rural localities in Khunzakhsky District:

- Akhalchi
- Arada
- Butsra
- Gonokh
- Gortkolo
- Gozolokolo
- Khindakh
- Khini
- Khunzakh
- Mushuli
- Nakitl
- Oboda
- Ochlo
- Orkachi
- Orota
- Samilakh
- Shotoda
- Siukh
- Tsada
- Tsalkita
- Uzdalroso
- Zaib

== Kizilyurtovsky District ==
Rural localities in Kizilyurtovsky District:

- Aknada
- Chontaul
- Gelbakh
- Kirovaul
- Komsomolskoye
- Kulzeb
- Matseyevka
- Miatli
- Nechayevka
- Nizhny Chiryurt
- Novoye Gadari
- Novy Chirkey
- Shushanovka
- Stalskoye
- Zubutli-Miatli

== Kizlyarsky District ==
Rural localities in Kizlyarsky District:

- Aleksandriyskaya
- Averyanovka
- Bolshaya Areshevka
- Bolshekozyrevskoye
- Bondarevskoye
- Bryansk
- Bryansky Rybzavod
- Burumbay
- Chernyayevka
- Dagestanskoye
- Gruzinskoye
- Kardonovka
- Kerlikent
- Khutseyevka
- Kokhanovskoye
- Kollektivizator
- Kosyakino
- Krasnooktyabrskoye
- Krasnoye
- Krasny Voskhod
- Kraynovka
- Kurdyukovskoye
- Makarovskoye
- Malaya Areshevka
- Mirnoye
- Mulla-Ali
- Nekrasovka
- Novaya Serebryakovka
- Novogladovka
- Novokokhanovskoye
- Novokrestyanovskoye
- Novomonastyrskoye
- Novonadezhdovka
- Novovladimirskoye
- Novy Biryuzyak
- Novy Chechen
- Oguzer
- Oktyabrskoye
- Persidskoye
- Pervokizlyarskoye
- Pervomayskoye
- Prigorodnoye
- Rechnoye
- Rybalko
- Sangishi
- Sar-Sar
- Selo imeni Karla Marksa
- Selo imeni Kirova
- Selo imeni Shaumyana
- Selo imeni Zhdanova
- Shkolnoye
- Suyutkino
- Tsvetkovka
- Tushilovka
- Ukrainskoye
- Vperyod
- Vyshe-Talovka
- Yasnaya Polyana
- Yefimovka
- Yubileynoye
- Yuzhnoye
- Zarechnoye
- Zarya Komunny

== Kulinsky District ==
Rural localities in Kulinsky District:

- Kani
- Kaya
- Khosrekh
- Kuli
- Sukiyakh
- Sumbatl
- Tsovkra-1
- Tsovkra-2
- Tsysha
- Vachi
- Vikhli

== Kumtorkalinsky District ==
Rural localities in Kumtorkalinsky District:

- Almalo
- Ardzhidada
- Dakhadayevka
- Korkmaskala
- Temirgoye
- Uchkent

== Kurakhsky District ==
Rural localities in Kurakhsky District:

- Ashakent
- Aladash
- Arablyar
- Ashakent
- Ashar
- Bakhtsug
- Gelkhen
- Ikra
- Kabir
- Khpedzh
- Khpyuk
- Khveredzh
- Khyurekhyur
- Kochkhyur
- Kukvaz
- Kumuk
- Kurakh
- Kutul
- Kvardal
- Mollakent
- Rugun
- Shimikhyur
- Shtul
- Ukuz
- Ursun
- Usug

== Laksky District ==
Rural localities in Laksky District:

- Arussi
- Bagikla
- Burshi
- Chitur
- Chukna
- Churtakh
- Govkra
- Gushchi
- Guymi
- Inisha
- Kamakhal
- Kara
- Karasha
- Khulisma
- Khuna
- Khuri
- Khurkhi
- Khurukra
- Kuba
- Kubra
- Kukni
- Kulushats
- Kuma
- Kumukh
- Kundakh
- Kundy
- Kurkli
- Kurla
- Lakhir
- Luguvalu
- Mukar
- Sangar
- Shakhuva
- Shara
- Shovkra
- Shuni
- Tulizma
- Ubra
- Unchukatl
- Uri

== Levashinsky District ==
Rural localities in Levashinsky District:

- Akhkent
- Allate
- Amalte
- Ayalakab
- Aynikab
- Buanzimakhi
- Burtanimakhi
- Chakhimakhi
- Chuni
- Damkulakada
- Ditunshimakhi
- Dzhangamakhi
- Ebdalaya
- Elakatmakhi
- Gurgumakhi
- Inkuchimakhi
- Irgali
- Kakamakhi
- Karekadani
- Karlabko
- Khadzhalmakhi
- Khakhita
- Khasakent
- Kulemtsa
- Kulibukhna
- Kumamakhi
- Kundurkhe
- Kuppa
- Kutisha
- Levashi
- Mekegi
- Musultemakhi
- Naskent
- Nizhneye Chugli
- Nizhneye Labkomakhi
- Nizhny Arshi
- Nizhny Ubekimakhi
- Okhli
- Orada Chugli
- Purrimakhi
- Suleybakent
- Susakent
- Tagirkent
- Tarlankak
- Tarlimakhi
- Tashkapur
- Tsudakhar
- Tsukhta
- Ulluaya
- Urma
- Verkhneye Labkomakhi
- Verkhny Arshi
- Verkhny Ubekimakhi
- Zurilaudimakhi

== Magaramkentsky District ==
Rural localities in Magaramkentsky District:

- Azadogly
- Bilbil-Kazmalyar
- But-Kazmalyar
- Chakhchakh-Kazmalyar
- Dzhepel
- Filya
- Gaptsakh
- Garakh
- Gilyar
- Kabir-Kazmalyar
- Kartas-Kazmalyar
- Kchun-Kazmalyar
- Khodzha-Kazmalyar
- Khorel
- Khtun-Kazmalyar
- Kirka
- Kuysun
- Magaramkent
- Maka-Kazmalyar
- Novy Aul
- Oruzhba
- Primorsky
- Sovetskoye
- Tagirkent-Kazmalyar
- Tagirkent
- Tselyagyun
- Yarukvalar

== Nogaysky District ==
Rural localities in Nogaysky District:

- Batyr-Murza
- Boranchi
- Chervlyonnye Buruny
- Edige
- Kalininaul
- Karagas
- Karasu
- Leninaul
- Nariman
- Oratyube
- Sulutyube
- Terekli-Mekteb
- Uy-Salgan

== Novolaksky District ==
Rural localities in Novolaksky District:

- Banayurt
- Barchkhoyotar
- Chapayevo
- Charavali
- Gamiyakh
- Novochurtakh
- Novokuli
- Novolakskoye
- Novomekhelta
- Tukhchar
- Yamansu
- Zoriotar

== Rutulsky District ==
Rural localities in Rutulsky District:

- Amsar
- Arakul
- Aran
- Dzhilikhur
- Gelmets
- Ikhrek
- Kala
- Kalyal
- Khiyakh
- Khlyut
- Khnyukh
- Kiche
- Kina
- Korsh
- Kufa
- Kurdul
- Kusur
- Mikik
- Mishlesh
- Mukhakh
- Muslakh
- Myukhrek
- Nizhny Katrukh
- Ottal
- Rutul
- Syugut
- Tsakhur
- Verkhny Katrukh
- Vrush

== Sergokalinsky District ==
Rural localities in Sergokalinsky District:

- Arachanamakhi
- Ayalizimakhi
- Aymaumakhi
- Aynurbimakhi
- Bakhmakhi
- Baltamakhi
- Burdeki
- Burkhimakhi
- Chabazimakhi
- Degva
- Kadirkent
- Kanasiragi
- Khabkaymakhi
- Miglakasimakhi
- Murguk
- Myurego
- Nizhneye Makhargimakhi
- Nizhneye Mulebki
- Novoye Mugri
- Sergokala
- Tsurmakhi
- Urakhi
- Vanashimakhi

== Shamilsky District ==
Rural localities in Shamilsky District:

- Andykh
- Assab
- Genitsurib
- Genta
- Gogotl
- Golotl
- Goor
- Goor-Khindakh
- Dagbash
- Datuna
- Kakhib
- Khamakal
- Khebda
- Khindakh
- Khonokh
- Khoroda
- Khotoda
- Khuchada
- Kuanib
- Machada
- Mitliurib
- Mokoda
- Musrukh
- Nakitl
- Nizhny Batlukh
- Nizhny Kolob
- Nizhny Togokh
- Nitab
- Ratlub
- Rugelda
- Somoda
- Teletl
- Tidib
- Tlezda
- Tlyanub
- Tlyakh
- Tsekob
- Urada
- Urchukh
- Urib
- Verkhny Batlukh
- Verkhny Kolob
- Verkhny Togokh
- Zanata
- Ziurib

== Suleyman-Stalsky District ==
Rural localities in Suleyman-Stalsky District:

- 2nd otdelenie sovkhoza
- Alkadar
- Asalikent
- Ashaga-Stal
- Ashagakartas
- Butkent
- Chukhverkent
- Ekendil
- Eminkhyur
- Ichin
- Ispik
- Kachalkent
- Kakhtsug
- Karchag
- Kasumkent
- Khpyuk
- Khtun
- Kurkent
- Novaya Maka
- Nyutyug
- Orta-Stal
- Piperkent
- Ptikent
- Saidkent
- Salyan
- Sardarkent
- Saytarkent
- Shikhikent
- Tatarkhankent
- Tsmur
- Ullugatag
- Yukhari-Stal
- Yukharikartas
- Zizik
- Zukhrabkent

== Tabasaransky District ==
Rural localities in Tabasaransky District:

- Afna
- Akka
- Arak
- Arkit
- Bukhnag
- Burgankent
- Chulat
- Churdaf
- Dagni
- Darvag
- Dyubek
- Dzhugdil
- Dzhuldzhag
- Dzhuli
- Firgil
- Gasik
- Gelinbatan
- Gisik
- Gumi
- Gurik
- Gurkhun
- Guvlig
- Gyugryag
- Khalag
- Khanag
- Khanak
- Khapil
- Kharag
- Kharkhni
- Kheli
- Khuchni
- Khurik
- Khustil
- Khyuryak
- Kulif
- Kurkak
- Kuvag
- Kuzhnik
- Kyurek
- Kyuryag
- Lidzhe
- Lyakhe
- Maraga
- Nichras
- Novoye Lidzhe
- Pendzhi
- Pilig
- Rugudzh
- Rushchul
- Sertil
- Shile
- Sika
- Sikukh
- Sirtich
- Tatil
- Tinit
- Tsanak
- Tsantil
- Tsukhdyg
- Tsurtil
- Turag
- Turuf
- Uluz
- Urzig
- Ushnyug
- Vechrik
- Yagdyg
- Yekrag
- Yergyunyag
- Yersi
- Yurgulig

== Tarumovsky District ==
Rural localities in Tarumovsky District:

- Alexandro-Nevskoye
- Imunny
- Kalinovka
- Karabakhli
- Kochubey
- Koktyubey
- Kuybyshevo
- Kuznetsovskoye
- Novodmitriyevka
- Novogeorgiyevka
- Novonikolayevka
- Novoromanovka
- Plodopitomnik
- Privolny
- Rassvet
- Razdolye
- Selo imeni M. Gorkogo
- Talovka
- Tarumovka
- Vyshetalovsky
- Yurkovka

== Tlyaratinsky District ==
Rural localities in Tlyaratinsky District:

- Anada
- Antsukh
- Barnab
- Betelda
- Bezhuda
- Bochokh
- Chadakolob
- Childa
- Chododa
- Choroda
- Gagar
- Garakolob
- Gebguda
- Gendukh
- Genekolob
- Gerel
- Gindib
- Gortnob
- Gvedysh
- Ibragimotar
- Kamilukh
- Karadla
- Kardib
- Katroso
- Khadakolob
- Khadiyal
- Khamar
- Kharada
- Khidib
- Khindakh
- Khintida
- Khobokh
- Khoroda
- Khorta
- Khotlob
- Kishdatl
- Kolob
- Kosob
- Kutlab
- Landa
- Machar
- Magitl
- Mazada
- Nachada
- Nadar
- Nikar
- Niklida
- Nitilsukh
- Noyrukh
- Nukhotkolob
- Rosnob
- Rosta
- Salda
- Saniorta
- Santa
- Sikar
- Talsukh
- Tamuda
- Tilutl
- Tinchuda
- Tlobzoda
- Tlyanada
- Tlyarata
- Tokh
- Tokh-Orda
- Tokhota
- Tsimguda
- Tsumilukh
- Ukal
- Ulgeb
- Zhazhada

== Tsumadinsky District ==
Rural localities in Tsumadinsky District:

- Agvali
- Aknada
- Angida
- Batlakhatli
- Gadaychi
- Gadiri
- Gachitli
- Gakko
- Gigatl
- Gigatli-Urukh
- Gigikh
- Gimerso
- Gvinachi
- Inkhokvari
- Kedy
- Khalikh
- Khvarshi
- Kochali
- Kvanada
- Kvantlada
- Khonokh
- Khushet
- Khushtada
- Khvayni
- Metrada
- Mukharkh
- Nizhniye Gakvari
- Nizhniye Khvarshini
- Richaganikh
- Santlada
- Sanukh
- Sasitli
- Shava
- Sildi
- Tenla
- Tindi
- Tissi
- Tissi-Akhitli
- Tlenkhori
- Tsidatl
- Tsumada
- Tsumada-Urukh
- Verkhneye Gakvari
- Verkhneye Khvarshini

== Tsuntinsky District ==
Rural localities in Tsuntinsky District:

- Akdy
- Asakh
- Azilta
- Chaatli
- Chalyakh
- Elbok
- Galatli
- Geniyatl
- Genukh
- Gutatli
- Ikha
- Itsirakh
- Khalakh
- Khamaitli
- Khebatli
- Khenokh
- Khetokh
- Khibiyatl
- Khora
- Khupri
- Khutrakh
- Kidero
- Kimyatli
- Kitlyarta
- Kituri
- Makhalotli
- Mitluda
- Mokok
- Retlob
- Sagada
- Shaitli
- Shapikh
- Shauri
- Shiya
- Terutli
- Tlyatsuda
- Tsibari
- Tsitsimakh
- Tsokhok
- Tsunta
- Udok
- Vitsiyatl
- Zekhida

== Untsukulsky District ==
Rural localities in Untsukulsky District:

- Arakani
- Ashilta
- Balakhani
- Betli
- Gimry
- Inkvalita
- Irganay
- Ishtiburi
- Kakhabroso
- Kharachi
- Kolob
- Maydanskoye
- Moksokh
- Tsatanikh
- Untsukul
- Zirani

== See also ==
- Lists of rural localities in Russia
