= Dagestanskoye =

Dagestanskoye Дагестанское
- Selo
- Location within Republic of Dagestan Location within Russia
- Coordinates: 43°48′N 46°53′E
- Country: Russia
- Region: Republic of Dagestan
- District: Kizlyarsky District
- Time zone: UTC+3:00

Dagestanskoye (Russian: Дагестанское) is a rural locality (a selo) in Kardonovsky Selsoviet, Kizlyarsky District, Republic of Dagestan, Russia. The population was 354 as of 2010.

== Geography ==
It is located 4 km southeast of Kardonovka.

== Nationalities ==
Avars live there.
