= Khotoch =

Khotoch Хоточ ХӀотӀочӀиб
- Selo
- Location within Republic of Dagestan Location within Russia
- Coordinates: 42°24′N 46°57′E
- Country: Russia
- Region: Republic of Dagestan
- District: Gunibsky District
- Time zone: UTC+3:00

Khotoch (Russian: Хоточ; Avar: ХӀотӀочӀиб) is a rural locality (a selo) in Gunibsky District, Republic of Dagestan, Russia. The population was 1,172 as of 2010.

== Geography ==
Khotoch is located 6 km north of Gunib (the district's administrative centre) by road. Khindakh and Gunib are the nearest rural localities.

== Nationalities ==
Avars live there.
