= Nizhny Aradirikh =

Nizhny Aradirikh Нижний Арадирих Гъоркьа Гьарадерихъ
- Selo
- Location within Republic of Dagestan Location within Russia
- Coordinates: 42°41′N 46°34′E
- Country: Russia
- Region: Republic of Dagestan
- District: Gumbetovsky District
- Time zone: UTC+3:00

Nizhny Aradirikh (Russian: Нижний Арадирих; Avar: Гъоркьа Гьарадерихъ) is a rural locality (a selo) in Aradirikhsky Selsoviet, Gumbetovsky District, Republic of Dagestan, Russia. The population was 307 as of 2010. There are 2 streets.

== Geography ==
Nizhny Aradirikh is located 47 km southeast of Mekhelta (the district's administrative centre) by road. Sredny Aradirikh and Verkhny Aradirikh are the nearest rural localities.
