= Kolob, Republic of Dagestan =

Kolob Колоб
- Selo
- Location within Republic of Dagestan Location within Russia
- Coordinates: 42°01′N 46°31′E
- Country: Russia
- Region: Republic of Dagestan
- District: Tlyaratinsky District
- Time zone: UTC+3:00

Kolob (Russian: Колоб) is a rural locality (a selo) and the administrative center of Kolobsky Selsoviet, Tlyaratinsky District, Republic of Dagestan, Russia. Population: 366 (2010 census); 1,012 (2002 census); 644 (1989 Soviet census).

== Geography ==
Kolob is located 33 km southeast of Tlyarata (the district's administrative centre) by road. Tlyanada is the nearest rural locality.
