= Simsir, Republic of Dagestan =

Simsir Симсир Симсара
- Selo
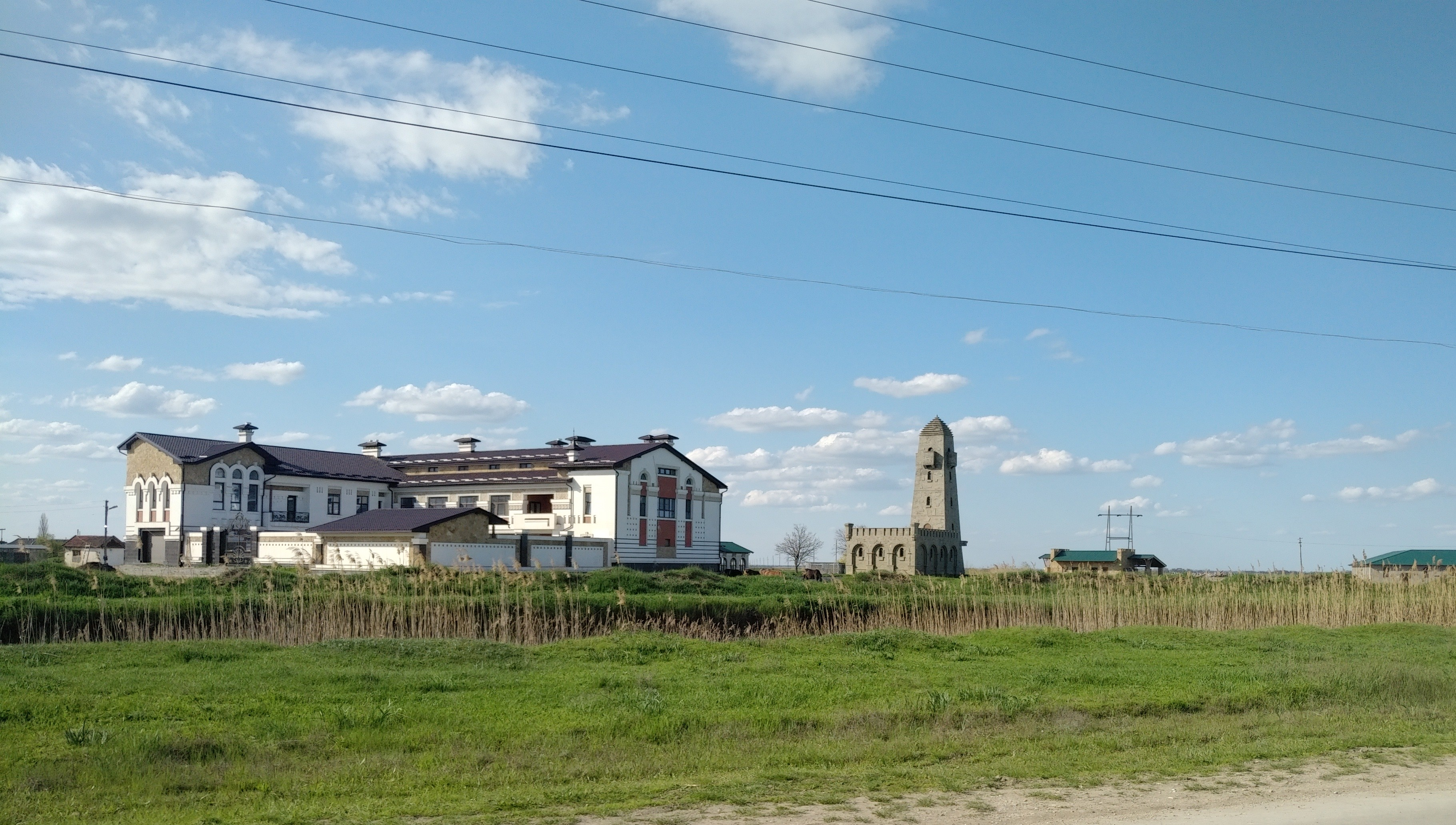
- Симсир - Хоси-Эвлан кIошт

- Location within Republic of Dagestan Location within Russia
- Coordinates: 43°18′N 46°32′E
- Country: Russia
- Region: Republic of Dagestan
- District: Khasavyurtovsky District
- Time zone: UTC+3:00

Simsir (Russian: Симсир; Chechen: Симсара, Simsara) is a rural locality (a selo) in Osmanyurtovsky Selsoviet, Khasavyurtovsky District, Republic of Dagestan, Russia. Population: 1,062 (2010 census); 822 (2002 census); 585 (1989 Soviet census). There are 10 streets.

== Geography ==
Simsir is located 9 km northwest of Khasavyurt (the district's administrative centre) by road. Osmanyurt is the nearest rural locality.
