= Rechnoye, Republic of Dagestan =

Rechnoye Речное
- Selo
- Location within Republic of Dagestan Location within Russia
- Coordinates: 43°47′N 46°43′E
- Country: Russia
- Region: Republic of Dagestan
- District: Kizlyarsky District
- Time zone: UTC+3:00

Rechnoye (Russian: Речное) is a rural locality (a selo) in Yuzhny Selsoviet, Kizlyarsky District, Republic of Dagestan, Russia. The population was 370 as of 2010. There are 7 streets. Selo was based in 1967.

== Geography ==
Rechnoye is located 3 km south of Yuzhnoye, 8 km south of Kizlyar. Yuzhnoye and Kizlyar are the nearest rural localities.

== Nationalities ==
Russians, Rutuls, Tsakhurs, Lezgins, Dargins and Avars live there.
