= Tsadakh =

Tsadakh Цадах
- Selo
- Location within Republic of Dagestan Location within Russia
- Coordinates: 43°34′N 47°02′E
- Country: Russia
- Region: Republic of Dagestan
- District: Charodinsky District
- Time zone: UTC+3:00

Tsadakh (Russian: Цадах) is a rural locality (a selo) in Charodinsky District, Republic of Dagestan, Russia. Population: 679 (2021 census); 624 (2002 census); 541 (1989 Soviet census). There are 7 streets in this selo.
