= Kurdyukovskoye =

Kurdyukovskoye Курдюковское
- Selo
- Location within Republic of Dagestan Location within Russia
- Coordinates: 43°56′N 46°57′E
- Country: Russia
- Region: Republic of Dagestan
- District: Kizlyarsky District
- Time zone: UTC+3:00

Kurdyukovskoye (Russian: Курдюковское) is a rural locality (a selo) in Chernyayevsky Selsoviet, Kizlyarsky District, Republic of Dagestan, Russia. The population was 225 as of 2010. There are 2 streets.

== Geography ==
Kurdyukovskoye is located 26 km northeast of Kizlyar (the district's administrative centre) by road. Novovladimirskoye and Burumbay are the nearest rural localities.

== Nationalities ==
Dargins, Avars, Nogais and Russians live there.
