= Sulevkent =

Sulevkent Сулевкент
- Selo
- Location within Republic of Dagestan Location within Russia
- Coordinates: 43°28′N 46°45′E
- Country: Russia
- Region: Republic of Dagestan
- District: Khasavyurtovsky District
- Time zone: UTC+3:00

Sulevkent (Russian: Сулевкент) is a rural locality (a selo) in Khasavyurtovsky District, Republic of Dagestan, Russia. Population: 2,311 (2021 census); 2,129 (2002 census); 1,691 (1989 Soviet census). There are 22 streets.

== Geography ==
Sulevkent is located 33 km northeast of Khasavyurt (the district's administrative centre) by road. Kutan Butush is the nearest rural locality.
