= Chokh, Republic of Dagestan =

Chokh Чох ЧӀохъ
- Selo
- Location within Republic of Dagestan Location within Russia
- Coordinates: 42°19′N 47°01′E
- Country: Russia
- Region: Republic of Dagestan
- District: Gunibsky District
- Time zone: UTC+3:00

Chokh (Russian: Чох; Avar: ЧӀохъ) is a rural locality (a selo) and the administrative centre of Chokhsky Selsoviet, Gunibsky District, Republic of Dagestan, Russia. The population was 1,170 as of 2010. There are 2 streets.

== Nationalities ==
Avars live there.

== Geography ==
Chokh is located 18 km southeast of Gunib (the district's administrative centre) by road. Obokh and Sogratl are the nearest rural localities.
