= Novomonastyrskoye =

Novomonastyrskoye Новомонастырское
- Selo
- Location within Republic of Dagestan Location within Russia
- Coordinates: 43°51′N 46°36′E
- Country: Russia
- Region: Republic of Dagestan
- District: Kizlyarsky District
- Time zone: UTC+3:00

Novomonastyrskoye (Russian: Новомонастырское) is a rural locality (a selo) in Novokokhanovsky Selsoviet, Kizlyarsky District, Republic of Dagestan, Russia. The population was 1,186 as of 2010. There are 9 streets.

== Geography ==
Novomonastyrskoye is located 13 km northwest of Kizlyar (the district's administrative centre) by road. Novokokhanovskoye and Novokrestyanovskoye are the nearest rural localities.

== Nationalities ==
Avars, Dargins, Russians and Kumyks live there.
