= Novaya Serebryakovka =

Novaya Serebryakovka Новая Серебряковка
- Selo
- Location within Republic of Dagestan Location within Russia
- Coordinates: 43°59′N 46°58′E
- Country: Russia
- Region: Republic of Dagestan
- District: Kizlyarsky District
- Time zone: UTC+3:00

Novaya Serebryakovka (Russian: Новая Серебряковка) is a rural locality (a selo) and the administrative centre of Novoserebryakovsky Selsoviet, Kizlyarsky District, Republic of Dagestan, Russia. The population was 764 as of 2010. There are 7 streets.

== Geography ==
Novaya Serebryakovka is located 250 km northeast of Kizlyar (the district's administrative centre) by road. Chernyayevka and Sar-Sar are the nearest rural localities.

== Demographic ==
Dargins, Chechens, Aghuls, Russians, Tabasarans, Kumyks and Avars live there.
