= Novomekhelta =

Novomekhelta Новомехельта
- Selo
- Location within Republic of Dagestan Location within Russia
- Coordinates: 43°15′N 46°32′E
- Country: Russia
- Region: Republic of Dagestan
- District: Novolaksky District
- Time zone: UTC+3:00

Novomekhelta (Russian: Новомехельта) is a rural locality (a selo) and the administrative centre of Novomekheltinsky Selsoviet, Novolaksky District, Republic of Dagestan, Russia. The population was 2,608 as of 2010. There are 50 streets.

== Geography ==
Novomekhelta is located 16 km northeast of Novolakskoye (the district's administrative centre) by road, on the right bank of the Yamansu River.

== Nationalities ==
Chechens, Avars and Laks live there.
