= Tlogob =

Tlogob Тлогоб Кьогъоб
- Selo
- Location within Republic of Dagestan Location within Russia
- Coordinates: 42°25′N 46°48′E
- Country: Russia
- Region: Republic of Dagestan
- District: Gunibsky District
- Time zone: UTC+3:00

Tlogob (Russian: Тлогоб; Avar: Кьогъоб) is a rural locality (a selo) and the administrative centre of Tlogobsky Selsoviet, Gunibsky District, Republic of Dagestan, Russia. The population was 215 as of 2010.

== Geography ==
Tlogob is located 41 km northwest of Gunib (the district's administrative centre) by road, on the Kudiyabor River. Zazilkala and Gazilala are the nearest rural localities.

== Nationalities ==
Avars live there.
