= Sredny Aradirikh =

Sredny Aradirikh Средний Арадирих БакьулӀ Гьарадерихъ
- Selo
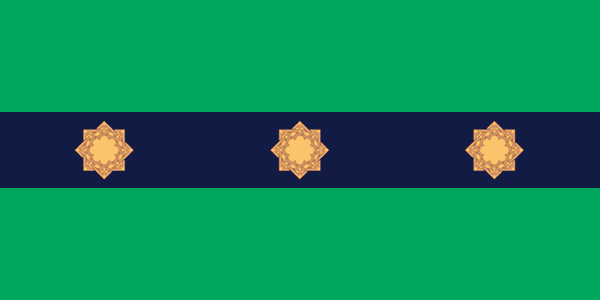
- Flag

- Location within Republic of Dagestan Location within Russia
- Coordinates: 42°40′N 46°34′E
- Country: Russia
- Region: Republic of Dagestan
- District: Gumbetovsky District
- Time zone: UTC+3:00

Sredny Aradirikh (Russian: Средний Арадирих; Avar: БакьулӀ Гьарадерихъ) is a rural locality (a selo) and the administrative centre of Aradirikhsky Selsoviet, Gumbetovsky District, Republic of Dagestan, Russia. The population was 577 as of 2010. There are 2 streets.

== Geography ==
Sredny Aradirikh is located 50 km southeast of Mekhelta (the district's administrative centre) by road. Nizhny Aradirikh and Verkhny Aradirikh are the nearest rural localities.
