= Verkhneye Inkho =

Verkhneye Inkho Верхнее Инхо ТӀаса Инхо
- Selo
- Location within Republic of Dagestan Location within Russia
- Coordinates: 42°42′N 46°30′E
- Country: Russia
- Region: Republic of Dagestan
- District: Gumbetovsky District
- Time zone: UTC+3:00

Verkhneye Inkho (Russian: Верхнее Инхо; Avar: ТӀаса Инхо) is a rural locality (a selo) in Gumbetovsky District, Republic of Dagestan, Russia. The population was 1,030 as of 2010. There are 6 streets.

== Geography ==
Verkhneye Inkho is located 33 km south of Mekhelta (the district's administrative centre) by road. Nizhneye Inkho and Chitl are the nearest rural localities.
