= Urma, Republic of Dagestan =

Urma Урма
- Selo
- Location within Republic of Dagestan Location within Russia
- Coordinates: 42°32′N 47°17′E
- Country: Russia
- Region: Republic of Dagestan
- District: Levashinsky District
- Time zone: UTC+3:00

Urma (Russian: Урма) is a rural locality (a selo) in Levashinsky District, Republic of Dagestan, Russia. The population was 3,863 as of 2010. There are 101 streets.

== Geography ==
Urma is located 14 km northwest of Levashi (the district's administrative centre) by road, on the Gerga River. Dzhangamakhi and Kulemtsa are the nearest rural localities.

== Nationalities ==
Avars live there.
