= Nizhny Karanay =

Nizhny Karanay Нижний Каранай Гъоркьияб Гъарани
- Selo
- Location within Republic of Dagestan Location within Russia
- Coordinates: 42°50′N 46°56′E
- Country: Russia
- Region: Republic of Dagestan
- District: Buynaksky District
- Time zone: UTC+3:00

Nizhny Karanay (Russian: Нижний Каранай; Avar: Гъоркьияб Гъарани) is a rural locality (a selo) in Verkhnekaranayevsky Selsoviet, Buynaksky District, Republic of Dagestan, Russia. The population was 192 as of 2010. There are 5 streets.

== Geography ==
Nizhny Karanay is located 17 km west of Buynaksk (the district's administrative centre) by road. Verkhneye Ishkarty is the nearest rural locality.
