= Kuznetsovskoye =

Kuznetsovskoye Кузнецовское
- Selo
- Location within Republic of Dagestan Location within Russia
- Coordinates: 43°54′N 46°38′E
- Country: Russia
- Region: Republic of Dagestan
- District: Tarumovsky District
- Time zone: UTC+3:00

Kuznetsovskoye (Russian: Кузнецовское) is a rural locality (a selo) in Novogeorgiyevsky Selsoviet, Tarumovsky District, Republic of Dagestan, Russia. Population: 486 (2010 census); 432 (2002 census); 194 (1989 Soviet census).

== Geography ==
Kuznetsovskoye is located 22 km south of Tarumovka (the district's administrative centre) by road. Bondarenovskoye and Novogeorgiyevka are the nearest rural localities.
