= Murguk =

Locality in Republic of Dagestan, Russia

Murguk Мургук
- Selo
- Location within Republic of Dagestan Location within Russia
- Coordinates: 42°15′N 47°41′E
- Country: Russia
- Region: Republic of Dagestan
- District: Sergokalinsky District
- Time zone: UTC+3:00

Murguk (Russian: Мургук) is a rural locality (a selo) in Sergokalinsky District, Republic of Dagestan, Russia. Population: 1,631 (2010 census); 1,951 (2002 census); 1,110 (1989 Soviet census). There is 1 street.

== Geography ==
Murguk is located 105 km south of Makhachkala. Baltamakhi and Kanasiragi are the nearest rural localities.

== Nationalities ==
Dargins live there.

== Famous residents ==
- Ramazan Shakhnavazov (Prosecutor of the Republic of Dagestan)
