= Bezhuda =

Bezhuda Бежуда
- Selo
- Location within Republic of Dagestan Location within Russia
- Coordinates: 42°12′N 46°28′E
- Country: Russia
- Region: Dagestan
- District: Tlyaratinsky District
- Time zone: UTC+3:00

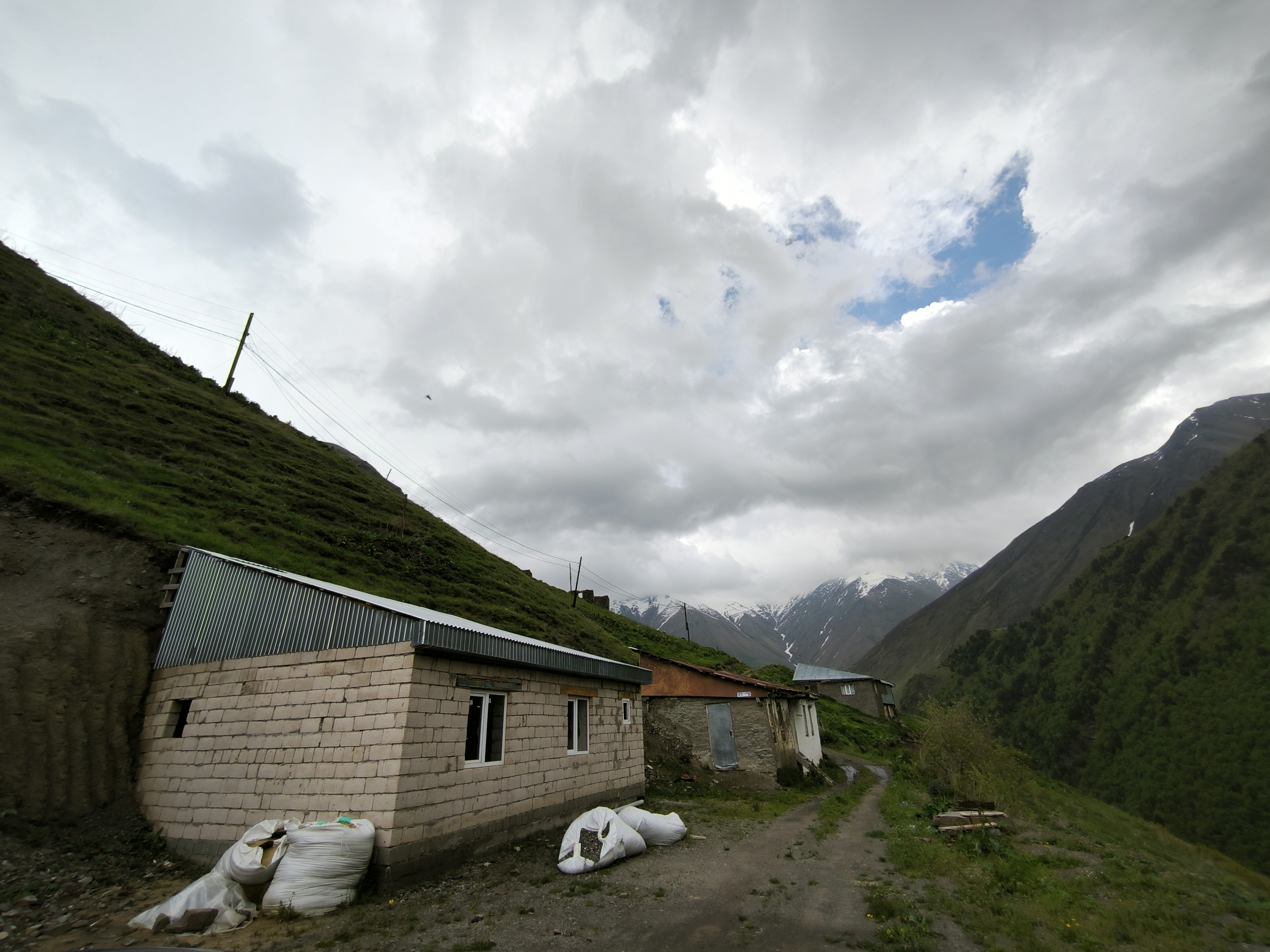

Bezhuda (Russian: Бежуда) is a rural locality (a selo) in Nachadinsky Selsoviet, Tlyaratinsky District, Dagestan, Russia. Population: 32 (2010 census); 86 (2002 census); 112 (1989 Soviet census).

== Geography ==
Bezhuda is located 33 km northeast of Tlyarata (the district's administrative centre) by road. Tinchuda is the nearest rural locality.
