= Yuny Pakhar =

Yuny Pakhar Юный Пахарь Јуны Пахар
- Selo
- Location within Republic of Dagestan Location within Russia
- Coordinates: 42°10′N 48°09′E
- Country: Russia
- Region: Republic of Dagestan
- District: Derbentsky District
- Time zone: UTC+3:00

Yuny Pakhar (Russian: Юный Пахарь; Azerbaijani: Јуны Пахар, Yunı Paxar) is a rural locality (a selo) in Pervomaysky Selsoviet, Derbentsky District, Republic of Dagestan, Russia. The population was 475 as of 2010. There are 12 streets.

== Geography ==
Yuny Pakhar is located 23 km northwest of Derbent (the district's administrative centre) by road. Duzlak and Imeni Michurina are the nearest rural localities.

== Nationalities ==
Dargins, Azerbaijanis and Tabasarans live there.
