= Arachanamakhi =

Arachanamakhi Арачанамахи Арачанамахьи
- Selo
- Location within Republic of Dagestan Location within Russia
- Coordinates: 42°19′N 47°35′E
- Country: Russia
- Region: Republic of Dagestan
- District: Sergokalinsky District
- Time zone: UTC+3:00

Arachanamakhi (Russian: Арачанамахи; Dargwa: Арачанамахьи) is a rural locality (a selo) in Nizhnemulebkinsky Selsoviet, Sergokalinsky District, Republic of Dagestan, Russia. The population was 189 as of 2010. There is 1 street.

== Geography ==
It is located 29 km southwest from Sergokala. Tsurmakhi and Ullukimakhi are the nearest rural localities.

== Nationalities ==
Dargins live there.
