= Novogladovka =

Novogladovka Новогладовка
- Selo
- Location within Republic of Dagestan Location within Russia
- Coordinates: 43°51′N 46°53′E
- Country: Russia
- Region: Republic of Dagestan
- District: Kizlyarsky District
- Time zone: UTC+3:00

Novogladovka (Russian: Новогладовка) is a rural locality (a selo) in Bolshezadoyevsky Selsoviet, Kizlyarsky District, Republic of Dagestan, Russia. The population was 413 as of 2010. There are 5 streets.

== Geography ==
Novogladovka is located 17 km east of Kizlyar (the district's administrative centre) by road, on the left bank of the Stary Terk River. Mulla-Ali and Malaya Zadovka are the nearest rural localities.

== Nationalities ==
Avars live there.
