= Sangar, Republic of Dagestan =

Sangar Сангар
- Selo
- Location within Republic of Dagestan Location within Russia
- Coordinates: 43°35′N 47°10′E
- Country: Russia
- Region: Republic of Dagestan
- District: Laksky District
- Time zone: UTC+3:00

Sangar (Russian: Сангар) is a rural locality (a selo) in Kamakhalsky Selsoviet, Laksky District, Republic of Dagestan, Russia. The population was 203 as of 2010.

== Nationalities ==
Laks live there.
