= Galatli =

Galatli Галатли
- Selo
- Location within Republic of Dagestan Location within Russia
- Coordinates: 42°17′N 45°53′E
- Country: Russia
- Region: Republic of Dagestan
- District: Tsuntinsky District
- Time zone: UTC+3:00

Galatli (Russian: Галатли) is a rural locality (a selo) in Tsuntinsky District, Republic of Dagestan, Russia. Population: 42 (2021 census); 18 (2002 census); 28 (1989 Soviet census). There is 1 street in this selo.

== Geography ==
Selo is located 152 km from Makhachkala (capital of Dagestan) and 1,645 km from Moscow. Derikh is the nearest rural locality.
