= Gagar, Republic of Dagestan =

Gagar Гагар Гьагьар
- Selo
- Location within Republic of Dagestan Location within Russia
- Coordinates: 41°59′N 46°35′E
- Country: Russia
- Region: Republic of Dagestan
- District: Tlyaratinsky District
- Time zone: UTC+3:00

Gagar (Russian: Гагар; Avar: Гьагьар) is a rural locality (a selo) in Kolobsky Selsoviet, Tlyaratinsky District, Republic of Dagestan, Russia. Population: 660 (2010 census); 443 (2002 census); 330 (1989 Soviet census).

== Geography ==
Gagar is located 35 km southeast of Tlyarata (the district's administrative centre) by road. Tsimguda is the nearest rural locality.
