= Selo imeni Kirova =

Selo imeni Kirova Село имени Кирова
- Selo
- Location within Republic of Dagestan Location within Russia
- Coordinates: 43°51′N 46°42′E
- Country: Russia
- Region: Republic of Dagestan
- District: Kizlyarsky District
- Time zone: UTC+3:00

Selo imeni Kirova (Russian: Село имени Кирова) is a rural locality (a selo) in Yuzhny Selsoviet, Kizlyarsky District, Republic of Dagestan, Russia. The population was 674 as of 2010. There are 9 streets.

== Geography ==
Selo imeni Kirova is located 2 km northwest of Kizlyar (the district's administrative centre) by road. Kizlyar and Krasnyy Voskhod are the nearest rural localities.

== Nationalities ==
Avars, Russians, Dargins, Kumyks, Azerbaijanis and Armenians live there.
