= Goa, Republic of Dagestan =

Goa Гоа
- Selo
- Location within Republic of Dagestan Location within Russia
- Coordinates: 41°45′N 47°42′E
- Country: Russia
- Region: Republic of Dagestan
- District: Agulsky District
- Time zone: UTC+3:00

Goa (Russian: Гоа) is a rural locality (a selo) in Burshagsky Selsoviet, Agulsky District, Republic of Dagestan, Russia. The population was 475 as of 2010.

== Geography ==
Goa is located 11 km southeast of Tpig (the district's administrative centre) by road. Duldug is the nearest rural locality.
