= Ulluchara =

Ulluchara Уллучара
- Selo
- Location within Republic of Dagestan Location within Russia
- Coordinates: 42°12′N 47°16′E
- Country: Russia
- Region: Republic of Dagestan
- District: Akushinsky District
- Time zone: UTC+3:00

Ulluchara (Russian: Уллучара) is a rural locality (a selo) in Akushinsky District, Republic of Dagestan, Russia. The population was 392 as of 2010. There are 15 streets.

== Geography ==
Ulluchara is located 15 km southwest of Akusha (the district's administrative centre) by road. Gapshima is the nearest rural locality.
