= Krasny Voskhod, Republic of Dagestan =

Krasny Voskhod Красный Восход
- Selo
- Location within Republic of Dagestan Location within Russia
- Coordinates: 43°51′N 46°40′E
- Country: Russia
- Region: Republic of Dagestan
- District: Kizlyarsky District
- Time zone: UTC+3:00

Krasny Voskhod (Russian: Красный Восход) is a rural locality (a selo) in Krasnoarmeysky Selsoviet, Kizlyarsky District, Republic of Dagestan, Russia. The population was 1,684 as of 2010. There are 23 streets.

== Geography ==
Krasny Voskhod is located 4 km northwest of Kizlyar (the district's administrative centre) by road. Imeni Zhdanova and Imeni Kirova are the nearest rural localities.

== Nationalities ==
Avars, Russians, Laks, Tsakhurs, Dargins and Rutuls live there.
