= Chirkata =

Chirkata Чирката ЧӀиркъатӀа
- Selo
- Location within Republic of Dagestan Location within Russia
- Coordinates: 42°47′N 46°43′E
- Country: Russia
- Region: Republic of Dagestan
- District: Gumbetovsky District
- Time zone: UTC+3:00

Chirkata (Russian: Чирката; Avar: ЧӀиркъатӀа) is a rural locality (a selo) in Gumbetovsky District, Republic of Dagestan, Russia. The population was 1,923 as of 2010. There are 15 streets.

== Geography ==
Chirkata is located 29 km east of Mekhelta (the district's administrative centre) by road. Ashilta and Kakhabroso are the nearest rural localities.
