= Prigorodnoye, Republic of Dagestan =

Prigorodnoye Пригородное
- Selo
- Location within Republic of Dagestan Location within Russia
- Coordinates: 43°52′N 46°43′E
- Country: Russia
- Region: Republic of Dagestan
- District: Kizlyarsky District
- Time zone: UTC+3:00

Prigorodnoye (Russian: Пригородное) is a rural locality (a selo) in Kizlyarsky Selsoviet, Kizlyarsky District, Republic of Dagestan, Russia. The population was 484 as of 2010. There are 7 streets.

== Geography ==
It is located on the left bank of the Stary Terek River.

== Nationalities ==
Russians, Avars, Tabasarans, Tsakhurs, Dargins, Rutuls, Kumyks and Ukrainians live there.
