= Rushukha =

Rushukha Рушуха
- Selo
- Location within Republic of Dagestan Location within Russia
- Coordinates: 42°42′N 46°16′E
- Country: Russia
- Region: Republic of Dagestan
- District: Botlikhsky District
- Time zone: UTC+3:00

Rushukha (Russian: Рушуха) is a rural locality (a selo) in Muninsky Selsoviet, Botlikhsky District, Republic of Dagestan, Russia. The population was 57 as of 2010.

== Geography ==
Rushukha is located 16 km northeast of Botlikh (the district's administrative centre) by road. Shivor is the nearest rural locality.
