= Verkhneye Ishkarty =

Verkhneye Ishkarty Верхнее Ишкарты
- Selo
- Location within Republic of Dagestan Location within Russia
- Coordinates: 42°50′N 46°57′E
- Country: Russia
- Region: Republic of Dagestan
- District: Buynaksky District
- Time zone: UTC+3:00

Verkhneye Ishkarty (Russian: Верхнее Ишкарты) is a rural locality (a selo) in Ishkartinsky Selsoviet, Buynaksky District, Republic of Dagestan, Russia. The population was 378 as of 2010. There are 14 streets.

== Geography ==
Verkhneye Ishkarty is located 15 km northwest of Buynaksk (the district's administrative centre) by road. Nizhneye Ishkarty is the nearest rural locality.
