= Gisik =

Gisik Гисик
- Selo
- Location within Republic of Dagestan Location within Russia
- Coordinates: 41°56′N 47°54′E
- Country: Russia
- Region: Republic of Dagestan
- District: Tabasaransky District
- Time zone: UTC+3:00

Gisik (Russian: Гисик) is a rural locality (a selo) in Guriksky Selsoviet, Tabasaransky District, Republic of Dagestan, Russia. Population: 293 (2010 census); 390 (2002 census); 245 (1989 Soviet census). There are 2 streets.

== Geography ==
Gisik is located 7 km west of Khuchni (the district's administrative centre) by road. Gyugryag is the nearest rural locality.
