= Mikik =

Mikik Микик
- Selo
- Location within Republic of Dagestan Location within Russia
- Coordinates: 41°38′N 47°10′E
- Country: Russia
- Region: Republic of Dagestan
- District: Rutulsky District
- Time zone: UTC+3:00

Mikik (Russian: Микик) is a rural locality (a selo) in Tsakhurskoye Rural Settlement, Rutulsky District, Republic of Dagestan, Russia. Population: 532 (2010 census); 370 (2002 census); 453 (1989 Soviet census). There are 3 streets.

== Geography ==
Mikik is located on the Samur river, 31 km northwest of Rutul (the district's administrative centre) by road. Gelmets and Khiyakh are the nearest rural localities.

== Nationalities ==
Tsakhurs live there.
