= Novoromanovka =

Novoromanovka Новоромановка
- Selo
- Location within Republic of Dagestan Location within Russia
- Coordinates: 43°57′N 46°38′E
- Country: Russia
- Region: Republic of Dagestan
- District: Tarumovsky District
- Time zone: UTC+3:00

Novoromanovka (Russian: Новоромановка) is a rural locality (a selo) in Tarumovsky District, Republic of Dagestan, Russia. Population: 1,322 (2021 census); 1,132 (2002 census); 863 (1989 Soviet census). There are 10 streets.

== Geography ==
Novoromanovka is located 24 km southeast of Tarumovka (the district's administrative centre) by road. Novogeorgiyevka is the nearest rural locality.
