= Bryansky Rybzavod =

Bryansky Rybzavod Брянский Рыбзавод
- Selo
- Location within Republic of Dagestan Location within Russia
- Coordinates: 44°18′N 47°02′E
- Country: Russia
- Region: Republic of Dagestan
- District: Kizlyarsky District
- Time zone: UTC+3:00

Bryansky Rybzavod (Russian: Брянский Рыбзавод) is a rural locality (a selo) in Bryansky Selsoviet, Kizlyarsky District, Republic of Dagestan, Russia. The population was 61 as of 2010. There is 1 street.

== Geography ==
It is located 63 km northeast of Kizlyar, 5 km southeast from Bryansk.

== Nationalities ==
Dargins, Avars and Russians live there.
