= Oratyube =

Oratyube Ортатюбе Орта-Тоьбе
- Selo
- Location within Republic of Dagestan Location within Russia
- Coordinates: 44°14′N 45°16′E
- Country: Russia
- Region: Republic of Dagestan
- District: Nogaysky District
- Time zone: UTC+3:00

Oratyube (Russian: Ортатюбе; Nogai: Орта-Тоьбе, Orta-Töbe) is a rural locality (a selo) and the administrative centre of Oratyubinsky Selsoviet, Nogaysky District, Republic of Dagestan, Russia. Population: 1,099 (2010 census); 1,157 (2002 census); 758 (1989 Soviet census). There are 18 streets. Ortatyube was founded in 1914.

== Geography ==
It is located 49 km northwest from Terekli-Mekteb.

== Nationalities ==
Nogais, Dargins and Kabardians live there.
