= Zilo, Republic of Dagestan =

Zilo Зило
- Selo
- Location within Republic of Dagestan Location within Russia
- Coordinates: 42°43′N 46°19′E
- Country: Russia
- Region: Republic of Dagestan
- District: Botlikhsky District
- Time zone: UTC+3:00

Zilo (Russian: Зило) is a rural locality (a selo) in Botlikhsky District, Republic of Dagestan, Russia. The population was 1,215 as of 2010. There are 8 streets.

== Geography ==
Zilo is located 32 km southeast of Botlikh (the district's administrative centre) by road, on the left bank of the Unsatlen River. Kizhani is the nearest rural locality.
