= Khutkhul =

Khutkhul Хутхул
- Selo
- Location within Republic of Dagestan Location within Russia
- Coordinates: 41°47′N 47°36′E
- Country: Russia
- Region: Republic of Dagestan
- District: Agulsky District
- Time zone: UTC+3:00

Khutkhul (Russian: Хутхул) is a rural locality (a selo) and the administrative centre of Khutkhulsky Selsoviet, Agulsky District, Republic of Dagestan, Russia. The population was 628 as of 2010.

== Geography ==
Khutkhul is located on the Chiragchay River, 3 km east of Tpig (the district's administrative centre) by road. Tpig is the nearest rural locality.
