= Nakhi, Republic of Dagestan =

Nakhi Нахки
- Selo
- Location within Republic of Dagestan Location within Russia
- Coordinates: 42°04′N 47°23′E
- Country: Russia
- Region: Republic of Dagestan
- District: Akushinsky District
- Time zone: UTC+3:00

Nakhi (Russian: Нахки) is a rural locality (a selo) and the administrative centre of Nakhkinsky Selsoviet, Akushinsky District, Republic of Dagestan, Russia. The population was 415 as of 2010. There are 3 streets.

== Geography ==
Nakhi is located 36 km southeast of Akusha (the district's administrative centre) by road, on the Dargolakotta River. Natsi is the nearest rural locality.
