= Shagada =

Shagada Шагада
- Selo
- Location within Republic of Dagestan Location within Russia
- Coordinates: 43°28′N 46°43′E
- Country: Russia
- Region: Republic of Dagestan
- District: Khasavyurtovsky District
- Time zone: UTC+3:00

Shagada (Russian: Шагада) is a rural locality (a selo) in Khasavyurtovsky District, Republic of Dagestan, Russia. Population: 1,534 (2021 census); 887 (2002 census); 680 (1989 Soviet census). There are 13 streets.

== Geography ==
Shagada is located 35 km north of Khasavyurt (the district's administrative centre) by road. Kutan Butush is the nearest rural locality.
