= Burdeki =

Burdeki Бурдеки
- Selo
- Location within Republic of Dagestan Location within Russia
- Coordinates: 42°18′N 47°40′E
- Country: Russia
- Region: Republic of Dagestan
- District: Sergokalinsky District
- Time zone: UTC+3:00

Burdeki (Russian: Бурдеки) is a rural locality (a selo) and the administrative centre of Burdekinskoye Rural Settlement, Sergokalinsky District, Republic of Dagestan, Russia. Population: 652 (2010 census); 716 (2002 census); 576 (1989 Soviet census). There is 1 street.

== Geography ==
Burdeki is located 23 km south of Sergokala (the district's administrative centre) by road, on the Burdekikherk River. Kichi-Gamri and Nizhneye Makhargimakhi are the nearest rural localities.

== Nationalities ==
Dargins live there.
