= Arada, Republic of Dagestan =

Arada Арада
- Selo
- Location within Republic of Dagestan Location within Russia
- Coordinates: 43°18′N 47°09′E
- Country: Russia
- Region: Republic of Dagestan
- District: Khunzakhsky District
- Time zone: UTC+3:00

Arada (Russian: Арада) is a rural locality (a selo) in Batlaichsky Selsoviet, Khunzakhsky District, Republic of Dagestan, Russia. Population: 673 (2010 census); 712 (2002 census); 574 (1989 Soviet census).

== Geography ==
It is located 93 km from Khunzakh (the district's administrative centre), 47 km from Makhachkala (capital of Dagestan) and 1,584 km from Moscow. Darada-Murada is the nearest rural locality.
