= Boranchi =

Boranchi Боранчи Бораншы
- Selo
- Location within Republic of Dagestan Location within Russia
- Coordinates: 44°13′N 45°31′E
- Country: Russia
- Region: Republic of Dagestan
- District: Nogaysky District
- Time zone: UTC+3:00

Boranchi (Russian: Боранчи; Nogai: Бораншы, Boranşı) is a rural locality (a selo) in Karagassky Selsoviet, Nogaysky District, Republic of Dagestan, Russia. The population was 545 as of 2010. There are 11 streets.

== Geography ==
It is located 27 km northwest of Terekli-Mekteb.

== Nationalities ==
Nogais live there.
