= Irgali =

Irgali Иргали Иргъалимахьи
- Selo
- Location within Republic of Dagestan Location within Russia
- Coordinates: 42°24′N 47°08′E
- Country: Russia
- Region: Republic of Dagestan
- District: Levashinsky District
- Time zone: UTC+3:00

Irgali (Russian: Иргали; Dargwa: Иргъалимахьи) is a rural locality (a selo) in Kuppinsky Selsoviet, Levashinsky District, Republic of Dagestan, Russia. The population was 206 as of 2010.

== Geography ==
It is located 15 km west of Levashi.

== Nationalities ==
Dargins live there.
