= Kerlikent =

Village in Republic of Dagestan, Russia

Kerlikent Керликент
- Selo
- Location within Republic of Dagestan Location within Russia
- Coordinates: 44°01′N 46°45′E
- Country: Russia
- Region: Republic of Dagestan
- District: Kizlyarsky District
- Time zone: UTC+3:00

Kerlikent (Russian: Керликент) is a rural locality (a selo) in Maloareshevsky Selsoviet, Kizlyarsky District, Republic of Dagestan, Russia. The population was 196 as of 2010, and the village has two streets.

== Geography ==
Kerlikent is located 28 km northeast of Kizlyar (the district's administrative centre) by road. Vishe-Talovka and Plodopitomnik are the nearest rural localities.

== Nationalities ==
Avars, Kumyks, Dargins, Chechens and Armenians live there.
