= Novy Chirkey =

Novy Chirkey Новый Чиркей Цӏияб Чӏикӏаб
- Selo
- Location within Republic of Dagestan Location within Russia
- Coordinates: 43°09′N 47°03′E
- Country: Russia
- Region: Republic of Dagestan
- District: Kizilyurtovsky District
- Time zone: UTC+3:00

Novy Chirkey (Russian: Новый Чиркей; Avar: Цӏияб Чӏикӏаб) is a rural locality (a selo) in Kizilyurtovsky District, Republic of Dagestan, Russia. The population was 5,922 as of 2010. There are 67 streets.

== Geography ==
Novy Chirkey is located 20 km southeast of Kizilyurt (the district's administrative centre) by road. Kulzeb and Khachta are the nearest rural localities.

== Nationalities ==
Avars live there.
