= Sagasi-Deybuk =

Sagasi-Deybuk Сагаси-Дейбук
- Selo
- Location within Republic of Dagestan Location within Russia
- Coordinates: 42°30′N 47°50′E
- Country: Russia
- Region: Republic of Dagestan
- District: Kayakentsky District
- Time zone: UTC+3:00

Sagasi-Deybuk (Russian: Сагаси-Дейбук) is a rural locality (a selo) and the administrative centre of Sagasi-Deybuksky Selsoviet, Kayakentsky District, Republic of Dagestan, Russia. The population was 1,986 as of 2010. There are 24 streets.

== Geography ==
Sagasi-Deybuk is located 29 km northwest of Novokayakent (the district's administrative centre) by road. Karanayaul and Pervomayskoye are the nearest rural localities.

== Nationalities ==
Dagins and Kumyks live there.
