= Ingishi =

Ingishi Ингиши
- Selo
- Location within Republic of Dagestan Location within Russia
- Coordinates: 42°46′N 46°32′E
- Country: Russia
- Region: Republic of Dagestan
- District: Gumbetovsky District
- Time zone: UTC+3:00

Ingishi (Russian: Ингиши) is a rural locality (a selo) in Gumbetovsky District, Republic of Dagestan, Russia. The population was 840 as of 2010. There are 8 streets.

== Geography ==
Ingishi is located 10 km southeast of Mekhelta (the district's administrative centre) by road. Tlyarata and Mekhelta are the nearest rural localities.
