= Batyr-Murza =

Batyr-Murza Батыр-Мурза Батырмырза
- Selo
- Location within Republic of Dagestan Location within Russia
- Coordinates: 44°10′N 45°41′E
- Country: Russia
- Region: Republic of Dagestan
- District: Nogaysky District
- Time zone: UTC+3:00

Batyr-Murza (Russian: Батыр-Мурза; Nogai: Батырмырза, Batırmırza) is a rural locality (a selo) in Koktyubinsky Selsoviet, Nogaysky District, Republic of Dagestan, Russia. Population: 624 (2010 census); 555 (2002 census); 490 (1989 Soviet census). There are 12 streets.

== Geography ==
It is located 14 km of from Terekli-Mekteb.

== Nationalities ==
Nogais live there.
