= Kharada =

Kharada Харада Хорода
- Selo
- Location within Republic of Dagestan Location within Russia
- Coordinates: 42°13′N 46°15′E
- Country: Russia
- Region: Republic of Dagestan
- District: Tlyaratinsky District
- Time zone: UTC+3:00

Kharada (Russian: Харада; Avar: Хорода) is a rural locality (a selo) in Shidibsky Selsoviet, Tlyaratinsky District, Republic of Dagestan, Russia. Population: 309 (2010 census); 146 (2002 census); 158 (1989 Soviet census).

== Geography ==
Kharada is located 26 km northwest of Tlyarata (the district's administrative centre) by road. Khadakolob is the nearest rural locality.
