= Sulutyube =

Sulutyube Сулутюбе
- Selo
- Location within Republic of Dagestan Location within Russia
- Coordinates: 44°08′N 45°49′E
- Country: Russia
- Region: Republic of Dagestan
- District: Nogaysky District
- Time zone: UTC+3:00

Sulutyube (Russian: Сулутюбе) is a rural locality (a selo) in Karasuvsky Selsoviet, Nogaysky District, Republic of Dagestan, Russia. Population: 49 (2010 census); 60 (2002 census); 55 (1989 Soviet census). There are 2 streets.

== Geography ==
It is located 5 km southwest of Terekli-Mekteb.

== Nationalities ==
Nogais live there.

== Famous residents ==
- Kadyr Sabutov (Hero of Socialist Labor)
- Kamov Sabutov (Hero of Socialist Labor)
