= Akaytala =

Akaytala Акайтала Ахъайтала
- Selo
- Location within Republic of Dagestan Location within Russia
- Coordinates: 43°01′N 46°55′E
- Country: Russia
- Region: Republic of Dagestan
- District: Buynaksky District
- Time zone: UTC+3:00

Akaytala (Russian: Акайтала; Avar: Ахъайтала) is a rural locality (a selo) in Buynaksky District, Republic of Dagestan, Russia. The population was 688 as of 2010. There are 8 streets.

== Geography ==
Akaytala is located 37 km northwest of Buynaksk (the district's administrative centre) by road. Dubki is the nearest rural locality.
