= Novonadezhdovka =

Novonadezhdovka Новонадеждовка
- Selo
- Location within Republic of Dagestan Location within Russia
- Coordinates: 43°50′N 46°55′E
- Country: Russia
- Region: Republic of Dagestan
- District: Kizlyarsky District
- Time zone: UTC+3:00

Novonadezhdovka (Russian: Новонадеждовка) is a rural locality (a selo) in Kardonovsky Selsoviet, Kizlyarsky District, Republic of Dagestan, Russia. The population was 69 as of 2010.

== Geography ==
Novonadezhdovka is located 18 km east of Kizlyar (the district's administrative centre) by road. Nekrasovka and Kokhanovskoye are the nearest rural localities.

== Nationalities ==
Dargins and Avars live there.
