= Ivaylazda =

Ivaylazda Ивайлазда
- Selo
- Location within Republic of Dagestan Location within Russia
- Coordinates: 42°25′N 46°47′E
- Country: Russia
- Region: Republic of Dagestan
- District: Gunibsky District
- Time zone: UTC+3:00

Ivaylazda (Russian: Ивайлазда) is a rural locality (a selo) in Tlogobsky Selsoviet, Gunibsky District, Republic of Dagestan, Russia. The population was 70 as of 2010.

== Geography ==
Ivaylazda is located 44 km northwest of Gunib (the district's administrative centre) by road, on the Kunada River. Basar and Baldutl are the nearest rural localities.
