= Mazada, Republic of Dagestan =

Mazada Мазада
- Selo
- Location within Republic of Dagestan Location within Russia
- Coordinates: 42°11′N 46°23′E
- Country: Russia
- Region: Republic of Dagestan
- District: Tlyaratinsky District
- Time zone: UTC+3:00

Mazada (Russian: Мазада) is a rural locality (a selo) and the administrative center of Mazadinsky Selsoviet, Tlyaratinsky District, Republic of Dagestan, Russia. Population: 195 (2010 census); 533 (2002 census); 193 (1989 Soviet census).

== Geography ==
Mazada is located 25 km north of Tlyarata (the district's administrative centre) by road. Rosta is the nearest rural locality.
