= Tsibari =

Tsibari Цибари
- Selo
- Location within Republic of Dagestan Location within Russia
- Coordinates: 42°15′N 45°52′E
- Country: Russia
- Region: Republic of Dagestan
- District: Tsuntinsky District
- Time zone: UTC+3:00

Tsibari (Russian: Цибари) is a rural locality (a selo) in Tsuntinsky District, Republic of Dagestan, Russia. Population: 238 (2021 census); 353 (2002 census); 319 (1989 Soviet census).

== Geography ==
Tsibari is located on a mountain slope, 155 km from Makhachkala (capital of Dagestan) and 1,648 km from Moscow. Takkho is the nearest rural locality. Tsibari is 19 Km away from the Georgian border.
