= Kosob =

Kosob Кособ КӀособ
- Selo
- Location within Republic of Dagestan Location within Russia
- Coordinates: 42°14′N 46°22′E
- Country: Russia
- Region: Republic of Dagestan
- District: Tlyaratinsky District
- Time zone: UTC+3:00

Kosob (Russian: Кособ; Avar: КӀособ) is a rural locality (a selo) and the administrative center of Kosobsky Selsoviet, Tlyaratinsky District, Republic of Dagestan, Russia. Population: 244 (2010 census); 195 (2002 census); 132 (1989 Soviet census). There are 5 streets.

== Geography ==
Kosob is located 22 km north of Tlyarata (the district's administrative centre) by road. Busutli is the nearest rural locality.
