= Betli =

Betli Бетли Бекьилъ
- Selo
- Location within Republic of Dagestan Location within Russia
- Coordinates: 42°43′N 46°43′E
- Country: Russia
- Region: Republic of Dagestan
- District: Untsukulsky District
- Time zone: UTC+3:00

Betli (Russian: Бетли; Avar: Бекьилъ) is a rural locality (a selo) in Kakhabrosinsky Selsoviet, Untsukulsky District, Republic of Dagestan, Russia. Population: 20 (2010 census); 25 (2002 census); 0 (1989 Soviet census).

== Geography ==
Betli is located 24 km northwest of Shamilkala (the district's administrative centre) by road. Kakhabroso is the nearest rural locality.
