= Aladash =

Aladash Аладаш
- Selo
- Location within Republic of Dagestan Location within Russia
- Coordinates: 41°54′N 48°20′E
- Country: Russia
- Region: Republic of Dagestan
- District: Kurakhsky District
- Time zone: UTC+3:00

Aladash (Russian: Аладаш) is a rural locality (a selo) in Kurakhsky District, Republic of Dagestan, Russia. The population was 1,053 as of 2010. There are 21 streets.

== Geography ==
Aladash is located 84 km northeast of Kurakh (the district's administrative centre) by road. Rubas and Mollakent are the nearest rural localities.

== Nationalities ==
Lezgins live there.
