= Nizhny Keger =

Nizhny Keger Нижний Кегер Гъоркьа КӀогьориб
- Selo
- Location within Republic of Dagestan Location within Russia
- Coordinates: 42°24′N 46°58′E
- Country: Russia
- Region: Republic of Dagestan
- District: Gunibsky District
- Time zone: UTC+3:00

Nizhny Keger (Russian: Нижний Кегер; Avar: Гъоркьа КӀогьориб) is a rural locality (a selo) in Kegersky Selsoviet, Gunibsky District, Republic of Dagestan, Russia. The population was 208 as of 2010.

== Geography ==
Nizhny Keger is located 6 km northeast of Gunib (the district's administrative centre) by road. Khindakh and Khotoch are the nearest rural localities.
