= Novy Biryuzyak =

Novy Biryuzyak Новый Бирюзяк
- Selo
- Location within Republic of Dagestan Location within Russia
- Coordinates: 43°46′N 47°17′E
- Country: Russia
- Region: Republic of Dagestan
- District: Kizlyarsky District
- Time zone: UTC+3:00

Novy Biryuzyak (Russian: Новый Бирюзяк) is a rural locality (a selo) in Kizlyarsky District, Republic of Dagestan, Russia. The population was 909 as of 2010. There are 8 streets.

== Geography ==
Novy Biryuzyak is located 97 km southeast of Kizlyar (the district's administrative centre) by road, on the Kordonka River. Staro-Terechnoye and Kollektivizator are the nearest rural localities.

== Nationalities ==
Avars, Russians and Laks live there.
