= Kulzeb =

Kulzeb Кульзеб КІулзеб
- Selo
- Location within Republic of Dagestan Location within Russia
- Coordinates: 43°10′N 47°00′E
- Country: Russia
- Region: Republic of Dagestan
- District: Kizilyurtovsky District
- Time zone: UTC+3:00

Kulzeb (Russian: Кульзеб; Avar: КІулзеб) is a rural locality (a selo) in Kizilyurtovsky District, Republic of Dagestan, Russia. The population was 2,028 as of 2010. There are 19 streets.

== Geography ==
Kulzeb is located 17 km northwest of Kizilyurt (the district's administrative centre) by road. Novaya Chirkey and Stalskoye are the nearest rural localities.

== Nationalities ==
AVars, Laks, Dargins and Kumyks live there.
