= Nukhotkolob =

Nukhog Нухотколоб
- Selo
- Location within Republic of Dagestan Location within Russia
- Coordinates: 42°13′N 46°15′E
- Country: Russia
- Time zone: UTC+3:00

Nukhotkolob (Russian: Нухотколоб) is a rural locality (a selo) in Shidibsky Selsoviet, Tlyaratinsky District, Republic of Dagestan, Russia. Population: 46 (2010 census); 21 (2002 census); 16 (1989 Soviet census).

== Geography ==
Nukhotkolob is located 22 km northwest of Tlyarata (the district's administrative centre) by road. Khadakolob is the nearest rural locality.
