= Arussi, Republic of Dagestan =

Rural locality in Russia

Arussi Арусси
- Selo
- Location within Republic of Dagestan Location within Russia
- Coordinates: 43°32′N 47°14′E
- Country: Russia
- Region: Republic of Dagestan
- District: Laksky District
- Time zone: UTC+3:00

Arussi (Russian: Арусси) is a rural locality (or selo) in Karashinsky Selsoviet, Laksky District, Republic of Dagestan, Russia.

In 2010, the population was 182.

== Geography ==
Arussi is located 242 km (150 mi) north of the district's administrative centre Kumukh.
