= Buskri =

Buskri Бускри
- Selo
- Location within Republic of Dagestan Location within Russia
- Coordinates: 42°10′N 47°40′E
- Country: Russia
- Region: Republic of Dagestan
- District: Dakhadayevsky District
- Time zone: UTC+3:00

Buskri (Russian: Бускри) is a rural locality (a selo) and the administrative centre of Buskrinsky Selsoviet, Dakhadayevsky District, Republic of Dagestan, Russia. The population was 686 as of 2010. There are 3 streets.

== Geography ==
Buskri is located 6 km northeast of Urkarakh (the district's administrative centre) by road. Gunakari and Dibgashi are the nearest rural localities.
