= Rugun =

Rugun Ругун
- Selo
- Location within Republic of Dagestan Location within Russia
- Coordinates: 41°35′N 47°59′E
- Country: Russia
- Region: Republic of Dagestan
- District: Kurakhsky District
- Time zone: UTC+3:00

Rugun (Russian: Ругун) is a rural locality (a selo) in Ikrinsky Selsoviet, Kurakhsky District, Republic of Dagestan, Russia. The population was 151 as of 2010.

== Geography ==
Rugun is located 34 km northeast of Kurakh (the district's administrative centre) by road, on the Rugunchay River. Ikra and Khatsug are the nearest rural localities.

== Nationalities ==
Lezgins live there.
