= Obonub =

Rural locality in Republic of Dagestan, Russia

Obonub Обонуб ГӀобонуб
- Selo
- Location within Republic of Dagestan Location within Russia
- Coordinates: 42°24′N 46°50′E
- Country: Russia
- Region: Republic of Dagestan
- District: Gunibsky District
- Time zone: UTC+3:00

Obonub (Russian: Обонуб; Avar: ГӀобонуб) is a rural locality (a selo) in Tlogobsky Selsoviet, Gunibsky District, Republic of Dagestan, Russia. The population was 46 as of 2010.

== Geography ==
Obonub is located 45 km northwest of Gunib (the district's administrative centre) by road, on the Kudiyabor River. Egeda and Khamagib are the nearest rural localities.

== Nationalities ==
Avars live there.
