= Arsug =

Arsug Арсуг
- Selo
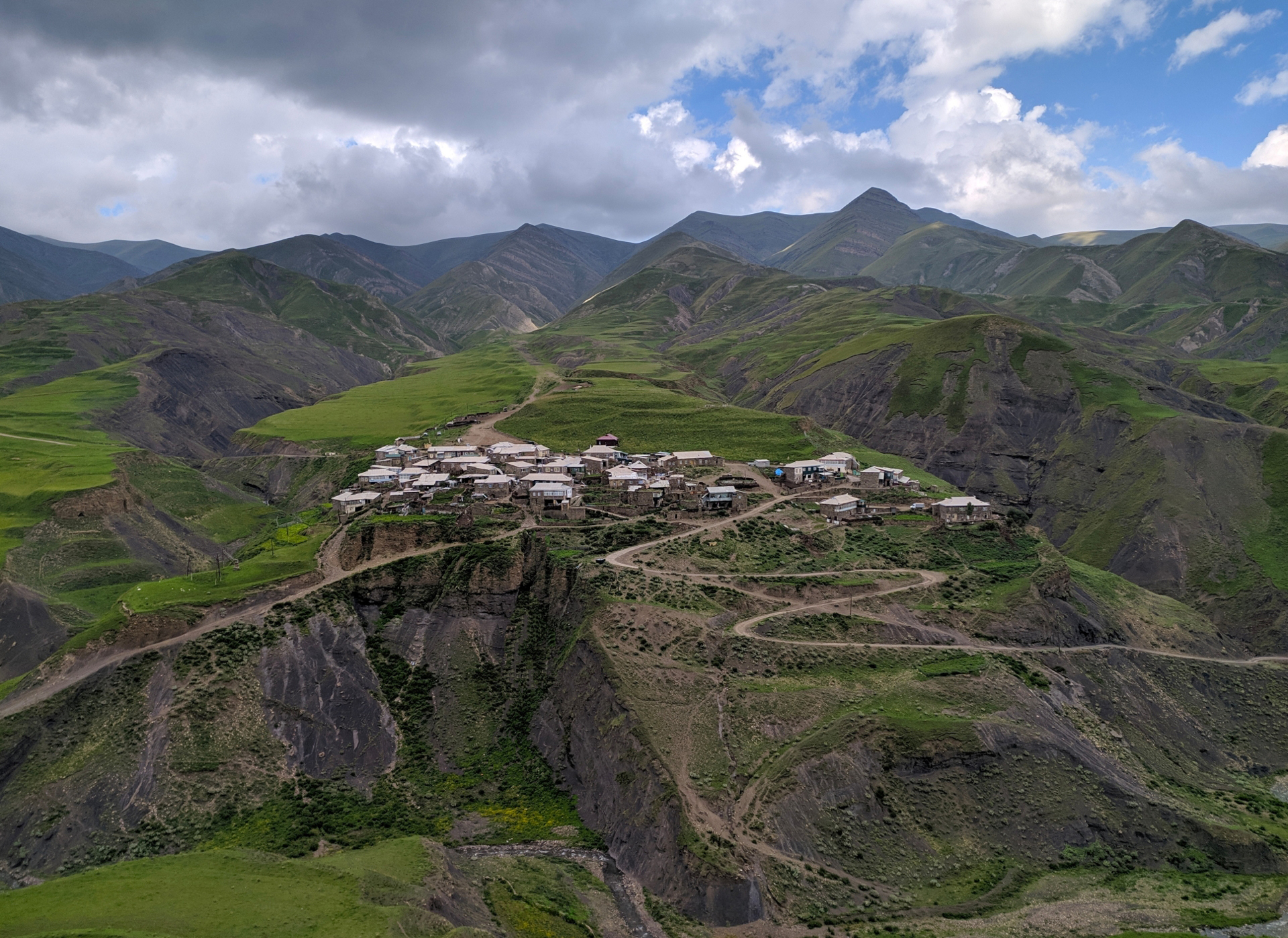
- Aerial view of Arsug

- Location within Republic of Dagestan Location within Russia
- Coordinates: 41°51′N 47°39′E
- Country: Russia
- Region: Republic of Dagestan
- District: Agulsky District
- Time zone: UTC+3:00

Arsug (Russian: Арсуг) is a rural locality (a selo) in Burshagsky Selsoviet, Agulsky District, Republic of Dagestan, Russia. The population was 238 as of 2010.

== Geography ==
Arsug is located on the Koshanapu River, 24 km northeast of Tpig (the district's administrative centre) by road. Khudig is the nearest rural locality.
