= Kokhanovskoye =

Kokhanovskoye Кохановское
- Selo
- Location within Republic of Dagestan Location within Russia
- Coordinates: 43°50′N 46°58′E
- Country: Russia
- Region: Republic of Dagestan
- District: Kizlyarsky District
- Time zone: UTC+3:00

Kokhanovskoye (Russian: Кохановское) is a rural locality (a selo) in Kardonovsky Selsoviet, Kizlyarsky District, Republic of Dagestan, Russia. The population was 1,071 as of 2010. There are 3 streets.

== Geography ==
Kokhanovskoye is located 21 km east of Kizlyar (the district's administrative centre) by road. Nekrasovka and Novonadezhdovka are the nearest rural localities.

== Nationalities ==
Dargins, Avars, Laks, Russians and Azerbaijanis live there.
