= Shalasi =

Shalasi Шаласи
- Selo
- Location within Republic of Dagestan Location within Russia
- Coordinates: 42°21′N 47°55′E
- Country: Russia
- Region: Republic of Dagestan
- District: Dakhadayevsky District
- Time zone: UTC+3:00

Shalasi (Russian: Шаласи) is a rural locality (a selo) in Sutbuksky Selsoviet, Dakhadayevsky District, Republic of Dagestan, Russia. The population was 631 as of 2010. There are 5 streets.

== Geography ==
Shalasi is located 61 km northeast of Urkarakh (the district's administrative centre) by road. Gerga and Kayakent are the nearest rural localities.
