= Zubanchi =

Zubanchi Зубанчи
- Selo
- Location within Republic of Dagestan Location within Russia
- Coordinates: 42°07′N 47°42′E
- Country: Russia
- Region: Republic of Dagestan
- District: Dakhadayevsky District
- Time zone: UTC+3:00

Zubanchi (Russian: Зубанчи) is a rural locality (a selo) in Dakhadayevsky District, Republic of Dagestan, Russia. The population was 1,638 as of 2010. There are 7 streets.

== Geography ==
Zubanchi is located 11 km southeast of Urkarakh (the district's administrative centre) by road. Zilbachi and Trisanchi are the nearest rural localities.
