= Machar, Republic of Dagestan =

Machar Мачар МачӀар
- Selo
- Location within Republic of Dagestan Location within Russia
- Coordinates: 42°12′N 46°20′E
- Country: Russia
- Region: Republic of Dagestan
- District: Tlyaratinsky District
- Time zone: UTC+3:00

Machar (Russian: Мачар; Avar: МачӀар) is a rural locality (a selo) in Chadakolobsky Selsoviet, Tlyaratinsky District, Republic of Dagestan, Russia. Population: 100 (2010 census); 19 (2002 census); 0 (1989 Soviet census).

== Geography ==
Machar is located 16 km north of Tlyarata (the district's administrative centre) by road. Kabasida is the nearest rural locality.
