= Tsanatl =

Tsanatl Цанатль ЦӀаналӀ
- Selo
- Location within Republic of Dagestan Location within Russia
- Coordinates: 42°43′N 46°37′E
- Country: Russia
- Region: Republic of Dagestan
- District: Gumbetovsky District
- Time zone: UTC+3:00

Tsanatl (Russian: Цанатль; Avar: ЦӀаналӀ) is a rural locality (a selo) in Igalinsky Selsoviet, Gumbetovsky District, Republic of Dagestan, Russia. The population was 388 as of 2010. There are 3 streets.

== Geography ==
Tsanatl is located 33 km southeast of Mekhelta (the district's administrative centre) by road, on the right bank of the Enzheruk River. Igali and Nizhny Aradirikh are the nearest rural localities.
