= Bolshekozyrevskoye =

Bolshekozyrevskoye Большекозыревское
- Selo
- Location within Republic of Dagestan Location within Russia
- Coordinates: 43°55′N 46°59′E
- Country: Russia
- Region: Republic of Dagestan
- District: Kizlyarsky District
- Time zone: UTC+3:00

Bolshekozyrevskoye (Russian: Большекозыревское) is a rural locality (a selo) in Chernyayevsky Selsoviet, Kizlyarsky District, Republic of Dagestan, Russia. The population was 141 as of 2010. There is one street.

== Geography ==
Bolshekozyrevskoye is located 28 km (17 mi) northeast of Kizlyar (the district's administrative centre) by road. Chernyayevka and Novovladimirskoye are the nearest rural localities.

== Nationalities ==
Dargins, Avars, Russians and Chechens live there.
