= Chitl =

Chitl Читль ЧӀикь
- Selo
- Location within Republic of Dagestan Location within Russia
- Coordinates: 42°43′N 46°30′E
- Country: Russia
- Region: Republic of Dagestan
- District: Gumbetovsky District
- Time zone: UTC+3:00

Chitl (Russian: Читль; Avar: ЧӀикь) is a rural locality (a selo) in Gumbetovsky District, Republic of Dagestan, Russia. The population was 578 as of 2010. There are 12 streets.

== Geography ==
Chitl is located 36 km south of Mekhelta (the district's administrative centre) by road. Verkhneye Inkho and Nizhneye Inkho are the nearest rural localities.
