= Verkhny Aradirikh =

Verkhny Aradirikh Верхний Арадирих ТӀаса Гьарадерихъ
- Selo
- Location within Republic of Dagestan Location within Russia
- Coordinates: 42°40′N 46°36′E
- Country: Russia
- Region: Republic of Dagestan
- District: Gumbetovsky District
- Time zone: UTC+3:00

Verkhny Aradirikh (Russian: Верхний Арадирих; Avar: ТӀаса Гьарадерихъ) is a rural locality (a selo) in Aradirikhsky Selsoviet, Gumbetovsky District, Republic of Dagestan, Russia. The population was 494 as of 2010. There are 3 streets.

== Geography ==
Verkhny Aradirikh is located 52 km southeast of Mekhelta (the district's administrative centre) by road. Sredny Aradirikh and Khindakh are the nearest rural localities.
