= Shushanovka =

Shushanovka Шушановка Шушануб
- Selo
- Location within Republic of Dagestan Location within Russia
- Coordinates: 43°12′N 46°58′E
- Country: Russia
- Region: Republic of Dagestan
- District: Kizilyurtovsky District
- Time zone: UTC+3:00

Shushanovka (Russian: Шушановка; Avar: Шушануб) is a rural locality (a selo) in Stalsky Selsoviet, Kizilyurtovsky District, Republic of Dagestan, Russia. The population was 1,854 as of 2010. There are 30 streets.

== Nationalities ==
Kumyks and Avars live there.

== Geography ==
Shushanovka is located 55 km northwest of Makhachkala. Stalskoye and Kulzeb are the nearest rural localities.
