= Keger =

Keger Кегер КӀогьориб
- Selo
- Location within Republic of Dagestan Location within Russia
- Coordinates: 42°22′N 47°01′E
- Country: Russia
- Region: Republic of Dagestan
- District: Gunibsky District
- Time zone: UTC+3:00

Keger (Russian: Кегер; Avar: КӀогьориб) is a rural locality (a selo) and the administrative centre of Kegersky Selsoviet, Gunibsky District, Republic of Dagestan, Russia. The population was 594 as of 2010.

== Geography ==
Keger is located 13 km east of Gunib (the district's administrative centre) by road. Silta and Salta are the nearest rural localities.
