= Tilutl =

Tilutl Тилутль Лъилукь
- Selo
- Location within Republic of Dagestan Location within Russia
- Coordinates: 42°06′N 46°20′E
- Country: Russia
- Region: Republic of Dagestan
- District: Tlyaratinsky District
- Time zone: UTC+3:00

Tilutl (Russian: Тилутль; Avar: Лъилукь) is a rural locality (a selo) in Tlyaratinsky Selsoviet, Tlyaratinsky District, Republic of Dagestan, Russia. Population: 347 (2010 census); 286 (2002 census); 252 (1989 Soviet census).

== Geography ==
Tilutl is located 2 km northwest of Tlyarata (the district's administrative centre) by road. Tlyarata is the nearest rural locality.
