= Kishdatl =

Kishdatl Кишдатль Кишдакь
- Selo
- Location within Republic of Dagestan Location within Russia
- Coordinates: 42°18′N 46°20′E
- Country: Russia
- Region: Republic of Dagestan
- District: Tlyaratinsky District
- Time zone: UTC+3:00

Kishdatl (Russian: Кишдатль; Avar: Кишдакь) is a rural locality (a selo) in Khindakhsky Selsoviet, Tlyaratinsky District, Republic of Dagestan, Russia. Population: 21 (2010 census); 15 (2002 census); 80 (1989 Soviet census).

== Geography ==
Kishdatl is located 32 km north of Tlyarata (the district's administrative centre) by road. Tanit is the nearest rural locality.
