= Chankayurt =

Chankayurt Чанкаюрт ЧӀаьнка-Йурт
- Selo
- Location within Republic of Dagestan Location within Russia
- Coordinates: 43°34′N 46°33′E
- Country: Russia
- Region: Republic of Dagestan
- District: Babayurtovsky District
- Time zone: UTC+3:00

Chankayurt (Russian: Чанкаюрт; Chechen: ЧӀаьнка-Йурт, Ҫ̇änka-Yurt) is a rural locality (a selo) in Adil-Yangiyurtovsky Selsoviet, Babayurtovsky District, Republic of Dagestan, Russia. The population was 387 as of 2010. There are 5 streets. Selo was founded in 1857.
