= Khindakh, Khunzakhsky District, Republic of Dagestan =

Khindakh Хиндах
- Selo
- Location within Republic of Dagestan Location within Russia
- Coordinates: 42°39′N 46°34′E
- Country: Russia
- Region: Republic of Dagestan
- District: Khunzakhsky District
- Time zone: UTC+3:00

Khindakh (Avar: Хьиндахъ, Russian: Хиндах) is a rural locality (a selo) and the administrative center of Khindakhsky Selsoviet, Khunzakhsky District, Republic of Dagestan, Russia. Population: 560 (2010 census); 732 (2002 census); 394 (1989 Soviet census). There are 5 streets in this selo.

== Geography ==
It is located 17 km from Khunzakh (the district's administrative centre), 83 km from Makhachkala (capital of Dagestan) and 1,630 km from Moscow. Kolo is the nearest rural locality.

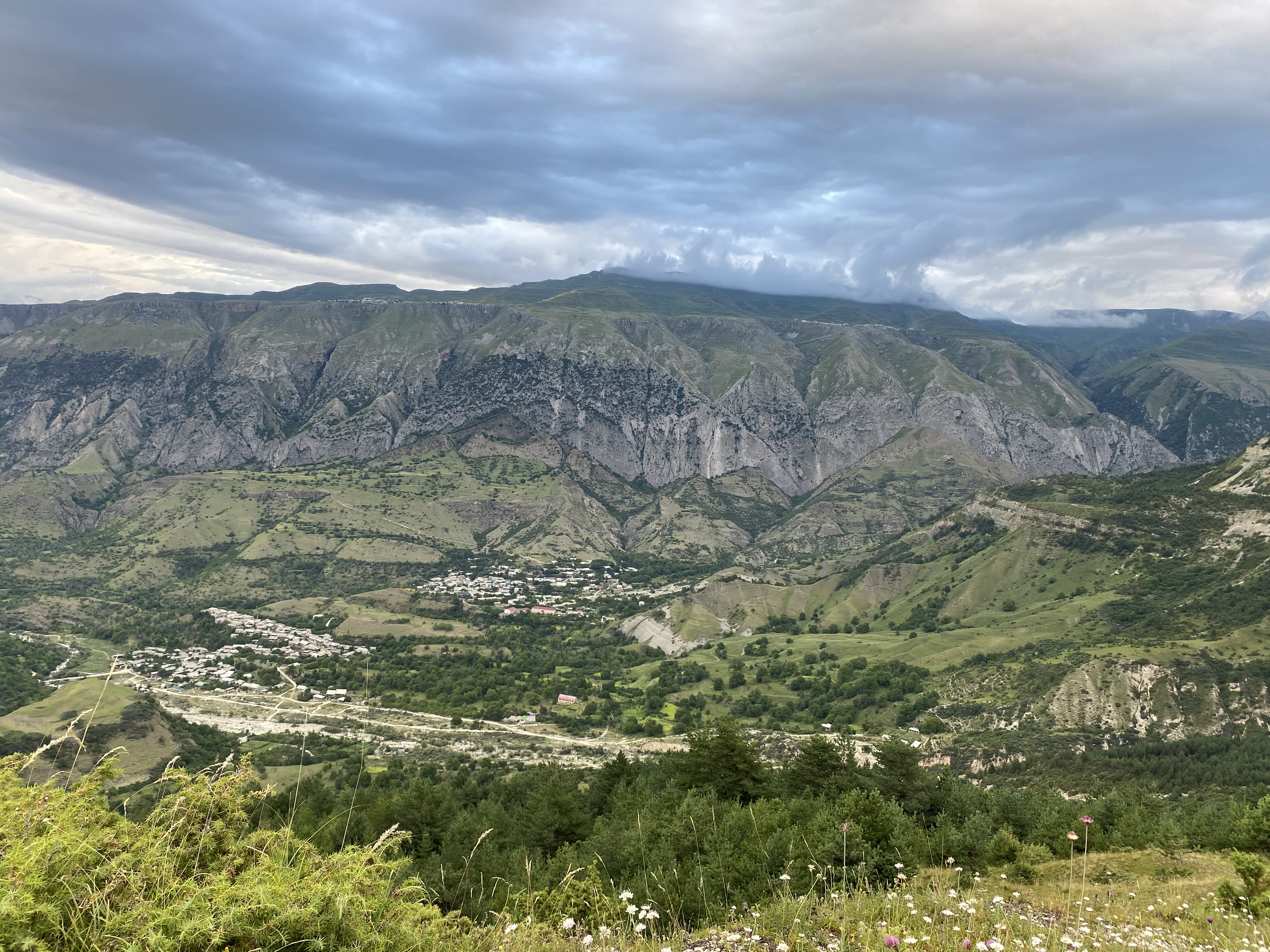
Kolo and Khindakh, Khunzakh District, Dagestan
