= Novokokhanovskoye =

Novokokhanovskoye Новокохановское
- Selo
- Location within Republic of Dagestan Location within Russia
- Coordinates: 43°51′N 46°38′E
- Country: Russia
- Region: Republic of Dagestan
- District: Kizlyarsky District
- Time zone: UTC+3:00

Novokokhanovskoye (Russian: Новокохановское) is a rural locality (a selo) and the administrative centre of Novokokhanovsky Selsoviet, Kizlyarsky District, Republic of Dagestan, Russia. The population was 845 as of 2010. There are 6 streets.

== Geography ==
Novokokhanovskoye is located 9 km northwest of Kizlyar (the district's administrative centre) by road. Krasny Voskhod, Krasnooktyabrskoye and Novomonastyrskoye are the nearest rural localities.

== Nationalities ==
Dargins, Avars, Russians, Lezgins and Laks live there.
