= Unty =

Unty Унты ГӀунтӀиб
- Selo
- Location within Republic of Dagestan Location within Russia
- Coordinates: 42°18′N 46°56′E
- Country: Russia
- Region: Republic of Dagestan
- District: Gunibsky District
- Time zone: UTC+3:00

Unty (Russian: Унты; Avar: ГӀунтӀиб) is a rural locality (a selo) in Shulaninsky Selsoviet, Gunibsky District, Republic of Dagestan, Russia. The population was 383 as of 2010.

== Geography ==
Unty is located 21 km south of Gunib (the district's administrative centre) by road. Shulani and Batsada are the nearest rural localities.

== Nationalities ==
Avars live there.
