= Burshag =

Burshag Буршаг
- Selo
- Location within Republic of Dagestan Location within Russia
- Coordinates: 41°53′N 47°38′E
- Country: Russia
- Region: Republic of Dagestan
- District: Agulsky District
- Time zone: UTC+3:00

Burshag (Russian: Буршаг) is a rural locality (a selo) and the administrative centre of Burshagsky Selsoviet, Agulsky District, Republic of Dagestan, Russia. The population was 653 as of 2010.

== Geography ==
Burshag is located on the Koshanapu River, 29 km northeast of Tpig (the district's administrative centre) by road. Khudig is the nearest rural locality.
