= Khazar, Republic of Dagestan =

Khazar Хазар Хәзәр
- Selo
- Location within Republic of Dagestan Location within Russia
- Coordinates: 41°59′N 48°20′E
- Country: Russia
- Region: Republic of Dagestan
- District: Derbentsky District
- Time zone: UTC+3:00

Khazar (Russian: Хазар; Azerbaijani: Хәзәр, Xəzər) is a rural locality (a selo) and the administrative centre of Khazarsky Selsoviet, Derbentsky District, Republic of Dagestan, Russia. The population was 4,809 as of 2010. There are 34 streets.

== Geography ==
Khazar is located 10 km south of Derbent (the district's administrative centre) by road. Nizhny Dzhalgan and Arablinskoye are the nearest rural localities.

== Nationalities ==
Azerbaijanis, Aghuls, Lezgins, Tabasarans, Rutuls, Dargins and Russians live there.
