= Kudutl =

Kudutl Кудутль Къудукь
- Selo
- Location within Republic of Dagestan Location within Russia
- Coordinates: 42°34′N 47°01′E
- Country: Russia
- Region: Republic of Dagestan
- District: Gergebilsky District
- Time zone: UTC+3:00

Kudutl (Russian: Кудутль; Avar: Къудукь) is a rural locality (a selo) in Gergebilsky District, Republic of Dagestan, Russia. The population was 541 as of 2010. There are 11 streets.

== Geography ==
Kurmi is located 22 km northwest of Gergebil (the district's administrative centre) by road. Maydanskoye and Arakani are the nearest rural localities.
