= Khoroda =

Khoroda Хорода
- Selo
- Location within Republic of Dagestan Location within Russia
- Coordinates: 42°15′N 46°25′E
- Country: Russia
- Region: Republic of Dagestan
- District: Tlyaratinsky District
- Time zone: UTC+3:00

Khoroda (Russian: Хорода) is a rural locality (a selo) and the administrative center of Kosobsky Selsoviet, Tlyaratinsky District, Republic of Dagestan, Russia. Population: 279 (2010 census); 190 (2002 census); 84 (1989 Soviet census).

== Geography ==
Khoroda is located 30 km north of Tlyarata (the district's administrative centre) by road. Magitl and Kosob are the nearest rural localities.
