= Tasuta =

Tasuta Тасута ТӀасутӀа
- Selo
- Location within Republic of Dagestan Location within Russia
- Coordinates: 42°42′N 46°13′E
- Country: Russia
- Region: Republic of Dagestan
- District: Botlikhsky District
- Time zone: UTC+3:00

Tasuta (Russian: Тасута; Avar: ТӀасутӀа) is a rural locality (a selo) in Botlikshky Selsoviet, Botlikhsky District, Republic of Dagestan, Russia. The population was 369 as of 2010. There are 4 streets.

== Geography ==
Tasuta is located 20 km north of Botlikh (the district's administrative centre) by road, on the right bank of the Chankovskaya River. Chanko is the nearest rural locality.
