= Edige =

Edige Эдиге
- Selo
- Location within Republic of Dagestan Location within Russia
- Coordinates: 44°04′N 46°21′E
- Country: Russia
- Region: Republic of Dagestan
- District: Nogaysky District
- Time zone: UTC+3:00

Edige (Russian: Эдиге) is a rural locality (a selo) in Nogaysky District, Republic of Dagestan, Russia. Population: 392 (2021 census); 506 (2002 census); 486 (1989 Soviet census). There are 7 streets.

== Geography ==
Edige is located 48 km southeast of Terekli-Mekteb (the district's administrative centre) by road. Tarumovka and Komsomolsky are the nearest rural localities.

== Nationalities ==
Nogais live there.
