= Vavilovo, Republic of Dagestan =

Vavilovo Вавилово
- Selo
- Location within Republic of Dagestan Location within Russia
- Coordinates: 41°58′N 48°19′E
- Country: Russia
- Region: Republic of Dagestan
- District: Derbentsky District
- Time zone: UTC+3:00

Vavilovo (Russian: Вавилово) is a rural locality (a selo) in Khazarsky Selsoviet, Derbentsky District, Republic of Dagestan, Russia. The population was 236 as of 2010. There are 4 streets.

== Geography ==
Vavilovo is located 10 km south of Derbent (the district's administrative centre) by road. Nizhny Dzhiglan and Khazar are the nearest rural localities.

== Nationalities ==
Tabasarans, Lezgins and Azerbaijanis live there.
