= Mulla-Ali, Republic of Dagestan =

Mulla-Ali Мулла-Али
- Selo
- Location within Republic of Dagestan Location within Russia
- Coordinates: 43°52′N 46°53′E
- Country: Russia
- Region: Republic of Dagestan
- District: Kizlyarsky District
- Time zone: UTC+3:00

Mulla-Ali (Russian: Мулла-Али) is a rural locality (a selo) in Bolshezadoyevsky Selsoviet, Kizlyarsky District, Republic of Dagestan, Russia. The population was 64 as of 2010. There are 2 streets.

== Geography ==
Mulla-Ali is located 15 km northeast of Kizlyar (the district's administrative centre) by road, on the left bank of the Stary Terk River. Malaya Zadovka and Novogladovka are the nearest rural localities.

== Nationalities ==
Avars live there.
