= Nekrasovka, Republic of Dagestan =

Nekrasovka Некрасовка
- Selo
- Location within Republic of Dagestan Location within Russia
- Coordinates: 43°49′N 46°57′E
- Country: Russia
- Region: Republic of Dagestan
- District: Kizlyarsky District
- Time zone: UTC+3:00

Nekrasovka (Russian: Некрасовка) is a rural locality (a selo) in Kardonovsky Selsoviet, Kizlyarsky District, Republic of Dagestan, Russia. The population was 686 as of 2010. There are 2 streets.

== Geography ==
Nekrasovka is located 20 km east of Kizlyar (the district's administrative centre) by road. Kokhanovskoye and Novonadezhdovka are the nearest rural localities.

== Nationalities ==
Dargins, Russians, Avars, Laks and Lezgins live there.
