= Barnab =

Barnab Барнаб
- Selo
- Location within Republic of Dagestan Location within Russia
- Coordinates: 42°04′N 46°22′E
- Country: Russia
- Region: Republic of Dagestan
- District: Tlyaratinsky District
- Time zone: UTC+3:00

Barnab (Russian: Барнаб) is a rural locality (a selo) in Tlyaratinsky Selsoviet, Tlyaratinsky District, Republic of Dagestan, Russia. Population: 400 (2010 census); 348 (2002 census); 268 (1989 Soviet census).

== Geography ==
Barnab is located 4 km southeast of Tlyarata (the district's administrative centre) by road. Cherel is the nearest rural locality.
