= Genekolob =

Genekolob Генеколоб Гъенеколоб
- Selo
- Location within Republic of Dagestan Location within Russia
- Coordinates: 41°55′N 46°36′E
- Country: Russia
- Region: Republic of Dagestan
- District: Tlyaratinsky District
- Time zone: UTC+3:00

Genekolob (Russian: Генеколоб; Avar: Гъенеколоб) is a rural locality (a selo) in Kamilukhsky Selsoviet, Tlyaratinsky District, Republic of Dagestan, Russia. Population: 753 (2010 census); 793 (2002 census); 430 (1989 Soviet census). There are 3 streets.

== Geography ==
Genekolob is located 42 km southeast of Tlyarata (the district's administrative centre) by road. Kamilukh is the nearest rural locality.
