= Nakazukh =

Nakazukh Наказух НакӀкӀазухъ
- Selo
- Location within Republic of Dagestan Location within Russia
- Coordinates: 42°15′N 46°54′E
- Country: Russia
- Region: Republic of Dagestan
- District: Gunibsky District
- Time zone: UTC+3:00

Nakazukh (Russian: Наказух; Avar: НакӀкӀазухъ) is a rural locality (a selo) in Sogratlinsky Selsoviet, Gunibsky District, Republic of Dagestan, Russia. The population was 136 as of 2010.

== Geography ==
Nakazukh is located 31 km southwest of Gunib (the district's administrative centre) by road, on the Batikh River. Batsada and Shulani are the nearest rural localities.
