= Kokrek =

Coordinates: 44°14′14″N 46°43′56″E

Kokrek (Russian: Кокрек) is a rural locality (a selo) in the Khasavyurtovsky District in the Republic of Dagestan, Russia. Population: 4,807 (2010 census); 3,905 (2002 census);
