= Vyshe-Talovka =

Vyshe-Talovka Выше-Таловка
- Selo
- Location within Republic of Dagestan Location within Russia
- Coordinates: 44°02′N 46°43′E
- Country: Russia
- Region: Republic of Dagestan
- District: Kizlyarsky District
- Time zone: UTC+3:00

Vyshe-Talovka (Russian: Выше-Таловка) is a rural locality (a selo) in Maloareshevsky Selsoviet, Kizlyarsky District, Republic of Dagestan, Russia. The population was 784 as of 2010.

== Geography ==
Vyshe-Talovka is located 31 km north of Kizlyar (the district's administrative centre) by road, with Kerlikent and Malaya Areshevka being the nearest rural localities.

== Nationalities ==
The region is inhabited by Avars, Dargins, and Russians
