= Vyshetalovsky =

Vyshetalovsky Вышеталовский
- Selo
- Location within Republic of Dagestan Location within Russia
- Coordinates: 44°02′N 46°43′E
- Country: Russia
- Region: Republic of Dagestan
- District: Tarumovsky District
- Time zone: UTC+3:00

Vyshetalovsky (Russian: Вышеталовский) is a rural locality (a selo) in Ullubiyevsky Selsoviet, Tarumovsky District, Republic of Dagestan, Russia. Population: 320 (2010 census); 276 (2002 census); 365 (1989 Soviet census). There are 3 streets.

== Geography ==
Vyshetalovsky is located 26 km southeast of Tarumovka (the district's administrative centre) by road. Vyshe-Talovka is the nearest rural locality.
