= Ulgeb =

Ulgeb Ульгеб ГӀулгьеб
- Selo
- Location within Republic of Dagestan Location within Russia
- Coordinates: 41°57′N 46°31′E
- Country: Russia
- Region: Republic of Dagestan
- District: Tlyaratinsky District
- Time zone: UTC+3:00

Ulgeb (Russian: Ульгеб; Avar: ГӀулгьеб) is a rural locality (a selo) in Gerelsky Selsoviet, Tlyaratinsky District, Republic of Dagestan, Russia. Population: 209 (2010 census); 89 (2002 census); 111 (1989 Soviet census).

== Geography ==
Ulgeb is located 34 km southeast of Tlyarata (the district's administrative centre) by road. Gortnob is the nearest rural locality.
