= Kollektivizator =

Kollektivizator Коллективизатор
- Selo
- Location within Republic of Dagestan Location within Russia
- Coordinates: 43°57′N 47°23′E
- Country: Russia
- Region: Republic of Dagestan
- District: Kizlyarsky District
- Time zone: UTC+3:00

Kollektivizator (Russian: Коллективизатор) is a rural locality (a selo) in Kraynovsky Selsoviet, Kizlyarsky District, Republic of Dagestan, Russia. The population was 364 as of 2010. There are 3 streets.

== Geography ==
Kollektivizator is located 64 km northeast of Kizlyar (the district's administrative centre) by road. Kraynovka and Imeni Magomeda Gadzhiyeva are the nearest rural localities.

== Nationalities ==
Avars, Russians and Dargins live there.
