= Gelinbatan =

Gelinbatan Гелинбатан
- Selo
- Location within Republic of Dagestan Location within Russia
- Coordinates: 41°56′N 48°09′E
- Country: Russia
- Region: Republic of Dagestan
- District: Tabasaransky District
- Time zone: UTC+3:00

Gelinbatan (Russian: Гелинбатан) is a rural locality (a selo) in Maraginsky Selsoviet, Tabasaransky District, Republic of Dagestan, Russia. The population was 668 as of 2010. There are 3 streets.

== Geography ==
Gelinbatan is located 26 km east of Khuchni (the district's administrative centre) by road. Maraga is the nearest rural locality.
