= Sar-Sar =

Sar-Sar Сар-Сар
- Selo
- Location within Republic of Dagestan Location within Russia
- Coordinates: 43°58′N 47°04′E
- Country: Russia
- Region: Republic of Dagestan
- District: Kizlyarsky District
- Time zone: UTC+3:00

Sar-Sar (Russian: Сар-Сар) is a rural locality (a selo) in Chernyayevsky Selsoviet, Kizlyarsky District, Republic of Dagestan, Russia. The population was 538 as of 2010. There are 4 streets.

== Geography ==
Sar-Sar is located 39 km northeast of Kizlyar (the district's administrative centre) by road. Chernyayevka and Gruzinsky are the nearest rural localities.

== Nationalities ==
Lezgins live there.
