= Rugudzha =

Rugudzha Ругуджа Ругъжаб
- Selo
- Location within Republic of Dagestan Location within Russia
- Coordinates: 42°21′N 46°55′E
- Country: Russia
- Region: Republic of Dagestan
- District: Gunibsky District
- Time zone: UTC+3:00

Rugudzha (Russian: Ругуджа; Avar: Ругъжаб) is a rural locality (a selo) and the administrative centre of Rugudzhinsky Selsoviet, Gunibsky District, Republic of Dagestan, Russia. The population was 1,641 as of 2010.

== Geography ==
Rugudzha is located 12 km southwest of Gunib (the district's administrative centre) by road. Khopor and Khutni are the nearest rural localities.
