= Boragangechuv =

Boragangechuv Борагангечув БоргӀан-Гечу
- Selo
- Location within Republic of Dagestan Location within Russia
- Coordinates: 43°18′N 46°26′E
- Country: Russia
- Region: Republic of Dagestan
- District: Khasavyurtovsky District
- Time zone: UTC+3:00

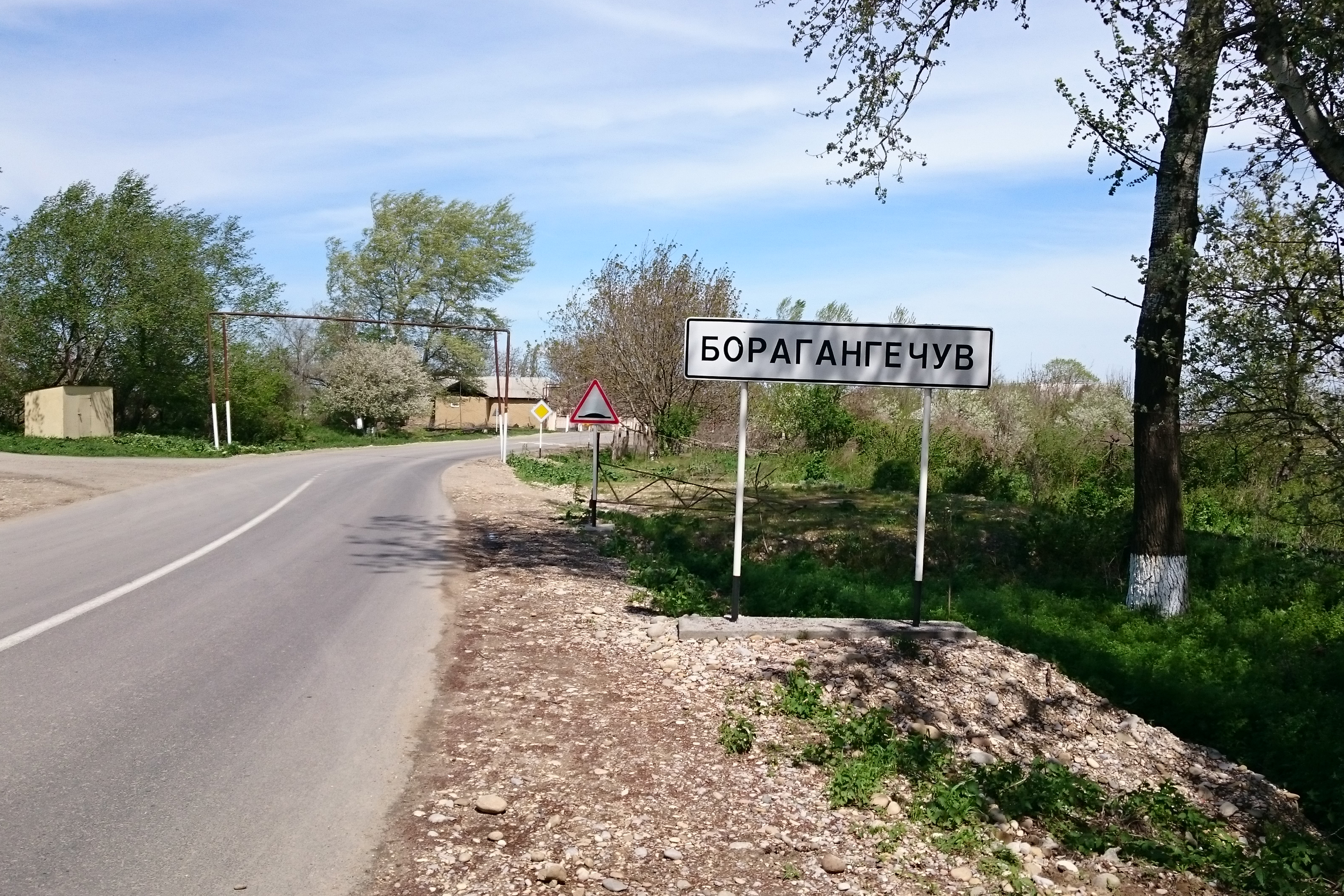

Boragangechuv (Russian: Борагангечув; Chechen: БоргӀан-Гечу) is a rural locality (a selo) in Khasavyurtovsky District, Republic of Dagestan, Russia. 2,027 (2021 census); 1,562 (2002 census); 1,237 (1989 Soviet census). There are 28 streets.

== Geography ==
Boragangechuv is located 24 km northwest of Khasavyurt (the district's administrative centre) by road. Khamavyurt is the nearest rural locality.
