= Kudiyabroso =

Kudiyabroso Кудиябросо Кӏудиябросо
- Selo
- Location within Republic of Dagestan Location within Russia
- Coordinates: 42°32′N 46°22′E
- Country: Russia
- Region: Republic of Dagestan
- District: Akhvakhsky District
- Time zone: UTC+3:00

Kudiyabroso (Russian: Кудиябросо; Avar: Кӏудиябросо) is a rural locality (a selo) in Akhvakhsky District, Republic of Dagestan, Russia. The population was 2,233 as of 2010.

== Geography ==
Kudiyabroso is located on the Izanitlar River, 11 km southeast of Karata (the district's administrative centre) by road. Izano is the nearest rural locality.
