= Garakolob =

Garakolob Гараколоб Гъараколоб
- Selo
- Location within Republic of Dagestan Location within Russia
- Coordinates: 42°02′N 46°27′E
- Country: Russia
- Region: Republic of Dagestan
- District: Tlyaratinsky District
- Time zone: UTC+3:00

Garakolob (Russian: Гараколоб; Avar: Гъараколоб) is a rural locality (a selo) in Saniortinsky Selsoviet, Tlyaratinsky District, Republic of Dagestan, Russia. Population: 249 (2010 census); 234 (2002 census); 211 (1989 Soviet census).

== Geography ==
Garakolob is located 16 km southeast of Tlyarata (the district's administrative centre) by road. Nitilsukh is the nearest rural locality.
