= Tutlar =

Tutlar Тутлар Дитташка
- Selo
- Location within Republic of Dagestan Location within Russia
- Coordinates: 43°27′N 46°41′E
- Country: Russia
- Region: Republic of Dagestan
- District: Khasavyurtovsky District
- Time zone: UTC+3:00

Tutlar (Russian: Тутлар; Chechen: Дитташка, Dittaşka) is a rural locality (a selo) in Adilotarsky Selsoviet, Khasavyurtovsky District, Republic of Dagestan, Russia. Population: 505 (2010 census); 451 (2002 census); 311 (1989 Soviet census). There are 14 streets.

== Geography ==
Tutlar is located 39 km north of Khasavyurt (the district's administrative centre) by road. Adilotar is the nearest rural locality.
