= Shiya =

Shiya Шия
- Selo
- Location within Republic of Dagestan Location within Russia
- Coordinates: 42°15′N 45°48′E
- Country: Russia
- Region: Republic of Dagestan
- District: Tsuntinsky District
- Time zone: UTC+3:00

Shiya (Russian: Шия) is a rural locality (a selo) in Tsuntinsky District, Republic of Dagestan, Russia. Population: 74 (2021 census); 57 (2002 census); 40 (1989 Soviet census). There is 1 street in this selo.

== Geography ==
Selo is located 160 km from Makhachkala (capital of Dagestan) and 1,644 km from Moscow. Udok is the nearest rural locality.
