= Novye Vikri =

Novye Vikri Новые Викри
- Selo
- Location within Republic of Dagestan Location within Russia
- Coordinates: 42°17′N 47°59′E
- Country: Russia
- Region: Republic of Dagestan
- District: Kayakentsky District
- Time zone: UTC+3:00

Novye Vikri (Russian: Новые Викри) is a rural locality (a selo) and the administrative centre of Novovikrinsky Selsoviet, Kayakentsky District, Republic of Dagestan, Russia. The population was 3,338 as of 2010. There are 45 streets.

== Geography ==
Novye Vikri is located 15 km south of Novokayakent (the district's administrative centre) by road. Krasnopartizansk and Gerga are the nearest rural localities.

== Nationalities ==
Dargins live there.
