= 2nd otdelenie sovkhoza =

2nd otdelenie sovkhoza 2-е отделение совхоза
- Selo
- Location within Republic of Dagestan Location within Russia
- Coordinates: 41.684444°N 48.240833°E
- Country: Russia
- Region: Dagestan
- District: Suleyman-Stalsky District
- Time zone: UTC+03:00

2nd otdelenie sovkhoza (Russian: 2-е отделение совхоза) is a rural locality (a selo) in Gereykhanovsky Selsovet of Suleyman-Stalsky District, Russia. The population was 1265 as of 2010.

== Geography ==
The village is located on the left bank of the Chiragchay River, 6 km south from Kasumkent.

== Streets ==
- 3 Internatsionala
- A. Israfilova
- Agasieva
- Belinskogo
- Buynakskogo
- V. Emirova
- Gornaya
- Dahadaeva
- E. Emina
- K. Marksa
- Lenina
- M. Gorkogo
- Makarskaya
- Mira
- Naberezhnaya
- Proletarskaya
- Pushkina
- S. Stalskogo
- Salikhova per.
- Salikhova
