= Kerimkhanar =

Kerimkhanar Керимханар
- Selo
- Location within Republic of Dagestan Location within Russia
- Coordinates: 41°23′N 47°54′E
- Country: Russia
- Region: Republic of Dagestan
- District: Dokuzparinsky District
- Time zone: UTC+3:00

Kerimkhanar (Russian: Керимханар) is a rural locality (a selo) in Kilersky Selsoviet, Dokuzparinsky District, Republic of Dagestan, Russia. The population was 103 as of 2010.

== Geography ==
Kerimkhanar is located 5 km south of Usukhchay (the district's administrative centre) by road. Kiler and Gandurar are the nearest rural localities.
