= Matseyevka =

Matseyevka Мацеевка
- Selo
- Location within Republic of Dagestan Location within Russia
- Coordinates: 43°16′N 46°58′E
- Country: Russia
- Region: Republic of Dagestan
- District: Kizilyurtovsky District
- Time zone: UTC+3:00

Matseyevka (Russian: Мацеевка) is a rural locality (a selo) in Nechayevsky Selsoviet, Kizilyurtovsky District, Republic of Dagestan, Russia. The population was 460 as of 2010. There are 20 streets.

== Geography ==
Matseyevka is located 15 km northwest of Kizilyurt (the district's administrative centre) by road. Akhtini and Nechayevka are the nearest rural localities.

== Nationalities ==
Avars live there.
