= Tokh =

Tokh Тох
- Selo
- Location within Republic of Dagestan Location within Russia
- Coordinates: 42°13′N 46°17′E
- Country: Russia
- Region: Republic of Dagestan
- District: Tlyaratinsky District
- Time zone: UTC+3:00

Tokh (Russian: Тох) is a rural locality (a selo) in Shidibsky Selsoviet, Tlyaratinsky District, Republic of Dagestan, Russia. Population: 135 (2010 census); 68 (2002 census); 143 (1989 Soviet census).

== Geography ==
Tokh is located 23 km northwest of Tlyarata (the district's administrative centre) by road. Bochokh is the nearest rural locality.
