= Danukh =

Danukh Данух
- Selo
- Location within Republic of Dagestan Location within Russia
- Coordinates: 42°50′N 46°37′E
- Country: Russia
- Region: Republic of Dagestan
- District: Gumbetovsky District
- Time zone: UTC+3:00

Danukh (Russian: Данух) is a rural locality (a selo) in Gumbetovsky District, Republic of Dagestan, Russia. The population was 812 as of 2010. There are 6 streets.

== Geography ==
Danukh is located 25 km northeast of Mekhelta (the district's administrative centre) by road. Gadari and Artlukh are the nearest rural localities.
