= Tlobzoda =

Tlobzoda Тлобзода Кьобзода
- Selo
- Location within Republic of Dagestan Location within Russia
- Coordinates: 42°10′N 46°22′E
- Country: Russia
- Region: Republic of Dagestan
- District: Tlyaratinsky District
- Time zone: UTC+3:00

Tlobzoda (Russian: Тлобзода; Avar: Кьобзода) is a rural locality (a selo) in Khidibsky Selsoviet, Tlyaratinsky District, Republic of Dagestan, Russia. Population: 76 (2010 census); 101 (2002 census); 71 (1989 Soviet census).

== Geography ==
Tlobzoda is located 18 km north of Tlyarata (the district's administrative centre) by road. Khidib and Anada are the nearest rural localities.
