= Imanaliroso =

Imanaliroso Иманалиросо ИмангӀалиросу
- Selo
- Location within Republic of Dagestan Location within Russia
- Coordinates: 42°54′N 46°45′E
- Country: Russia
- Region: Republic of Dagestan
- District: Kazbekovsky District
- Time zone: UTC+3:00

Imanaliroso (Russian: Иманалиросо; Avar: ИмангӀалиросу) is a rural locality (a selo) in Artlukhsky Selsoviet, Kazbekovsky District, Republic of Dagestan, Russia. The population was 310 as of 2010.

== Nationalities ==
Avars live there.

== Geography ==
Imanaliroso is located 32 km southeast of Dylym (the district's administrative centre) by road. Gertma and Guni are the nearest rural localities.
