= Narysh =

Narysh Нарыш Нариш
- Selo
- Location within Republic of Dagestan Location within Russia
- Coordinates: 43°31′N 46°41′E
- Country: Russia
- Region: Republic of Dagestan
- District: Gumbetovsky District
- Time zone: UTC+3:00

Narysh (Russian: Нарыш; Avar: Нариш) is a rural locality (a selo) in Mekheltinsky Selsoviet, Gumbetovsky District, Republic of Dagestan, Russia. The population was 451 as of 2010.

== Geography ==
Narysh is located 128 km north of Mekhelta (the district's administrative centre) by road. Germenchik and Pervomayskoye are the nearest rural localities.
