= Moksokh =

Moksokh Моксох Мокъсохъ
- Selo
- Location within Republic of Dagestan Location within Russia
- Coordinates: 42°39′N 46°48′E
- Country: Russia
- Region: Republic of Dagestan
- District: Untsukulsky District
- Time zone: UTC+3:00

Moksokh (Russian: Моксох; Avar: Мокъсохъ) is a rural locality (a selo) in Balakhansky Selsoviet, Untsukulsky District, Republic of Dagestan, Russia. Population: 219 (2010 census); 146 (2002 census); 97 (1989 Soviet census).

== Geography ==
Moksokh is located 26 km southwest of Shamilkala (the district's administrative centre) by road. Kharachi is the nearest rural locality.
