= Anada =

Anada Анада АнгӀада
- Selo
- Location within Republic of Dagestan Location within Russia
- Coordinates: 42°10′N 46°22′E
- Country: Russia
- Region: Republic of Dagestan
- District: Tlyaratinsky District
- Time zone: UTC+3:00

Anada (Russian: Анада; Avar: АнгӀада) is a rural locality (a selo) in Khidibsky Selsoviet, Tlyaratinsky District, Republic of Dagestan, Russia. Population: 49 (2010 census); 67 (2002 census); 29 (1989 Soviet census).

== Geography ==
Anada is located 19 km north of Tlyarata (the district's administrative centre) by road. Tlobzoda is the nearest rural locality.
