= Zhazhada =

Zhazhada Жажада
- Selo
- Location within Republic of Dagestan Location within Russia
- Coordinates: 42°11′N 46°25′E
- Country: Russia
- Region: Republic of Dagestan
- District: Tlyaratinsky District
- Time zone: UTC+3:00

Zhazhada (Russian: Жажада) is a rural locality (a selo) in Nachadinsky Selsoviet, Tlyaratinsky District, Republic of Dagestan, Russia. Population: 200 (2010 census); 139 (2002 census); 138 (1989 Soviet census).

== Geography ==
Zhazhada is located 28 km northeast of Tlyarata (the district's administrative centre) by road. Khotlob is the nearest rural locality.
