= Khutrakh =

Khutrakh Хутрах
- Selo
- Location within Republic of Dagestan Location within Russia
- Coordinates: 42°13′N 45°47′E
- Country: Russia
- Region: Republic of Dagestan
- District: Tsuntinsky District
- Time zone: UTC+3:00

Khutrakh (Russian: Хутрах) is a rural locality (a selo) in Tsuntinsky District, Republic of Dagestan, Russia. Population: 546 (2021 census); 569 (2002 census); 548 (1989 Soviet census). There are 4 streets in this selo.

== Geography ==
Selo is located 239 km from Makhachkala (capital of Dagestan) and 2,056 km from Moscow.
