= Susakent =

Susakent Сусакент
- Selo
- Location within Republic of Dagestan Location within Russia
- Coordinates: 42°21′N 47°21′E
- Country: Russia
- Region: Republic of Dagestan
- District: Levashinsky District
- Time zone: UTC+3:00

Susakent (Russian: Сусакент) is a rural locality (a selo) in Ebdalayansky Selsoviet, Levashinsky District, Republic of Dagestan, Russia. The population was 475 as of 2010. There are 6 streets.

== Geography ==
Susakent is located 10 km southeast of Levashi (the district's administrative centre) by road. Tagirkent and Ebdalaya are the nearest rural localities.

== Nationalities ==
Dargins live there.
