= Inchkhe =

Inchkhe Инчхе
- Selo
- Location within Republic of Dagestan Location within Russia
- Coordinates: 42°28′N 47°56′E
- Country: Russia
- Region: Republic of Dagestan
- District: Kayakentsky District
- Time zone: UTC+3:00

Inchkhe (Russian: Инчхе) is a rural locality (a selo) in Novokayakentsky Selsoviet, Kayakentsky District, Republic of Dagestan, Russia. The population was 195 as of 2010. There are 2 streets.

== Geography ==
Inchkhe is located 19 km north of Novokayakent (the district's administrative centre) by road. Pervomayskoye and Karanayaul are the nearest rural localities.

== Nationalities ==
Dargins, Kumyks and Azerbaijanis live there.
