= Khidib =

Khidib Хидиб
- Selo
- Location within Republic of Dagestan Location within Russia
- Coordinates: 42°10′N 46°21′E
- Country: Russia
- Region: Republic of Dagestan
- District: Tlyaratinsky District
- Time zone: UTC+3:00

Khidib (Russian: Хидиб) is a rural locality (a selo) and the administrative center of Khidibsky Selsoviet, Tlyaratinsky District, Republic of Dagestan, Russia. Population: 45 (2010 census); 41 (2002 census); 49 (1989 Soviet census).

== Geography ==
Khidib is located 18 km north of Tlyarata (the district's administrative centre) by road. Tlobzoda is the nearest rural locality.
