= Angida =

Angida Ангида
- Selo
- Location within Republic of Dagestan Location within Russia
- Coordinates: 42°25′N 46°11′E
- Country: Russia
- Region: Republic of Dagestan
- District: Tsumadinsky District
- Time zone: UTC+3:00

Angida (Russian: Ангида) is a rural locality (a selo) in Tsumadinsky District, Republic of Dagestan, Russia. Population: 23 (2021 census); 12 (2002 census); 27 (1989 Soviet census). There are 2 streets in this selo.

== Geography ==
Selo is located 13 km from Agvali (the district's administrative centre), 123 km from Makhachkala (capital of Dagestan) and 1,640 km from Moscow. Gunduchi is the nearest rural locality.
