= Suleybakent =

Suleybakent Сулейбакент
- Selo
- Location within Republic of Dagestan Location within Russia
- Coordinates: 42°21′N 47°22′E
- Country: Russia
- Region: Republic of Dagestan
- District: Levashinsky District
- Time zone: UTC+3:00

Suleybakent (Russian: Сулейбакент) is a rural locality (a selo) in Karlabkinsky Selsoviet, Levashinsky District, Republic of Dagestan, Russia. The population was 1,257 as of 2010. There are 11 streets.

== Geography ==
Suleybakent is located 12 km southeast of Levashi (the district's administrative centre) by road. Tagirkent and Tagzirkent are the nearest rural localities.

== Nationalities ==
Dargins live there.
