= Tad-Magitl =

Tad-Magitl Тад-Магитль Тӏадмагъилъ
- Selo
- Location within Republic of Dagestan Location within Russia
- Coordinates: 42°33′N 46°20′E
- Country: Russia
- Region: Republic of Dagestan
- District: Akhvakhsky District
- Time zone: UTC+3:00

Tad-Magitl (Russian: Тад-Магитль; Avar: Тӏадмагъилъ) is a selo (rural village) and the administrative centre of Tad-Magitlinsky Selsoviet, Akhvakhsky District, Republic of Dagestan, Russia. The population was 1,212 in 2010. There are three streets.

== Geography ==
Tad-Magitl is located on the Lologonitltlar River, one kilometre west of Karata (the district's administrative centre) by road.
