= Khindakh, Tlyaratinsky District, Republic of Dagestan =

Khindakh Хиндах Хьиндахъ
- Selo
- Location within Republic of Dagestan Location within Russia
- Coordinates: 42°17′N 46°23′E
- Country: Russia
- Region: Republic of Dagestan
- District: Tlyaratinsky District
- Time zone: UTC+3:00

Khindakh (Russian: Хиндах; Avar: Хьиндахъ) is a rural locality (a selo) and the administrative center of Khindakhsky Selsoviet, Tlyaratinsky District, Republic of Dagestan, Russia. Population: 164 (2010 census); 328 (2002 census); 116 (1989 Soviet census).

== Geography ==
Khindakh is located 32 km north of Tlyarata (the district's administrative centre) by road. Albaniya is the nearest rural locality.
