= Luguvalu =

Luguvalu Лугувалу
- Selo
- Location within Republic of Dagestan Location within Russia
- Coordinates: 43°34′N 47°17′E
- Country: Russia
- Region: Republic of Dagestan
- District: Laksky District
- Time zone: UTC+3:00

Luguvalu (Russian: Лугувалу) is a rural locality (a selo) in Kulushatsky Selsoviet, Laksky District, Republic of Dagestan, Russia. The population was 40 as of 2010.

== Nationalities ==
Laks live there.
