= Suyutkino =

Suyutkino Суюткино
- Selo
- Location within Republic of Dagestan Location within Russia
- Coordinates: 44°11′N 47°14′E
- Country: Russia
- Region: Republic of Dagestan
- District: Kizlyarsky District
- Time zone: UTC+3:00

Suyutkino (Russian: Суюткино) is a rural locality (a selo) in Kraynovsky Selsoviet, Kizlyarsky District, Republic of Dagestan, Russia. The population was 98 as of 2010. There is 1 street.

== Geography ==
It is located 62 km northeast of Kizlyar, 27 km northwest of Kraynovka.

== Nationalities ==
Avars, Dargins and Russians live there.
