= Urtsaki =

Urtsaki Урцаки
- Selo
- Location within Republic of Dagestan Location within Russia
- Coordinates: 42°05′N 47°33′E
- Country: Russia
- Region: Republic of Dagestan
- District: Dakhadayevsky District
- Time zone: UTC+3:00

Urtsaki (Russian: Урцаки) is a rural locality (a selo) in Sutbuksky Selsoviet, Dakhadayevsky District, Republic of Dagestan, Russia. The population was 300 as of 2010. There are 3 streets.

== Geography ==
Urtsaki is located 26 km southwest of Urkarakh (the district's administrative centre) by road. Sutbuk and Kubachi are the nearest rural localities.
