= Shivor =

Shivor Шивор
- Selo
- Location within Republic of Dagestan Location within Russia
- Coordinates: 42°42′N 46°15′E
- Country: Russia
- Region: Republic of Dagestan
- District: Botlikhsky District
- Time zone: UTC+3:00

Shivor (Russian: Шивор) is a rural locality (a selo) in Chankovsky Selsoviet, Botlikhsky District, Republic of Dagestan, Russia. The population was 85 as of 2010.

== Geography ==
Shivor is located 18 km northeast of Botlikh (the district's administrative centre) by road. Chanko is the nearest rural locality.
