= Khini =

Khini Хини
- Selo
- Location within Republic of Dagestan Location within Russia
- Coordinates: 42°31′N 46°42′E
- Country: Russia
- Region: Republic of Dagestan
- District: Khunzakhsky District
- Time zone: UTC+3:00

Khini (Russian: Хини) is a rural locality (a selo) in Khunzakhsky Selsoviet, Khunzakhsky District, Republic of Dagestan, Russia. Population: 251 (2010 census); 183 (2002 census); 107 (1989 Soviet census). There are 3 streets in this selo.

== Geography ==
It is located 1 km from Khunzakh (the district's administrative centre), 81 km from Makhachkala (capital of Dagestan) and 1,648 km from Moscow. Khunzakh is the nearest rural locality.
