= Trisanchi =

Trisanchi Трисанчи
- Selo
- Location within Republic of Dagestan Location within Russia
- Coordinates: 42°07′N 47°42′E
- Country: Russia
- Region: Republic of Dagestan
- District: Dakhadayevsky District
- Time zone: UTC+3:00

Trisanchi (Russian: Трисанчи) is a rural locality (a selo) and the administrative centre of Trisanchinsky Selsoviet, Dakhadayevsky District, Republic of Dagestan, Russia. The population was 1,516 as of 2010. There are 4 streets.

== Geography ==
Trisanchi is located 12 km southeast of Urkarakh (the district's administrative centre) by road. Zubanchi and Kudagu are the nearest rural localities.
