= Mokok, Tsuntinsky District, Republic of Dagestan =

Mokok Мокок
- Selo
- Location within Republic of Dagestan Location within Russia
- Coordinates: 42°15′N 45°54′E
- Country: Russia
- Region: Republic of Dagestan
- District: Tsuntinsky District
- Time zone: UTC+3:00

Mokok (Russian: Мокок) is a rural locality (a selo) in Tsuntinsky District, Republic of Dagestan, Russia. Population: 859 (2021 census); 516 (2002 census); 380 (1989 Soviet census). There is one street in this village.

== Geography ==
Selo is located 153 km from Makhachkala (capital of Dagestan) and 1,648 km from Moscow. Derikh is the nearest rural locality.
