= Tsitsimakh =

Tsitsimakh Цицимах
- Selo
- Location within Republic of Dagestan Location within Russia
- Coordinates: 42°13′N 45°49′E
- Country: Russia
- Region: Republic of Dagestan
- District: Tsuntinsky District
- Time zone: UTC+3:00

Tsitsimakh (Russian: Цицимах) is a rural locality (a selo) in Tsuntinsky District, Republic of Dagestan, Russia. Population: 52 (2021 census); 75 (2002 census); 91 (1989 Soviet census). There is 1 street in this selo.

== Geography ==
Selo is located 161 km from Makhachkala (capital of Dagestan) and 1,650 km from Moscow. Zindukh is the nearest rural locality.
