= Karagas, Republic of Dagestan =

Karagas Карагас
- Selo
- Location within Republic of Dagestan Location within Russia
- Coordinates: 44°15′N 45°22′E
- Country: Russia
- Region: Republic of Dagestan
- District: Nogaysky District
- Time zone: UTC+3:00

Karagas (Russian: Карагас) is a rural locality (a selo) and the administrative centre of Karagassky Selsoviet, Nogaysky District, Republic of Dagestan, Russia. The population was 1,972 as of 2010. There are 21 streets.

== Geography ==
Karagas is located 59 km northwest of Terekli-Mekteb (the district's administrative centre) by road. Terekli-Mekteb is the nearest rural locality.

== Nationalities ==
Nogais live there.
