= Kardonovka =

Kardonovka Кардоновка
- Selo
- Location within Republic of Dagestan Location within Russia
- Coordinates: 43°49′N 46°50′E
- Country: Russia
- Region: Republic of Dagestan
- District: Kizlyarsky District
- Time zone: UTC+3:00

Kardonovka (Russian: Кардоновка) is a rural locality (a selo) and the administrative centre of Kardonovsky Selsoviet, Kizlyarsky District, Republic of Dagestan, Russia. The population was 1,875 as of 2010. There are 10 streets.

== Geography ==
Kardonovka is located 12 km southeast of Kizlyar (the district's administrative centre) by road. Dagestanskoye and Yefimovka are the nearest rural localities.

== Nationalities ==
Avars, Dargins, Russians, Laks and Lezgins live there.
