= Bondarevskoye =

Bondarevskoye Бондареновское
- Selo
- Location within Republic of Dagestan Location within Russia
- Coordinates: 43°54′N 46°38′E
- Country: Russia
- Region: Republic of Dagestan
- District: Kizlyarsky District
- Time zone: UTC+3:00

Bondarevskoye (Russian: Бондареновское) is a rural locality (a selo) in Kosyakinsky Selsoviet, Kizlyarsky District, Republic of Dagestan, Russia. The population was 507 as of 2010. There are 5 streets.

== Geography ==
Bondarevskoye is located 12 km northwest of Kizlyar (the district's administrative centre) by road. Mikheyevskoye and Novogeorgiyevka are the nearest rural localities.

== Nationalities ==
Dargins, Avars and Russians live there.
