= Alburi Lam =

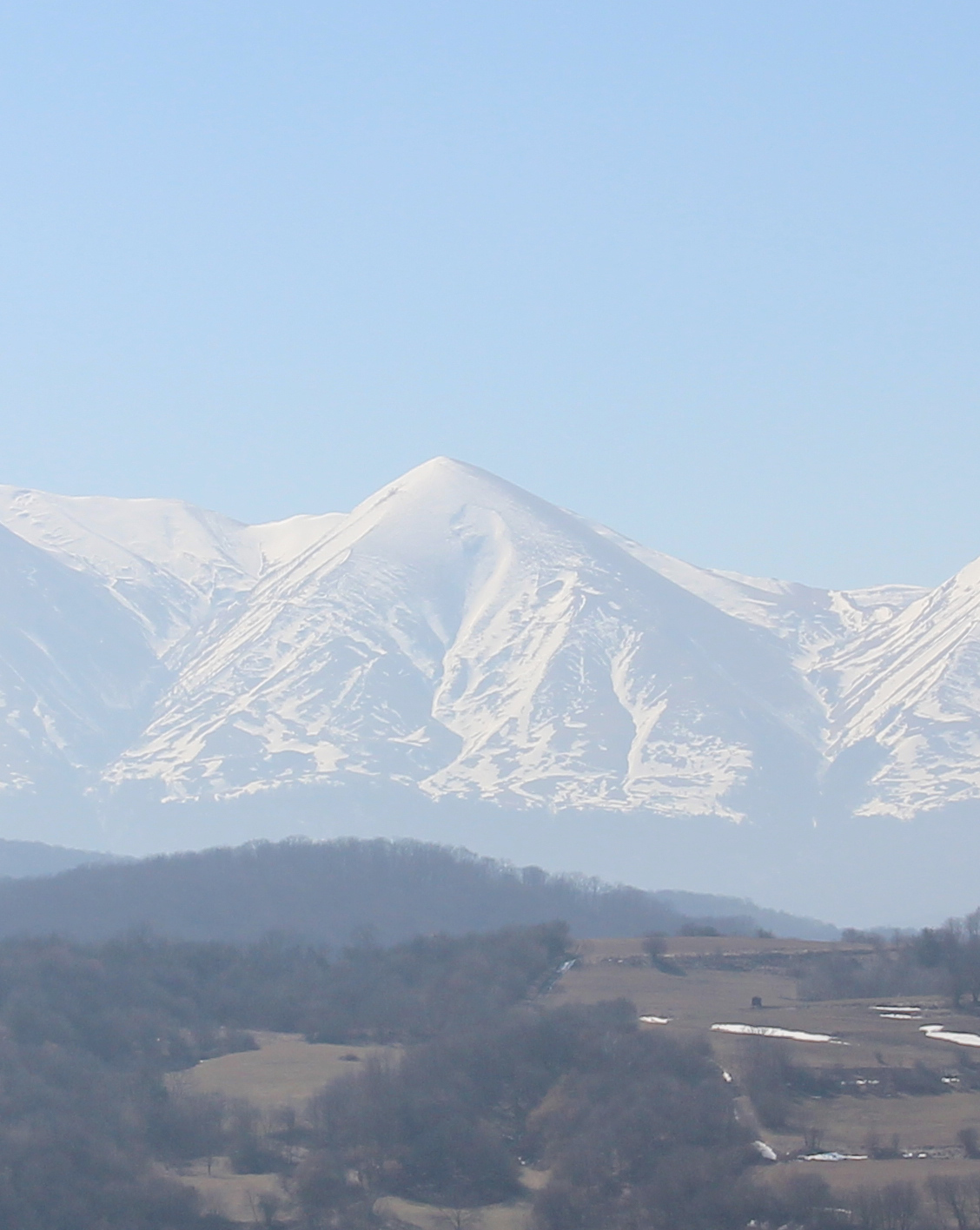

Highest point
- Elevation: 2,177.0 m (7,142.4 ft)
- Coordinates: 42°56′06″N 46°31′56″E

Geography
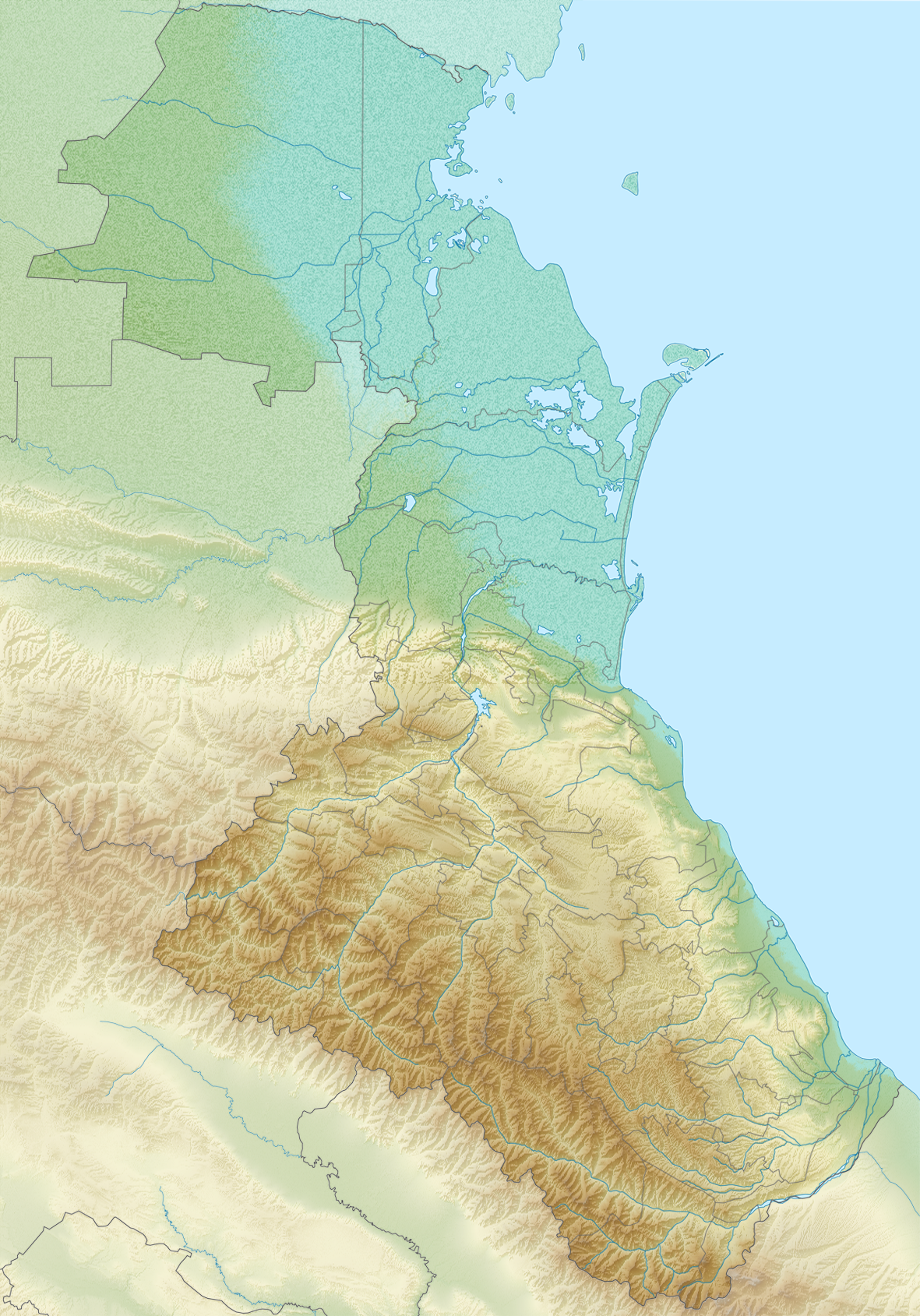
- Location within Republic of Dagestan
- Location: Dagestan

Mountain Alburi Lam (Chechen: Олбар-Лам or Албур-Лам) is located in the Kazbekovsky District of Dagestan, bordering Chechnya, to the west of Mount Tsanta. A continuation of Salatau ridge, it lies at an altitude of 2177,0 meters, close to the villages Almak, Burtunay, Simsir, Majgars, Shircha-Evla and the now non-existent Alburi-Otar and Haniduk.

== Name ==
According to legend, the mountain Alburi Lam was named after its owner Alburi. Tradition says that a hired shepherd grazed cattle belonging to Alburi when hired shepherd died. Alburi sent a tombstone in the village Almak, where he was born a shepherd – Alburi are from the Chechen Akkoy (Chechen: Ӏаккой) teip (clan). He also owned the hamlet Alburi-Otar, which was located south of the village Aukh Shircha-Evla.

Due to the fact that residents of nearby villages distilled off their herds on pastures of the mountain, between them and Alburi often had conflicts, after the tragic events, when the Caucasian War sons Alburi Gurash died on the side of Shamil (Chechen: ГӀураш) and Dzhanbyura (Chechen: Жанбуьра).

It is said that the mother of the two brothers, named Aytugan (Chechen: АйтугӀа) were killed when standing on them in Aktahs-Aukh, did not cry and did not show any sadness, and even showed the joy and fun at the fact that her sons suffered the death of the righteous. She even lamented that one of the sons was missing in some trip and was not with them in order to obtain the death of the righteous, as the brothers got it. Following these events, the mountain was presented to the Imam Shamil Alburi then conflicts over pastures in the mountains no longer occurs, and the mountain itself was named Alburi Lam.

In the work of A.S. Suleimanov entitled Toponymy of Chechnya on the page "Microtoponymy of Pkh'archkhoshka", Bukh'ira lam is described as "Pointed Mountain" – a mountain with a sharp peak, pasture, alpine meadows, hayfields, located in the south of the villages of Pkh'archkhoshka and Shircha -Evla. The name was given by the Aukhites.

== Nature ==
Mountain goats, wild boar and chamois live on Alburi Lam. Bears are also present.
