= Kalininaul =

Kalininaul (Russian: Калининаул) is the name of several rural localities in the Republic of Dagestan, Russia:

- Kalininaul, Kazbekovsky District, Republic of Dagestan, a selo in Kazbekovsky District
- Kalininaul, Nogaysky District, Republic of Dagestan, a selo in Arslanbekovsky Selsoviet of Nogaysky District
- Kalininaul, Tlyaratinsky District, Republic of Dagestan, a selo in Kardibsky Selsoviet of Tlyaratinsky District
