= Leninaul =

Leninaul (Russian: Ленинаул) is the name of several rural localities in the Republic of Dagestan, Russia:

- Leninaul, Kazbekovsky District, Republic of Dagestan, a selo in Kazbekovsky District
- Leninaul, Nogaysky District, Republic of Dagestan, a selo in Arslanbekovsky Selsoviet of Nogaysky District
