= Ikha =

Ikha Иха Ихха
- Selo
- Location within Republic of Dagestan Location within Russia
- Coordinates: 43°03′N 46°47′E
- Country: Russia
- Region: Republic of Dagestan
- District: Kazbekovsky District
- Time zone: UTC+3:00

Ikha (Russian: Иха; Avar: Ихха) is a rural locality (a selo) in Khubarsky Selsoviet, Kazbekovsky District, Republic of Dagestan, Russia. The population was 462 as of 2010.

== Geography ==
Ikha is located 19 km east of Dylym (the district's administrative centre) by road. Khubar and Novo-Zubutli are the nearest rural localities.

== Nationalities ==
Avars live there.

== Famous residents ==
- Zubair Saydulayev (chairman of the collective farm Friendship, awarded the Order of the Red Star)
