= Akhsu, Republic of Dagestan =

Akhsu Ахсу Ахъсу
- Selo
- Location within Republic of Dagestan Location within Russia
- Coordinates: 42°55′N 46°41′E
- Country: Russia
- Region: Republic of Dagestan
- District: Kazbekovsky District
- Time zone: UTC+3:00

Akhsu (Russian: Ахсу; Avar: Ахъсу) is a rural locality (a selo) in Artlukhsky Selsoviet, Kazbekovsky District, Republic of Dagestan, Russia. The population was 65 as of 2010.

== Nationalities ==
Avars live there.

== Geography ==
Akhsu is located 24 km southeast of Dylym (the district's administrative centre) by road. Gertma and Guni are the nearest rural localities.
