= Gertma =

Gertma Гертма
- Selo
- Location within Republic of Dagestan Location within Russia
- Coordinates: 42°59′N 46°44′E
- Country: Russia
- Region: Republic of Dagestan
- District: Kazbekovsky District
- Time zone: UTC+3:00

Gertma (Russian: Гертма) is a rural locality (a selo) in Kazbekovsky District, Republic of Dagestan, Russia. The population was 1,558 as of 2010. There are 18 streets.

== Nationalities ==
Avars live there.

== Geography ==
Gertma is located 17 km southeast of Dylym (the district's administrative centre) by road. Guni and Khubar are the nearest rural localities.
