= Karasu, Republic of Dagestan =

Karasu Карасу Кара-Сув
- Selo
- Location within Republic of Dagestan Location within Russia
- Coordinates: 44°04′N 45°54′E
- Country: Russia
- Region: Republic of Dagestan
- District: Nogaysky District
- Time zone: UTC+3:00

Karasu (Russian: Карасу; Nogai: Кара-Сув, Kara-Suv) is a rural locality (a selo) and the administrative centre of Karasuvsky Selsoviet, Nogaysky District, Republic of Dagestan, Russia. The population was 761 as of 2010. There are 7 streets.

== Geography ==
Karasu is located 10 km southeast of Terekli-Mekteb (the district's administrative centre) by road. Terekli-Mekteb and Kalininaul are the nearest rural localities.

== Nationalities ==
Nogais live there.
