= Chervlyonnye Buruny =

Chervlyonnye Buruny Червлённые Буруны
- Selo
- Location within Republic of Dagestan Location within Russia
- Coordinates: 44°09′N 45°37′E
- Country: Russia
- Region: Republic of Dagestan
- District: Nogaysky District
- Time zone: UTC+3:00

Chervlyonnye Buruny (Russian: Червлённые Буруны) is a rural locality (a selo) in Nogaysky District, Republic of Dagestan, Russia. Population: 1,751 (2021 census); 1,577 (2002 census); 1,291 (1989 Soviet census). There are 25 streets. Selo was founded in 1928.

== Geography ==
Chervlyonnye Buruny is located 24 km of from Terekli-Mekteb (the district's administrative centre) by road. Batyr-Murza and Boranchi are the nearest rural localities.

== Nationalities ==
Nogais and Chechens live there.
