= Inchkha =

Inchkha Инчха (Russian) Инчха (Avar) Ичка (Avar)
- Selo
- Location within Republic of Dagestan Location within Russia
- Coordinates: 43°05′N 46°46′E
- Country: Russia
- Region: Republic of Dagestan
- District: Kazbekovsky District
- Time zone: UTC+3:00

Inchkha (Russian: Инчха; Avar: Инчха, Avar: Ичка) is a rural locality (a selo) in Kazbekovsky District, Republic of Dagestan, Russia. The population was 2,077 in 2010. There are 18 streets.

== Geography ==
Inchkha is located 14 kilometres (8.7 mi) southwest of Dylym (the district's administrative centre) by road. Khubar and Miatli are the nearest rural localities.

== Nationalities ==
Avars live there.
