= Gostala =

Gostala Гостала Гъозултала
- Selo
- Location within Republic of Dagestan Location within Russia
- Coordinates: 43°04′N 46°41′E
- Country: Russia
- Region: Republic of Dagestan
- District: Kazbekovsky District
- Time zone: UTC+3:00

Gostala (Russian: Гостала; Avar: Гъозултала) is a rural locality (a selo) in Kazbekovsky District, Republic of Dagestan, Russia. There are 5 streets.

== Demographics ==
The population was 517 as of 2010.

== Nationalities ==
Avars live there.

== Geography ==
Gostala is located 6 km east of Dylym (the district's administrative centre) by road Dylym is the nearest rural locality.
