= Khubar =

Khubar Хубар
- Selo
- Location within Republic of Dagestan Location within Russia
- Coordinates: 43°02′N 46°45′E
- Country: Russia
- Region: Republic of Dagestan
- District: Kazbekovsky District
- Time zone: UTC+3:00

Khubar (Russian: Хубар) is a rural locality (a selo) and the administrative centre of Khubarsky Selsoviet, Kazbekovsky District, Republic of Dagestan, Russia. The population was 1,304 as of 2010. There are 27 streets.

== Geography ==
Khubar is located 13 km southeast of Dylym (the district's administrative centre) by road. Guni and Gertma are the nearest rural localities.

== Nationalities ==
Avars live there.
