= Uy-Salgan =

Uy-Salgan Уй-Салган Уьй-Салган
- Selo
- Location within Republic of Dagestan Location within Russia
- Coordinates: 44°13′N 45°09′E
- Country: Russia
- Region: Republic of Dagestan
- District: Nogaysky District
- Time zone: UTC+3:00

Uy-Salgan (Russian: Уй-Салган; Nogai: Уьй-Салган, Üy-Salgan) is a rural locality (a selo) in Oratyubinsky Selsoviet, Nogaysky District, Republic of Dagestan, Russia. Population: 332 (2010 census); 398 (2002 census); 552 (1989 Soviet census). There are 7 streets. Selo was founded in 1914.

== Geography ==
It is located 57 km west from Terekli-Mekteb.

== Nationalities ==
Nogais live there.
