= Kalininaul, Nogaysky District, Republic of Dagestan =

Kalininaul Калининаул Таьтли-Булак
- Selo
- Location within Republic of Dagestan Location within Russia
- Coordinates: 44°09′N 45°59′E
- Country: Russia
- Region: Republic of Dagestan
- District: Nogaysky District
- Time zone: UTC+3:00

Kalininaul (Russian: Калининаул; Nogai: Таьтли-Булак, Tätli-Bulak) is a rural locality (a selo) in Arslanbekovsky Selsoviet, Nogaysky District, Republic of Dagestan, Russia. The population was 535 as of 2010. There are 8 streets.

== Geography ==
Kalininaul is located 11 km east of Terekli-Mekteb (the district's administrative centre) by road and sourh from Leninaul. Leninaul and Terekli-Mekteb are the nearest rural localities.

== Nationalities ==
Nogais live there.
