= Saygidpasha Umakhanov =

Russian politician

- Сайгидпаша Умаханов
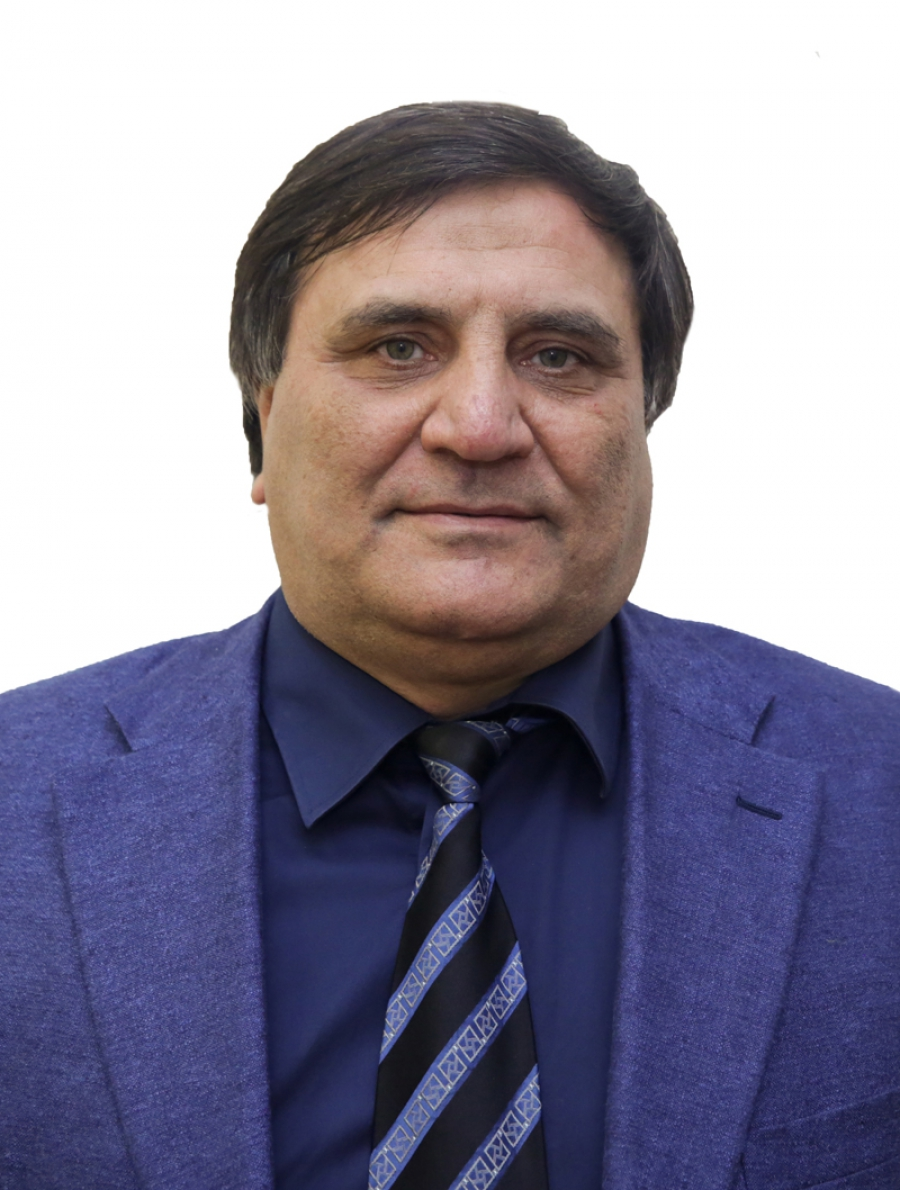

Deputy of the 8th State Duma
- Incumbent
- Assumed office 19 September 2021

Personal details
- Born: 3 April 1962 (age 64) Burtunay, Kazbekovsky District, Dagestan Autonomous Soviet Socialist Republic, USSR
- Party: United Russia
- Education: Dagestan State University

Saygidpasha Umakhanov (Russian: Сайгидпаша Дарбишевич Умаханов; born 3 April 1962, Burtunay, Kazbekovsky District) is a Russian political figure and a deputy of the 8th State Duma.

Umakhanov started his political career in 1997 when he became deputy of the People's Assembly of the Republic of Dagestan. In August–September 1999, during the invasion of the republic led by militants Shamil Basayev and Ibn al-Khattab, Umakhanov led the people's militia units in Khasavyurt. From 1997 to 2015, he headed the administration of Khasavyurt. In 2015, he became the Minister of Transport, Energy and Communications of Dagestan. From 2020 to 2021, he was an advisor to the Head of the Republic of Dagestan. Since September 2021, he has served as deputy of the 8th State Duma.

== Sanctions ==
In December 2022 the EU sanctioned Saygidpasha Umakhanov in relation to the 2022 Russian invasion of Ukraine.

== Awards ==
- Order of Friendship
- Order of Honour (Russia)
