= Tashaw-Hadji =

Prominent leader of the Caucasian resistance during Caucasian War

- Воккха Хьаж/Taşaw-haci Endireyli
- Born: Tashaw; 1770; Endirey, Kumykia
- Died: 1845 (aged 74–75); Sayasan, Chechnya
- Other name: Tashev-Hadji
- Military career
- Allegiance: Caucasian Imamate
- Branch: Army
- Rank: Imam, Naib
- Conflicts: Caucasian War

Tashaw-Hadji (Note: Chechen: Воккха Хьаж; Kumyk: Taşaw-haci Endireyli • Also known as Tashev-Hadji and Tashav-Hadji from Endirey) (1770 – died 1843 or later) was one of the prominent leaders of the North Caucasian resistance during the Caucasian War, a companion of imam Shamil. He was the imam of Chechnya since 1834. Upon the death of Gazi-Muhammad, he was one of the major candidates at the elections of the Imam of Dagestan, losing to Shamil by one vote only. Later, he became one of the mudirs of Imam Shamil. He was also the governor (naib) of Aukh.

== Early biography ==
=== Origin ===
Tashaw-Hadji was born in the village of Endirey in the Northern Kumykia. According to the majority of sources he was of Kumyk origin.

Some contemporary historians claim that the ethnicity of Tashaw-Hadji remains unknown, while others suggest that he could have been both a Kumyk or a Chechen.

For example, Moshe Gammer, a researcher of Caucasus, writes that in the local written sources in Arabic Tashaw calls himself "al-Indiri", which means "from Endirey", concluding that Tashaw could have been a Kumyk or a Chechen, as the Kumyk village of Endirey had a Chechen minority. Gammer says Tashaw was an "Indiri Kumyk, leader of Chechens". Tashaw-Hadji himself spoke vaguely about his ethnic belonging, same as imam Shamil.

There is also a version that he could have been a Chechen, born in the village of Michik. Soviet researcher Anna Zaks writes about Tashaw as a Kumyk, a native of Endirey, criticizing the version about his Chechen origin and about his alleged birth in Michik, citing the work of imam Shamil's personal scribe Muhammad Tahir al-Qarahi. Tashaw did not speak the Chechen language.

=== Before the Caucasian war ===
In the 1820s, Tashaw was a mullah in his native Endirey. He studied under prominent Dagestani religious figures, Said of Arakan and Muhammad of Yarag.

Tashaw-Hadji took part in the resistance to the Russian Empire led by Beibulat Taimiev in 1818-1826, along with his fellow Endireyans.

In 1831, Tashaw left Endirey, when the exposure of Endirey and its gate-keeping location made it a constant target of all warring parties. According to Anna Zaks, the reason to leave Endirey was in the destruction of a part of the village by the first Imam of Dagestan Gazi-Muhammad, who by doing so hoped to force the wavering part of Endireyans to join his struggle. It was at that time that Tashaw fled Endirey and joined the Imam. At the exact same time when Endirey was under attack from Gazi-Muhammad, its crop fields were being burned by the Russian troops in retaliation for resisting the Russian rule. That was the reason why Russian documents referred to Tashaw as to a "fugitive of the Endirey village".

According to another view, proposed by the professor Hasan Orazaev, who refers to local archive materials, the reason for Tashaw leaving Endirey was the treachery from the local "rich men and mullahs", who secretly accepted the submission to the Russian Tsar. Seeing that local population rose against this betrayal of the nobility, even ready to be killed, but not subdued, Tashaw might have decided to join the fight from the mountainous and more protected areas, as Endirey's lowland and easily accessible location had led to it being ravaged multiple times by the Russian troops, during many military campaigns.

After Tashaw had to leave Endirey, he initially settled in Salatavia in the village of Almak, then moved to Chechnya, to the village of Sayasan, which became his last home until his death in 1843 or later.

== Bibliography ==
=== English sources ===
- Gammer, M. (2006). Harris, J. (ed.). The Lone Wolf and the Bear: Three Centuries of Russian Defiance of Russian Rule. Pitt Series in Russian and East European Studies. Pittsburgh: University of Pittsburgh Press. pp. 1–252. ISBN 0-8229-5898-8.
- Gould, R. R. (2016-09-20). Writers and Rebels: The Literature of Insurgency in the Caucasus. Eurasia Past and Present. New Haven, London: Yale University Press. pp. 1–336. ISBN 978-0300220759.

=== Russian sources ===
- Ахмадов, Я. З.; Хасмагомадов, Э. Х. (2005). История Чечни в XIX—XX веках [History of Chechnya in the XIX-XX centuries] (in Russian). М.: Пульс. pp. 1–995. ISBN 5-93486-046-1.
- Волконский, Н. А. (1889). Чернявский, И. С. (ed.). "Война на Восточном Кавказе с 1824 по 1834 г. в связи с мюридизмом: XVI" [War in the Eastern Caucasus from 1824 to 1834 in connection with Muridism: 16]. Кавказский сборник (in Russian). 13. Тифлис: Тип. Окружного штаба кавказского военного округа.
- Гаммер, М. (1998). Шамиль. Мусульманское сопротивление царизму. Завоевание Чечни и Дагестана [Shamil. Muslim resistance to tsarism. Conquest of Chechnya and Dagestan]. Воспоминания участников Кавказской войны XIX века (in Russian). Translated by Симаков, В. М.: КРОН-ПРЕСС. pp. 1–509. ISBN 5-232-00702-5.
- Ермолов, А. П. (1867). "Краткие сведения о деятельности на Кавказе главнокомандующего Отдельным Кавказским Корпусом, генерал от инфантерии, Алексея Петровича Ермолова" [Brief information about the activities in the Caucasus of the Commander-in-Chief of the Separate Caucasian Corps, General of Infantry, Alexei Petrovich Yermolov]. In Задолинный, К. А. (ed.). Кавказский календарь на 1868 год [Caucasian Calendar for 1868] (in Russian). Тф.: Глав. Управ. pp. 1–, VII.
- Зубов, П. П. (1835). Картина Кавказскаго края, принадлежащаго Россіи и сопредѣльныхъ оному земель въ историческомъ, статистическомъ, этнографическомъ, финансовомъ и торговомъ отношеніяхъ [A picture of the Caucasus region belonging to Russia and adjacent lands in historical, statistical, ethnographic, financial and trade relations] (in Russian). Vol. 3. СПб.: Типографія Конрада Вингебера. pp. 1–272.
- Казбек, Г. Н. (1885). Куринцы в Чечне и Дагестане, 1834-1861 г. : очерк истории 79-го пехотного Куринского его иимператорского высочества великого князя Павла Александровича полка [Kurins in Chechnya and Dagestan, 1834-1861: an essay on the history of the 79th Infantry Kurinsky Regiment of His Imperial Highness Grand Duke Pavel Aleksandrovich] (in Russian). Тф.: Тип. А. А. Михельсона. pp. I–XVIII, 1–484.
- Каяев Замир-Али (1990). "Тарикат и мюридизм в Дагестане" [Tarikat and Muridism in Dagestan]. Советский Дагестан (in Russian) (4): 1–.
- Мухаммад Тахир аль-Карахи (1941). Хроника Мухаммеда Тахира ал-Карахи о дагестанских войнах в период Шамиля [Chronicle of Muhammad Tahir al-Karahi about the Dagestan wars during the period of Shamil]. Труды НИИ востоковедения АН СССР (in Russian). Vol. XXXV. Translated by Барабанов, А. М. М.—Л.: Изд-во Академии наук СССР. pp. 1–335.
- Назир ад-Дургели (2012). Услада умов в биографиях дагестанских ученых [The delight of minds in the biographies of Dagestan scientists] (in Russian). М. pp. 1–.
- Оразаев, Г. М.-Р.; Ханмурзаев, И. И. (2023). Ташав-Хаджи из Эндирея — Герой Кавказской войны (Сборник исследований и материалов) [Tashav-Hadji from Endirey, Hero of the Caucasian War (Collection of documents and materials)] (in Russian). Мх. pp. 1–.
- Покровский, Н. И. (2000) [1941]. Гаджиев, В. Г.; Покровский, Н. Н. (eds.). Кавказские войны и имамат Шамиля [Caucasian Wars and Shamil's Imamate] (in Russian). М.: РОССПЭН. pp. 1–511.
- Семенов, Н. С. (1895). Туземцы Северо-Восточного Кавказа [Natives of the Northeast Caucasus] (in Russian). СПб.: Тип. А. Хомского и Ко. pp. 1–487.
- Ханмурзаев, И. И. (2017). "О поэтическом произведении Ташава-Хаджи Ал-Индири «О спрашивающий меня о господах»" [About the poetic work of Tashava-Khadji Al-Indiri "Oh, asking me about the lords"]. In Малеки, Р.; Гасанов, М. М.; Магомедов, А. Р.; Мамед-задзе, Н. Г.; Галбацова, Ш. С. (eds.). Сборник материалов II. Международной научной конференции (г. Махачкала, 12 октября 2017 г.) [Collection of materials of 2nd International Scientific Conference (Makhachkala, October 12, 2017)] (in Russian). Мх.: Изд-во ДГУ. pp. 168–173. ISBN 978-5-9913-0166-4.
- Хуан Ван-Гален (2002). "Два года в России" [Two years in Russia]. Кавказская война: истоки и начало, 1770–1820 годы [Caucasian War: origins and beginning, 1770-1820] (in Russian). Translated by Цывьян, Л. М.; Квятковская, М. З. СПб.: Изд-во журн. «Звезда». pp. 349–455.
