= Aukh District =

Aukh District Ауховский район (Russian)
- District

Other transcription(s)
  - Chechen: Ӏовхойн кӀошт
- Location of Aukh District in the Republic of Dagestan
- Coordinates: 43°07′N 46°29′E
- Country: Russia
- Federal subject: Republic of Dagestan
- Established: 5 October 1943
- Administrative center: Yaryksu-Aukh

Municipal structure
  - Municipally incorporated as: Aukh Municipal District

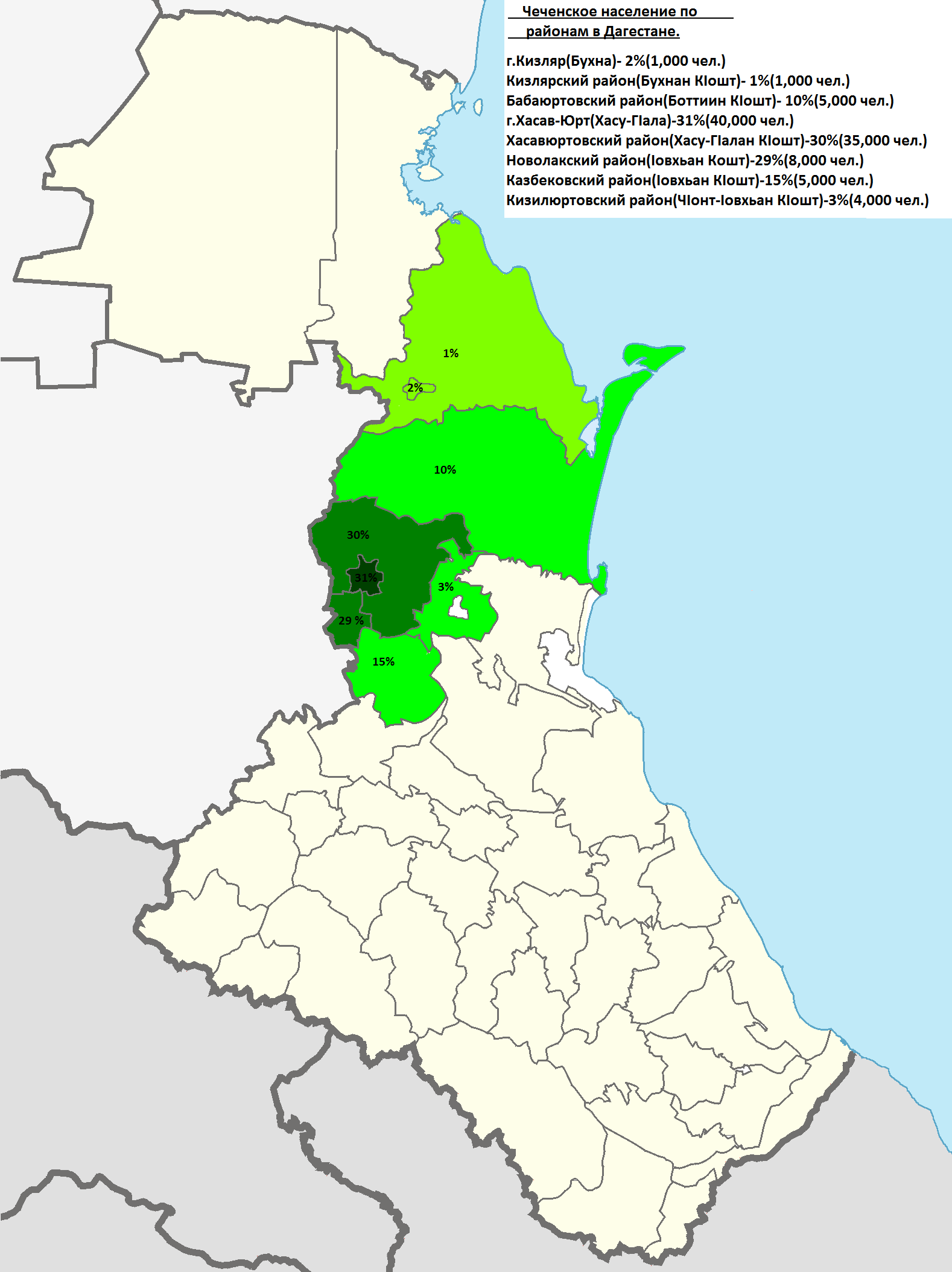
Chechen ethnic-Aukhs in Dagestan

At the end of February 1944, Aukh-Chechens were evicted along with Chechens and Ingush from Checheno-Ingushetia to Central Asia, and the district was renamed Novolaksky District. Part of the district was transferred to the neighboring Kazbekovsky District and settled by Avars from Almak. According to the decision of the III Congress of People's Deputies, the district should be restored within the borders of 1944, including the villages of Leninaul and Kalininaul in the Aukh district. The Lak population moved to the territory north of Makhachkala where the Novolaksky district would be formed.

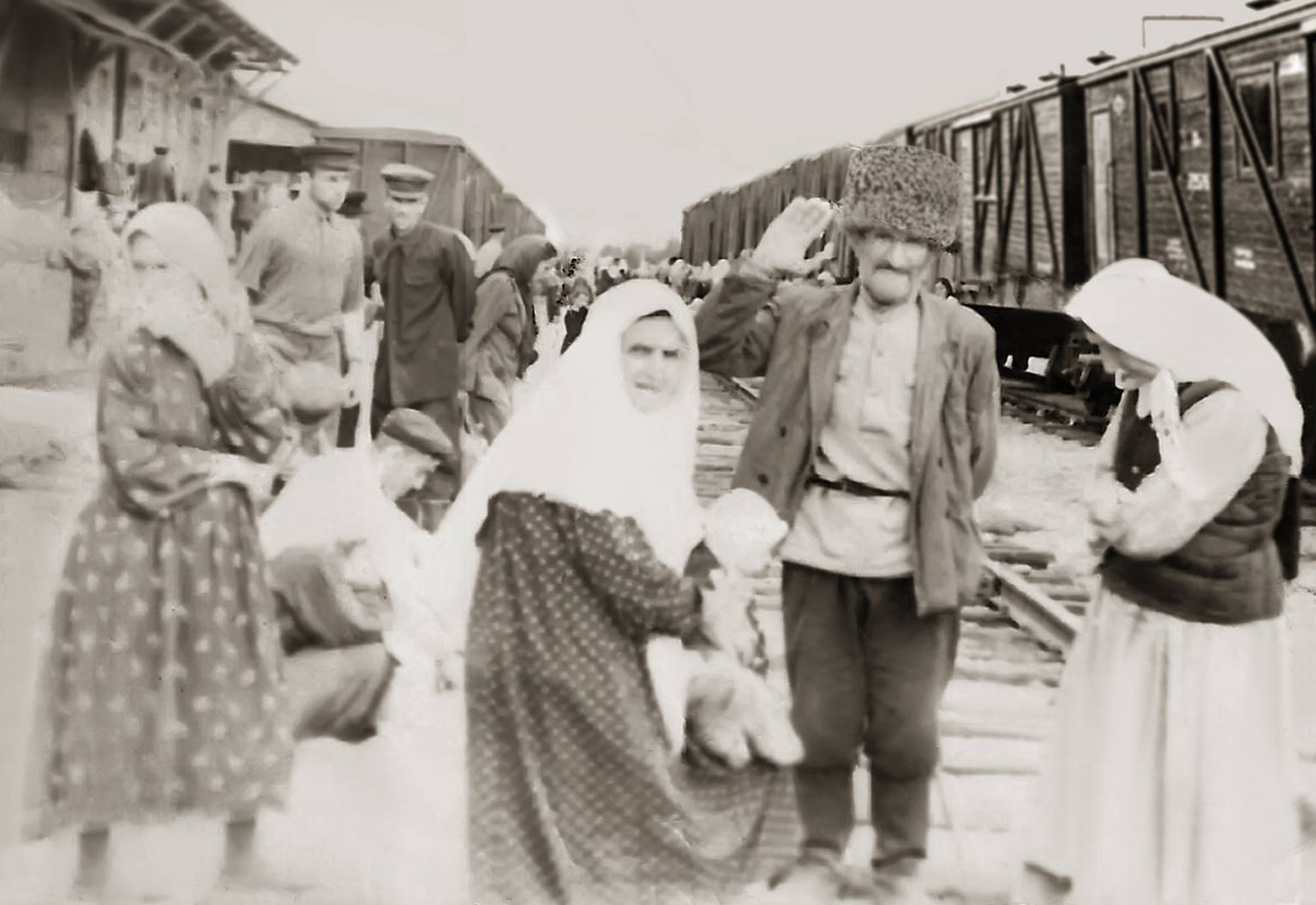
Chechen residents of the village of Yurt-Auh, awaiting return to their homes at a railway station in Bishkek, 1957

== History ==
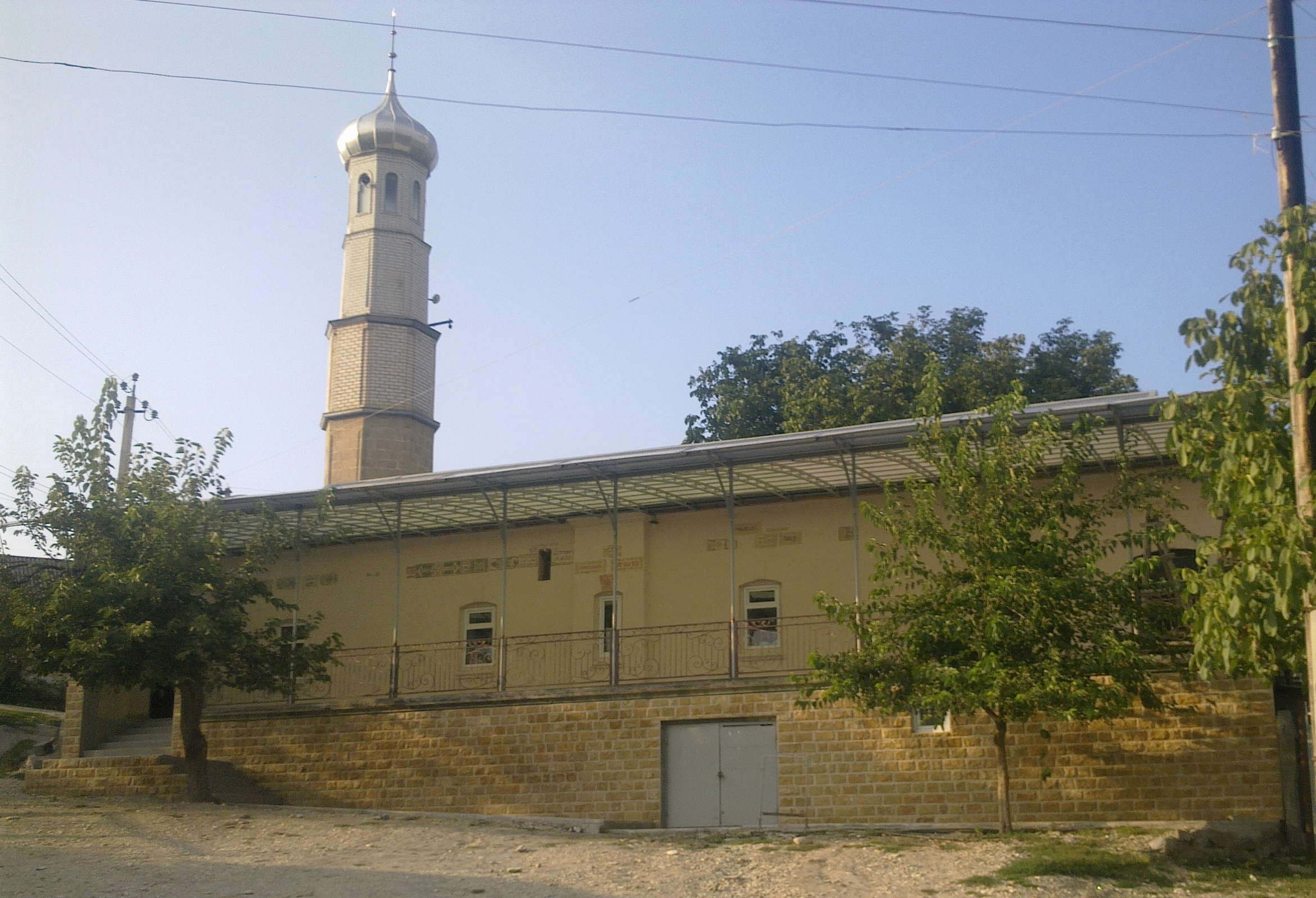
20th century "Mosque in Yurt-Aukh" in the village of Yurt-Aukh

In documents from the 16th century, the region is known under the name "Okotskaya Zemlyetsa", which was a fief, where at that time the owners of the Murzy Isherimovs, with the main settlement "Old Okokh" (Shircha-Aukh).

After the end of the Caucasian War, Aukh was incorporated into the Khasavyurt district of the Terek Oblast. The rest Chechen-Ingush territories of the Terek region (Terek Oblast) also entered. According to the census of 1897 about 20 thousand Aukh-Chechens lived in the Khasavyurt district.

As a result of the annexation of the Khasavyurt district to Dagestan, thousands of Aukh people turned out to be artificially cut off from their fellow tribesmen of the remaining Chechens, which negatively affected the further development of Aukh. The accession of Aukh lands by Dagestan was hidden for a long time.

When they learned about the joining of the district to the DASSR, Aukh leaders and ordinary people strongly opposed joining. After that, the pursuit of the Aukh workers began. The repression primarily affected the clergy and former "commanders" and "partisans", and then covered a wide range of people.

In 1943, the Aukh District was established in the foothill area of the Khasavyurt district, taking into account the ethnic composition of the population. It was supposed to take into account the needs of the national development of the population, open schools with teaching in their native language, and establish a seal. Aukh district de jure became an administrative-territorial unit of Dagestan.

After the evukhovtsev were evicted on the basis of the Decree of the Presidium of the Supreme Soviet of the RSFSR of June 7, 1944, the Aukh district was renamed Novolaksky, and part of the territory was transferred to the neighboring Kazbekovsky district. All settlements were also renamed, and the district center from the villages. Yaryksu-Auh was moved to the villages. Banai-Aul, renamed Novolakskoe.

== Homecoming ==
After the issuance of the Decree of the Presidium of the Supreme Soviet of the USSR of January 9, 1957, the Aukh Chechens formally got the opportunity to return home. However, the leadership of the Dagestan Autonomous Soviet Socialist Republic decided to make its own adjustments to the Decree, the consequences of which, in fact, affect so far very negatively on the situation in the region. Commissioners of the so-called "Ornabo". They were equipped with special certificates, which indicated the mandatory locations for Chechens-Aukhivs in Dagestan. At the same time an indispensable condition was stipulated: return is possible only if Chechens-Aukhs agree to settle in the places indicated in the certificates. It was allowed to settle in five districts of Dagestan, the territory of the former Aukh district, the cradle and the ethnic core of Chechens-Aukhovtsy, for them remained under the strictest prohibition. Thus, Aukh Chechens returned to their historical homeland not as rehabilitated, but as labor. Chechens-Aukhs had to settle in their native villages on the plain, the road to the foothill villages - Aukh District - was cordoned off by large police and military units. The decisions of the XX Congress and the Decree of January 9, 1957 were communicated to Chechens Aukhivtsy by the same organizers.

On July 16, 1958, the Council of Ministers of the Dagestan Autonomous Soviet Socialist Republic adopted Resolution No. 254, according to which Aukhov Chechens were forbidden to settle in the villages of Novolaksky and Kazbek districts of Dagestan. The same decree led to a strict passport regime, according to which the returning Chechen-Aukhov residents were not subject to the propischev of the former Aukh district . Clause 3 was introduced into Resolution No. 254, according to which the further return of Chechens-Aukhivs to their homeland will be carried out only during 1959–1960.

Aukhovtsam who managed to get into their foothill villages, were harassed. They were not registered in tribal villages for 10–15 years, did not provide work, were forcibly evicted and arrested; their houses were demolished, families were terrorized, children of Aukhov Chechens were not allowed to go to school. Only Aukh Chechens managed to bury the dead in their ancestral cemeteries. In 1963, by the authorities of Dagestan, by resolution N 254, the “passport regime” and “the strictest observance of the law” were abolished.

Since returning to their homeland, Aukhov Chechens demanded complete rehabilitation from the leadership of the RSFSR and the USSR, the return of all native Aukhov settlements and the restoration of Aukh district and village names, permission to resettle in those villages to those whose parents lived there before the deportation of 1944.

The leaders of the Dagestan Autonomous Soviet Socialist Republic observed a desire to restrict the rights of the arriving Chechen population and to protect their own people. On July 16, 1958, the Council of Ministers of the Republic adopted Resolution No. 254, according to which the Aukh workers had no right to settle in the villages of the Novolaksky and Kazbek districts of the Dagestan Autonomous Soviet Socialist Republic. A rigid passport regime was introduced in relation to the return of the deportation of Chechen-Aukhov workers. Chechens who arrived in Novolaksky and Kazbekovsky districts were not prescribed. The Ministry of Internal Affairs and the Supreme Council of the Dagestan Autonomous Soviet Socialist Republic were instructed to "take measures to strictly observe the passport regime and protect public order in these areas, bringing violators of the law to state responsibility." In 1963, this decree was officially repealed.

== Recovery ==
Since the end of the 1980s, the Aukhov Chechens began to raise the issue of restoring the Aukh district to their former borders and the relocation of Laks and Avars from its territory. In 1991, the 3rd Congress (according to other sources, the 2nd People's Deputies of the Dagestan SSR decided to restore the Aukh district and relocate the Lak population of the Novolaksky district to a new place in the territory of the Dagestan SSR with the formation of the corresponding administrative district.

For these purposes, 8.5 thousand hectares of land were allocated on the territory of the Kirovsky district of Makhachkala and Kizilyurt (now Kumtorkalinsky) district (which were in use by the S. Gabiev collective farms (4539 hectares), the “Worker” (839 hectares) of the Laksky district, the state farm "Yalginsky" (164 hectares) Gunibsky district, OPH DNIISH (1462 hectares) of Makhachkala, state farm "Dakhadaevsky" (1300 hectares) of Kizilyurt district, Makhachkala mekhleskhoz (200 hectares)).

According to the decision of the III Congress of People's Deputies, Leninaul and Kalininul should enter the Aukh district.

Leninaul and Kalininaul - in fact, 40% of the territory of the Aukh district. Today in the villages Kalininaul and Leninaul (now Kazbekovsky district) residents are divided according to ethnic principle: Chechens and Avars live a parallel life - children study in informally “mono-ethnic” schools; villagers go to informally “national” mosques. Avars and Chechens do not go to the condolences to each other. Young people acutely react to domestic clashes and disagreements, occasionally collisions occur.

== Monument ==
In 1989, tension in relations between Chechens, on the one hand, and Laks and Avars, when Chechens-Aukhovtsy demanded the restoration of the Aukh district, which had been settled by Laks and Avars since 1944, intensified.

After the Khasavyurt branch of the Memorial Society established a monument in s. Yaryksu-Aukh to the victims of the deportation of 1944 in the regional center Novolakskoye gathered a large rally of the Laks and Avars, the participants recognized the establishment of the monument as “a center of tension and clashes” and demanded the eviction of Chechen-Aukhivs in the Shelkovskoy region of the Chechen-Ingushetia.

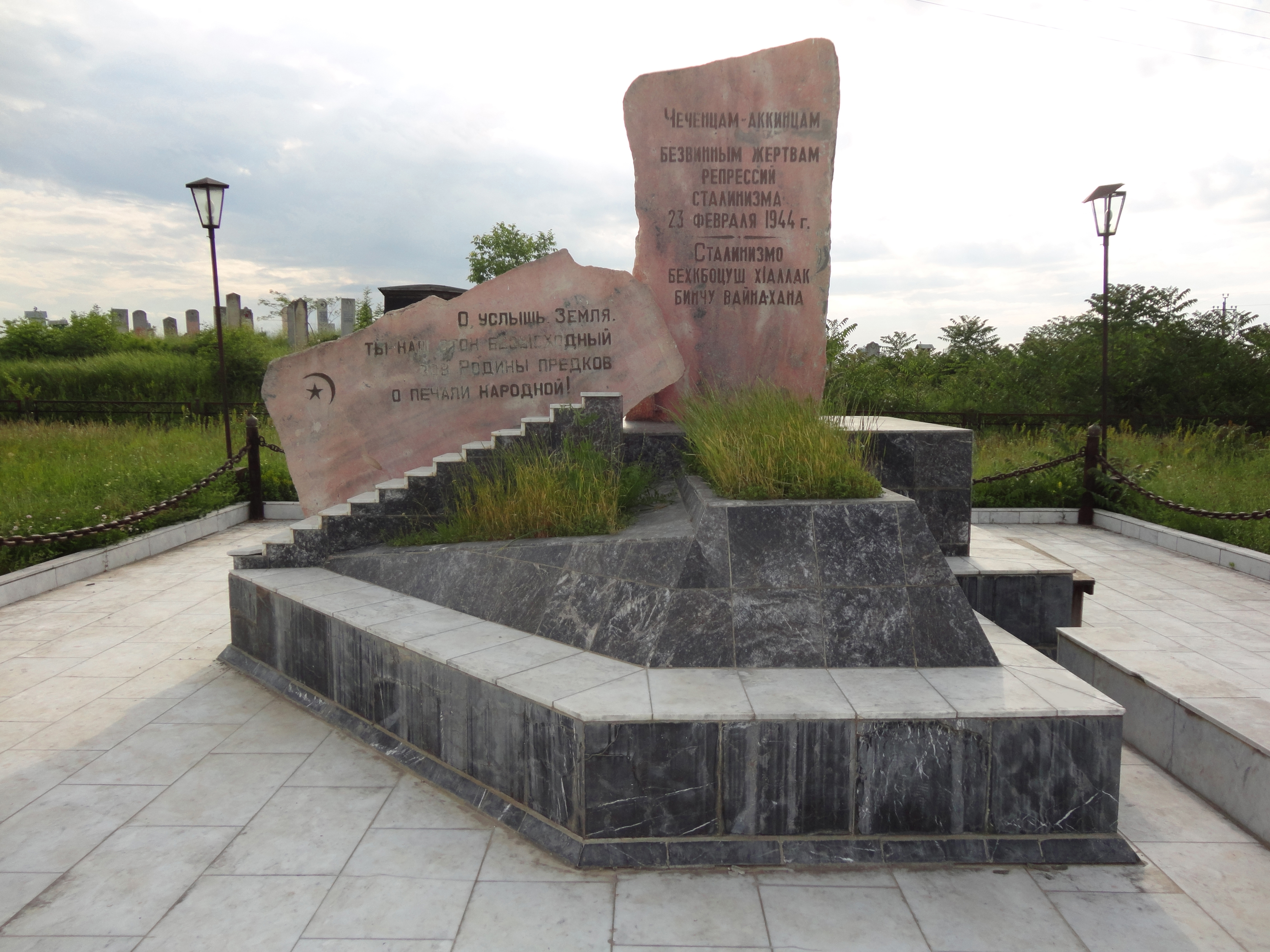
Monument to victims of Stalinism - Chechens

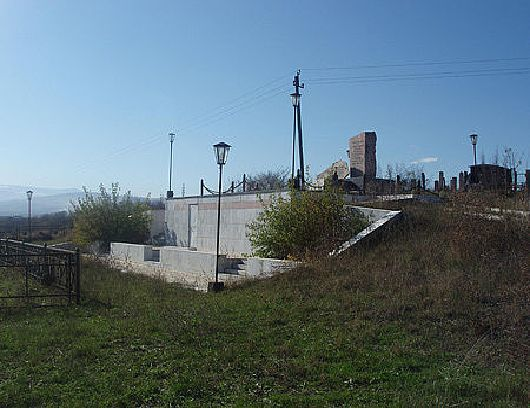
Monument to victims of Stalinism - Chechens

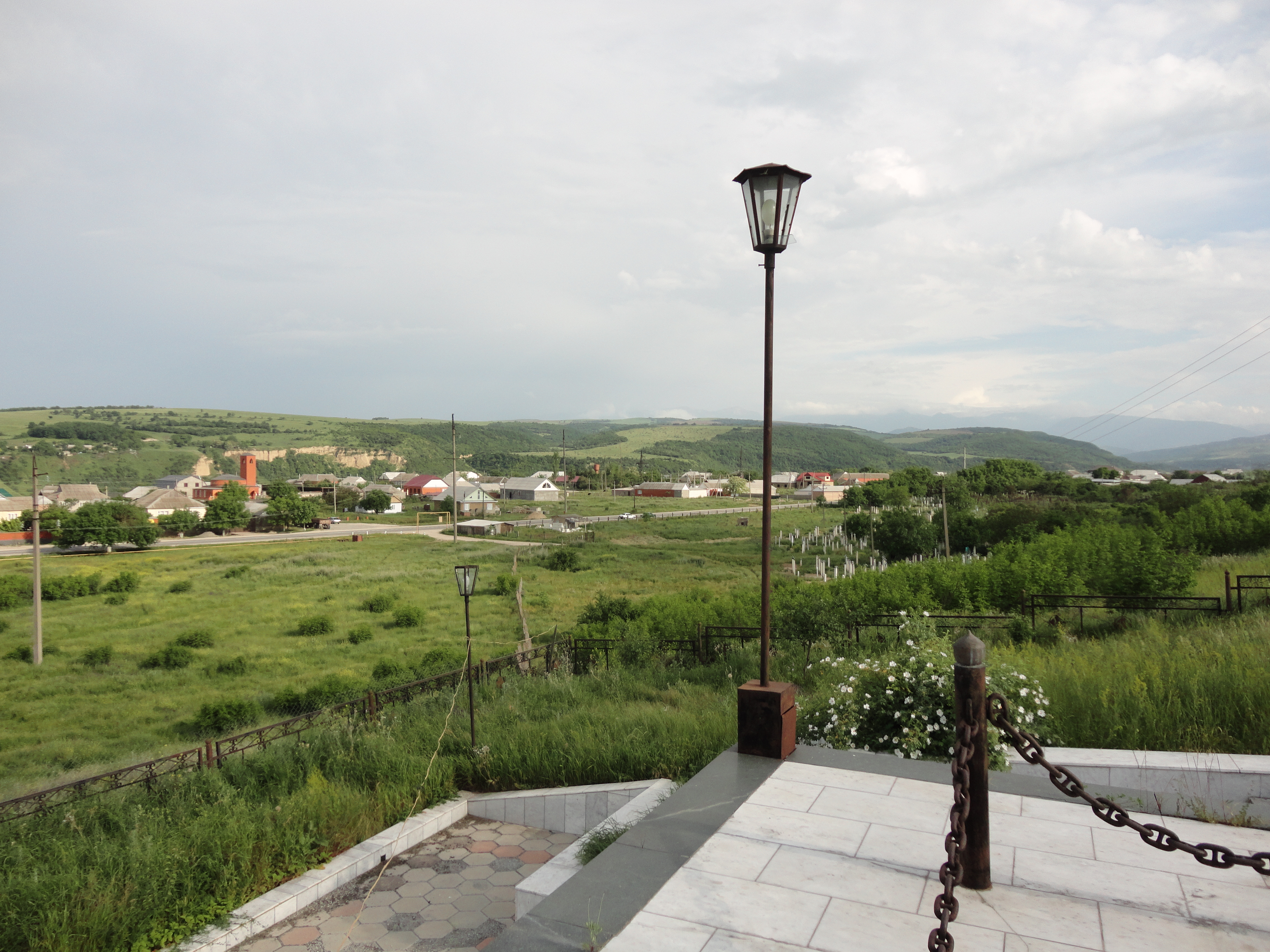
Monument to victims of Stalinism - Chechens

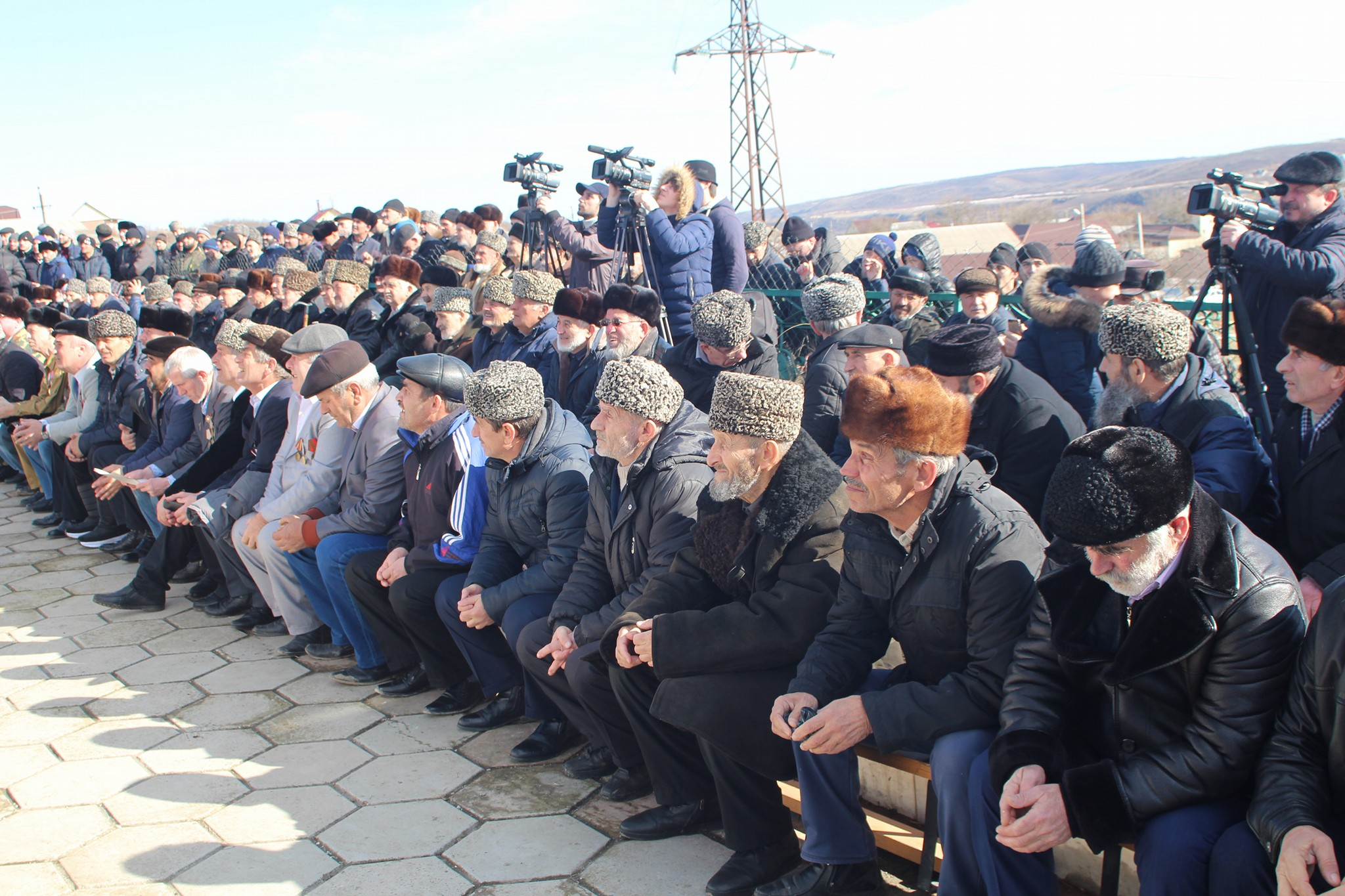
Rally of February 23, 2017 on the anniversary of the deportation

== Gallery ==
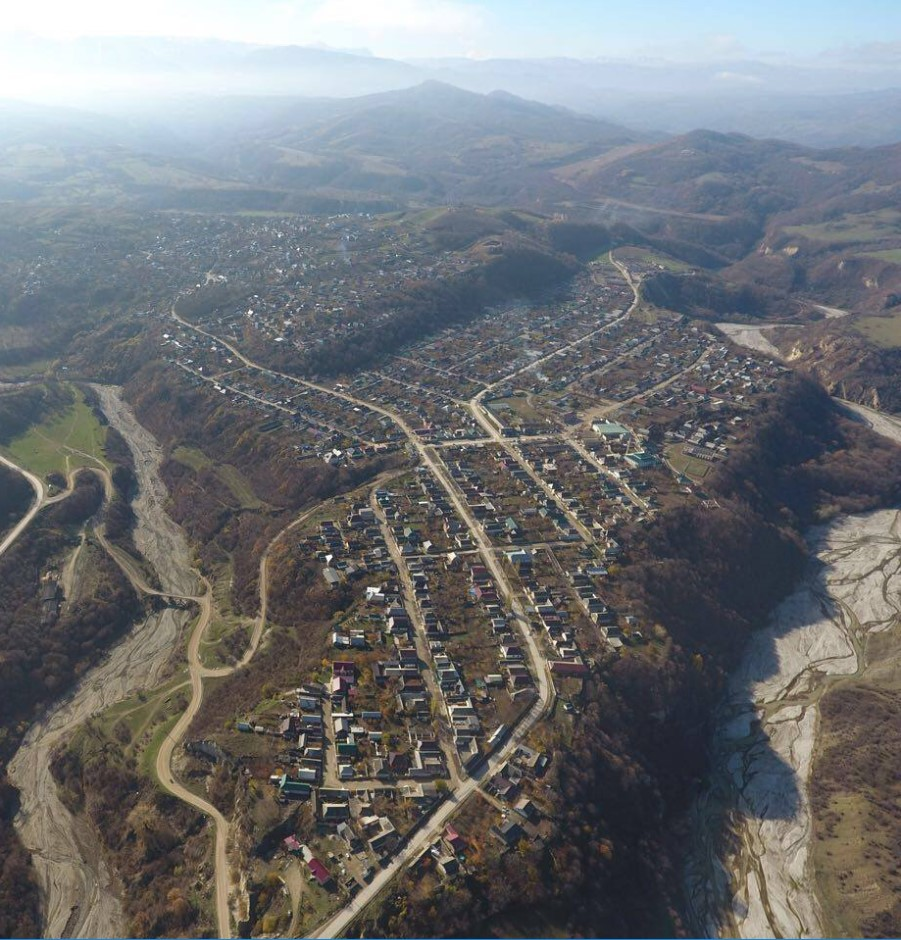
Yurt-Aukh

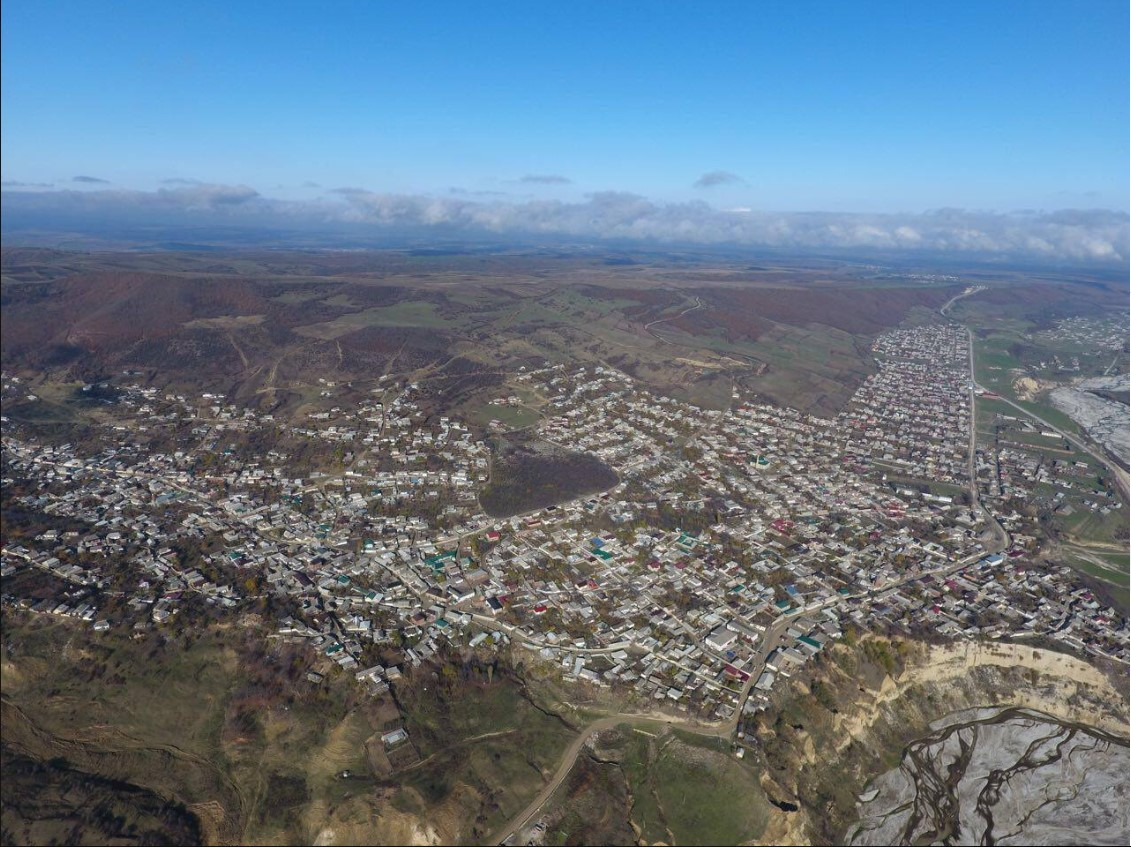
Aktash-Aukh

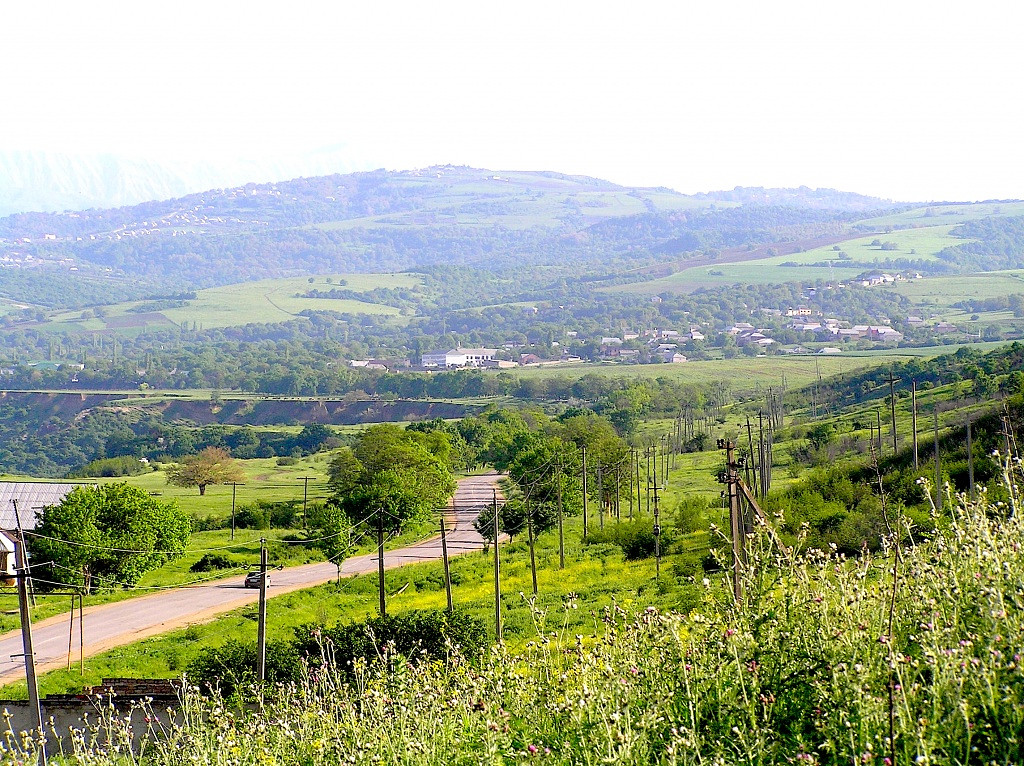
Yaryksu-Aukh

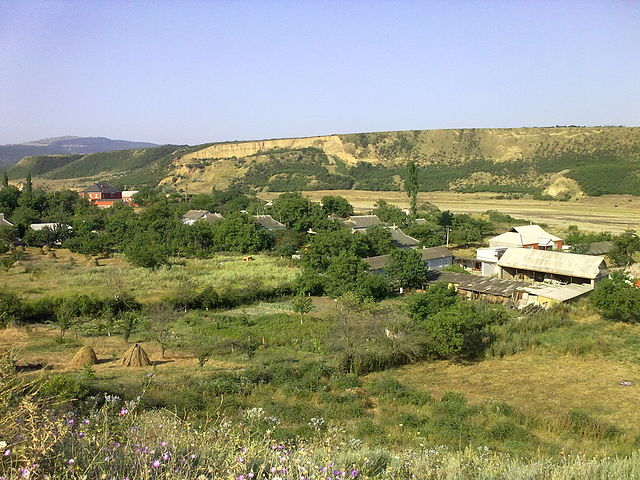
Zori-Otar

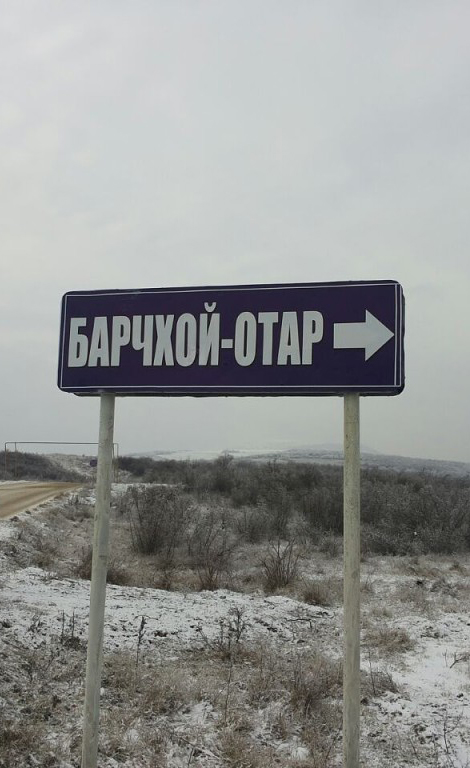
Barchkhoyotar=

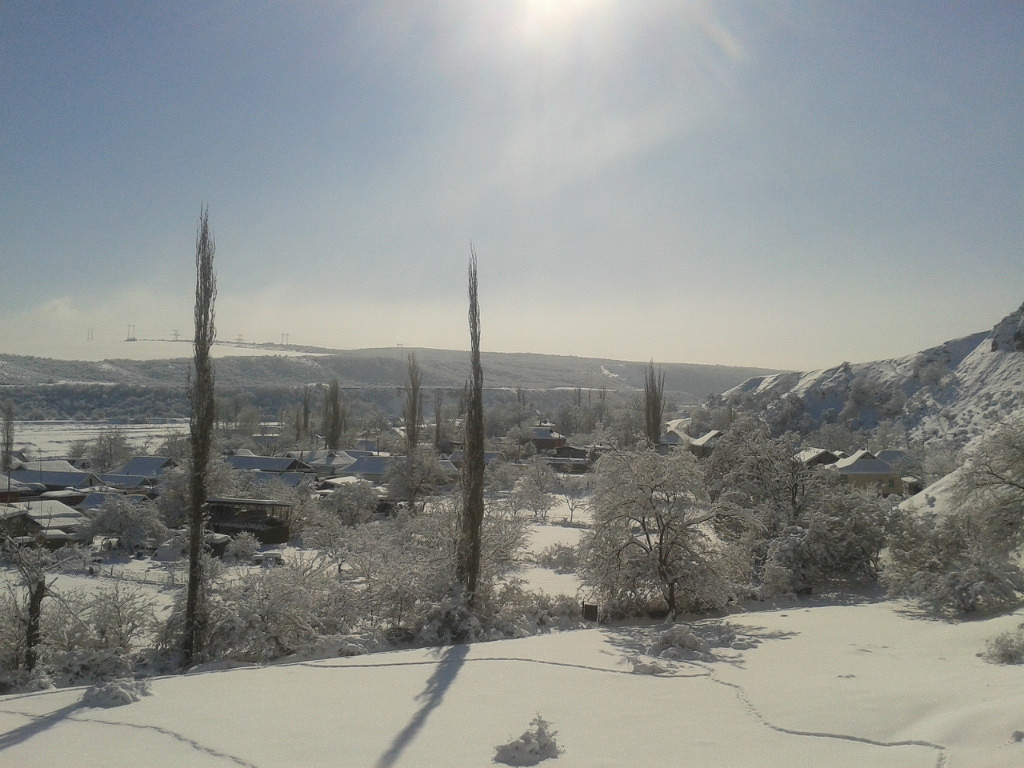
Winter in Altmarzayurt

== Literature ==
- Линевич И. П. (1872) [Сборникъ свѣдѣній о Кавказскихъ горцахъ]. "Карта горских народов, подвластных Шамилю (с примечаниями)". Сборник сведений о кавказских горцах. Тф.: Типография Главного Управления Наместника Кавказского.
- Лаудаев У. (1872) [Сборникъ свѣдѣній о Кавказскихъ горцахъ]. "Чеченское племя (с примечаниями)". Сборник сведений о кавказских горцах. Тф.: Типография Главного Управления Наместника Кавказского.
- Адиев А.З. (2016). "Конфликтный потенциал межэтнических отношений в Республике Дагестан" (PDF) (in Russian) (3) (Ойкумена ed.).
- Новицкий И.Я. (2011). Управление этнополитикой Северного Кавказа. Краснодар: Здравствуйте. ISBN 978-5-94945-030-7.
- Шнайдер В. Г. (2009). Советская национальная политика и народы Северного Кавказа в 1940 – 1950-е гг. Армавир.
- Ибрагимова З.Х. (2007). Мир чеченцев. XIX век. Москва: Пробел-2000. ISBN 978-5-98604-089-9.
- Ibragimova, Zarema Ch (2015). KAVKAZ – PRZESZŁOŚĆ – TERAŹNIEJSZOŚĆ – PRZYSZŁOŚĆ. Rzeszów. ISBN 978-5-98604-089-9.
- Чеченцы: история и современность. Москва: Мир дому твоему. 1996. ISBN 5-87553-005-7 – via Составление и общая редакция Ю.А. Айдаев.
- Антология (2006). Чеченская Республика и чеченцы. История и современность. Москва: Наука. ISBN 5-02-034016-2.
- Ахмадов Я. З. (2009). Очерк исторической географии и этнополитического развития Чечни в XVI-XVIII веках. Москва. ISBN 978-5-91821-013-0.
