= Leninaul (Nogaysky District) =

Leninaul Ленинаул
- Selo
- Location within Republic of Dagestan Location within Russia
- Coordinates: 44°11′N 46°01′E
- Country: Russia
- Region: Republic of Dagestan
- District: Nogaysky District
- Time zone: UTC+3:00

Leninaul (Russian: Ленинаул) is a rural locality (a selo) and the administrative centre of Arslanbekovsky Selsoviet, Nogaysky District, Republic of Dagestan, Russia. The population was 540 as of 2010. There are 8 streets.

== Geography ==
Leninaul is located 15 km northeast of Terekli-Mekteb (the district's administrative centre) by road. Kalininaul and Terekli-Mekteb are the nearest rural localities.

== Nationalities ==
Nogais live there.
