= Burtunay =

Burtunay Буртунай Буртина
- Selo
- Location within Republic of Dagestan Location within Russia
- Coordinates: 42°59′N 46°37′E
- Country: Russia
- Region: Republic of Dagestan
- District: Kazbekovsky District
- Time zone: UTC+3:00

Burtunay (Russian: Буртунай; Avar: Буртина) is a rural locality (a selo) in Kazbekovsky District, Republic of Dagestan, Russia. The population was 4,035 as of 2010. There are 18 streets.

== Nationalities ==
Avars live there.

== Famous residents ==
- Saygidpasha Umakhanov (statesman)
- Gadzhi Makhachev (statesman, Doctor of Law, Professor, Deputy of the State Duma of the Russian Federation)
- Adam Amirilayev (Deputy of the State Duma of the Russian Federation)

== Geography ==
Burtunay is located 13 km south of Dylym (the district's administrative centre) by road. Almak and Guni are the nearest rural localities.
