= Aukhovskoe Naibstvo =

Administrative unit of the Caucasian Imamate

- Imamate Province
- 1842–?
- Flag
- Capital: Keshana
- Demonym: Aukhs
- Historical era: Early modern period
Succeeded by
Russian Empire

Aukhovskoe Naibstvo was the administrative unit of the Caucasian Imamate, and later the Russian Empire. It was one of the naibdoms of the Chechen regions of the Imamate.

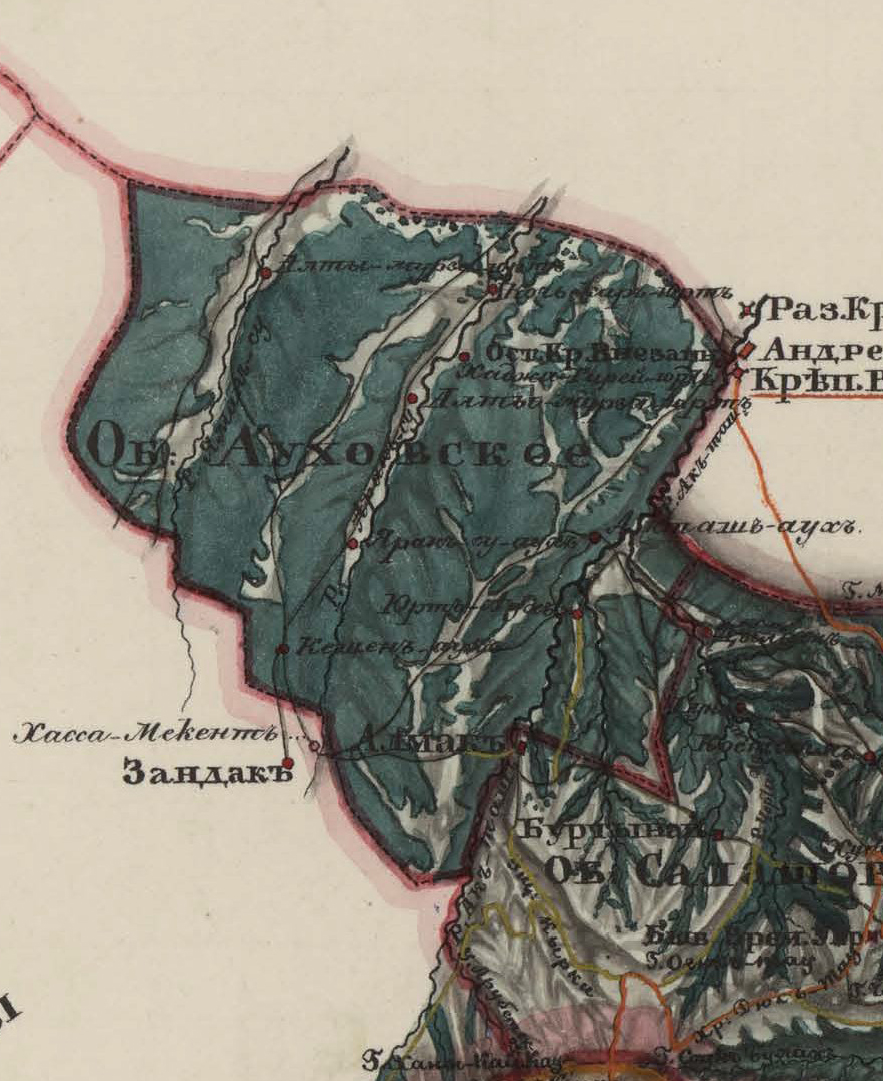
Map of the Aukhs Society (1841)

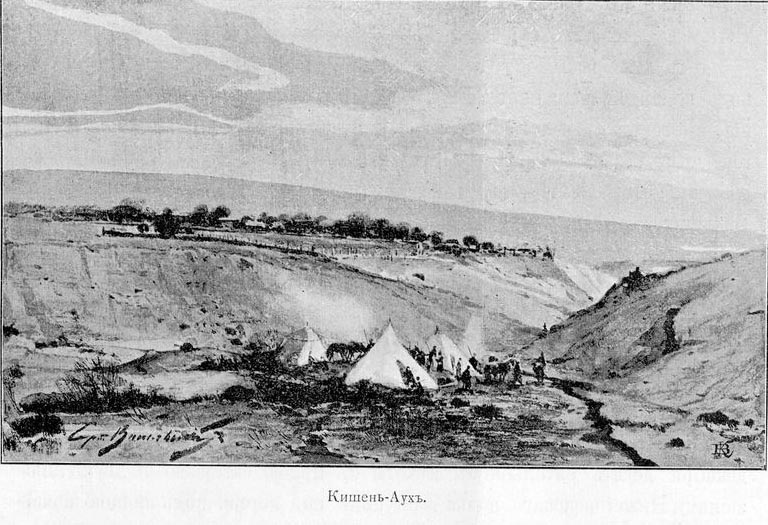
Russian troops camp near the Chechen village Keshen-Aukh

== History ==
=== Caucasian War ===
During the Caucasian War, Chechnya was divided by Imam Shamil into special districts, which were called naibstvo (Russian: наибство), which were part of the vilayets (regions). Each naibstvo, which consisted of several auls, with a round number of about 2000 households, was ruled by a naib. The naibs were appointed by Shamil himself and were elected from among the persons represented by the public to the imam. Under the naibs, there were detachments of murids, which were maintained at the expense of the inhabitants of the naibs. Qadis (judges, specialists in Islamic law) and foremen were elected by the people, however, at the suggestion of the naibs, they were approved in their positions by Shamil. The entire male population was divided into dozens, whose members were obliged to observe the behavior of each other and, in case of anything suspicious, they were required to immediately inform the naib of the district if the actions of someone harmed the imamate (country).

=== As a part of Russian Empire ===
Esadze wrote that in 1860 the Terek region was divided into 6 districts: Kabardian, Military-Ossetian, Chechen, Argun, Ichkerin and Kumyk and into two separate districts: Aukh and Salavat, which were temporarily assigned to the Kumyk district (1907). In Esadze's opinion, all these districts (naibdoms), established or transformed during the period of the most vigorous hostilities from 1857 to 1859, were of a temporary nature.

After the end of the Caucasian War, at the place of residence of the Aukhites, for some time there was an administrative unit - the Aukh District. On October 1, 1862, the Upland District of the Terek Region was formed, which included the Aukh, Salatov and Zandak districts.

== Settlements ==
Directly Aukhs:

- Aktash-Aukh
- Alburi-Otar
- Altmirza-Yurt
- Bilt-Aukh
- Keshen-Aukh
- Yaryksu-Aukh
- Yurt-Aukh, and others

Ichkeria settlements:

- Alleroy
- Benoy
- Bilty
- Engenoy
- Gendergen
- Mesket
- Sayasan
- Shuani
- Zandak, and others

== Naibs ==
- Tashaw-Hadji
- Bulat-Mirza, also was naib of Ichkeria. He replaced Tashev-Khadzhi.
- Goitemir of Aukh — (1844-1847, 1850-1853)
- Dzhamal
- Miklyk Murtazali from Chirkei. He was abolished from the office after getting top many complaints
- Idris-Efendi from Endirey (1847-1858), he replaced Miklyk Murtazali from Chirkeï.
- Ullubiy-mulla
- Khoza Mamayev
- Khatu Mamayev
- Muhammad from Ingushetia — Ingush Naib who also was the mufti of Ichkeria at one point.

== Gallery ==
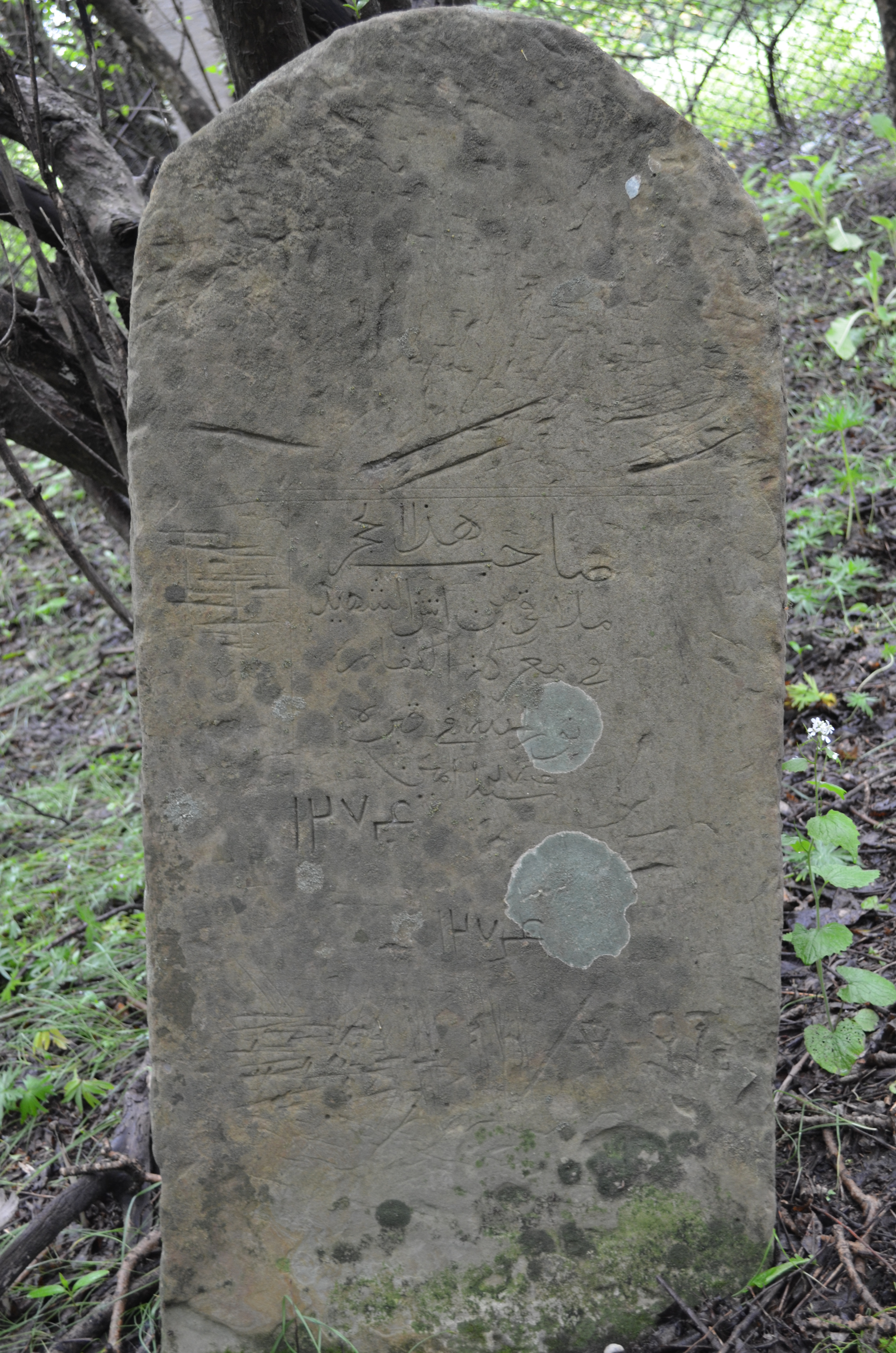
Mollakhi son of Atash- The grave of the warrior Imamat

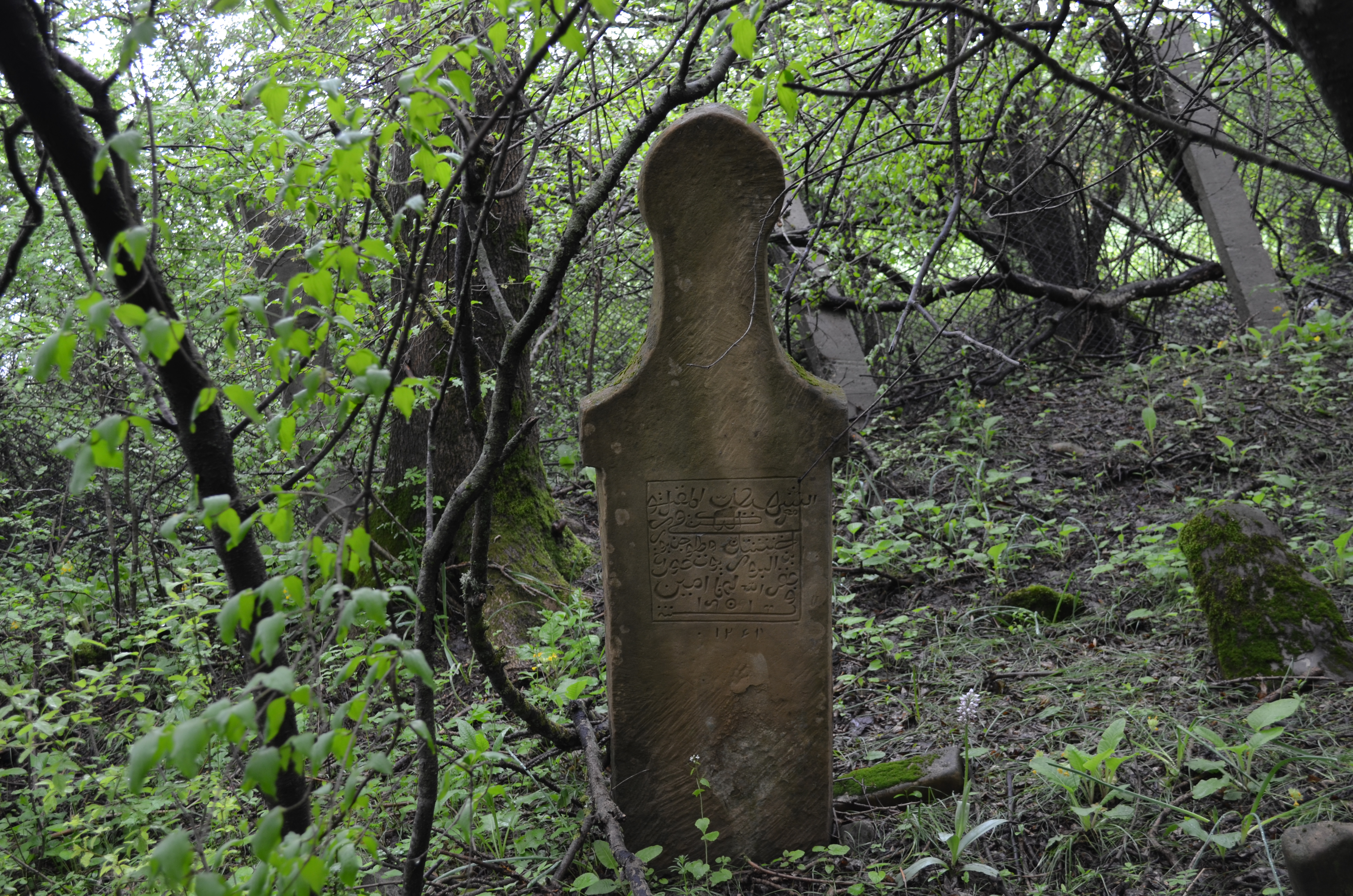
Gurash son of Alburi - The grave of the warrior Imamat

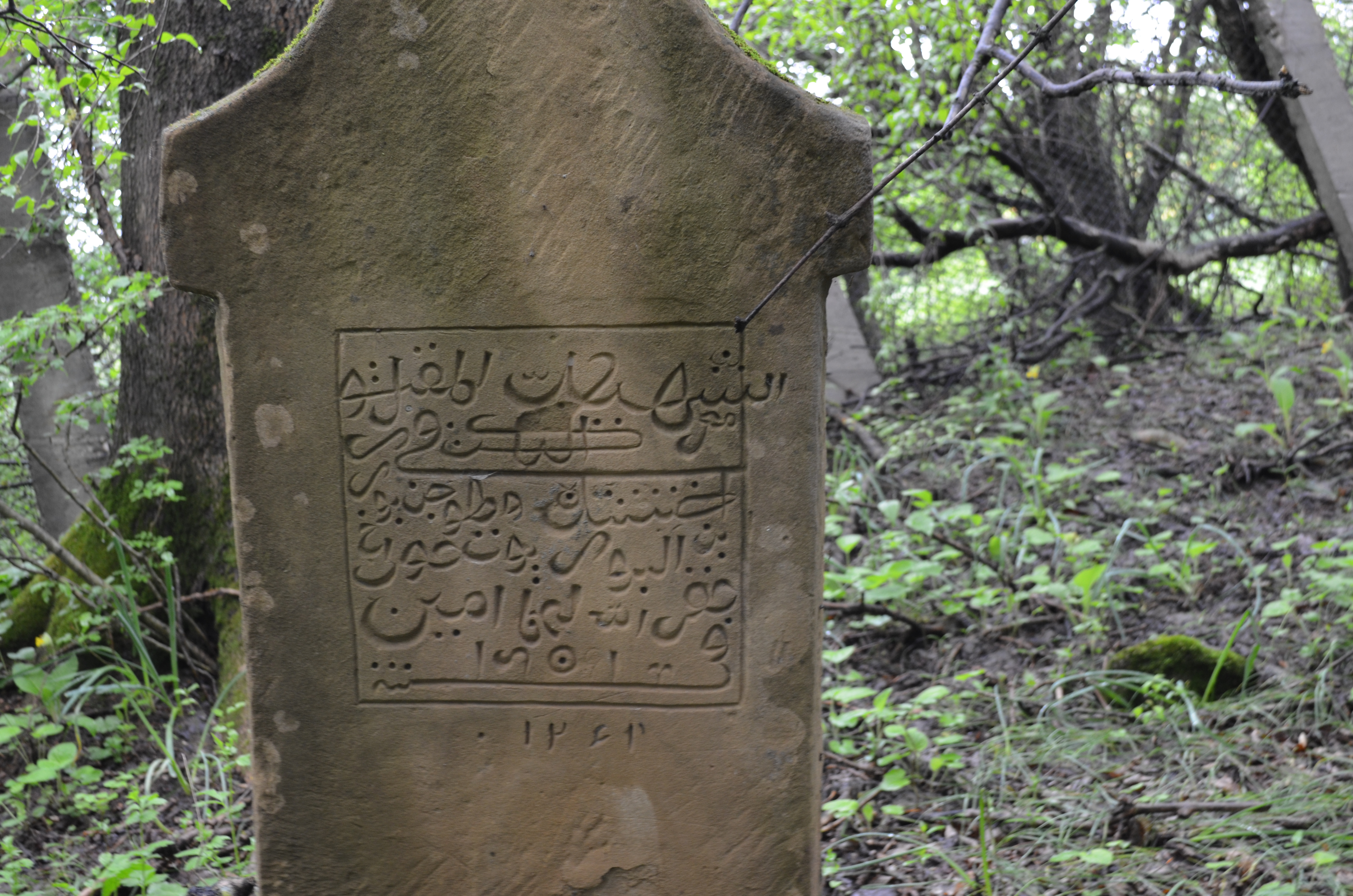
Jambura son of Alburi - The grave of the warrior Imamat

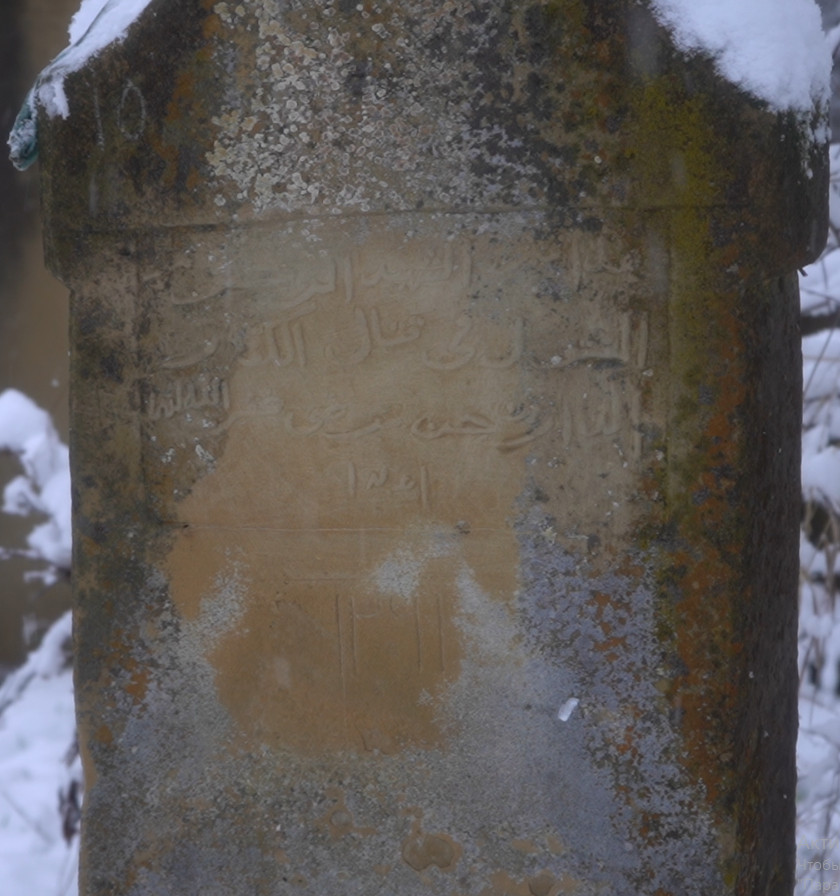
Eldar Naib Mechiga - The grave of the warrior Imamat

== See also ==
- Aukh
- Galashkinskoe Naibstvo

== Bibliography ==
- Саййд Абдурахман (1997). Шихсаидова, А. Р.; Омарова, Х. А.; Редакционная коллегия серии «Памятники письменности Дагестана» (eds.). Абдурахман из Газикумуха. Книга воспоминаний [Abdurahman from Gazikumukh. book of memories] (PDF) (in Russian). Translated by Саидова, М.-С. Махачкала: Дагестанское книжное издательство. pp. 1–237.
- Жданов, Ю. А., ed. (2005). Энциклопедия культур народов Юга России. Народы Юга России [Encyclopedia of cultures of the peoples of the South of Russia. Peoples of the South of Russia] (in Russian). Vol. 1. Ростов-на-Дону: СКНЦ ВШ. pp. 1–244. ISBN 5-87872-089-2.
- Ибрагимова, З. Х. (2007). Мир чеченцев. XIX век [World of Chechens. 19th century] (in Russian). Москва: Пробел-2000. pp. 1–386. ISBN 978-5-98604-089-9.
- Rzeszów (2013). Kavkaz – Przeszłość – Teraźniejszość – Przyszłość [Caucasus – Past – Present – Future] (in Polish). pp. 1–192.
- Дадаев, Ю. У. (2009). Наибы и мудиры Шамиля [Naibs and mudirs of Shamil] (in Russian). Махачкала: ДИНЭМ. pp. 1–621. ISBN 978-5-91446-011-9.
