= Dubki, Republic of Dagestan =

Dubki Дубки
- Urban-type settlement

Other transcription(s)
  - Avar: Дубки
- Interactive map of Dubki
- Location of Dubki Dubki (Republic of Dagestan)
- Coordinates: 43°02′N 46°50′E
- Country: Russia
- Federal subject: Dagestan
- Administrative district: Kazbekovsky District
- SettlementSelsoviet: Dubki Settlement
- Elevation: 860 m (2,820 ft)

Population (2010 Census)
  - Total: 5,202
  - Estimate (2025): 5,544 (+6.6%)

Administrative status
  - Capital of: Dubki Settlement

Municipal status
  - Municipal district: Kazbekovsky Municipal District
  - Urban settlement: Dubki Urban Settlement
  - Capital of: Dubki Urban Settlement
- Time zone: UTC+3 (MSK)
- Postal code: 368152
- OKTMO ID: 82622155051

Dubki population
- 2010 Census: 5,202
- 2002 Census: 5,208
- 1989 Census: 6,524
- 1979 Census: 7,179

Dubki (Russian: Дубки́; Avar: Дубки) is an urban locality (an urban-type settlement) in Kazbekovsky District of the Republic of Dagestan, Russia. As of the 2010 Census, its population was 5,202.

== Administrative and municipal status ==
Within the framework of administrative divisions, the urban-type settlement of Dubki is incorporated within Kazbekovsky District as Dubki Settlement (an administrative division of the district). As a municipal division, Dubki Settlement is incorporated within Kazbekovsky Municipal District as Dubki Urban Settlement.
