= Kalininaul, Kazbekovsky District, Republic of Dagestan =

Kalininaul Калининаул
- Selo

Other transcription(s)
  - Avar: Калининаул
  - Chechen: Ширча-Ӏовх, Ширча-Эвла, Şirça-Evla
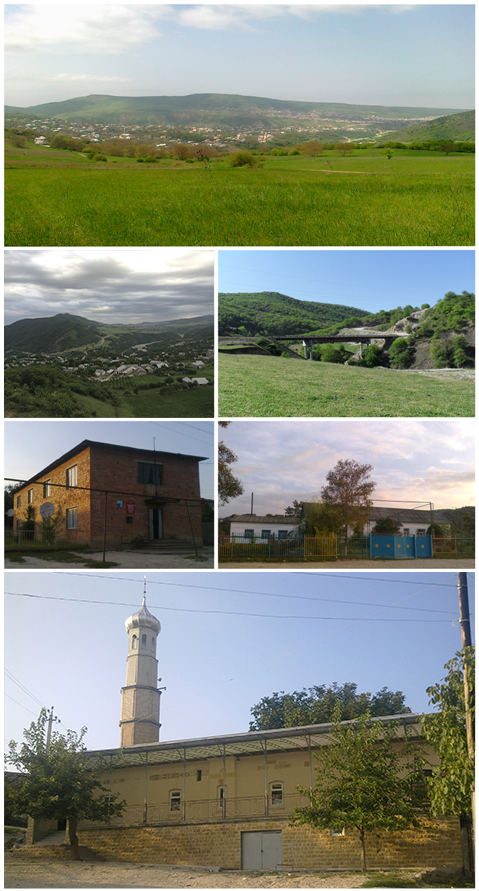
- Views of Kalininaul
- Interactive map of Kalininaul
- Location of Kalininaul Kalininaul (Republic of Dagestan)
- Coordinates: 43°04′15″N 46°34′02″E
- Country: Russia
- Federal subject: Dagestan
- Administrative district: Kazbekovsky District

Population (2010 Census)
  - Total: 4,531
  - Estimate (2025): 5,881 (+29.8%)
- Time zone: UTC+3 (MSK)
- Postal code: 368157
- OKTMO ID: 82622440101

Kalininaul (Russian: Калининаул, Chechen: Ширча-Ӏовх, until 1944 Yurt-Aukh, Russian: Юрт-Аух) is a rural locality (a selo) in Kazbekovsky District of the Republic of Dagestan, Russia, located on the right bank of the Aktash River, at the confluence with the Sala-su River, opposite the selo of Leninaul, 18 kilometers (11 mi) south of Khasavyurt on the border with the Chechen Republic. Population: 4,531 (2010 census); 4,439 (2002 census); predominantly Chechen.

== History ==
The oldest village of Chechens in the Terco-Sulak Meternrech. It was previously known as Shircha-Evla, Yurt-Evla, and Yurt-Aukh.

Yurt-Aukh, as it was then called, was until 1944 a part of the Aukh District. In 1944, during the deportation of Chechens to Central Asia, the locals were deported and Avars from the neighboring selo of Almak settled in their place.

In 1956, the Chechens were allowed to return to the Caucasus, but the local authorities prohibited their return directly to their ancestral villages in former Aukh District. Only several years later the Chechens were able to start buying back their houses from the Avars.

On August 27, 2007, a clash between over one hundred Chechens and Avars took place in Kalininaul, resulting in eight people injured.

== Infrastructure ==
An elementary and a secondary school operate in Kalininaul. There is also a House of Culture, a post office, a kindergarten, and four mosques (two Chechen and two Avar).

== Teips ==
The village is inhabited by the following chechen teips (clans):

- Akkoy
- Pkharckhoy
- Bittroy
- Chentiy
- Chontoy
- Shinroy
- Nokkhoy
- Veappiy

=== Mosque of the 20th century ===
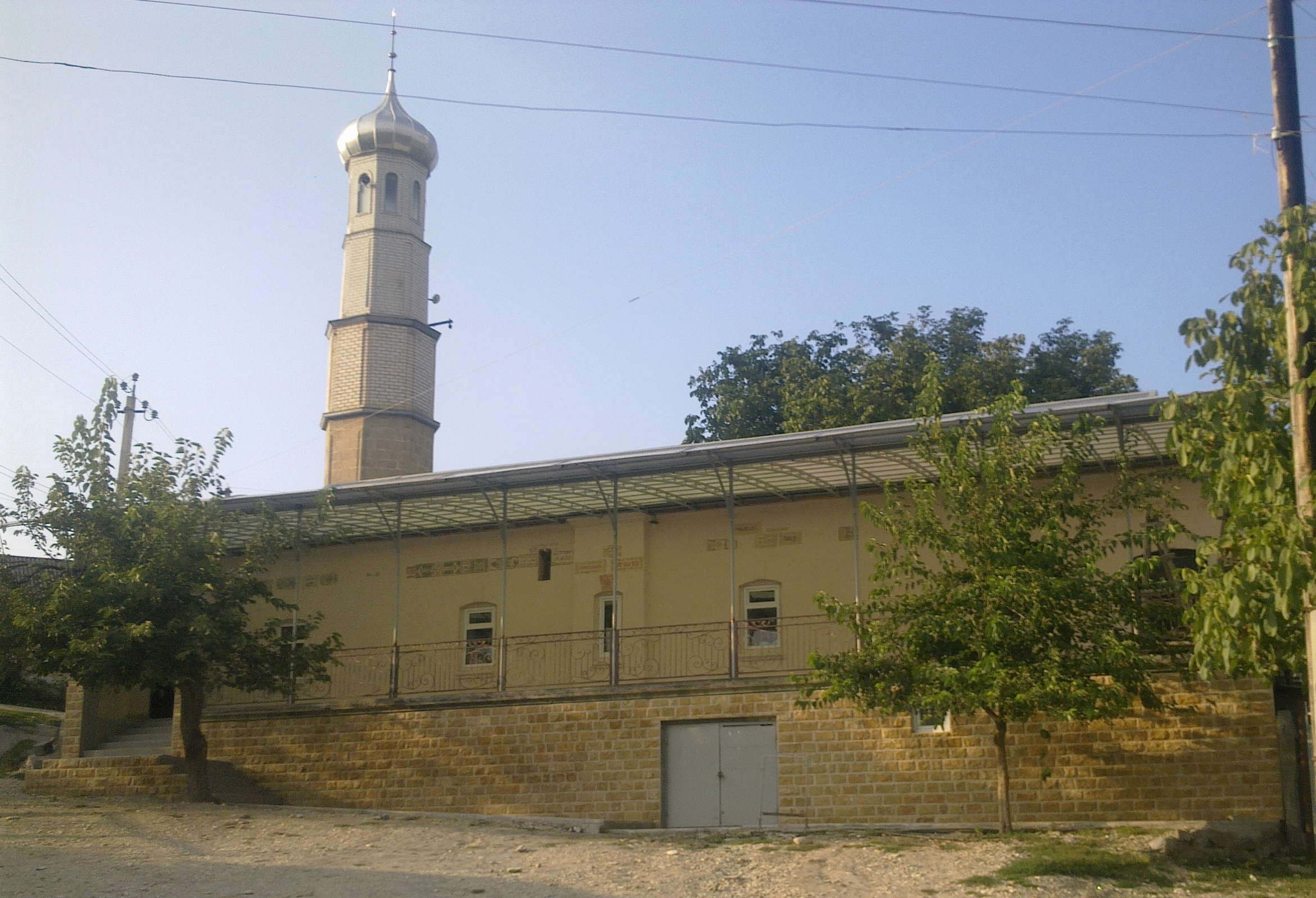
20th century mosque in the village of Yurt-Aukh

In the old center of the village there is a functioning "Mosque in Yurt-Aukh", built at the beginning of the 20th century, is an architectural monument of Aukha. According to the stories of old-timers of the village, the mosque was built on the site where there was a need for clay, a new one arose due to the fact that the population of the village increased, and the old mosque could no longer accommodate everyone who wanted to, when building the mosque, the villagers hired builders for a certain fee.

Brick blocks were made of large sand stones, which local residents brought from the foot of the mountain Gebek-Kale on carts, the stones were carried one by one by harnessed horses and processed. Lime mortar was used as a solution for binding the blocks-stones, the contents of chicken eggs were added to it, which greatly increased the adhesion of the microparticles of the solution, giving the structure the strength of the monolith of the mosque.

In honor of the villagers who made the most significant contributions, name blocks were made, painted with different patterns and carved with names in the Arabic alphabet. The mosque has two main entrances, above one of which is depicted a horse and a man killing a snake with a sabre, and on the second arch is the Star of David and a drawing of a lion.

== Literature ==
- Ахмадов, Я. З. (2009). Очерк исторической географии и этнополитического развития Чечни в XVI-XVIII веках. Москва. ISBN 978-5-91821-013-0.
