= Almak, Russia =

Almak Алмак Алмахъ
- Selo
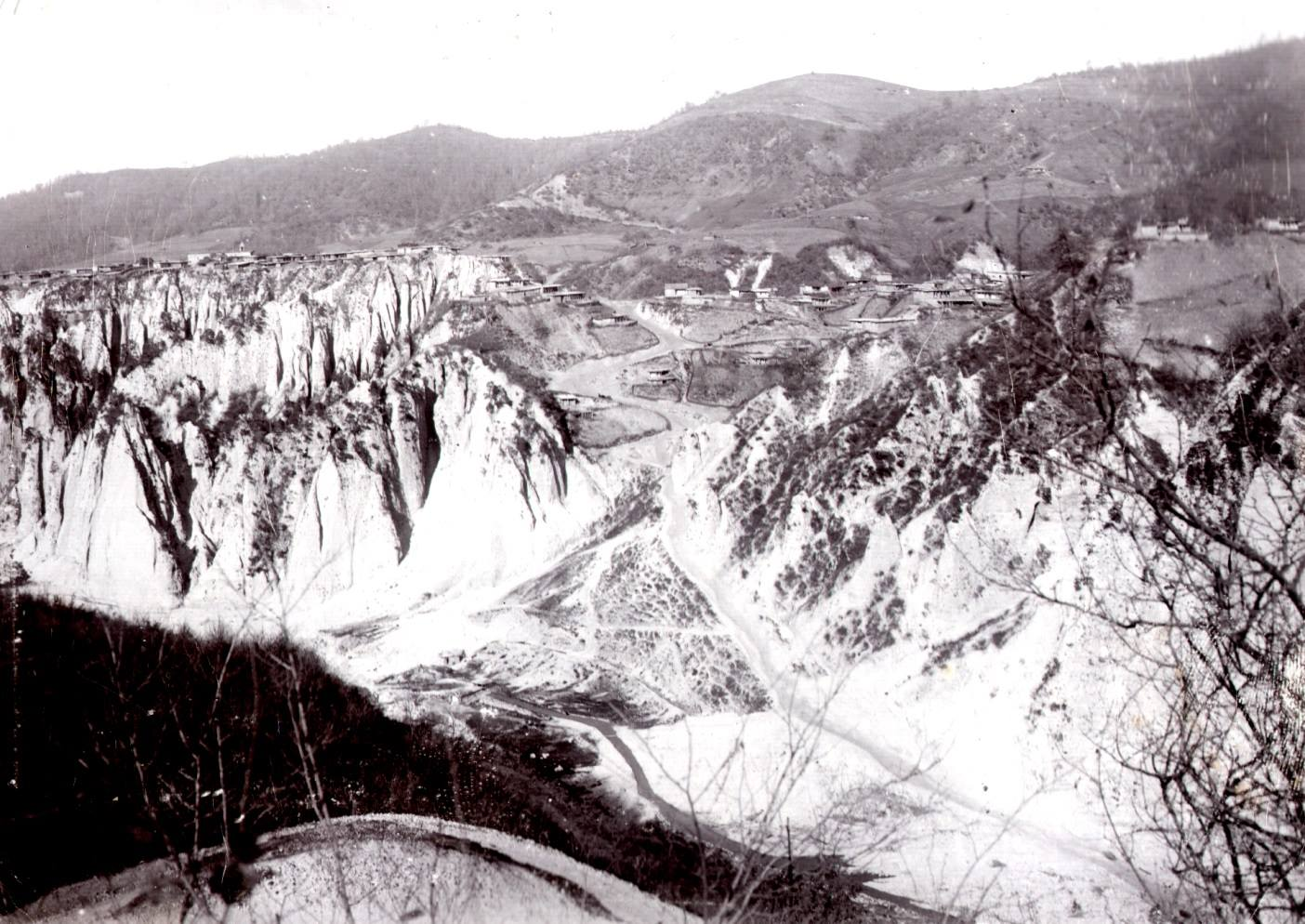
- Almak in 1905

- Location within Republic of Dagestan Location within Russia
- Coordinates: 42°59′N 46°34′E
- Country: Russia
- Region: Republic of Dagestan
- District: Kazbekovsky District
- Time zone: UTC+3:00

Almak (Russian: Алмак; Avar: Алмахъ) is a rural locality (a selo) in Kazbekovsky District, Republic of Dagestan, Russia. The population was 1,983 as of 2010. There are 40 streets.

== Geography ==
Almak is located on the right bank of the Aktash River, 20 km southwest of Dylym (the district's administrative centre) by road. Burtunay is the nearest rural locality.

== Nationalities ==
Avars live there.
