= Terekli-Mekteb =

Rural locality in Dagestan, Russia

Coordinates: 44°09′57″N 45°52′15″E

Terekli-Mekteb (Russian: Терекли-Мектеб, Nogai: Терекли-Мектеб) is a rural locality (a selo) and the administrative center of Nogaysky District of the Republic of Dagestan, Russia. Population: 7,993 (2010 census); 7,285 (2002 census); 5,327 (1989 Soviet census).

It was seized by German forces on 25 August 1942, making it the further most point that Nazi Germany advanced, before being retaken by the Soviets in early September. On 6 November, the Germans bombed the selo. It was retaken in January 1943.
