= Nogaysky District, Dagestan =

Nogaysky District Ногайский район (Russian)
- District

Other transcription(s)
  - Nogay: Ногай районы
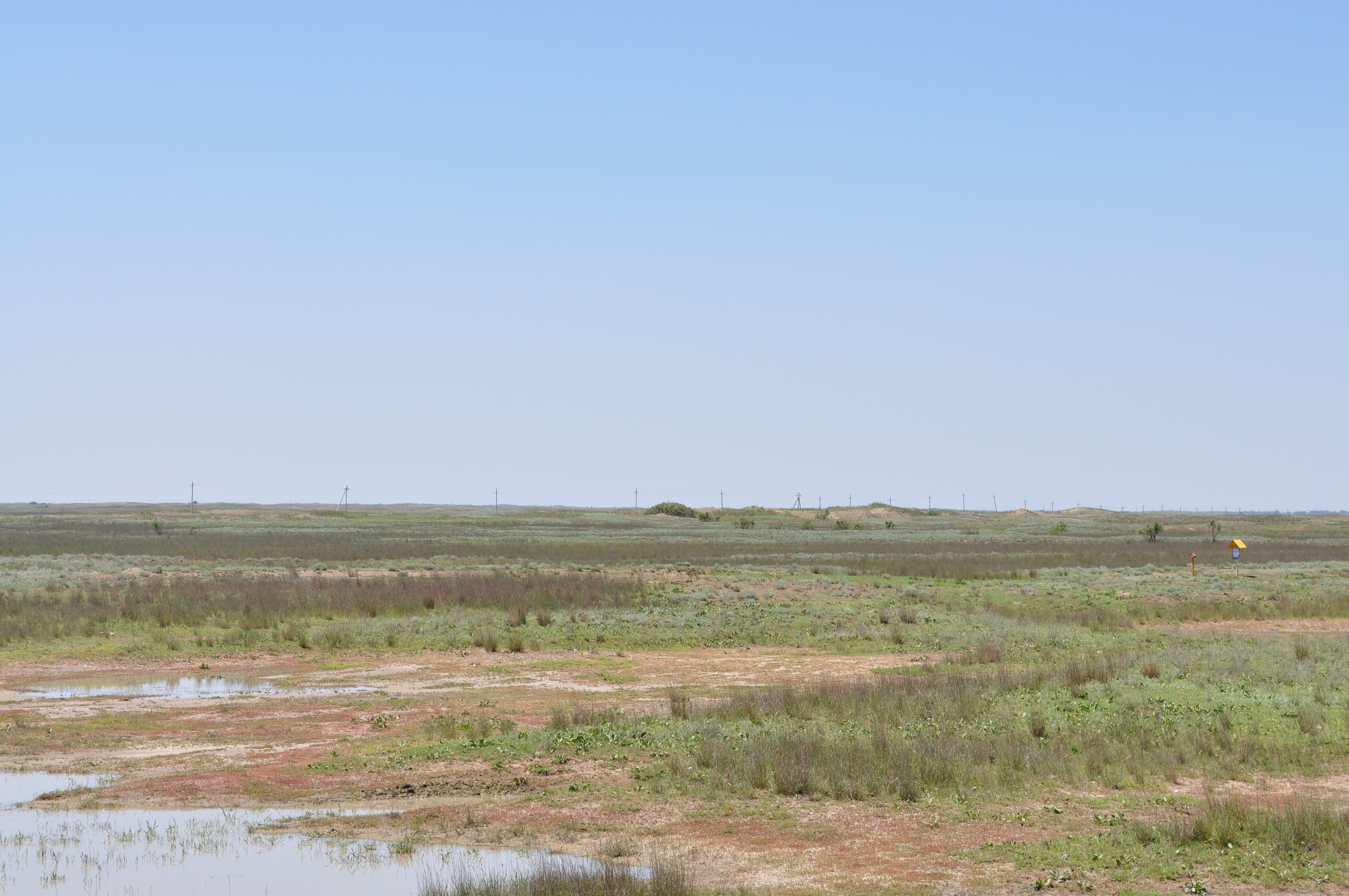
- Nogay Reserve, Nogaysky District

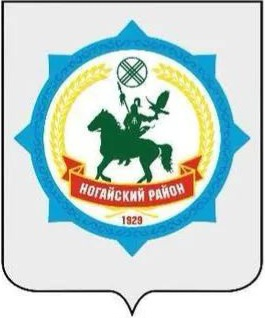
- Coat of arms
- Location of Nogaysky District in the Republic of Dagestan
- Coordinates: 44°10′N 45°52′E
- Country: Russia
- Federal subject: Republic of Dagestan
- Established: 22 November 1928
- Administrative center: Terekli-Mekteb

Area
  - Total: 9,000 km^{2} (3,500 sq mi)

Population (2010 Census)
  - Total: 22,472
  - Density: 2.5/km^{2} (6.5/sq mi)
  - Urban: 0%
  - Rural: 100%

Administrative structure
  - Administrative divisions: 5 Selsoviets
  - Inhabited localities: 17 rural localities

Municipal structure
  - Municipally incorporated as: Nogaysky Municipal District
  - Municipal divisions: 0 urban settlements, 10 rural settlements
- Time zone: UTC+3 (MSK)
- OKTMO ID: 82640000
- Website: http://nogaysky.ru

Population of Nogaysky District
- 2010 Census: 22,472
- 2002 Census: 21,685
- 1989 Census: 17,663
- 1979 Census: 17,056

Nogaysky District (Russian: Нога́йский райо́н; Nogai: Ногай районы, Nogay rayonı) is an administrative and municipal district (raion), one of the forty-one in the Republic of Dagestan, Russia. It is named after the members of the Karanogay or Qara-Nogai ethnicity who live in the district. Nogaysky District is located in the north of Dagestan. The area of the district is 9,000 square kilometers (3,500 sq mi). Its administrative center is the rural locality (a selo) of Terekli-Mekteb. As of the 2010 Census, the total population of the district was 22,472, with the population of Terekli-Mekteb accounting for 35.6% of that number.

The raion is roughly rectangular and lies at the northwest corner of Dagestan. Although most of Dagestan is mountainous, the raion is mostly dry steppe. On the east the Tarumovsky District separates it from the Caspian Sea. To the south is Chechnya, to the west is Stavropol Krai and to the north is Kalmykia. By the 2010 census the population was 22,472, of which 87.0% were Nogais, 8.1% Dargins, 1.0% Russians, 0.9% Chechens, 0.5% Kazakhs, 0.4% Kumyks, 0.2% Tatars, 0.2% Avars, 0.1% Laks and 0.1% Kabardians. The same census reported 103,660 Nogais in the Russian federation. These are the remnants of the once-great Nogai Horde. It was founded in 1928, transferred to Stavropol Krai in 1938 and returned to Dagestan in 1957. In 1966 the name was changed from Karanogai to Nogai.

== Administrative and municipal status ==
Within the framework of administrative divisions, Nogaysky District is one of the forty-one in the Republic of Dagestan. The district is divided into five selsoviets which comprise seventeen rural localities. As a municipal division, the district is incorporated as Nogaysky Municipal District. Its five selsoviets are incorporated as ten rural settlements within the municipal district. The selo of Terekli-Mekteb serves as the administrative center of both the administrative and municipal district.
