= Dylym =

Rural locality in Dagestan, Russia

Coordinates: 43°04′10″N 46°38′12″E

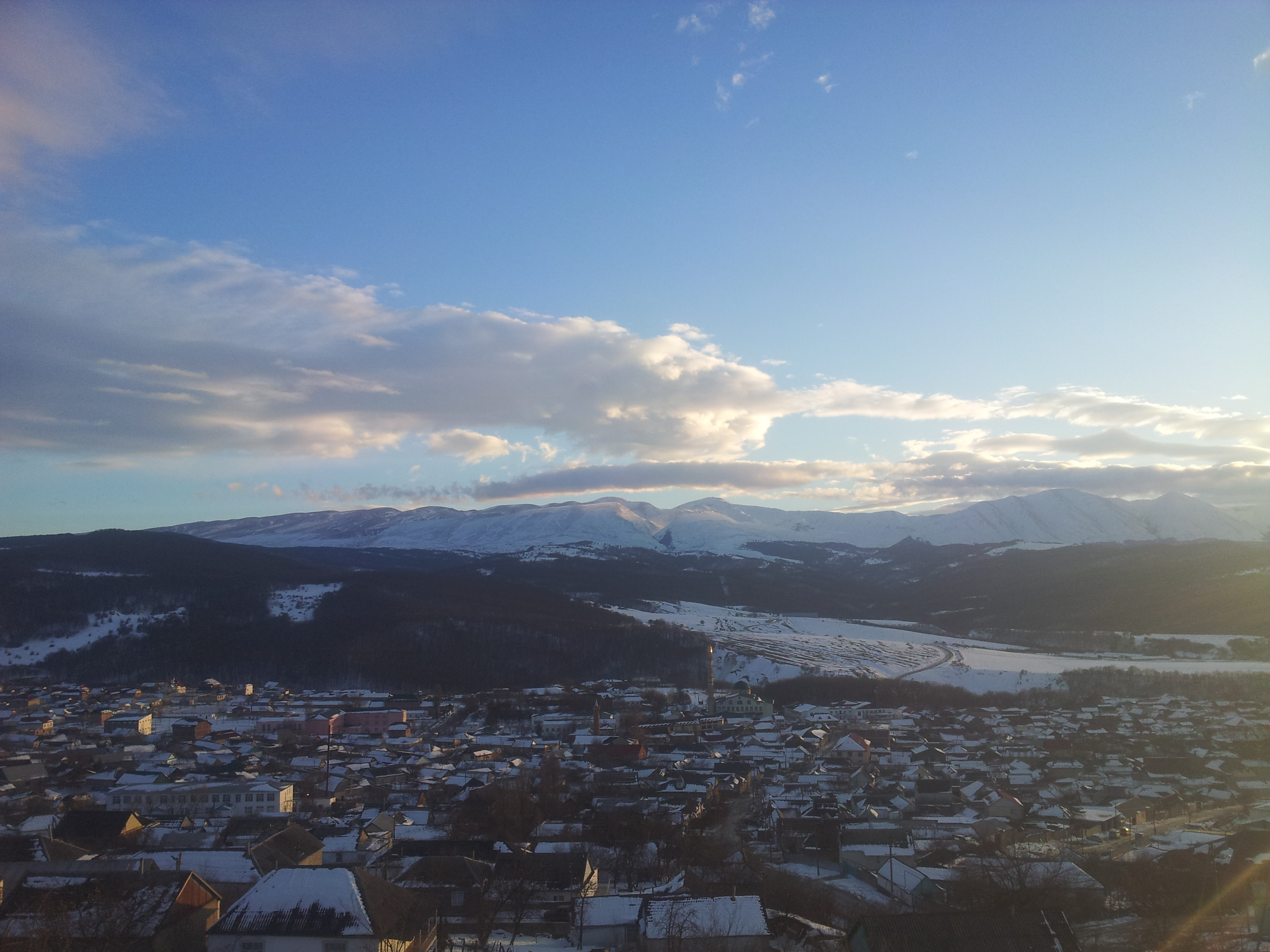
General view of the municipality

Dylym (Russian: Дылым, Avar: Дилим) is a rural locality (a selo) and the administrative center of Kazbekovsky District of the Republic of Dagestan, Russia. Population: 8,640 (2010 census); 7,537 (2002 census); 5,110 (1989 Soviet census).
