= Kazbekovsky District =

District in Dagestan, Russia

Kazbekovsky District Казбековский район (Russian)
- District

Other transcription(s)
  - Avar: Казбек район
  - Chechen: Казбековн кIошт
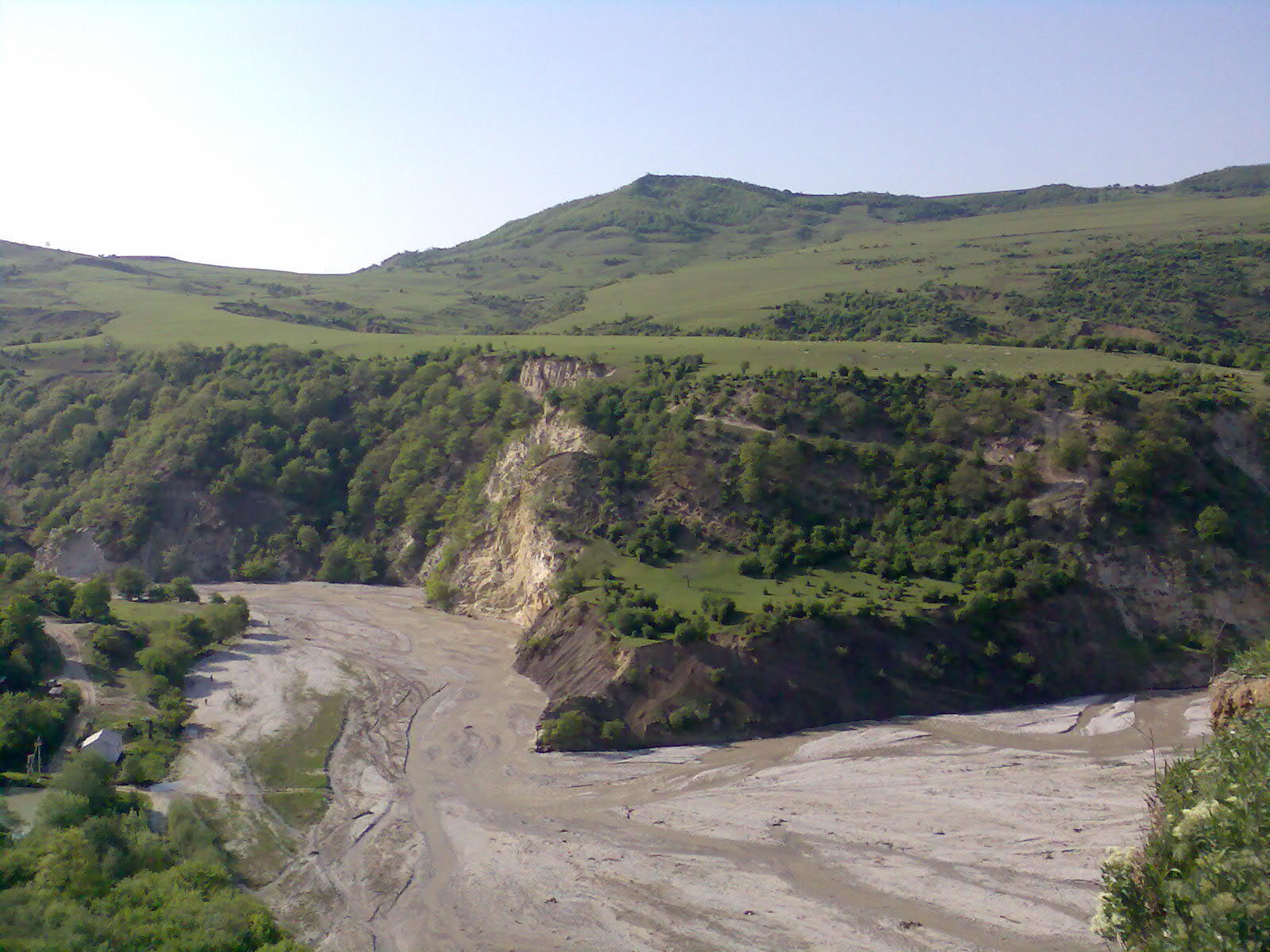
- The Aktash River near the selo of Kalininaul in Kazbekovsky District

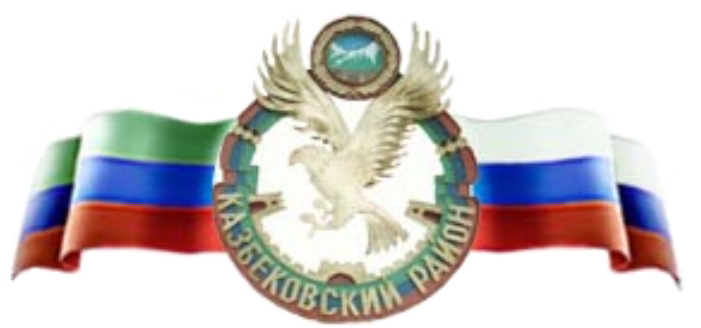
- Coat of arms
- Location of Kazbekovsky District in the Republic of Dagestan
- Coordinates: 43°04′N 46°38′E
- Country: Russia
- Federal subject: Republic of Dagestan
- Established: 1928
- Administrative center: Dylym

Area
  - Total: 723 km^{2} (279 sq mi)

Population (2010 Census)
  - Total: 42,752
  - Density: 59.1/km^{2} (153/sq mi)
  - Urban: 12.2%
  - Rural: 87.8%

Administrative structure
  - Administrative divisions: 1 Settlements, 3 Selsoviets
  - Inhabited localities: 1 urban-type settlements, 15 rural localities

Municipal structure
  - Municipally incorporated as: Kazbekovsky Municipal District
  - Municipal divisions: 1 urban settlements, 11 rural settlements
- Time zone: UTC+3 (MSK)
- OKTMO ID: 82622000
- Website: http://www.kazbekovskiy.ru

Population of Kazbekovsky District
- 2010 Census: 42,752
- 2002 Census: 33,140
- 1989 Census: 22,317
- 1979 Census: 19,395

Kazbekovsky District (Russian: Казбе́ковский райо́н) is an administrative and municipal district (raion), one of the forty-one in the Republic of Dagestan, Russia. It is located in the west of the republic. The area of the district is 723 square kilometers (279 sq mi). Its administrative center is the rural locality (a selo) of Dylym. As of the 2010 Census, the total population of the district was 42,752, with the population of Dylym accounting for 20.2% of that number.

== Geography ==
The district is in rugged terrain in the forested foothills of Degestan, 50 km west of the Caspian Sea. The average height is 500 to 1,000 meters above sea level, with higher elevations reaching 1,900 meters. There are many river valleys, canyons, and gulleys cutting the landscape with fast-moving streams. The largest river, the Aktash River, flows from southeast to northwest through the district.

== Administrative and municipal status ==
Within the framework of administrative divisions, Kazbekovsky District is one of the forty-one in the Republic of Dagestan. It is divided into one settlement (an administrative division with the administrative center in the urban-type settlement (an inhabited locality) of Dubki) and three selsoviets, which comprise fifteen rural localities. As a municipal division, the district is incorporated as Kazbekovsky Municipal District. The settlement is incorporated as an urban settlement, and the three selsoviets are incorporated as eleven rural settlements within the municipal district. The selo of Dylym serves as the administrative center of both the administrative and municipal district.
