= Usug =

Usug Усуг Усугъ
- Selo
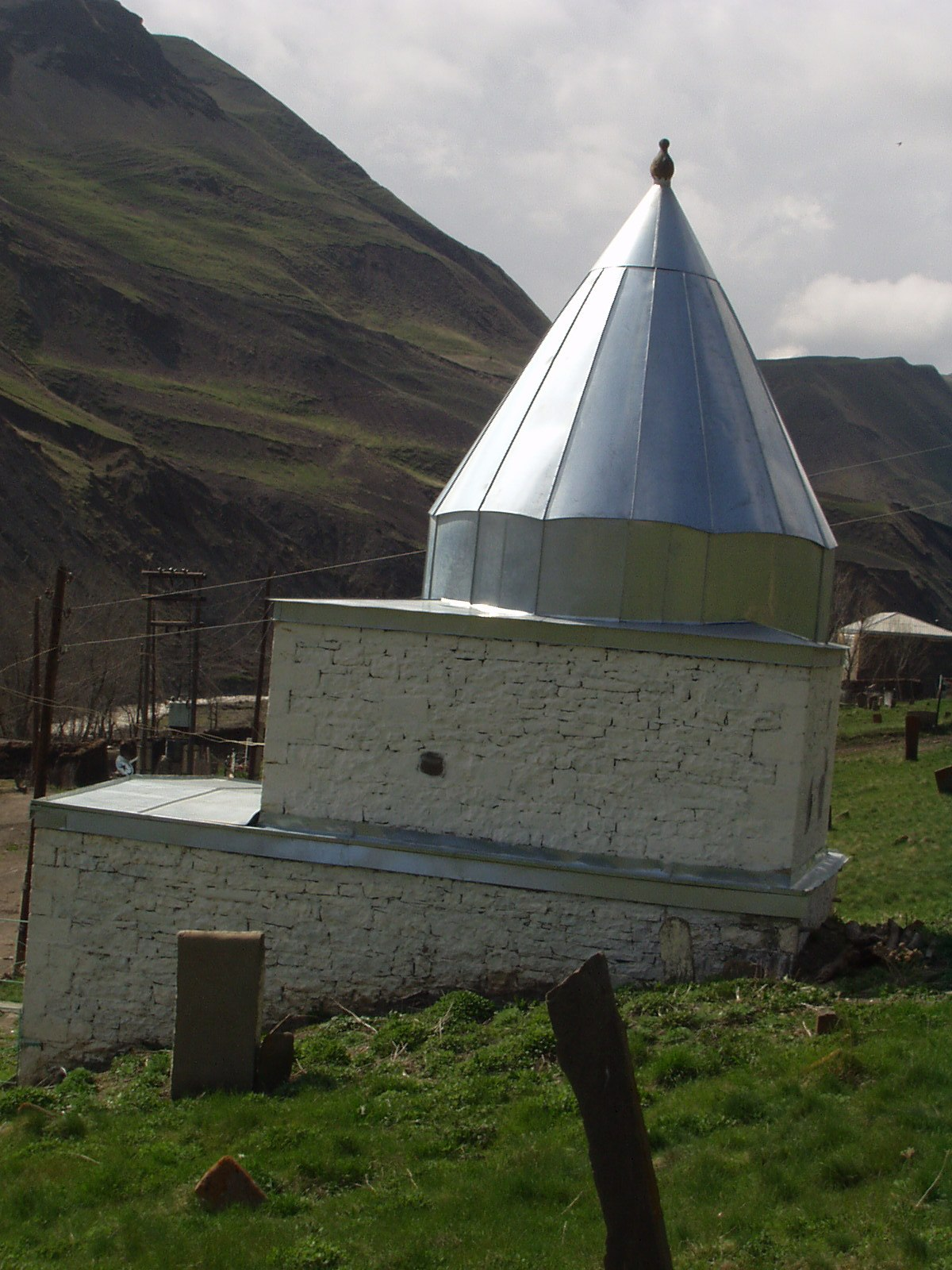
- A photo of a building in Usug

- Location within Republic of Dagestan Location within Russia
- Coordinates: 41°40′N 47°35′E
- Country: Russia
- Region: Republic of Dagestan
- District: Kurakhsky District
- Time zone: UTC+3:00

Usug (Aghul: Усугъ /uˈsuh/; Lezgian: Усар, Russian: Усуг) is a rural locality (a selo) and the administrative centre of Usugsky Selsoviet, Kurakhsky District, Republic of Dagestan, Russia. The population was 314 as of 2010. There are 4 streets.

== Geography ==
Usug is located 19 km northwest of Kurakh (the district's administrative centre) by road and 15 km southeast of Richa village in the valley of Aqarletsw river. Gelkhen and Kvardal are the nearest rural localities.

== Nationalities ==
Aghul people live there. The majority of villagers are part of eight families called tukhums. Previously in early historical periods each tukhum occupied certain area or neighborhood of village, but in recent times mixing of occupied areas happened has happened. Families of Usug village: Tariqkhar (Тарихъар), Ibayar (Ибаяр), 'alirar (ГӀалирар), Maharamar (Магьарамар), Kattirar (Каттирар), Tyurkiyar (Туьркийар), Ta'liyar (ТӀагӀлийар), 'arabar (ГӀарабар).

== Demographics ==
Population
| 1926 | 1939 | 1970 | 1989 | 2002 | 2010 |
|---|---|---|---|---|---|
| 405 | ↗480 | ↗502 | ↘288 | ↗299 | ↗314 |

== Language ==
People of Usug village speaks in Keren (Richa) dialect of Aghul language. Together with villages Kvardal, Ukuz and Xveredzh they form Usug speech of Keren dialect which slightly differs from Bedyuk and Richa speeches.
