= Khveredzh =

Khveredzh Хвередж Хоредж
- Selo
- Location within Republic of Dagestan Location within Russia
- Coordinates: 41°42′N 47°34′E
- Country: Russia
- Region: Republic of Dagestan
- District: Kurakhsky District
- Time zone: UTC+3:00

Khveredzh (Russian: Хвередж; Aghul: Хоредж) is a rural locality (a selo) in Usugsky Selsoviet, Kurakhsky District, Republic of Dagestan, Russia. The population was 243 as of 2010. There are three streets.

== Geography ==
Khveredzh is located 26 kilometres (16 mi) northwest of Kurakh (the district's administrative centre) by road. Usug and Gelkhen are the nearest rural localities.

== Nationalities ==
Aghul people live there.
