= Kumuk, Republic of Dagestan =

Kumuk Кумук Кумухъ
- Selo
- Location within Republic of Dagestan Location within Russia
- Coordinates: 41°50′N 48°25′E
- Country: Russia
- Region: Republic of Dagestan
- District: Kurakhsky District
- Time zone: UTC+3:00

Kumuk (Russian: Кумук; Lezgian: Кумухъ) is a rural locality (a selo) in Kurakhsky District, Republic of Dagestan, Russia. The population was 1,167 as of 2010. There are 22 streets.

== Geography ==
Kumuk is located 11 km southeast of Kurakh (the district's administrative centre) by road, on the Gulgerychay River. Kukaz and Shtul are the nearest rural localities.

== Nationalities ==
Lezgins live there.
