= Kukvaz =

Kukvaz Кукваз
- Selo
- Location within Republic of Dagestan Location within Russia
- Coordinates: 41°35′N 47°42′E
- Country: Russia
- Region: Republic of Dagestan
- District: Kurakhsky District
- Time zone: UTC+3:00

Kukvaz (Russian: Кукваз) is a rural locality (a selo) in Asharsky Selsoviet, Kurakhsky District, Republic of Dagestan, Russia. The population was 182 as of 2010. There are 3 streets.

== Geography ==
Kukvaz is located 8 km northwest of Kurakh (the district's administrative centre) by road. Ashar and Kurakh are the nearest rural localities.

== Nationalities ==
Lezgins live there.
