= Kochkhyur =

Kochkhyur Кочхюр Куьчхуьр
- Selo
- Location within Republic of Dagestan Location within Russia
- Coordinates: 41°31′N 47°51′E
- Country: Russia
- Region: Republic of Dagestan
- District: Kurakhsky District
- Time zone: UTC+3:00

Kochkhyur (Russian: Кочхюр; Lezgian: Куьчхуьр) is a rural locality (a selo) and the administrative centre of Kochkhyursky Selsoviet, Kurakhsky District, Republic of Dagestan, Russia. The population was 806 as of 2010.

== Nationalities ==
Lezgins live there.

== Geography ==
Kochkhyur is located 16 km southeast from Kurakh (the district's administrative centre) by road. Shtul and Kutul are the nearest rural localities.
