= Bakhtsug =

Bakhtsug Бахцуг Бахцугъ
- Selo
- Location within Republic of Dagestan Location within Russia
- Coordinates: 41°30′N 47°56′E
- Country: Russia
- Region: Republic of Dagestan
- District: Kurakhsky District
- Time zone: UTC+3:00

Bakhtsug (Russian: Бахцуг; Lezgian: Бахцугъ) is a rural locality (a selo) in Ikrinsky Selsoviet, Kurakhsky District, Republic of Dagestan, Russia. The population was 163 as of 2010.

== Geography ==
Bakhtsug is located 28 km southeast of Kurakh (the district's administrative centre) by road, on the Kukirkam River. Akhnig and Shtul are the nearest rural localities.

== Nationalities ==
Lezgins live there.
