= Ashakent =

Ashakent Ашакент Ашахуьр
- Selo
- Location within Republic of Dagestan Location within Russia
- Coordinates: 41°35′N 47°52′E
- Country: Russia
- Region: Republic of Dagestan
- District: Kurakhsky District
- Time zone: UTC+3:00

Ashakent (Russian: Ашакент; Lezgian: Ашахуьр) is a rural locality (a selo) in Shtulsky Selsoviet, Kurakhsky District, Republic of Dagestan, Russia. The population was 209 as of 2010. There is 1 street.

== Geography ==
Ashakent is located 28 km east of Kurakh (the district's administrative centre) by road, on the Chafar River. Shtul and Kurakh are the nearest rural localities.

== Nationalities ==
Lezgins live there.
