= Ursun =

Ursun Урсун
- Selo
- Location within Republic of Dagestan Location within Russia
- Coordinates: 41°39′N 47°41′E
- Country: Russia
- Region: Republic of Dagestan
- District: Kurakhsky District
- Time zone: UTC+3:00

Ursun (Russian: Урсун) is a rural locality (a selo) in Shimikhyusky Selsoviet, Kurakhsky District, Republic of Dagestan, Russia. The population was 86 as of 2010. There are 4 streets.

== Geography ==
Ursun is located 14 km northwest of Kurakh (the district's administrative centre) by road, on the Khpedzhchay River. Shimikhyur and Khpyukh are the nearest rural localities.

== Nationalities ==
Lezgins live there.
