= Karesi, Balıkesir =

Karesi
- District and municipality
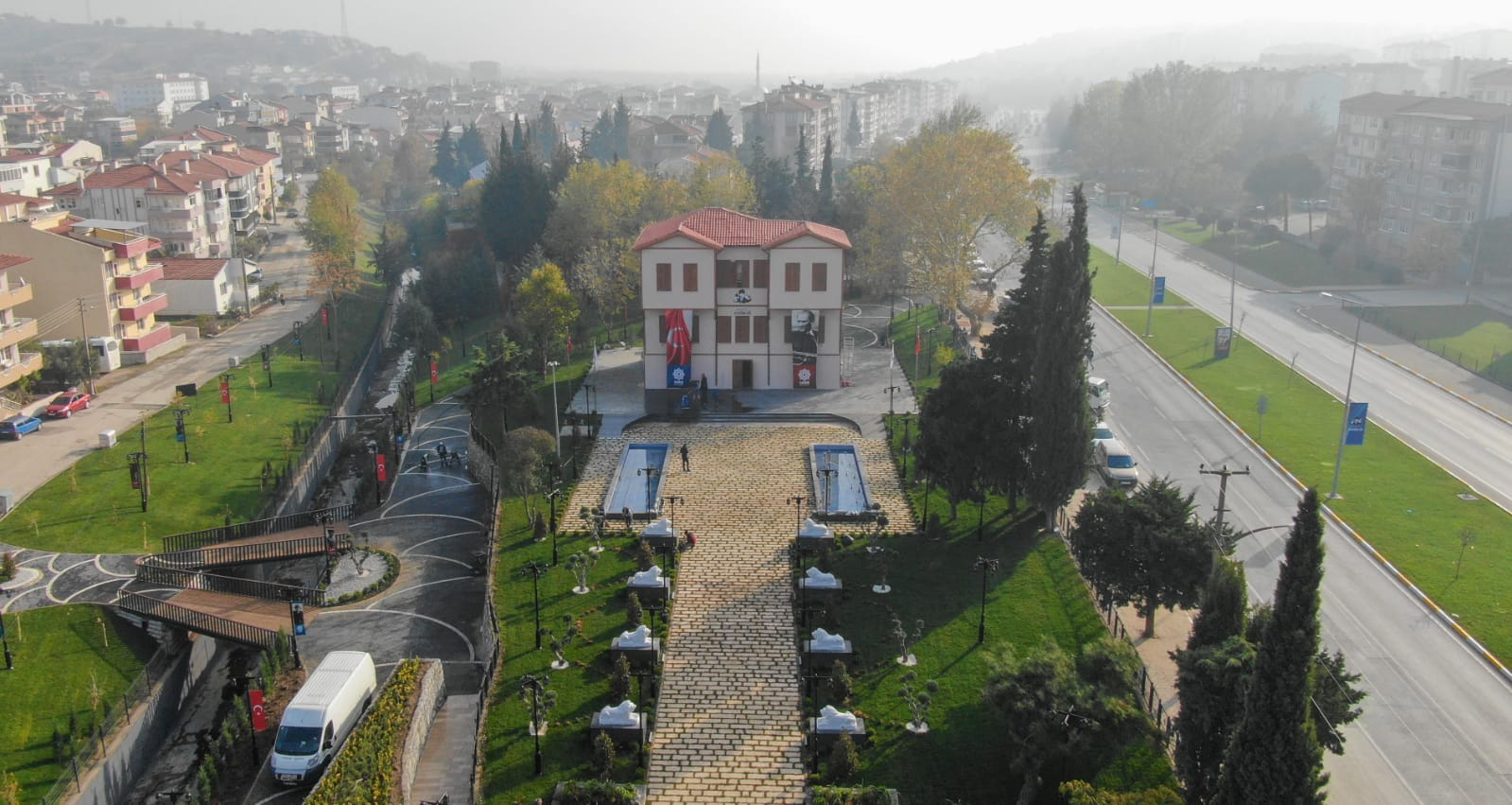
- Atatürk House, Karesi

- Logo

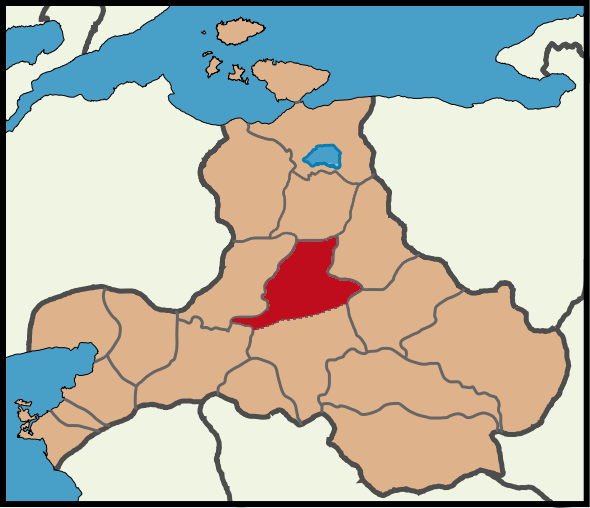
- Map showing Karesi District in Balıkesir Province

- Location within Turkey Location within Marmara
- Coordinates: 39°38′N 27°53′E
- Country: Turkey
- Province: Balıkesir

Government
  - Mayor: Dinçer Orkan (AKP)
- Area: 695 km^{2} (268 sq mi)
- Elevation: 130 m (430 ft)
- Population (2022): 187,362
  - Density: 270/km^{2} (698/sq mi)
- Time zone: UTC+3 (TRT)
- Postal code: 10100
- Area code: 0266
- Website: www.karesi.bel.tr

Karesi is a municipality and district of Balıkesir Province, Turkey. Its area is 695 km^{2}, and its population is 187,362 (2022).

The district was established in 2012, when Balıkesir Province was declared a metropolitan municipality as a part of the 2013 Turkish local government reorganisation (Law no. 6360). Karesi was created out of the former Balıkesir central district, along with Altıeylül. The name Karesi refers to a short-lived -14th-century Turkmen beylik around Balıkesir.

== Composition ==
There are 70 neighbourhoods in Karesi District:

- Adnan Menderes
- Akıncılar
- Aktarma
- Alacabayır
- Alihikmetpaşa
- Armutalan
- Atatürk
- Aygören
- Bakacak
- Beyköy
- Boğazköy
- Büyükpınar
- Çanacık
- Çay
- Çaypınar
- Davutlar
- Deliklitaş
- Dumlupınar
- Düzoba
- Ege
- Eskikuyumcular
- Fethiye
- Hacıismail
- Halkapınar
- Hisaralan
- Hisariçi
- İbirler
- Kabakdere
- Kalaycılar
- Kamçıllı Mahallesi
- Karabeyler
- Karakolköy
- Karaoğlan
- Karesi
- Kavaklı
- Kayabey
- Kırmızılar
- Kızpınar
- Kocaavşar
- Köteyli
- Kurtdere
- Kuva-Yi Milliye
- Maltepe
- Mirzabey
- Naipli
- Ortaca
- I. Oruçgazi
- II. Oruçgazi
- Ovacık
- Paşaalanı
- 1. Sakarya
- 2. Sakarya
- Şamlı
- Taşkesiği
- Tatlıpınar
- Toybelen
- Toygar
- Turplu
- Üçpınar
- Vicdaniye
- Yağcılar
- Yaylabayır
- Yaylacık
- Yenice Iskender
- Yeniköy
- Yenimahalle
- Yeroluk
- Yeşilova
- Yıldırım
- Ziyaretli

== Cityscape ==
Anafartalar Street, Milli Kuvvetler Street, Vasıf Çınar Street, Kızılay Street, Atalar Street are important streets in the city. Aygören, Karaoğlan, Dumlupınar, Hisariçi, Karesi, Kızpınar, Hacıilbey quarters are the first settlements of the city. The eldest settlements are acclivity, lane and also have adjoint buildings. Many historical places are in these quarters. A summary of new settlements are Atatürk, Paşaalanı and Adnan Menderes quarters. The squares of the city: Ali Hikmet Pasha (AHP), Republica, Wrestler Kurtdereli Mehmed and Karesi.

Trade and economic life is concentrated on three streets. These are Milli Kuvvetler Street,Kızılay Street and Anafartalar Street. Commercial life focuses on these streets and the small streets which are intersecting these streets and avenues. As a part of the city skyline, New Bazaar Area is the oldest shopping place for the city. Vasıf Çınar Street and Gazi Boulevard are other busy areas.

Salih Tozan Cultural Center is important for cultural activities in the city. Public transport area where is the point of transport networks is near the Salih Tozan. Yaylada is one of the most important places for citylife.

== Main sights ==
The capital of Balıkesir province contains many historical buildings. The clocktower (built in 1892) is the symbol of the city. A historical fountain (built in 1908) is another popular building. The Zaganos Pasha Mosque Complex and Yildirim Mosque are popular spiritual areas. Many old Balıkesir houses in the Aygören and Karaoğlan district remain from the Ottoman period. The center of the city also contains the historical Turkish "Pasha Hamami" bath, which is still in use.

Balıkesir National Photography Museum is the only photography museum in Turkey. The Museum of National Moment, exhibits historical memories of the city. Of course, Karesi is especially known for its historic windmills.

- Zaganos Pasha Mosque: Zaganos Pasha, named after one of the viziers and commanders during the reign of Fatih Sultan Mehmet was built in 1461.
- Yildirim Mosque: It's the oldest remaining work from the Ottoman period in Balikesir city. Yildirim Beyazid had it built in 1388 in the second half of the 14th century.
- Umurbey Mosque: It has an epitaph of three lines engraved on marble using a special script called Sülüs. The date is 1412.
- Clock Tower: Giridizade Mehmet, Pasha of the Governor of Silistre, had it built as a replica of the Galata Tower in İstanbul in 1827, but it collapsed in the earthquake in 1897. Governor Ömer Ali Bey, had the present tower rebuilt.
- Karesi Principality Tomb: It was built in 1336. It contains Karasi Beg's and his five children's graves. Karasi Beg's sarcophagus is decorated with Sufic script.
- Balıkesir's Historical Windmills: In Karakol village which is 25 km (15.53 mi) from Balikesir, there are seven historical windmills. But only three windmills remain. Hunting and tracking are the best sports, accompanied by windmills' views.
- Değirmenboğazı: (means Strait of mill) City forest. It is a forest area situated between two hills. A pleasant picnic place – it contains a tea garden and restaurant.
- Balikesir Local-Civil Houses:The city's oldest districts have traditional houses which show the economy and lifestyle of the city until the 1500s.
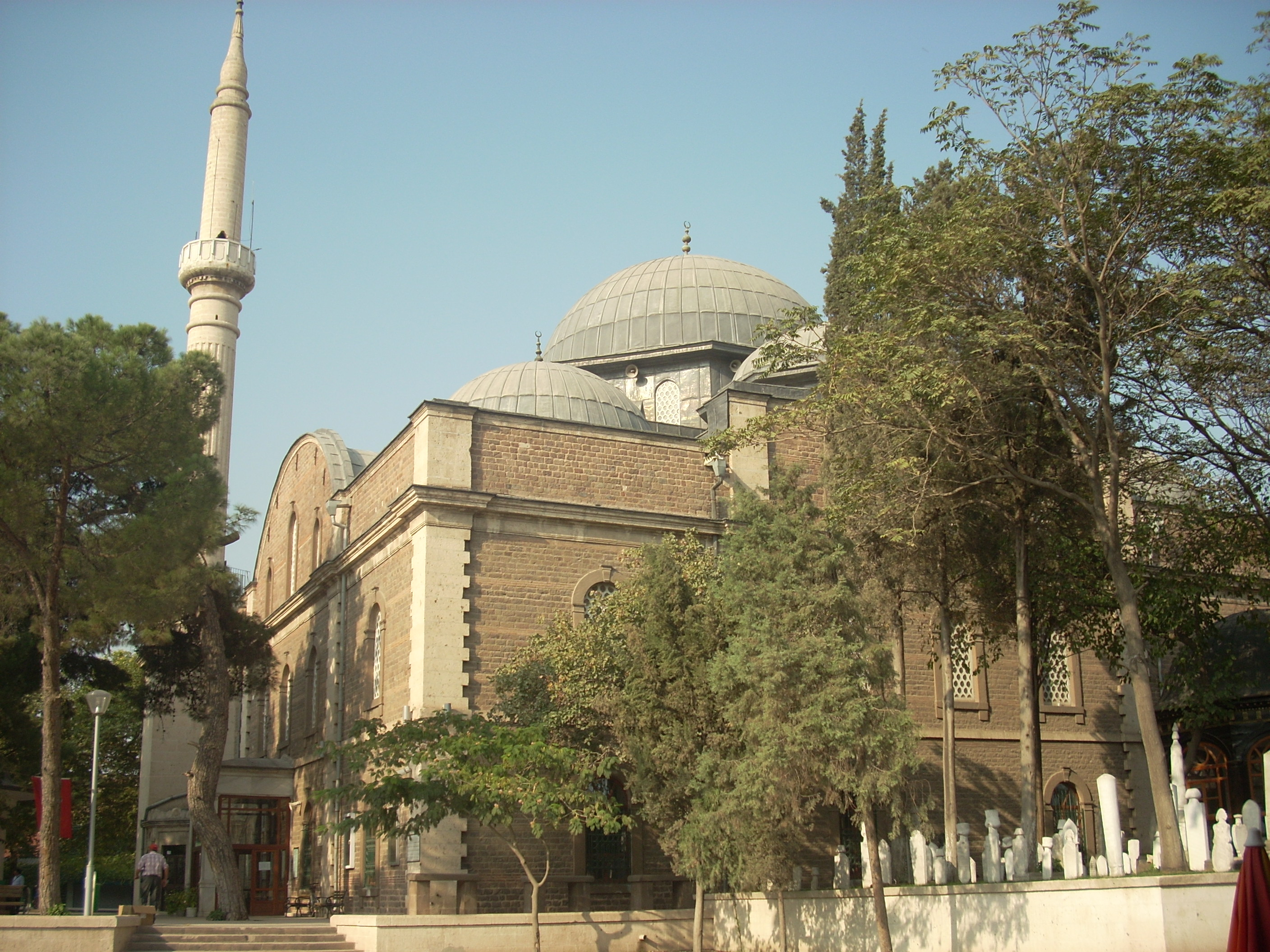
Zaganos Pasha Mosque (1461)

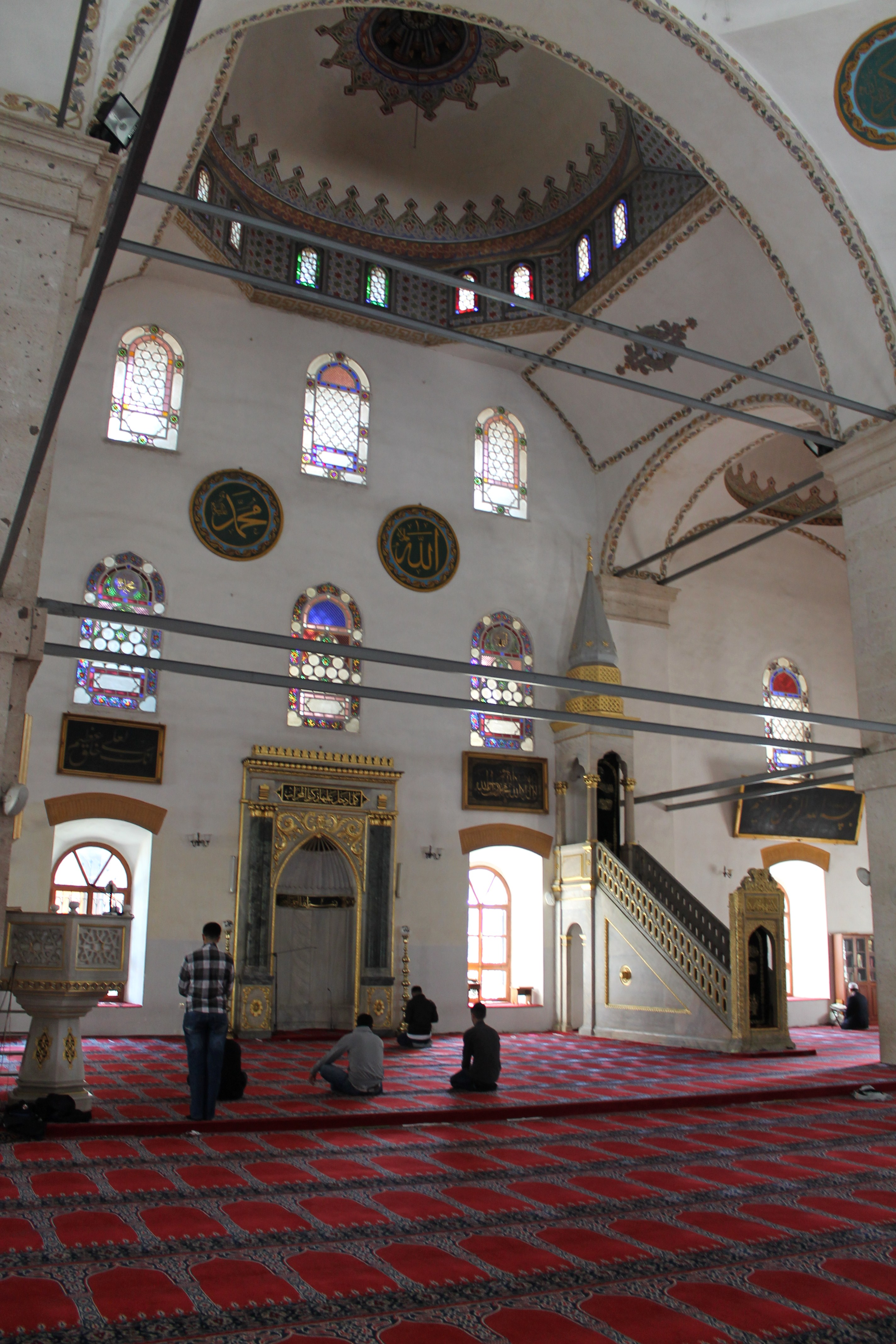
Zaganos Pasha Mosque (inside)

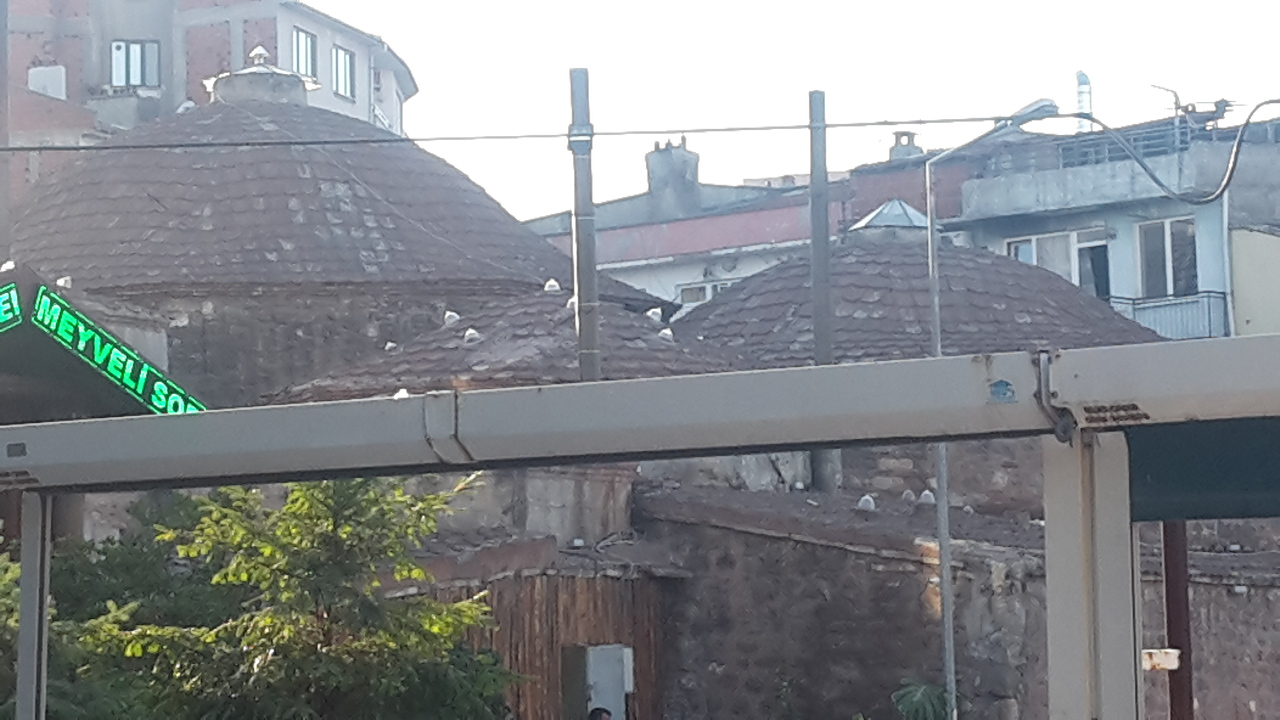
Pasha Hamami (1461)

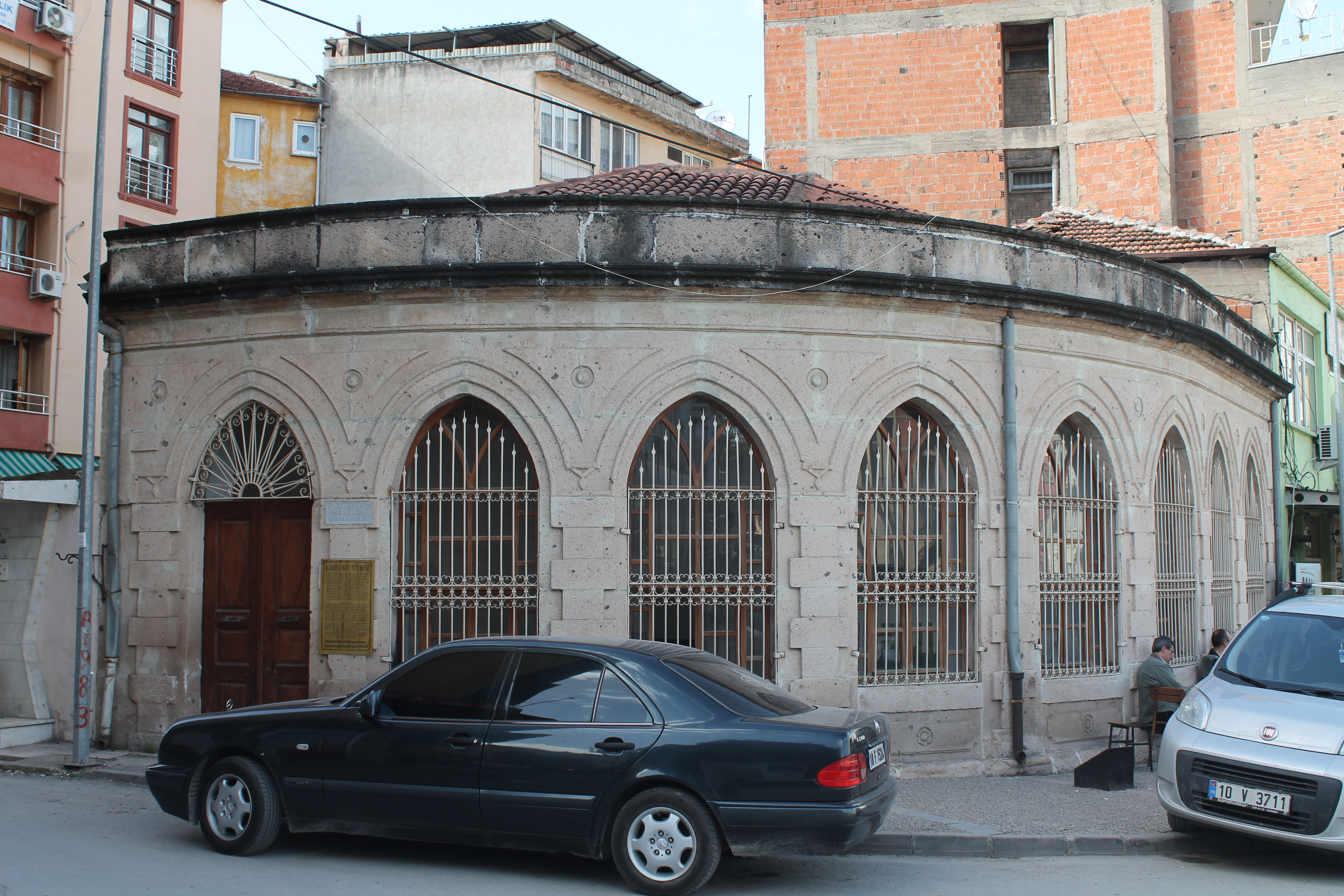
Karesibey Tomb (1336)

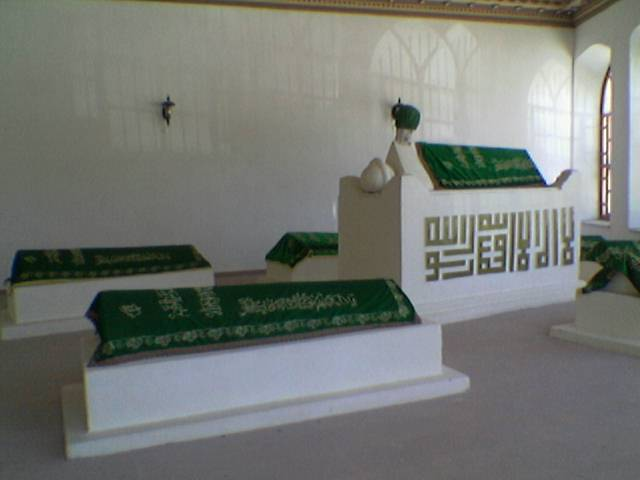
Karesibey Tomb (inside)

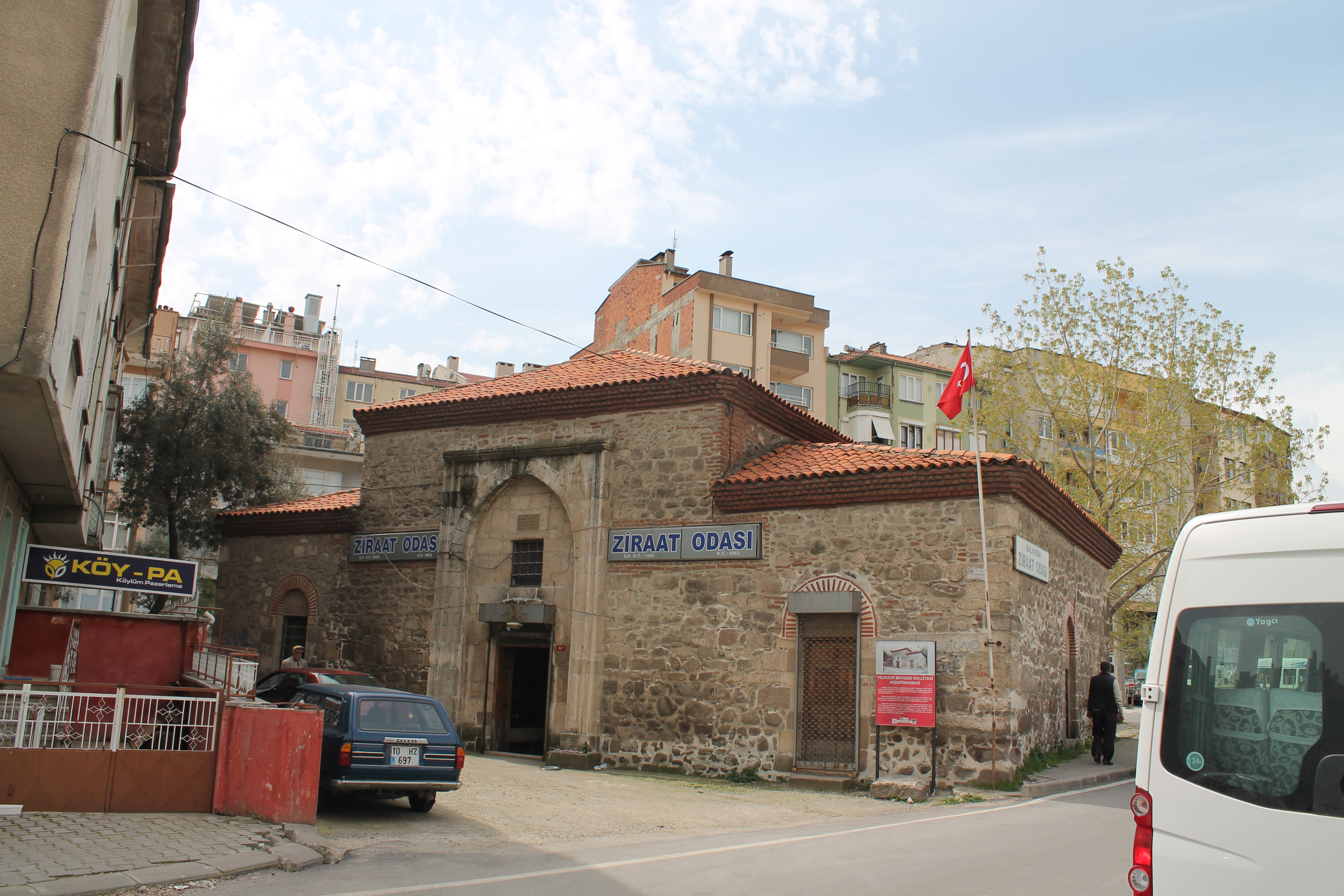
Yıldırım Beyazıt Külliyesi (Yildirim Mosque, 1388)

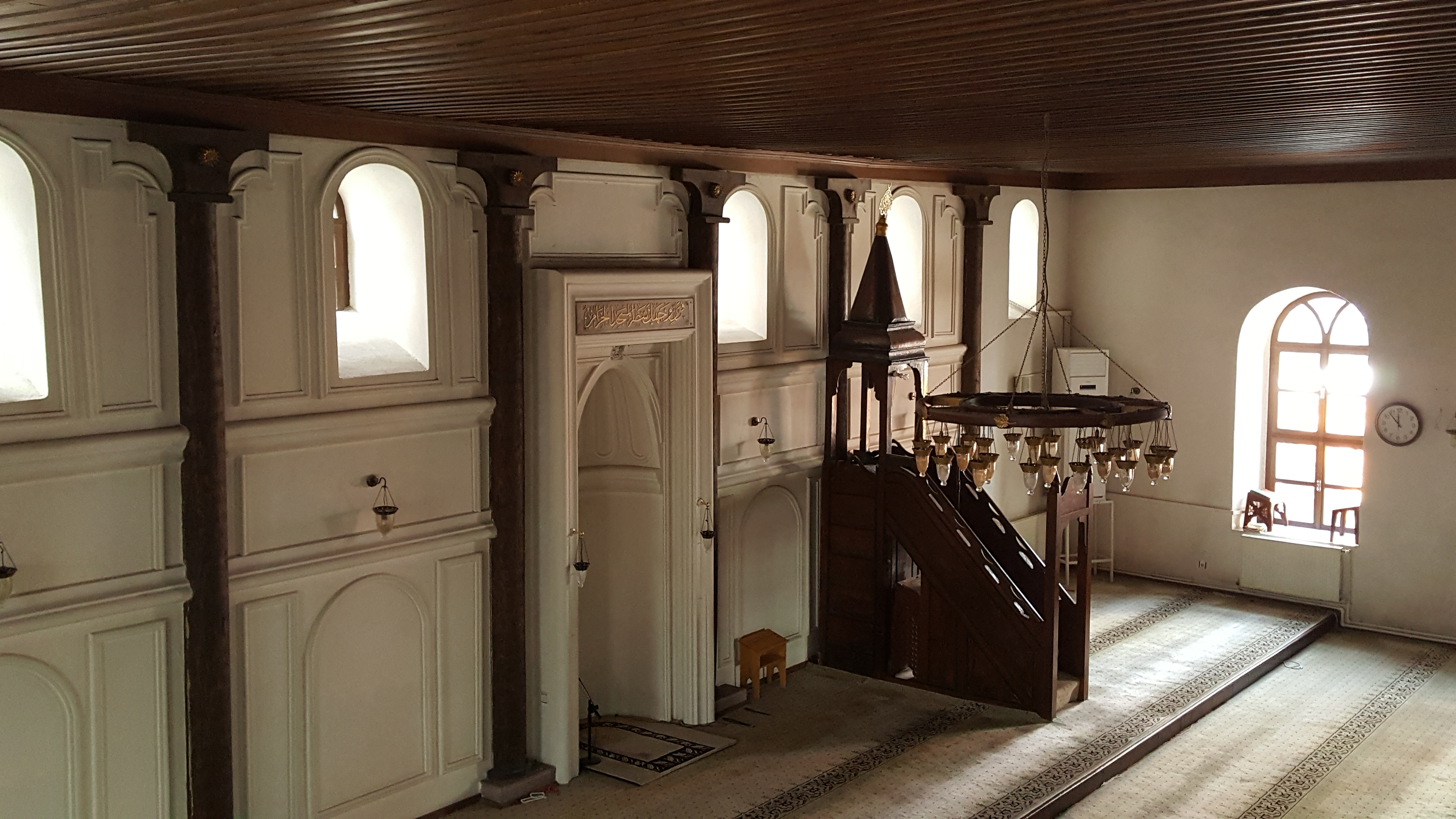
Yeşilli Mosque (1786)

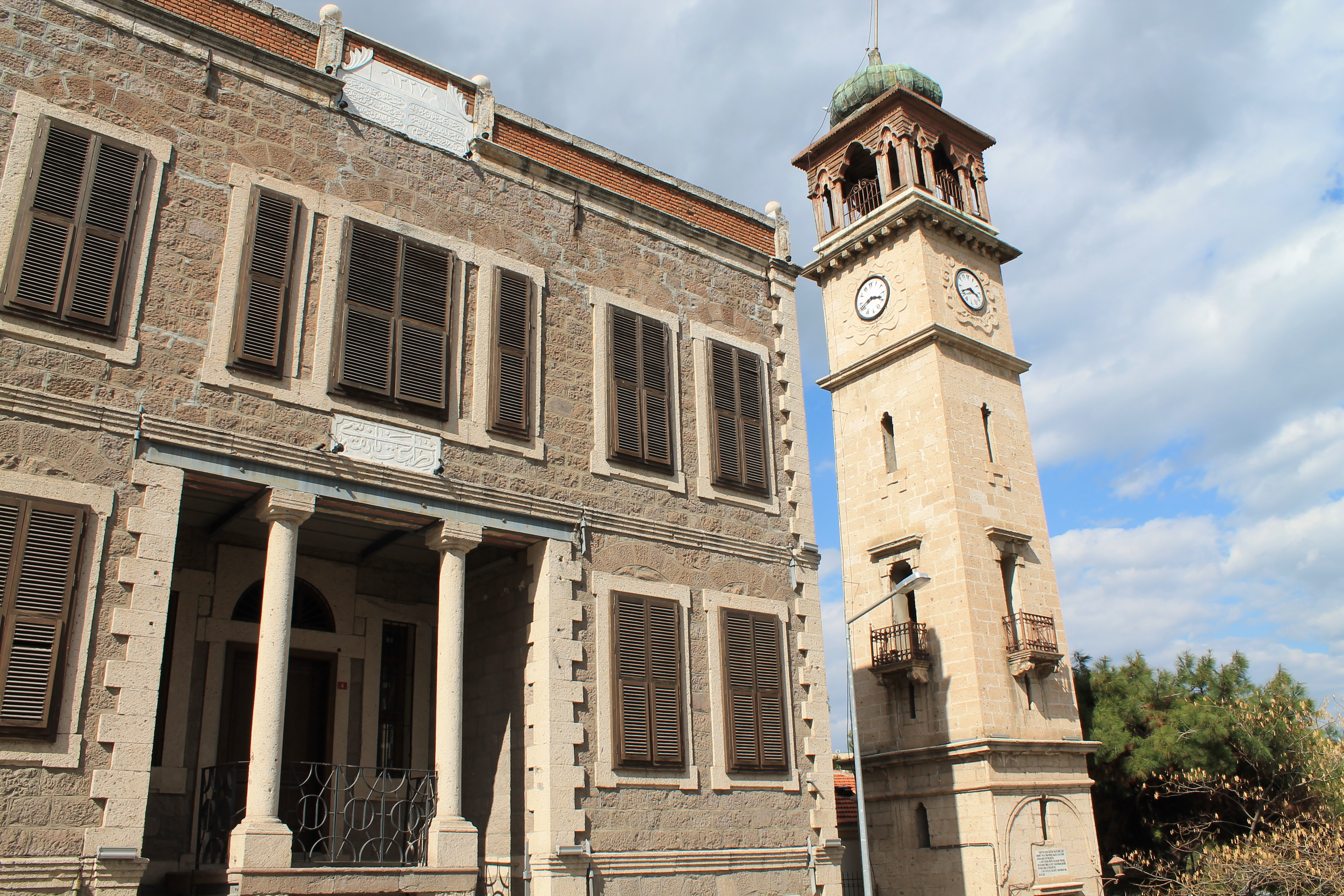
Clock Tower (1897)

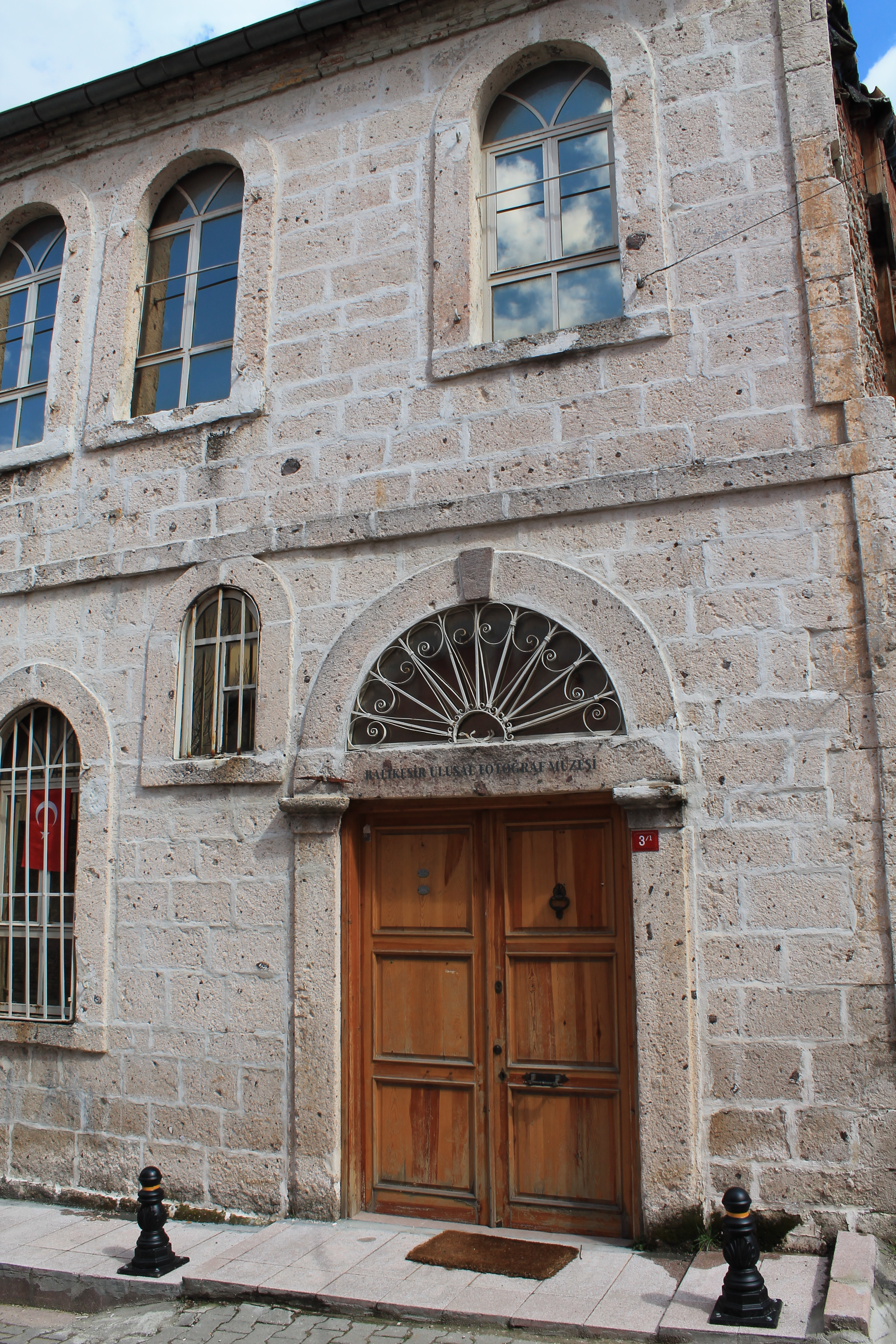
National Photograph Museum (1878)

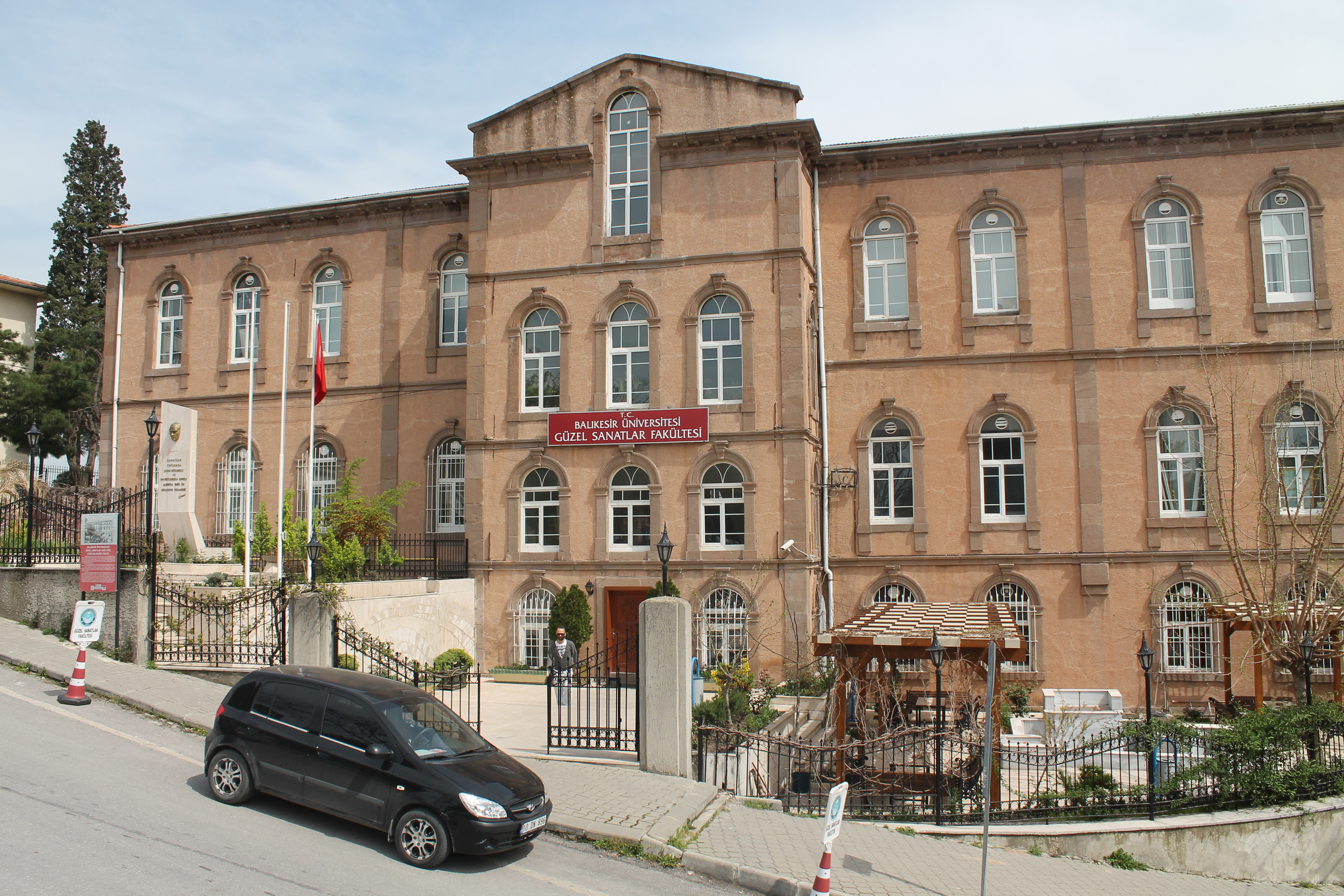
Balıkesir Sultan-ı İdadisi (Balikesir Lisesi, 1885)

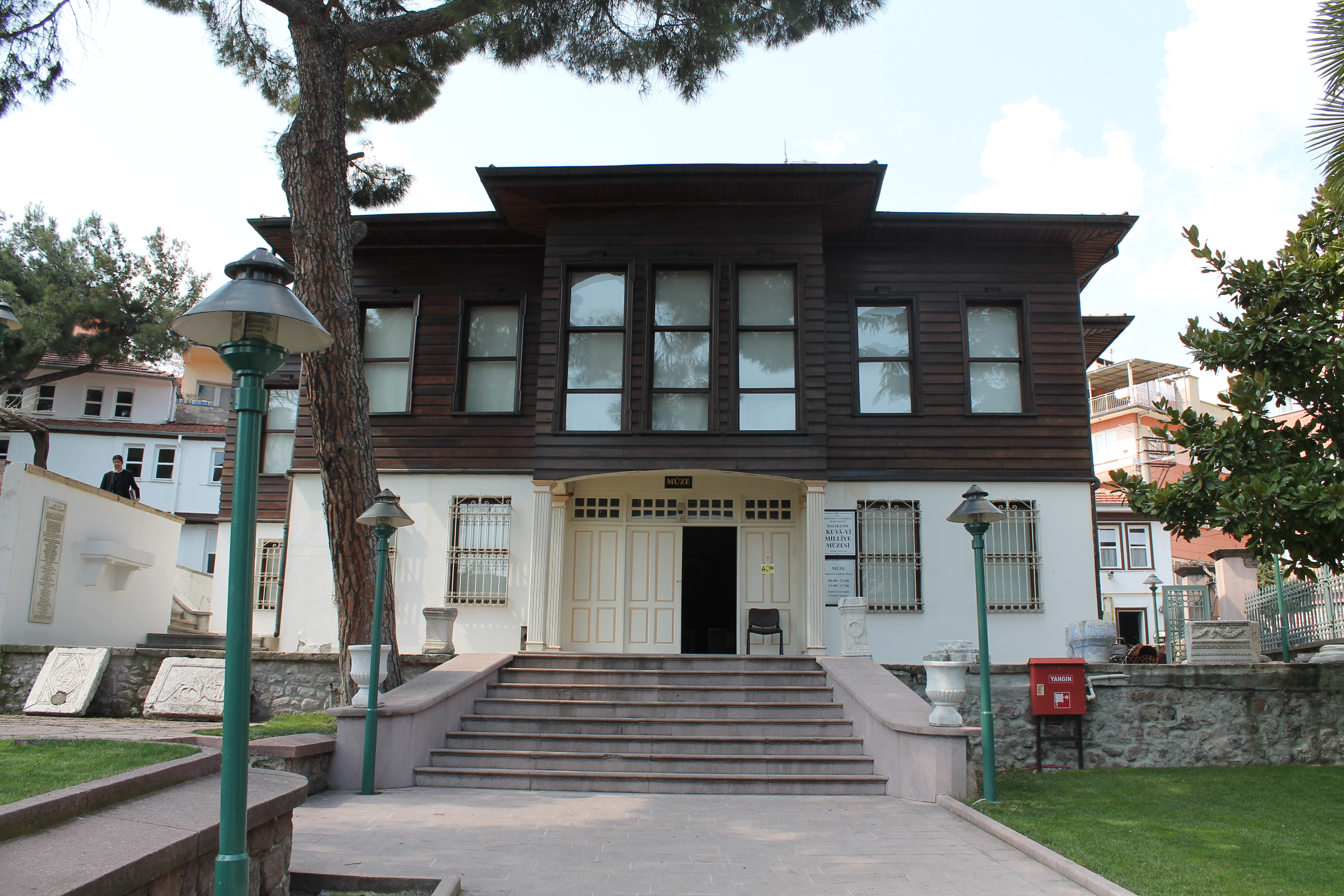
Museum of Kuvayi Milliye (Pasha Konagi, 1840)

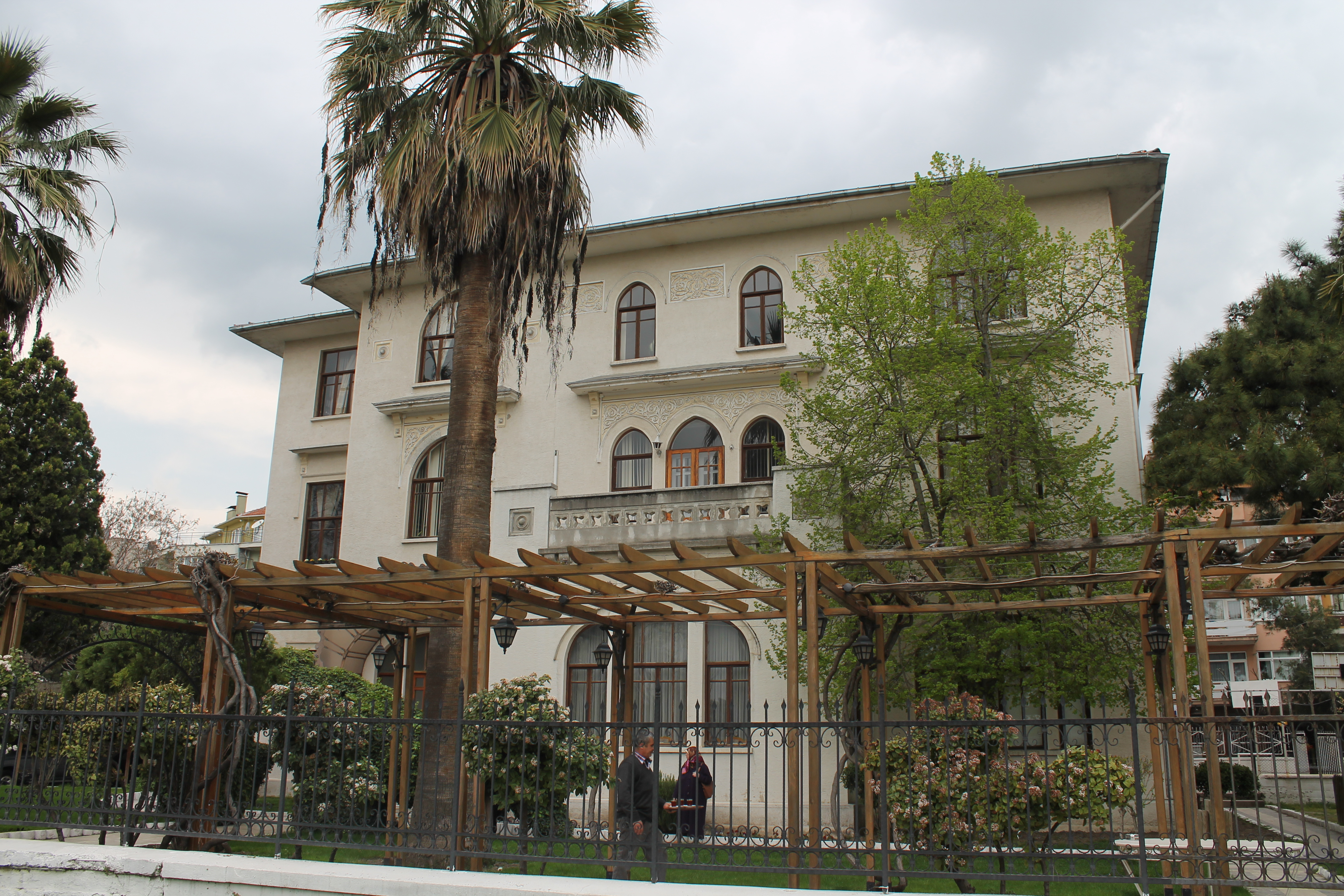
Old Mayor House (1934)

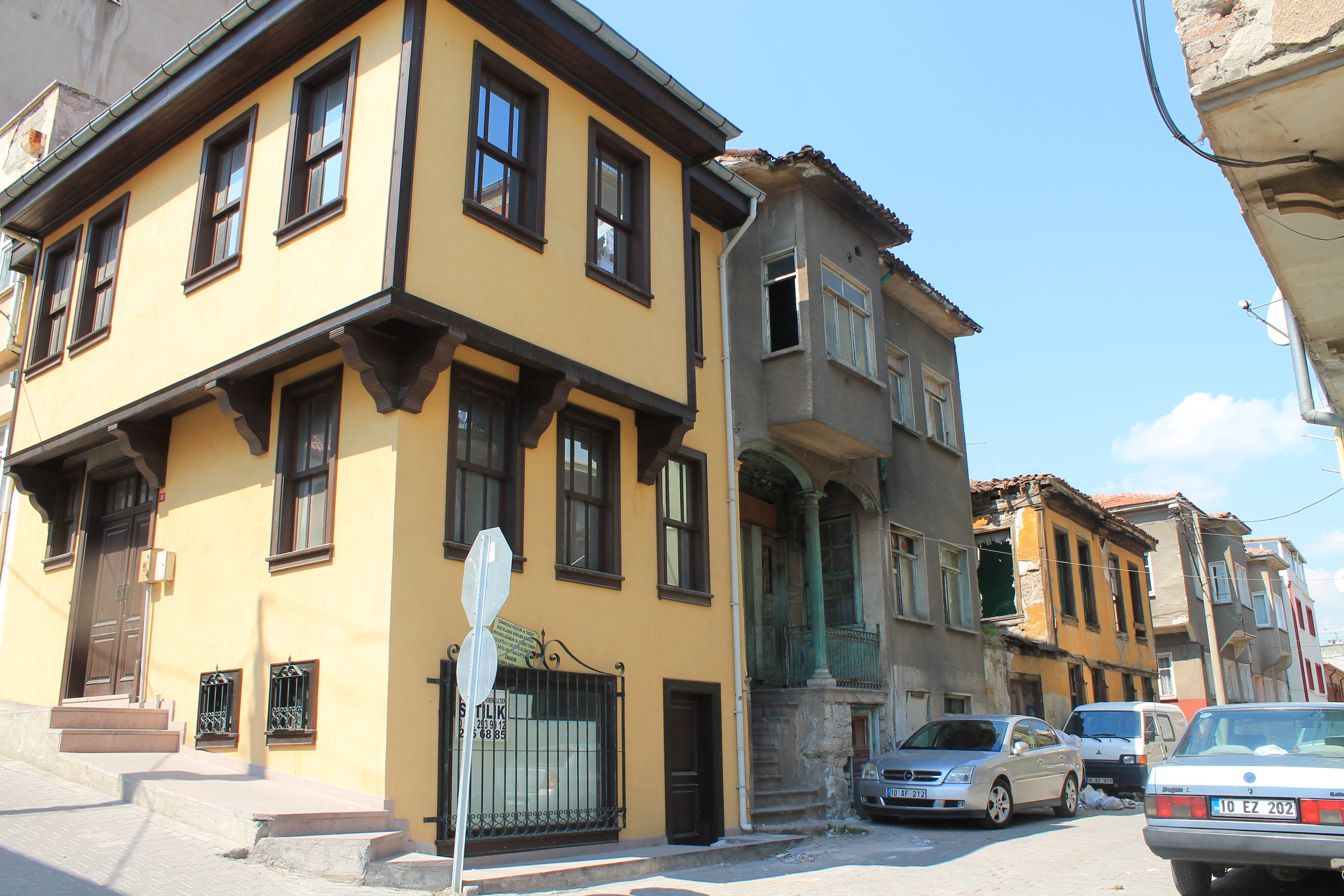
Local-Civil House

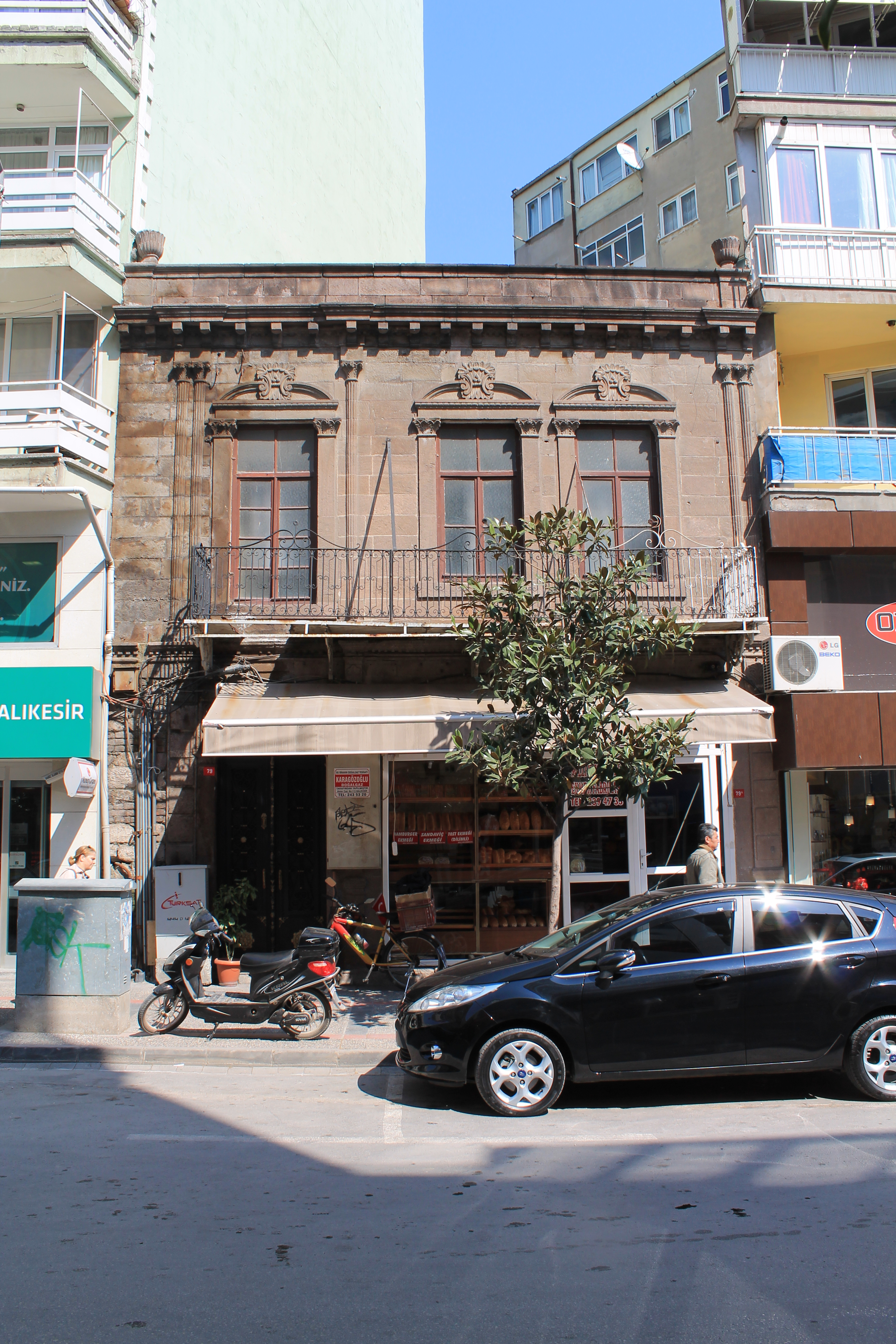
Local-Civil House

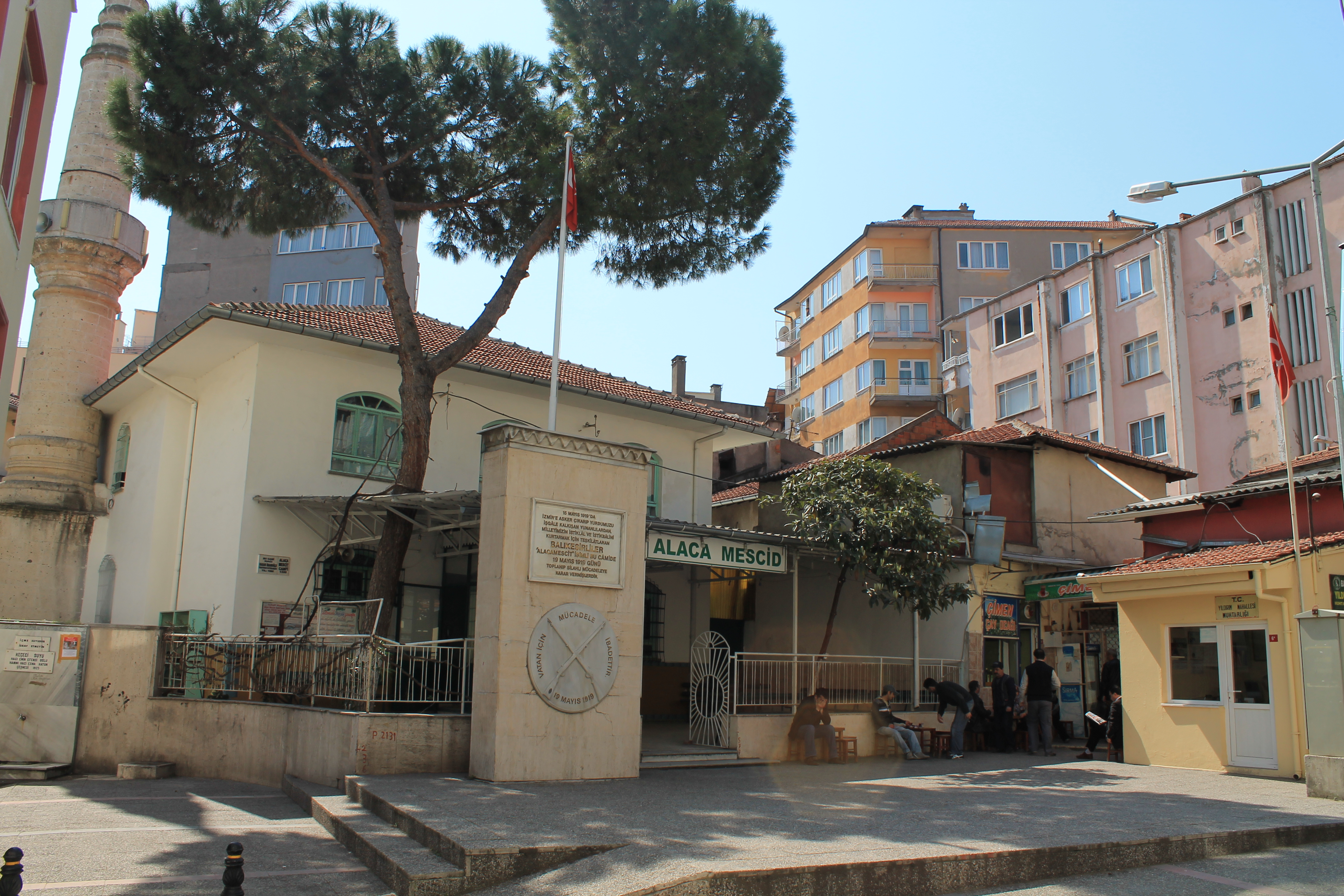
Alaca Mosque (1911)

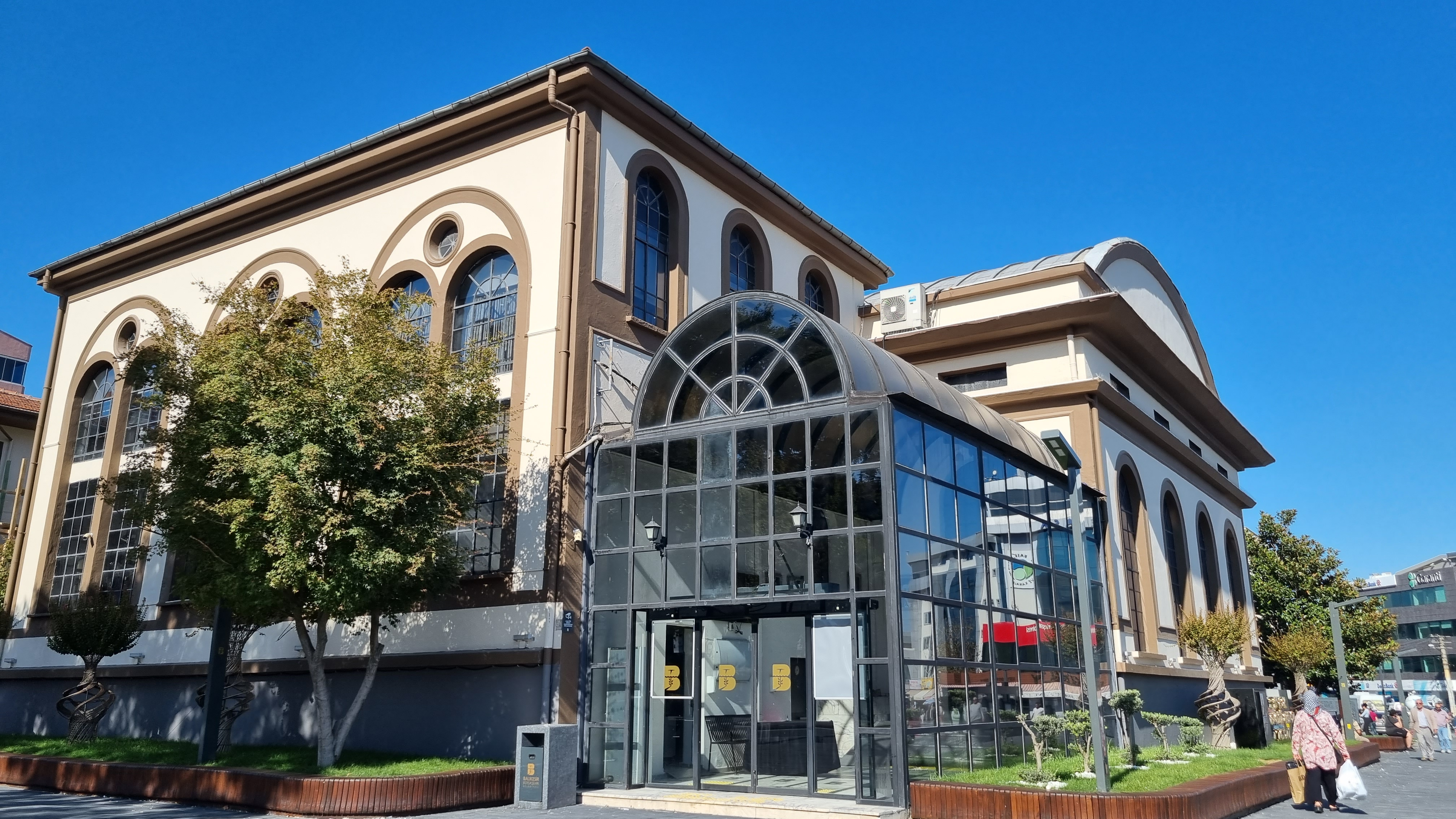
Salih Tozan Cultural Center (1921)

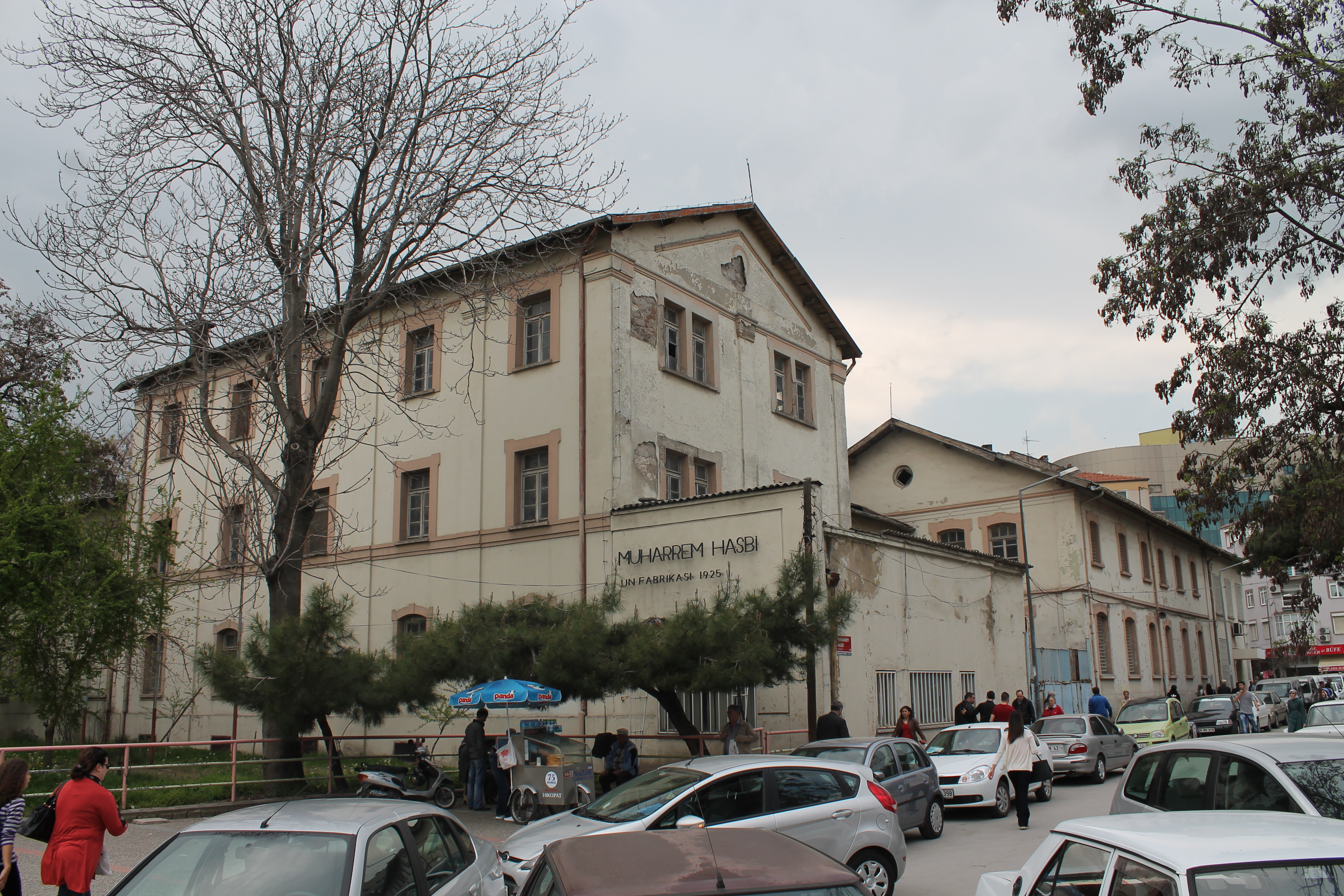
Flour Factory (1925)

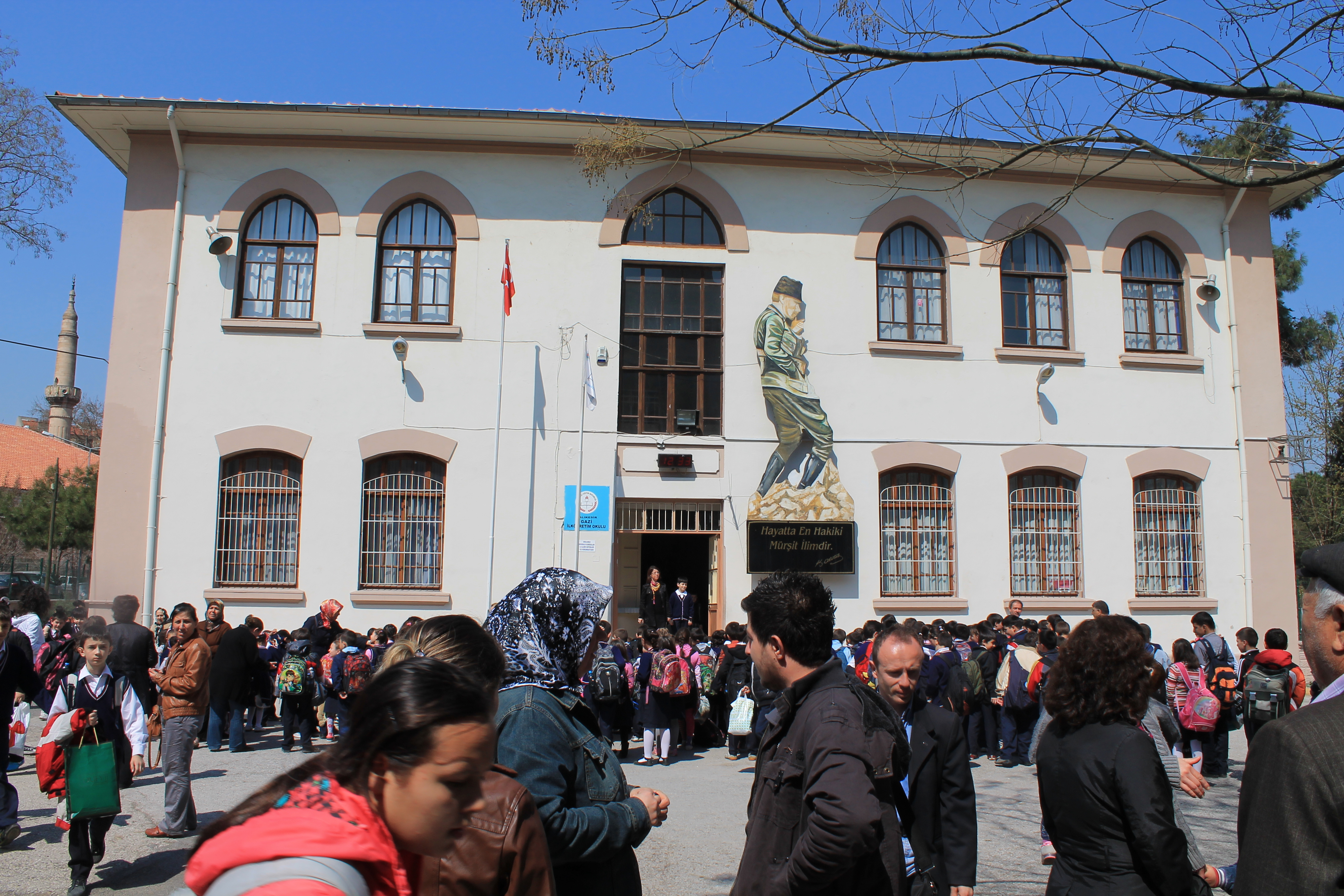
Gazi School (1928)

== Local cultural heritages ==
The main souvenir of city is Eau de Cologne is aromatic lily. Hösmerim which is made from cheese and egg is the popular dessert of this city. Many old Turkish dishes (such as keşkek, güveç, tirit, mantı, kaymaklı) compose the Karesi cuisine.

== History ==
- Karasids

== Education ==
- Balıkesir Lisesi
- Sirri Yircali Anadolu Lisesi

== Twin towns – Sister cities ==
Karesi is twinned with:

- Maçka, Turkey (since 2015)
- Schwäbisch Hall, Germany (since 2006)

== Notable natives ==
- Egemen Korkmaz – National football player
- Fikret Hakan – Actor
- Imam Birgivi – Muslim scholar
- Kadızade Mehmed - Muslim scholar
- Kurtdereli Mehmet Pehlivan – World-famous oilwrestler
- Mehmet Çoban – Olympian Greco-Roman wrestler
- Nazmi Solok – Military officer in the Ottoman and Turkish armies
- Olcan Adın – National football player
- Oğuz Savaş – National Basketball player
- Tamer Yiğit – Actor
- Tülin Altıntaş – National volleyball player
- Zağanos Pasha – Ottoman military commander
