= Khpedzh =

Khpedzh Хпедж Хпеж
- Selo
- Location within Republic of Dagestan Location within Russia
- Coordinates: 41°37′N 47°43′E
- Country: Russia
- Region: Republic of Dagestan
- District: Kurakhsky District
- Time zone: UTC+3:00

Khpedzh (Russian: Хпедж; Lezgian: Хпеж) is a rural locality (a selo) in Shimikhyusky Selsoviet, Kurakhsky District, Republic of Dagestan, Russia. The population was 244 as of 2010. There are 3 streets.

== Geography ==
Khpedzh is located 7 km northwest of Kurakh (the district's administrative centre) by road, on the Khpedzhchay River. Kurakh and Khyurekhyur are the nearest rural localities.

== Nationalities ==
Lezgins live there.
