= Shtul =

Shtul Штул
- Selo
- Location within Republic of Dagestan Location within Russia
- Coordinates: 41°33′N 47°55′E
- Country: Russia
- Region: Republic of Dagestan
- District: Kurakhsky District
- Time zone: UTC+3:00

Shtul (Russian: Штул) is a rural locality (a selo) and the administrative centre of Shtulsky Selsoviet, Kurakhsky District, Republic of Dagestan, Russia. The population was 258 as of 2010. There are 3 streets.

== Geography ==
Shtul is located 18 km (11 mi) southeast of Kurakh (the district's administrative centre) by road. Kutul and Kurakh are the nearest rural localities.

== Nationalities ==
Lezgins live there.
