= Ashar, Republic of Dagestan =

Ashar Ашар
- Selo
- Location within Republic of Dagestan Location within Russia
- Coordinates: 41°37′N 47°39′E
- Country: Russia
- Region: Republic of Dagestan
- District: Kurakhsky District
- Time zone: UTC+3:00

Ashar (Russian: Ашар) is a rural locality (a selo) and the administrative centre of Asharsky Selsoviet, Kurakhsky District, Republic of Dagestan, Russia. The population was 565 as of 2010. There are 7 streets.

== Geography ==
Ashar is located 12 km northwest of Kurakh (the district's administrative centre) by road. Kurakh and Khyurekhyur are the nearest rural localities.

== Nationalities ==
Lezgins live there.
