= Khpyuk =

Khpyuk Хпюк Хуьпуькь
- Selo
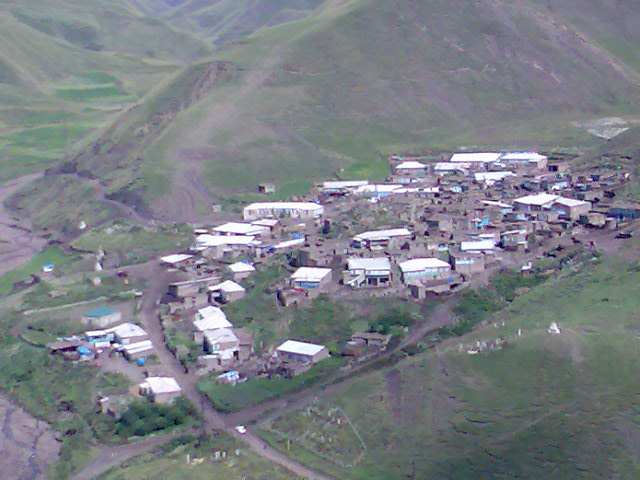

- Location within Republic of Dagestan Location within Russia
- Coordinates: 41°40′N 47°40′E
- Country: Russia
- Region: Republic of Dagestan
- District: Kurakhsky District
- Time zone: UTC+3:00

Khpyuk (Russian: Хпюк; Aghul: Хуьпуькь) is a rural locality (a selo) in Kurakhsky District, Republic of Dagestan, Russia. The population was 361 as of 2010. There are 3 streets.

== Geography ==
Khpyuk is located 17 km northwest of Kurakh (the district's administrative centre) by road. Shimikhyur and Ashar are the nearest rural localities.

== Nationalities ==
Aghul people live there.
