= Khyurekhyur =

Khyurekhyur Хюрехюр Хуьрехуьр
- Selo
- Location within Republic of Dagestan Location within Russia
- Coordinates: 41°33′N 47°44′E
- Country: Russia
- Region: Republic of Dagestan
- District: Kurakhsky District
- Time zone: UTC+3:00

Khyurekhyur (Russian: Хюрехюр; Lezgian: Хуьрехуьр) is a rural locality (a selo) in Kochkhyursky Selsoviet, Kurakhsky District, Republic of Dagestan, Russia. The population was 353 as of 2010.

== Geography ==
Khyurekhyur is located 13 km southwest of Kurakh (the district's administrative centre) by road. Kurakh is the nearest rural locality.

== Nationalities ==
Lezgins live there.
