= Ortaca, Karesi =

Neighbourhood in Balıkesir, Turkey

Ortaca Kirne
- Neighbourhood
- Location within Turkey Location within Marmara
- Coordinates: 39.745°N 27.851°E
- Country: Turkey
- Province: Balıkesir
- District: Karesi
- Population (2025): 224
- Time zone: UTC+3 (TRT)
- Postal code: 10000

Ortaca (also known as Kirne or Kirni; Lezgian: Кирне Lezgian pronunciation: [kirne]) is a neighbourhood (mahalle) of the Karesi District, Balıkesir Province, in northwestern Turkey. Formerly a village, it was founded in the second half of the 19th century by Lezgin muhacirs from Dagestan and is one of a small number of settlements in Turkey with a Lezgin population. The Lezgian language remains in use there, although its use among younger residents has declined. In 2025 the neighbourhood had a population of 224.

== Name ==
The settlement was originally named Kirne. According to local accounts, Kirne was the name of a stream in Dagestan, and the settlers gave it to their new village because a similar stream flowed near the site and the surroundings resembled their homeland. In 1961 the name was changed to Ortaca, reportedly because the village lay at the centre of seven or eight surrounding villages. Residents continue to use the older name widely when speaking of the village.

== Geography ==
Ortaca lies north of the city of Balıkesir. Sources give its distance from the city centre as between about 10 and 20 km, most often 13 km. Its climate is described as a modified Mediterranean climate. Houses are built in Lezgin rural style, mostly with red tile roofs, and the village has a mosque with a tall minaret and a tea house that serves as a social club.

== History ==
According to ethnographer Magomedkhan Magomedkhanov and local chronicles, Kirne was founded by Lezgin muhacirs from the territory of present-day Kurakh District, particularly from the village of Kabir, as well as by individual Lezgin families who migrated from various villages of the former Kyurinsky Okrug. These Lezgins left their homelands following the suppression of the anti-Russian uprising of 1877. Balıkesir Province as a whole received many migrants from the Caucasus and the Balkans in the 19th century, most of them during and after the Russo-Turkish War of 1877–78.

Other accounts of the origins differ. Local compilers describe the settlers as Lezgins from areas of present-day Dagestan and Azerbaijan who left the Caucasus after the surrender of Imam Shamil and took refuge in the Ottoman Empire. They describe Kirne as the second Lezgin village founded in the Balıkesir area, after Dümberez (now Yayla) in Manyas District. In this account, families dissatisfied with the climate at Dümberez moved to the flatter, then wooded site of the present village. Another account attributes the Lezgins' departure from their homeland to government pursuit of participants in and supporters of Shamil's movement.

A primary school has operated in the village since 1928. In 1961 the village was renamed Ortaca. It is now administratively a neighbourhood of Karesi, a district within the Balıkesir metropolitan municipality.

== Demographics ==
According to address-based population registration data, Ortaca had 224 inhabitants in 2025, of whom 108 (48.2%) were male and 116 (51.8%) female.

Population of Ortaca
Year	Population
1997	261
2000	291
2013	240
2014	236
2015	224
2016	214
2017	208
2018	207
2019	217
2020	203
2021	204
2022	199
2023	203
2024	212
2025	224

Estimates of household numbers vary by source and date. One account puts the village at about 120 households at its founding, a peak of around 150 households after the 1940s, and about 100 households in the 2020s. Others report 70 to 100 households and around 400 inhabitants in the 2010s or earlier.

=== Language ===
Lezgian has been the community's main language. Earlier accounts say it was spoken in every household, so that some children learned Turkish only on starting school, but later accounts describe a decline. It recorded the youngest fluent speakers as around 25 years old, with younger residents understanding the language but not speaking it. The village's literacy rate is estimated to be between 99% and 100%.

== Culture ==
Local accounts describe traditions drawn from Caucasian and Dagestani culture, many of which have faded. Until about the 1970s, weddings were typically celebrated with Caucasian dances accompanied by accordion music, before local Turkish dances became common. Traditional dishes are mostly dough-based and include piçek, afar, hinkal, heşil, şüre and haluç (Turkish spellings), though many are no longer commonly prepared.

Poems in Lezgian language by Mehmet Ferdi Eser Hoca of Kirne, along with those of other Turkish Lezgin poets, were preserved within the community and printed in the local journal Lezgistan.

No historic structures are known to survive in the village except one. Its old stone fountains were repaired with concrete after the 1970s, the Aslan spring (Aslanardbulax), formerly marked by stone lion figures, was rebuilt in concrete. The Mered spring (Meredbulax) remains as the only stone structure.
