= Ukuz =

Ukuz Укуз Уккуд
- Selo
- Location within Republic of Dagestan Location within Russia
- Coordinates: 41°41′N 47°35′E
- Country: Russia
- Region: Republic of Dagestan
- District: Kurakhsky District
- Time zone: UTC+3:00

Ukuz (Russian: Укуз; Aghul: Уккуд) is a rural locality (a selo) in Usugsky Selsoviet, Kurakhsky District, Republic of Dagestan, Russia. The population was 36 as of 2010. There are 2 streets.

== Geography ==
Ukuz is located 27 km northwest of Kurakh (the district's administrative centre) by road. Usug and Gelkhen are the nearest rural localities.

== Nationalities ==
Aghul people live there.
