= Kvardal =

Kvardal Квардал Курдал
- Selo
- Location within Republic of Dagestan Location within Russia
- Coordinates: 41°40′N 47°33′E
- Country: Russia
- Region: Republic of Dagestan
- District: Kurakhsky District
- Time zone: UTC+3:00

Kvardal (Russian: Квардал; Aghul: Курдал) is a rural locality (a selo) in Gelkhensky Selsoviet, Kurakhsky District, Republic of Dagestan, Russia. As of 2010, the population was 184.

== Geography ==
Kvardal is located 25 km northwest of Kurakh, the district's administrative centre by road. The nearest rural localities to Kvardal are Usug and Gelkhen.

== Nationalities ==
Aghul people live there.
