= Gelkhen =

Gelkhen Гельхен Гелхен
- Selo
- Location within Republic of Dagestan Location within Russia
- Coordinates: 41°39′N 47°36′E
- Country: Russia
- Region: Republic of Dagestan
- District: Kurakhsky District
- Time zone: UTC+3:00

Gelkhen (Russian: Гельхен; Lezgian: Гелхен) is a rural locality (a selo) and the administrative centre of Gelkhensky Selsoviet, Kurakhsky District, Republic of Dagestan, Russia. The population was 577 as of 2010. There are 4 streets.

== Nationalities ==
Lezgins live there.

== Geography ==
Gelkhen is located 20 km northwest of Kurakh (the district's administrative centre) by road. Usug and Khlyuk are the nearest rural localities.
