= Balıkesir High School =

Coordinates: 39.6461°N 27.8767°E

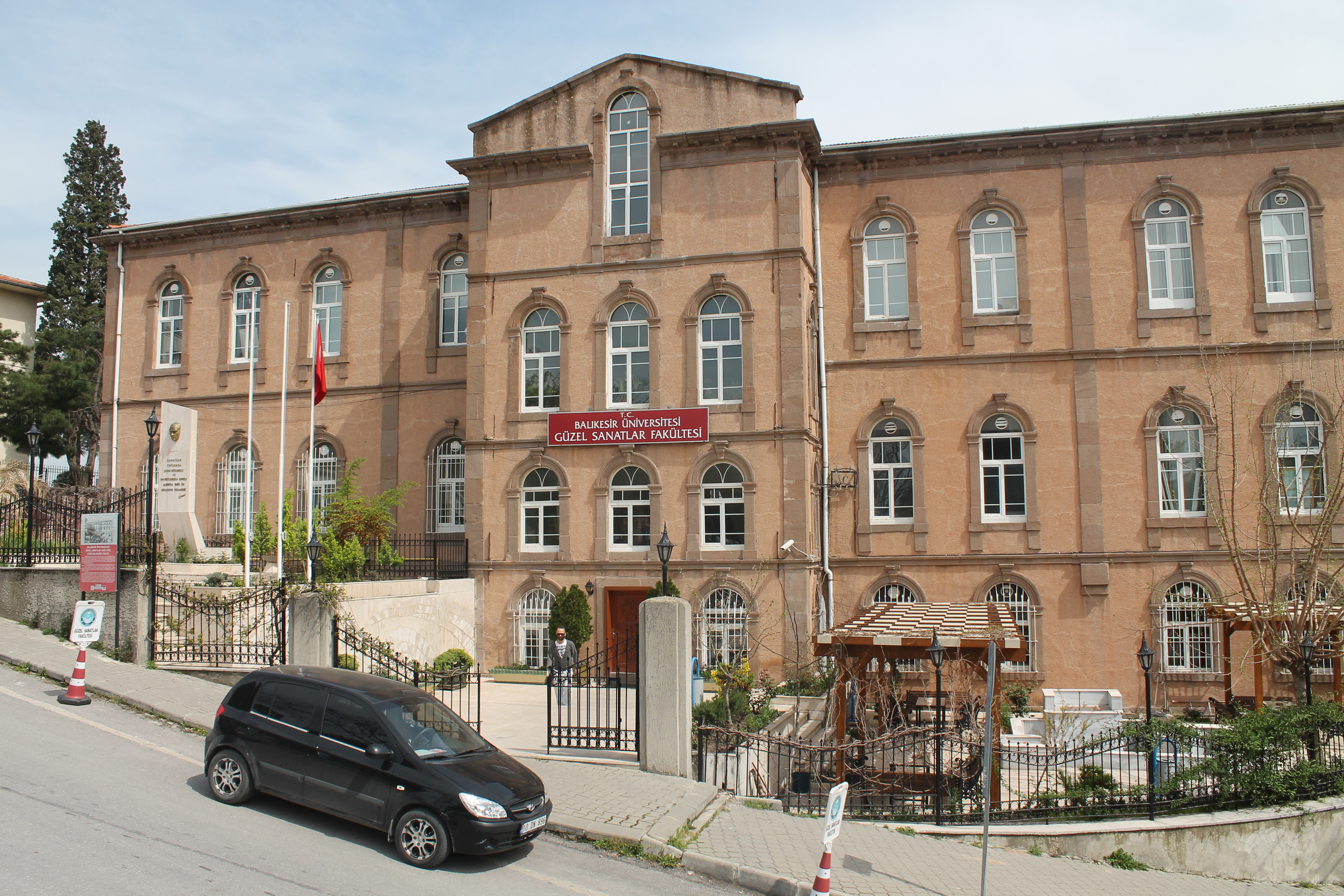
- Balıkesir; TR

Information
- Established: 15 February 1885
- Head teacher: Yüksel Kocaşahan
- Website: Official Web Page

Balıkesir High School (Turkish: Balıkesir Lisesi), in Balıkesir, Turkey, was founded in 1885 with the name of Balıkesir Sultanisi.

== Notable Alumnies ==
- Attilâ İlhan
- Bedii Faik Akın
- Burhan Özfatura
- Çolpan İlhan
- İbrahim Bodur
- İlker Ayrık
- Kenan Evren
- Mehmet Ali Erbil
- Tanju Okan
- Yusuf Atılgan
