= Museum of the Nationalist Forces in Balıkesir =

Museum in Turkey

- Balıkesir Kuva-yi Milliye Müzesi
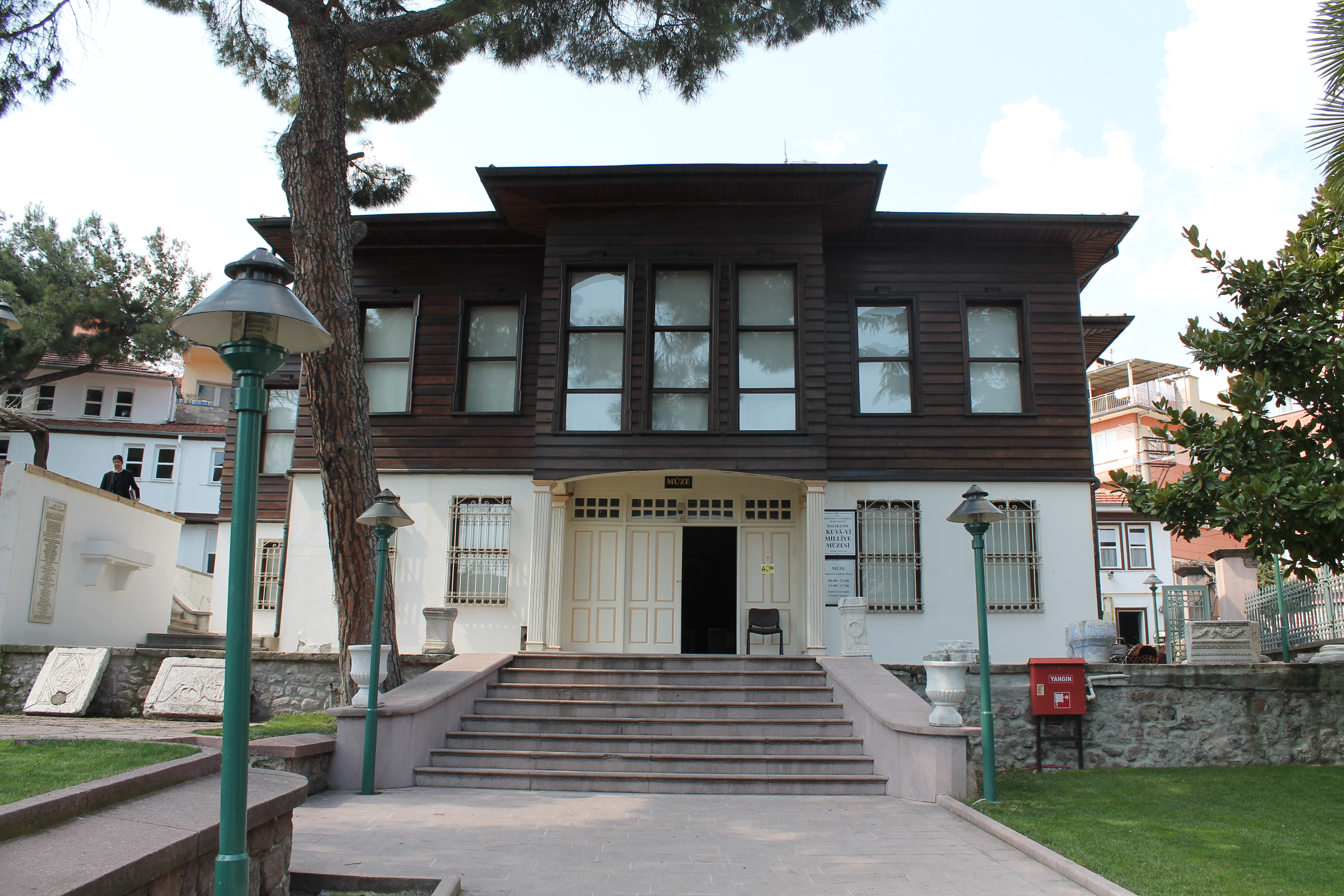
- Museum of the Nationalist Forces in Balıkesir

- Balıkesir National Forces Museum
- Established: 1996; 30 years ago
- Location: Anafartalar Cad. Eski Belediye 58, Balıkesir, Turkey
- Coordinates: 39°38′45″N 27°52′46″E
- Type: Memorial House, archaeology, ethnography
- Collection size: 4,979
- Owner: Ministry of Culture and Tourism

Museum of the Nationalist Forces in Balıkesir (Turkish: Balıkesir Kuva-yi Milliye Müzesi) is a museum in Balıkesir, Turkey, dedicated to the irregular Kuva-yi Milliye (Nationalist Forces) formed as part of the Turkish National Movement during the Turkish War of Independence (1919–1923).

== Location and access ==
The museum is situated in Anafartalar Cad. 58 in Balıkesir. It is open everyday but Monday from 8:30 to 17:00 hours local time.

== Background ==
The original building on the site of the museum was a mansion built for Giridizade Mehmet Pasha, treasurer of the Karasi Sanjak, in 1840. When the first mansion burned down in 1900, a new mansion was built by the treasurer's grandson, Halil Pasha. During the Turkish War of Independence, the building served as the meeting place for the local nationalist forces. The day after the occupation of Smyrna on May 15, 1919, prominent citizens of Balıkesir gathered in this mansion and formed Kuva-yi Milliye to fight against the foreign troops. It also served as headquarters of the II Corps and Ali Hikmet Ayerdem.

From 1946 on, the building was used as the municipal hall of Balıkesir. The municipal council decided in 1985–86 to redevelop the building into a museum to honor the efforts of Kuva-yi Milliye. According to a protocol signed between the municipality and the governorship of Balıkesir, the right of the building's usage was transferred to the Ministry of Culture and Tourism indefinitely.

Restoration works started after the appointment of a museum director. The museum opened on September 6, 1996. Following revision and reorganization of the building and the exhibits, the museum reopened on December 26, 2008.

== Museum ==
The museum is housed in a two-story Ottoman building with 120 m^{2} (1,300 sq ft) on each floor. It consists of two sections. On the ground floor, conclusion documents, photos and personal belongings of 41 citizens, who pioneered the forming of the Kuva-yi Milliye in Balıkesir, are on display. In addition, photos taken during Mustafa Kemal Atatürk's visit to the city on February 6, 1923, are exhibited. The upper floor is reserved for archaeological artifacts and ethnographic items found in and around Balıkesir.

The museum has 4,979 collection items and around 45,500 objects for study.
