= Bedyuk =

Bedyuk Бедюк
- Selo
- Location within Republic of Dagestan Location within Russia
- Coordinates: 41°42′N 47°31′E
- Country: Russia
- Region: Republic of Dagestan
- District: Agulsky District
- Time zone: UTC+3:00

Bedyuk (Russian: Бедюк) is a rural locality (a selo) in Richinsky Selsoviet, Agulsky District, Republic of Dagestan, Russia. The population was 305 as of 2010.

== Geography ==
Bedyuk is located 18 km southwest of Tpig (the district's administrative centre) by road. Richa is the nearest rural locality.
