= Kurakh, Russia =

Rural locality in Dagestan, Russia

Coordinates: 41°35′04″N 47°47′07″E

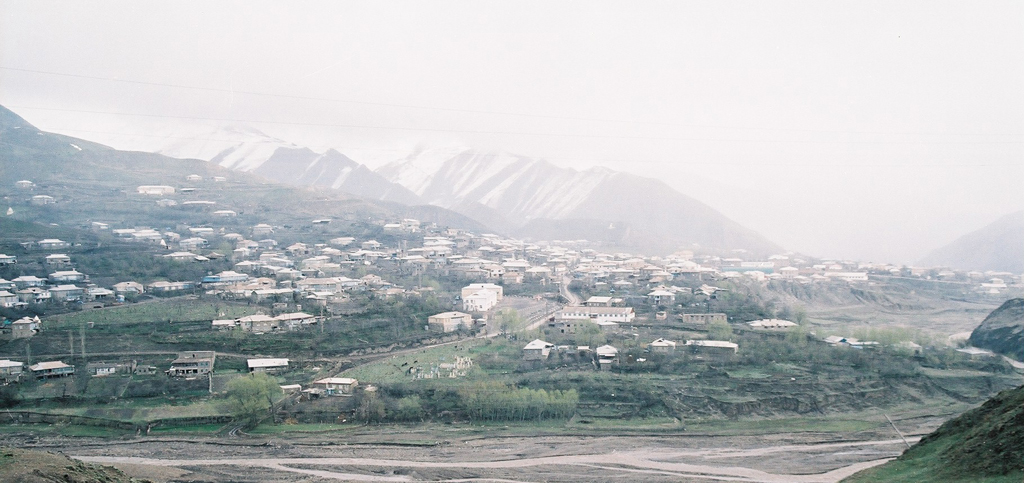

Kurakh (Russian: Курах, Lezgian: Кьурагь) is a rural locality (a selo) and the administrative center of Kurakhsky District of the Republic of Dagestan, Russia. Population: 3,235 (2010 census); 3,142 (2002 census); 2,607 (1989 Soviet census).. The Russian Officer Georgy Bergmann was born in Kurakh.
