= Kurakhsky District =

Kurakhsky District Курахский район (Russian)
- District

Other transcription(s)
  - Lezgin: Кьурагь район
  - Aghul: Къуругь райун
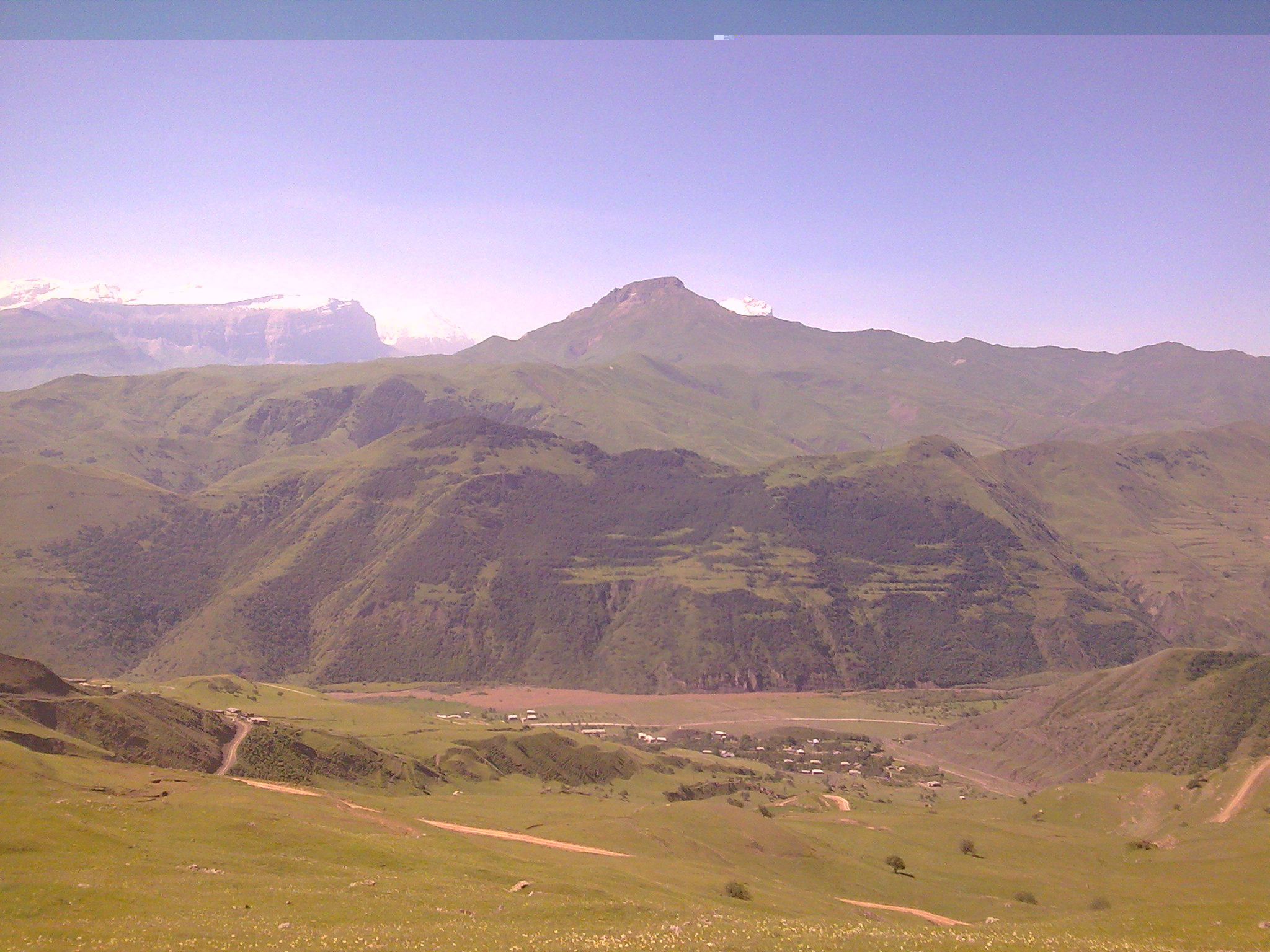
- The northern slope of Mount Gestinkil is located in Kurakhsky District

- Flag Coat of arms
- Location of Kurakhsky District in the Republic of Dagestan
- Coordinates: 41°35′N 47°47′E
- Country: Russia
- Federal subject: Republic of Dagestan
- Established: 22 November 1928
- Administrative center: Kurakh

Area
  - Total: 740 km^{2} (290 sq mi)

Population (2010 Census)
  - Total: 15,434
  - Density: 21/km^{2} (54/sq mi)
  - Urban: 0%
  - Rural: 100%

Administrative structure
  - Administrative divisions: 9 Selsoviets
  - Inhabited localities: 28 rural localities

Municipal structure
  - Municipally incorporated as: Kurakhsky Municipal District
  - Municipal divisions: 0 urban settlements, 14 rural settlements
- Time zone: UTC+3 (MSK)
- OKTMO ID: 82630000
- Website: http://www.mo-kurah.ru

Population of Kurakhsky District
- 2010 Census: 15,434
- 2002 Census: 15,206
- 1989 Census: 11,411
- 1979 Census: 14,838

Kurakhsky District (Russian: Курахский райо́н; Lezgian: Кьурагь район) is an administrative and municipal district (raion), one of the forty-one in the Republic of Dagestan, Russia. It is located in the south of the republic. The area of the district is 740 square kilometers (290 sq mi). Its administrative center is the rural locality (a selo) of Kurakh. As of the 2010 Census, the total population of the district was 15,434, with the population of Kurakh accounting for 21.0% of that number.

== Administrative and municipal status ==
Within the framework of administrative divisions, Kurakhsky District is one of the forty-one in the Republic of Dagestan. The district is divided into nine selsoviets which comprise twenty-eight rural localities. As a municipal division, the district is incorporated as Kurakhsky Municipal District. Its nine selsoviets are incorporated as fourteen rural settlements within the municipal district. The selo of Kurakh serves as the administrative center of both the administrative and municipal district.
