= Urzig, Republic of Dagestan =

Urzig Урзиг Улзигъ
- Selo
- Location within Republic of Dagestan Location within Russia
- Coordinates: 41°56′N 47°51′E
- Country: Russia
- Region: Republic of Dagestan
- District: Tabasaransky District
- Time zone: UTC+3:00

Urzig (Russian: Урзиг; Tabassaran: Улзигъ) is a rural locality (a selo) in Kuzhniksky Selsoviet, Tabasaransky District, Republic of Dagestan, Russia. Population: 349 (2010 census); 321 (2002 census); 212 (1989 Soviet census). There are 3 streets.

== Geography ==
Urzig is located 14 km west of Khuchni (the district's administrative centre) by road. Kyurek is the nearest rural locality.
