= Guvlig =

Guvlig Гувлиг Ккувлигъ
- Selo
- Location within Republic of Dagestan Location within Russia
- Coordinates: 41°55′N 47°51′E
- Country: Russia
- Region: Republic of Dagestan
- District: Tabasaransky District
- Time zone: UTC+3:00

Guvlig (Russian: Гувлиг; Tabassaran: Ккувлигъ) is a rural locality (a selo) in Guninsky Selsoviet, Tabasaransky District, Republic of Dagestan, Russia. Population: 484 (2010 census); 486 (2002 census); 340 (1989 Soviet census). There are 4 streets.

== Geography ==
Guvlig is located 20 km southwest of Khuchni (the district's administrative centre) by road. Sertil is the nearest rural locality.
