= Pilig =

Pilig Пилиг Пилигъ
- Selo
- Location within Republic of Dagestan Location within Russia
- Coordinates: 41°58′N 47°52′E
- Country: Russia
- Region: Republic of Dagestan
- District: Tabasaransky District
- Time zone: UTC+3:00

Pilig (Russian: Пилиг; Tabassaran: Пилигъ) is a rural locality (a selo) in Khuriksky Selsoviet, Tabasaransky District, Republic of Dagestan, Russia. Population: 761 (2010 census); 771 (2002 census); 839 (1989 Soviet census).

== Geography ==
Pilig is located 12 km northwest of Khuchni (the district's administrative centre) by road. Tsantil is the nearest rural locality.
