= Turag, Republic of Dagestan =

Turag Тураг Тӏюрягъ
- Selo
- Location within Republic of Dagestan Location within Russia
- Coordinates: 41°51′N 47°58′E
- Country: Russia
- Region: Republic of Dagestan
- District: Tabasaransky District
- Time zone: UTC+3:00

Turag (Russian: Тураг; Tabassaran: Тӏюрягъ) is a rural locality (a selo) and the administrative centre of Turagsky Selsoviet, Tabasaransky District, Republic of Dagestan, Russia. Population: 1,164 (2010 census); 1,405 (2002 census); 1,114 (1989 Soviet census). There are 8 streets.

== Geography ==
Turag is located 17 km south of Khuchni (the district's administrative centre) by road. Zirdag and Sika are the nearest rural localities.
