= Gyugryag =

Gyugryag Гюгряг Гюгьрягъ
- Selo
- Location within Republic of Dagestan Location within Russia
- Coordinates: 41°56′N 47°54′E
- Country: Russia
- Region: Republic of Dagestan
- District: Tabasaransky District
- Time zone: UTC+3:00

Gyugryag (Russian: Гюгряг; Tabassaran: Гюгьрягъ) is a rural locality (a selo) in Guriksky Selsoviet, Tabasaransky District, Republic of Dagestan, Russia. Population: 268 (2010 census); 338 (2002 census); 245 (1989 Soviet census). There are 4 streets.

== Geography ==
Gyugryag is located 8 km southwest of Khuchni (the district's administrative centre) by road. Dagni is the nearest rural locality.
