= Lyakhe =

Lyakhe Ляхе Ляхя
- Selo
- Location within Republic of Dagestan Location within Russia
- Coordinates: 41°57′N 47°54′E
- Country: Russia
- Region: Republic of Dagestan
- District: Tabasaransky District
- Time zone: UTC+3:00

Lyakhe (Russian: Ляхе; Tabassaran: Ляхя) is a rural locality (a selo) in Guriksky Selsoviet, Tabasaransky District, Republic of Dagestan, Russia. Population: 244 (2010 census); 252 (2002 census); 179 (1989 Soviet census). There are 2 streets.

== Geography ==
Lyakhe is located 15 km southeast of Khuchni (the district's administrative centre) by road. Firgil is the nearest rural locality.
