= Nichras =

Nichras Ничрас Ничӏрас
- Selo
- Location within Republic of Dagestan Location within Russia
- Coordinates: 41°50′N 48°00′E
- Country: Russia
- Region: Republic of Dagestan
- District: Tabasaransky District
- Time zone: UTC+3:00

Nichras (Russian: Ничрас; Tabassaran: Ничӏрас) is a rural locality (a selo) in Turagsky Selsoviet, Tabasaransky District, Republic of Dagestan, Russia. Population: 878 (2010 census); 284 (2002 census); 729 (1989 Soviet census). There are 5 streets.

== Geography ==
Nichras is located 17 km southeast of Khuchni (the district's administrative centre) by road. Zirdag is the nearest rural locality.
