= Khapil =

Khapil Хапиль Гьепӏил
- Selo
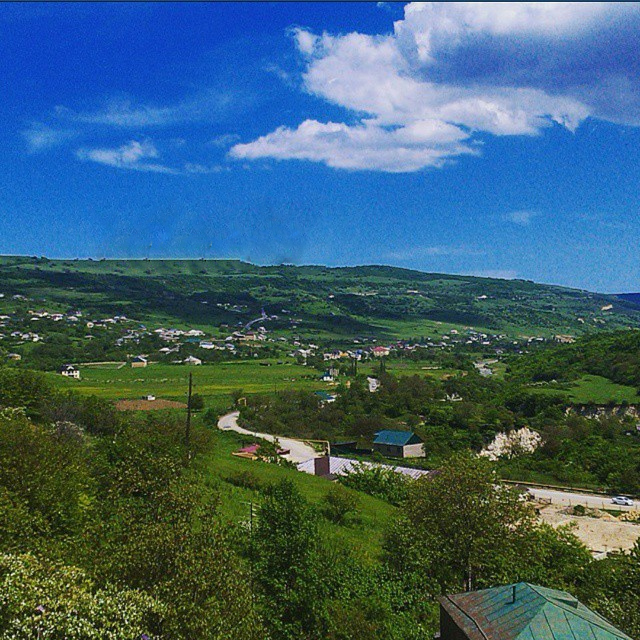
- Khapil village, Tabasaran district

- Location within Republic of Dagestan Location within Russia
- Coordinates: 41°59′N 47°58′E
- Country: Russia
- Region: Republic of Dagestan
- District: Tabasaransky District
- Time zone: UTC+3:00

Khapil (Russian: Хапиль; Tabassaran: Гьепӏил) is a rural locality (a selo) and the administrative centre of Khapilsky Selsoviet, Tabasaransky District, Republic of Dagestan, Russia. Population: 1,030 (2010 census); 1,241 (2002 census); 787 (1989 Soviet census). Khapil is made up of five streets.

== Geography ==
Khapil is located 6 km northeast of Khuchni (the district's administrative centre) by road. Tatil is the nearest rural locality.
