= Firgil =

Firgil Фиргиль Фуркӏил
- Selo
- Location within Republic of Dagestan Location within Russia
- Coordinates: 41°55′N 48°01′E
- Country: Russia
- Region: Republic of Dagestan
- District: Tabasaransky District
- Time zone: UTC+3:00

Firgil (Russian: Фиргиль; Tabassaran: Фуркӏил) is a rural locality (a selo) in Tinitsky Selsoviet, Tabasaransky District, Republic of Dagestan, Russia. Population: 396 (2010 census); 404 (2002 census); 268 (1989 Soviet census). There are 5 streets.

== Geography ==
Firgil is located 15 km southeast of Khuchni (the district's administrative centre) by road. Ushnyug is the nearest rural locality.
