= Yergyunyag =

Yergyunyag Ергюняг Ергюнигъ
- Selo
- Location within Republic of Dagestan Location within Russia
- Coordinates: 41°57′N 47°53′E
- Country: Russia
- Region: Republic of Dagestan
- District: Tabasaransky District
- Time zone: UTC+3:00

Yergyunyag (Russian: Ергюняг; Tabassaran: Ергюнигъ) is a rural locality (a selo) in Dzhuldzhagsky Selsoviet, Tabasaransky District, Republic of Dagestan, Russia. Population: 62 (2010 census); 49 (2002 census); 49 (1989 Soviet census).

== Geography ==
Yergyunyag is located 10 km northwest of Khuchni (the district's administrative centre) by road. Yurgulig is the nearest rural locality.
