= Gurkhun =

Gurkhun Гурхунь Гурхун
- Selo
- Location within Republic of Dagestan Location within Russia
- Coordinates: 42°01′N 47°55′E
- Country: Russia
- Region: Republic of Dagestan
- District: Tabasaransky District
- Time zone: UTC+3:00

Gurkhun (Russian: Гурхунь; Tabassaran: Гурхун) is a rural locality (a selo) in Dyubeksky Selsoviet, Tabasaransky District, Republic of Dagestan, Russia. Population: 484 (2010 census); 486 (2002 census); 340 (1989 Soviet census).

== Geography ==
Gurkhun is located 18 km north of Khuchni (the district's administrative centre) by road. Khustil is the nearest rural locality.
