= Yurgulig =

Yurgulig Юргулиг Юргюлигъ
- Selo
- Location within Republic of Dagestan Location within Russia
- Coordinates: 41°57′N 47°53′E
- Country: Russia
- Region: Republic of Dagestan
- District: Tabasaransky District
- Time zone: UTC+3:00

Yurgulig (Russian: Юргулиг; Tabassaran: Юргюлигъ) is a rural locality (a selo) in Dzhuldzhagsky Selsoviet, Tabasaransky District, Republic of Dagestan, Russia. Population: 293 (2010 census); 210 (2002 census); 137 (1989 Soviet census).

== Geography ==
Yurgulig is located 10 km west of Khuchni (the district's administrative centre) by road. Kulif and Dzhuldzhag are the nearest rural localities.
