= Lidzhe =

Lidzhe Лидже Лижва
- Selo
- Location within Republic of Dagestan Location within Russia
- Coordinates: 41°58′N 47°58′E
- Country: Russia
- Region: Republic of Dagestan
- District: Tabasaransky District
- Time zone: UTC+3:00

Lidzhe (Russian: Лидже; Tabassaran: Лижва) is a rural locality (a selo) in Araksky Selsoviet, Tabasaransky District, Republic of Dagestan, Russia. Population: 247 (2010 census); 261 (2002 census); 220 (1989 Soviet census). There are 3 streets.

== Geography ==
Lidzhe is located 11 km northeast of Khuchni (the district's administrative centre) by road. Khapil is the nearest rural locality.
