= Dzhuldzhag =

Dzhuldzhag Джульджаг Жулжагъ
- Selo
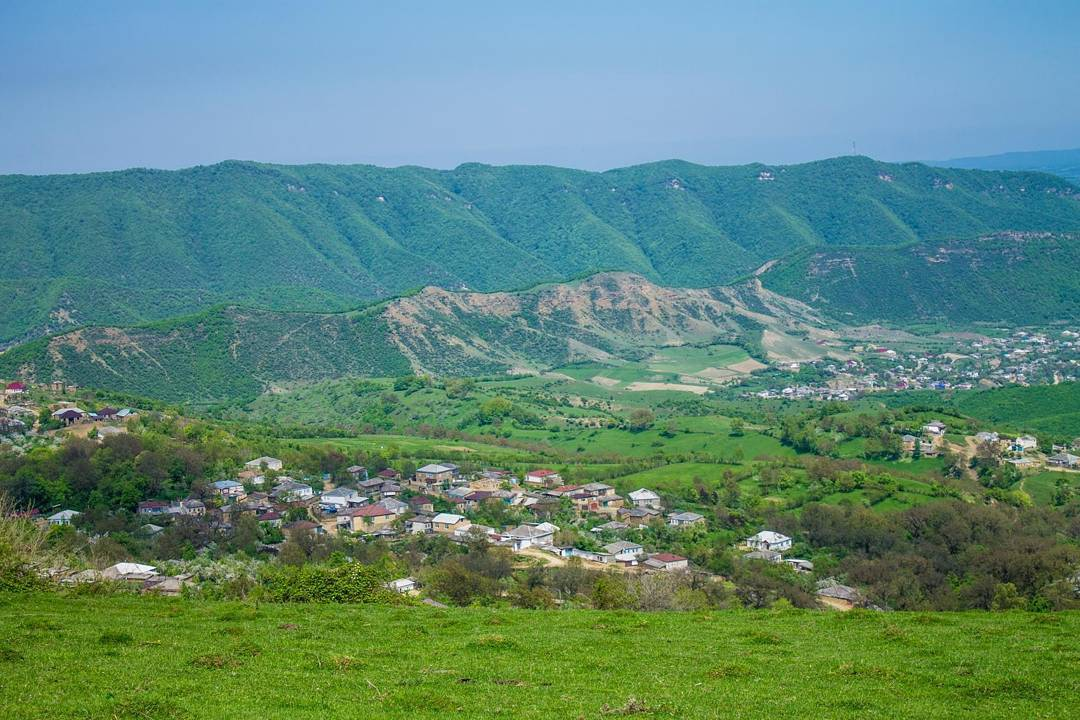

- Location within Republic of Dagestan Location within Russia
- Coordinates: 41°57′N 47°53′E
- Country: Russia
- Region: Republic of Dagestan
- District: Tabasaransky District
- Time zone: UTC+3:00

Dzhuldzhag (Russian: Джульджаг; Tabassaran: Жулжагъ) is a rural locality (a selo) and the administrative centre of Dzhuldzhagsky Selsoviet, Tabasaransky District, Republic of Dagestan, Russia. Population: 715 (2010 census); 612 (2002 census); 375 (1989 Soviet census).

== Geography ==
Dzhuldzhag is located 9 km west of Khuchni (the district's administrative centre) by road. Yurgulig is the nearest rural locality.
