= Burgankent =

Burgankent Бурганкент Бургьан гъул
- Selo
- Location within Republic of Dagestan Location within Russia
- Coordinates: 41°53′N 48°03′E
- Country: Russia
- Region: Republic of Dagestan
- District: Tabasaransky District
- Time zone: UTC+3:00

Burgankent (Russian: Бурганкент; Tabassaran: Бургьан гъул) is a rural locality (a selo) and the administrative centre of Burgankentsky Selsoviet, Tabasaransky District, Republic of Dagestan, Russia. Population: 704 (2010 census); 703 (2002 census); 626 (1989 Soviet census). There are 4 streets.

== Geography ==
Burgankent is located 20 km southeast of Khuchni (the district's administrative centre) by road. Tinit is the nearest rural locality.
