= Gurik, Republic of Dagestan =

Gurik Гурик Ккурихъ
- Selo
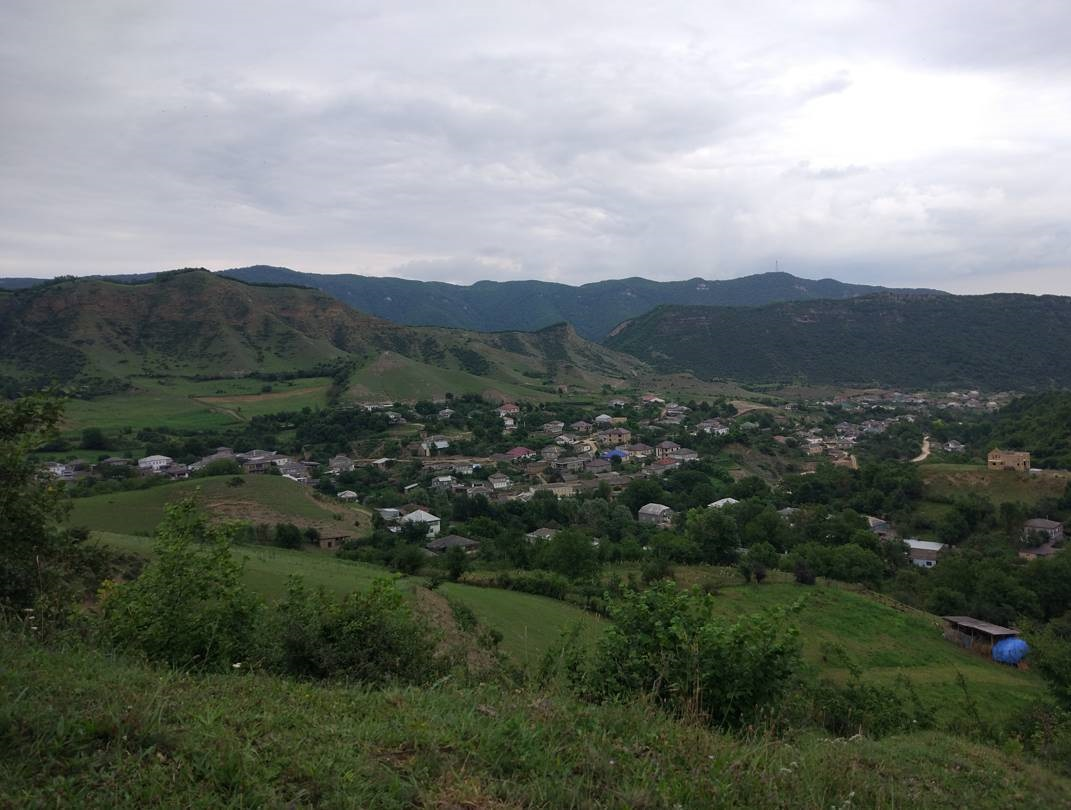

- Location within Republic of Dagestan Location within Russia
- Coordinates: 41°57′N 47°55′E
- Country: Russia
- Region: Republic of Dagestan
- District: Tabasaransky District
- Time zone: UTC+3:00

Gurik (Russian: Гурик; Tabassaran: Ккурихъ) is a rural locality (a selo) and the administrative centre of Guriksky Selsoviet, Tabasaransky District, Republic of Dagestan, Russia. Population: 804 (2010 census); 931 (2002 census); 709 (1989 Soviet census). There are 7 streets.

== Geography ==
Gurik is located 4 km northwest of Khuchni (the district's administrative centre) by road. Lyakhe is the nearest rural locality.
