= Tsurtil =

Tsurtil Цуртиль Цӏуртӏил
- Selo
- Location within Republic of Dagestan Location within Russia
- Coordinates: 41°55′N 47°55′E
- Country: Russia
- Region: Republic of Dagestan
- District: Tabasaransky District
- Time zone: UTC+3:00

Tsurtil (Russian: Цуртиль; Tabassaran: Цӏуртӏил) is a rural locality (a selo) in Khuchninsky Selsoviet, Tabasaransky District, Republic of Dagestan, Russia. Population: 344 (2010 census); 347 (2002 census); 312 (1989 Soviet census). There are 2 streets.

== Geography ==
Tsurtil is located 17 km south of Khuchni (the district's administrative centre) by road. Akka is the nearest rural locality.
