= Kyuryag =

Kuryag Кюряг Кюрягъ
- Selo
- Location within Republic of Dagestan Location within Russia
- Coordinates: 41°54′N 47°51′E
- Country: Russia
- Region: Republic of Dagestan
- District: Tabasaransky District
- Time zone: UTC+3:00

Kuryag (Russian: Кюряг; Tabassaran: Кюрягъ) is a rural locality (a selo) and the administrative centre of Guninsky Selsoviet, Tabasaransky District, Republic of Dagestan, Russia. Population: 451 (2010 census); 513 (2002 census); 220 (1989 Soviet census). There are 4 streets.

== Geography ==
Kyuryag is located 21 km southwest of Khuchni (the district's administrative centre) by road. Sikukh and Afna are the nearest rural localities.
