= Sertil =

Sertil Сертиль Сертӏил
- Selo
- Location within Republic of Dagestan Location within Russia
- Coordinates: 41°55′N 47°51′E
- Country: Russia
- Region: Republic of Dagestan
- District: Tabasaransky District
- Time zone: UTC+3:00

Sertil (Russian: Сертиль; Tabassaran: Сертӏил) is a rural locality (a selo) in Guninsky Selsoviet, Tabasaransky District, Republic of Dagestan, Russia. Population: 400 (2010 census); 368 (2002 census); 280 (1989 Soviet census). There are 4 streets.

== Geography ==
Sertil is located 18 km southwest of Khuchni (the district's administrative centre) by road. Guvlig is the nearest rural locality.
