= Ushnyug =

Ushnyug Ушнюг Гьемшнигъ
- Selo
- Location within Republic of Dagestan Location within Russia
- Coordinates: 41°55′N 48°00′E
- Country: Russia
- Region: Republic of Dagestan
- District: Tabasaransky District
- Time zone: UTC+3:00

Ushnyug (Russian: Ушнюг; Tabassaran: Гьемшнигъ) is a rural locality (a selo) in Arkitsky Selsoviet, Tabasaransky District, Republic of Dagestan, Russia. Population: 270 (2010 census); 326 (2002 census); 238 (1989 Soviet census).

== Geography ==
Ushnyug is located 9 km southeast of Khuchni (the district's administrative centre) by road. Firgil, Tsukhdyg and Dzhugdil are the nearest rural localities.
