= Dzhuli =

Dzhuli Джули Жвулли
- Selo
- Location within Republic of Dagestan Location within Russia
- Coordinates: 41°52′N 47°51′E
- Country: Russia
- Region: Republic of Dagestan
- District: Tabasaransky District
- Time zone: UTC+3:00

Dzhuli (Russian: Джули; Tabassaran: Жвулли) is a rural locality (a selo) in Khalagsky Selsoviet, Tabasaransky District, Republic of Dagestan, Russia. Population: 628 (2010 census); 719 (2002 census); 453 (1989 Soviet census). There are 4 streets.

== Geography ==
Dzhuli is located 23 km southwest of Khuchni (the district's administrative centre) by road. Vertil is the nearest rural locality.
