= Dzhugdil =

Dzhugdil Джугдиль Жугътӏил
- Selo
- Location within Republic of Dagestan Location within Russia
- Coordinates: 41°55′N 47°58′E
- Country: Russia
- Region: Republic of Dagestan
- District: Tabasaransky District
- Time zone: UTC+3:00

Dzhugdil (Russian: Джугдиль; Tabassaran: Жугътӏил) is a rural locality (a selo) in Kurkaksky Selsoviet, Tabasaransky District, Republic of Dagestan, Russia. Population: 916 (2010 census); 951 (2002 census); There are 3 streets.

== Geography ==
Dzhugdil is located 6 km southeast of Khuchni (the district's administrative centre) by road. Kurkak is the nearest rural locality.
