= Kuvag =

Kuvag Куваг Кувагъ
- Selo
- Location within Republic of Dagestan Location within Russia
- Coordinates: 41°55′N 47°54′E
- Country: Russia
- Region: Republic of Dagestan
- District: Tabasaransky District
- Time zone: UTC+3:00

Kuvag (Russian: Куваг; Tabassaran: Кувагъ) is a rural locality (a selo) in Guriksky Selsoviet, Tabasaransky District, Republic of Dagestan, Russia. Population: 101 (2010 census); 147 (2002 census); 113 (1989 Soviet census).

== Geography ==
Kuvag is located 13 km southwest of Khuchni (the district's administrative centre) by road. Dagni is the nearest rural locality.
