= Turuf =

Turuf Туруф Туриф
- Selo
- Location within Republic of Dagestan Location within Russia
- Coordinates: 41°54′N 48°00′E
- Country: Russia
- Region: Republic of Dagestan
- District: Tabasaransky District
- Time zone: UTC+3:00

Turuf (Russian: Туруф; Tabassaran: Туриф) is a rural locality (a selo) in Tinitsky Selsoviet, Tabasaransky District, Republic of Dagestan, Russia. Population: 389 (2010 census); 517 (2002 census); 469 (1989 Soviet census). There are 8 streets.

== Geography ==
Turuf is located 11 km southeast of Khuchni (the district's administrative centre) by road. Dzhugdil is the nearest rural locality.
