= Gasik =

Gasik Гасик Гьесихъ
- Selo
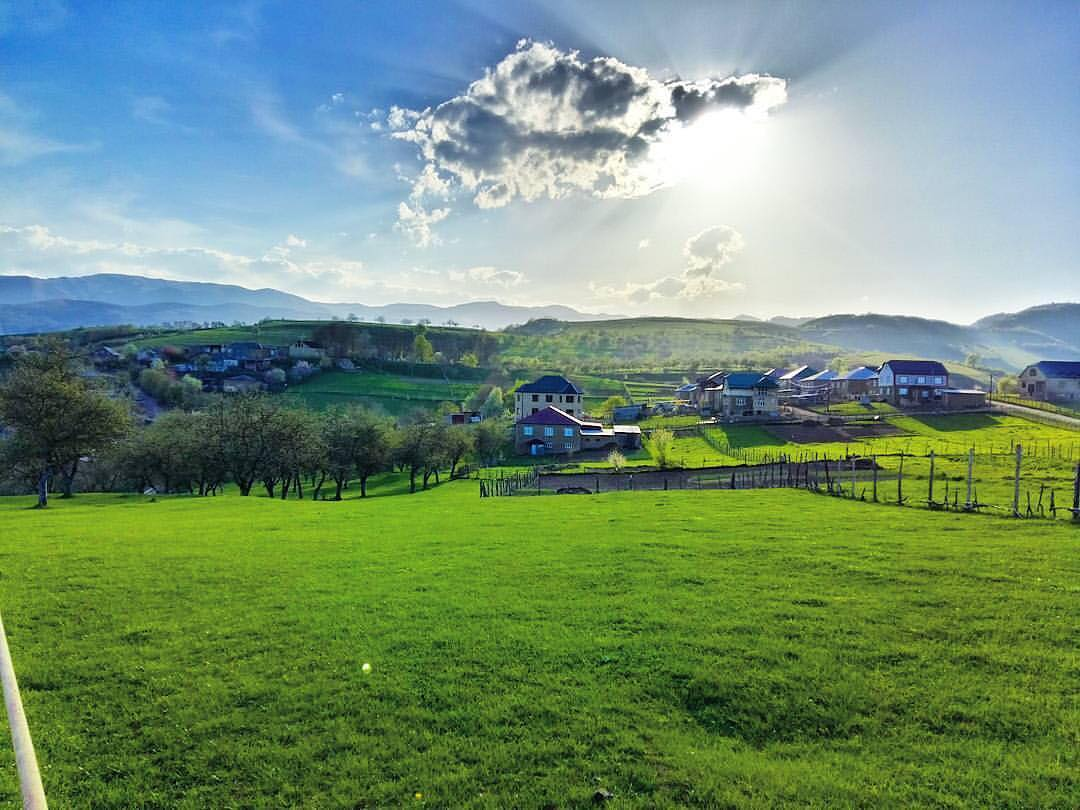
- A village in the Tabasaran District, Republic of Dagestan

- Location within Republic of Dagestan Location within Russia
- Coordinates: 41°55′N 47°53′E
- Country: Russia
- Region: Republic of Dagestan
- District: Tabasaransky District
- Time zone: UTC+3:00

Gasik (Russian: Гасик; Tabassaran: Гьесихъ) is a rural locality (a selo) in Dzhuldzhagsky Selsoviet, Tabasaransky District, Republic of Dagestan, Russia. Population: 403 (2010 census); 365 (2002 census); 322 (1989 Soviet census).

== Geography ==
Gasik is located 15 km southwest of Khuchni (the district's administrative centre) by road. Kuvag is the nearest rural locality.
