= Yagdyg, Republic of Dagestan =

Yagdyg Ягдыг Ягъдыгъ
- Selo
- Location within Republic of Dagestan Location within Russia
- Coordinates: 41°58′N 47°58′E
- Country: Russia
- Region: Republic of Dagestan
- District: Tabasaransky District
- Time zone: UTC+3:00

Yagdyg (Russian: Ягдыг; Tabassaran: Ягъдыгъ) is a rural locality (a selo) in Khuchninsky Selsoviet, Tabasaransky District, Republic of Dagestan, Russia. Population: 989 (2010 census); 1,099 (2002 census); 810 (1989 Soviet census). There are 2 streets.

== Geography ==
Yagdyg is located 5 km northeast of Khuchni (the district's administrative centre) by road. Tatil is the nearest rural locality.
