= Bukhnag =

Bukhnag Бухнаг Бухьнагъ
- Selo
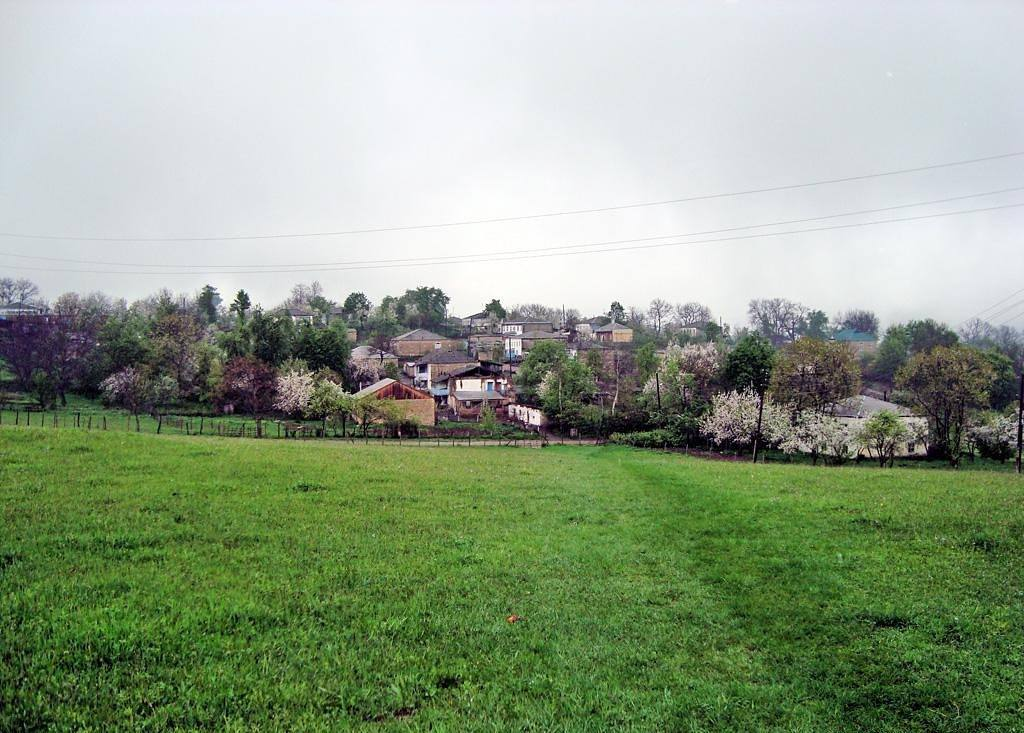

- Location within Republic of Dagestan Location within Russia
- Coordinates: 41°54′N 47°52′E
- Country: Russia
- Region: Republic of Dagestan
- District: Tabasaransky District
- Time zone: UTC+3:00

Bukhnag (Russian: Бухнаг; Tabassaran: Бухьнагъ) is a rural locality (a selo) in Khalagsky Selsoviet, Tabasaransky District, Republic of Dagestan, Russia. The population was 194 as of 2010.

== Geography ==
Bukhnag is located 19 km (12 mi) southwest of Khuchni (the district's administrative centre) by road. Khalag is the nearest rural locality.
