= Tsukhdyg =

Tsukhdyg Цухдыг Цухтигъ
- Selo
- Location within Republic of Dagestan Location within Russia
- Coordinates: 41°56′N 47°58′E
- Country: Russia
- Region: Republic of Dagestan
- District: Tabasaransky District
- Time zone: UTC+3:00

Tsukhdyg (Russian: Цухдыг; Tabassaran: Цухтигъ) is a rural locality (a selo) in Araksky Selsoviet, Tabasaransky District, Republic of Dagestan, Russia. Population: 653 (2010 census); 693 (2002 census); 475 (1989 Soviet census). There are 5 streets.

== Geography ==
Tsukhdyg is located 5 km southeast of Khuchni (the district's administrative centre) by road. Ushnyug is the nearest rural locality.
