= Kharag =

Kharag Хараг Хьарагъ
- Selo
- Location within Republic of Dagestan Location within Russia
- Coordinates: 41°56′N 47°49′E
- Country: Russia
- Region: Republic of Dagestan
- District: Tabasaransky District
- Time zone: UTC+3:00

Kharag (Russian: Хараг; Tabassaran: Хьарагъ) is a rural locality (a selo) in Kuzhniksky Selsoviet, Tabasaransky District, Republic of Dagestan, Russia. Population: 500 (2010 census); 358 (2002 census); 296 (1989 Soviet census). There are 3 streets.

== Geography ==
Kharag is located 16 km west of Khuchni (the district's administrative centre) by road. Shile is the nearest rural locality.
