= Tatil, Republic of Dagestan =

Tatil Татиль Тӏаттил
- Selo
- Location within Republic of Dagestan Location within Russia
- Coordinates: 41°59′N 47°59′E
- Country: Russia
- Region: Republic of Dagestan
- District: Tabasaransky District
- Time zone: UTC+3:00

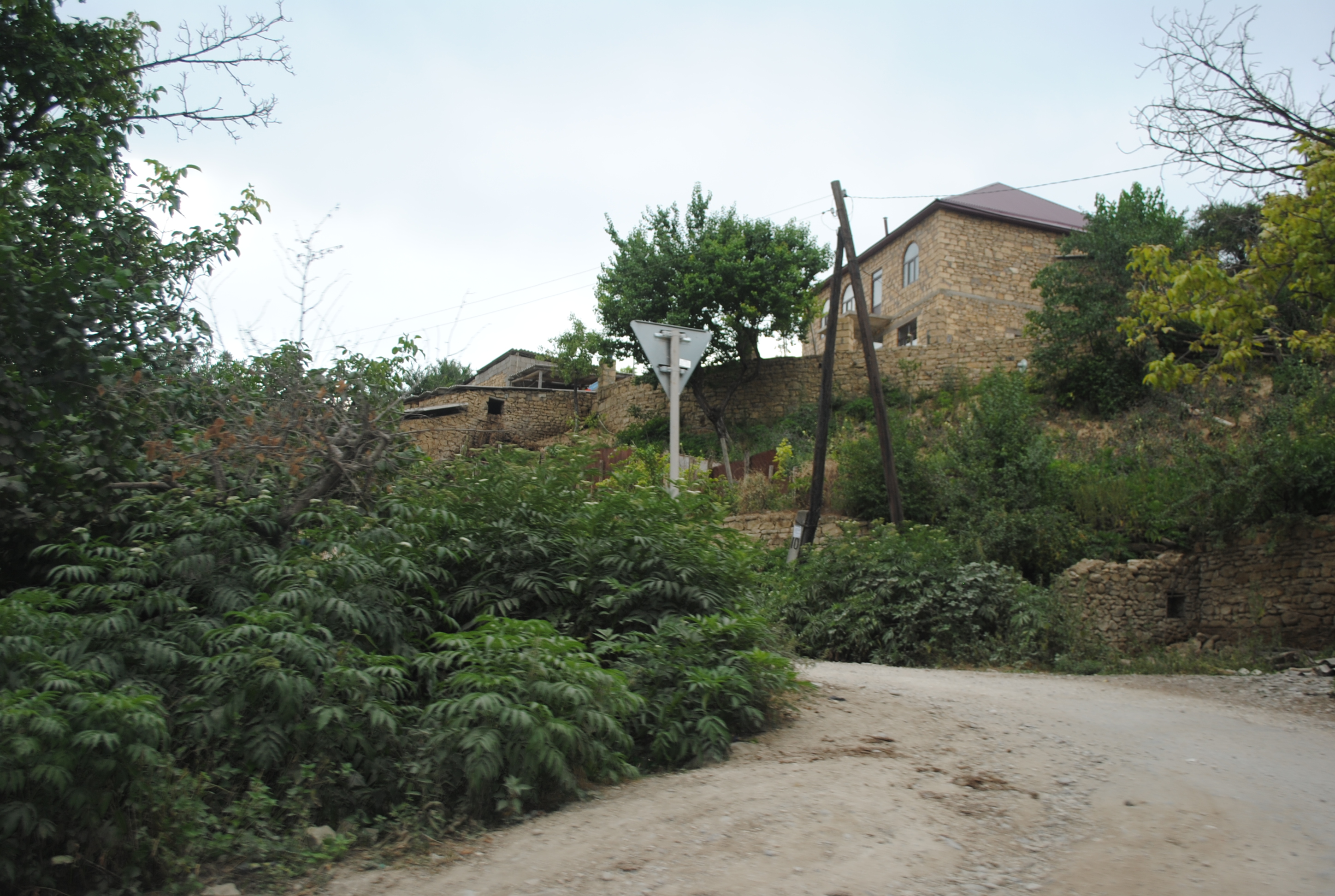
Tatil

Tatil (Russian: Татиль; Tabassaran: Тӏаттил) is a rural locality (a selo) in Khapilsky Selsoviet, Tabasaransky District, Republic of Dagestan, Russia. Population: 1,132 (2010 census); 1,152 (2002 census); 871 (1989 Soviet census). There are 7 streets.

== Geography ==
Tatil is located 7 km northeast of Khuchni (the district's administrative centre) by road. Khapil is the nearest rural locality.
