= Vechrik =

Vechrik Вечрик Вечрикк
- Selo
- Location within Republic of Dagestan Location within Russia
- Coordinates: 41°54′N 47°57′E
- Country: Russia
- Region: Republic of Dagestan
- District: Tabasaransky District
- Time zone: UTC+3:00

Vechrik (Russian: Вечрик; Tabassaran: Вечрикк) is a rural locality (a selo) in Kurkaksky Selsoviet, Tabasaransky District, Republic of Dagestan, Russia. Population: 292 (2010 census); 399 (2002 census); 233 (1989 Soviet census).

== Geography ==
Vechrik is located 7 km south of Khuchni (the district's administrative centre) by road. Dzhugdil is the nearest rural locality.
