= Khurik, Republic of Dagestan =

Khurik Хурик Хюрикк
- Selo
- Location within Republic of Dagestan Location within Russia
- Coordinates: 41°59′N 47°53′E
- Country: Russia
- Region: Republic of Dagestan
- District: Tabasaransky District
- Time zone: UTC+3:00

Khurik (Russian: Хурик; Tabassaran: Хюрикк) is a rural locality (a selo) and the administrative centre of Khuriksky Selsoviet, Tabasaransky District, Republic of Dagestan, Russia. Population: 2,530 (2010 census); 2,357 (2002 census); 1,659 (1989 Soviet census). There are 8 streets.

== Geography ==
By road, Khurik is located 8 km northwest of Khuchni (the district's administrative centre). Rugudzh is the nearest rural locality.
