= Rugudzh =

Rugudzh Ругудж Ругуж
- Selo
- Location within Republic of Dagestan Location within Russia
- Coordinates: 41°58′N 47°53′E
- Country: Russia
- Region: Republic of Dagestan
- District: Tabasaransky District
- Time zone: UTC+3:00

Rugudzh (Russian: Ругудж; Tabassaran: Ругуж) is a rural locality (a selo) in Khuriksky Selsoviet, Tabasaransky District, Republic of Dagestan, Russia. Population: 813 (2010 census); 1,001 (2002 census); 646 (1989 Soviet census).

== Geography ==
Rugudzh is located 7 km northwest of Khuchni (the district's administrative centre) by road. Khanag is the nearest rural locality.
