= Kurkak =

Kurkak Куркак Куркакк
- Selo
- Location within Republic of Dagestan Location within Russia
- Coordinates: 41°54′N 47°58′E
- Country: Russia
- Region: Republic of Dagestan
- District: Tabasaransky District
- Time zone: UTC+3:00

Kurkak (Russian: Куркак; Tabassaran: Куркакк) is a rural locality (a selo) and the administrative centre of Kurkaksky Selsoviet, Tabasaransky District, Republic of Dagestan, Russia. Population: 268 (2010 census); 175 (2002 census); 776 (1989 Soviet census).

== Geography ==
Kurkak is located 7 km southeast of Khuchni (the district's administrative centre) by road. Dzhugdil is the nearest rural locality.
