= Gumi, Republic of Dagestan =

Gumi Гуми Ккуми
- Selo
- Location within Republic of Dagestan Location within Russia
- Coordinates: 41°53′N 47°52′E
- Country: Russia
- Region: Republic of Dagestan
- District: Tabasaransky District
- Time zone: UTC+3:00

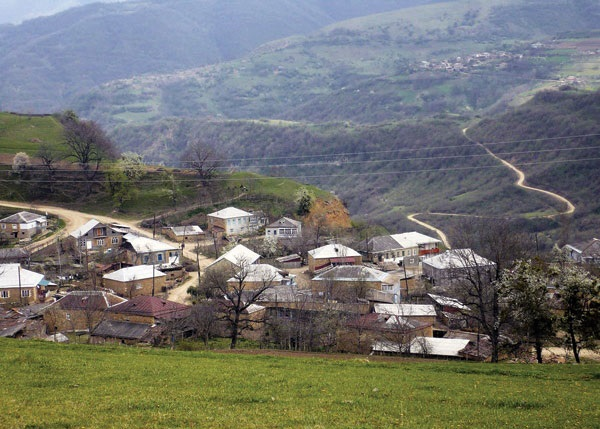
Village in Tabasaran district of Dagestan

Gumi (Russian: Гуми; Tabassaran: Ккуми) is a rural locality (a selo) in Guninsky Selsoviet, Tabasaransky District, Republic of Dagestan, Russia. Population: 258 (2010 census); 310 (2002 census); 227 (1989 Soviet census). There are 3 streets.

== Geography ==
Gumi is located 20 km southwest of Khuchni (the district's administrative centre) by road. Afna is the nearest rural locality.
