= Rushchul =

Rushchul Рущуль Рушв'ил
- Selo
- Location within Republic of Dagestan Location within Russia
- Coordinates: 41°57′N 48°00′E
- Country: Russia
- Region: Republic of Dagestan
- District: Tabasaransky District
- Time zone: UTC+3:00

Rushchul (Russian: Рущуль; Tabassaran: Рушв'ил) is a rural locality (a selo) in Arkitsky Selsoviet, Tabasaransky District, Republic of Dagestan, Russia. Population: 457 (2010 census); 591 (2002 census); 490 (1989 Soviet census).

== Geography ==
Rushchul is located 10 km east of Khuchni (the district's administrative centre) by road. Arkit is the nearest rural locality.
