= Khanag =

Khanag Ханаг Хянягъ
- Selo
- Location within Republic of Dagestan Location within Russia
- Coordinates: 41°58′N 47°53′E
- Country: Russia
- Region: Republic of Dagestan
- District: Tabasaransky District
- Time zone: UTC+3:00

Khanag (Russian: Ханаг; Tabassaran: Хянягъ) is a rural locality (a selo) in Khuriksky Selsoviet, Tabasaransky District, Republic of Dagestan, Russia. Population: 626 (2010 census); 707 (2002 census); 536 (1989 Soviet census).

== Geography ==
Khanag is located 7 km northwest of Khuchni (the district's administrative centre) by road. Rugudzh is the nearest rural locality.
