= Shile, Republic of Dagestan =

Shile Шиле Шилла
- Selo
- Location within Republic of Dagestan Location within Russia
- Coordinates: 41°56′N 47°49′E
- Country: Russia
- Region: Republic of Dagestan
- District: Tabasaransky District
- Time zone: UTC+3:00

Shile (Russian: Шиле; Tabassaran: Шилла) is a rural locality (a selo) in Kuzhniksky Selsoviet, Tabasaransky District, Republic of Dagestan, Russia. As of the 2010 census, its population was 207 people, with 269 people in the 2002 census and 218 in the 1989 census. There are 3 streets.

== Geography ==
Shile is located 15 km west of Khuchni (the district's administrative centre) by road. Kharag is the nearest rural locality.
