= Kuzhnik =

Kuzhnik Кужник Къужник
- Selo
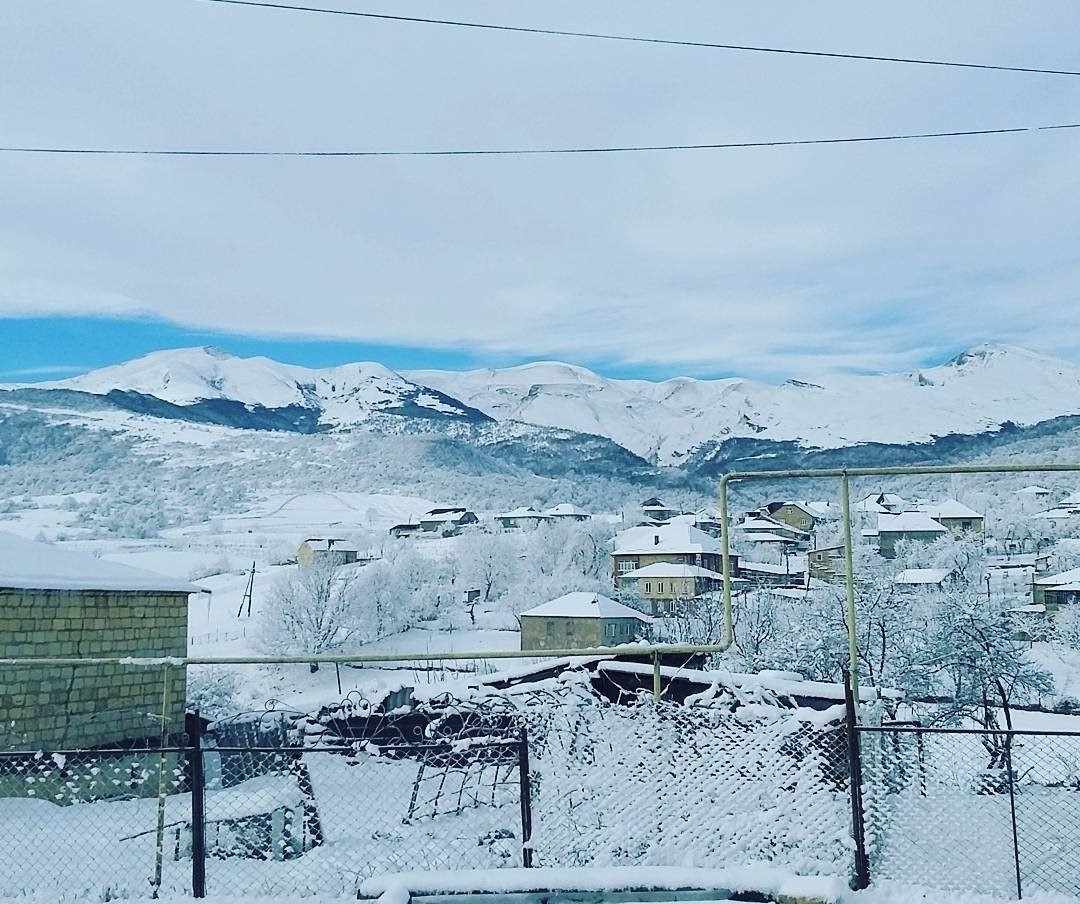

- Location within Republic of Dagestan Location within Russia
- Coordinates: 41°57′N 47°49′E
- Country: Russia
- Region: Republic of Dagestan
- District: Tabasaransky District
- Time zone: UTC+3:00

Kuzhnik (Russian: Кужник; Tabassaran: Къужник) is a rural locality (a selo) in Kuzhniksky Selsoviet, Tabasaransky District, Republic of Dagestan, Russia. Population: 851 (2010 census); 893 (2002 census); 609 (1989 Soviet census). There are 6 streets.

== Geography ==
Kuzhnik is located 16 km west of Khuchni (the district's administrative centre) by road. Uluz is the nearest rural locality.
