= Khustil =

Khustil Хустиль Хустӏил
- Selo
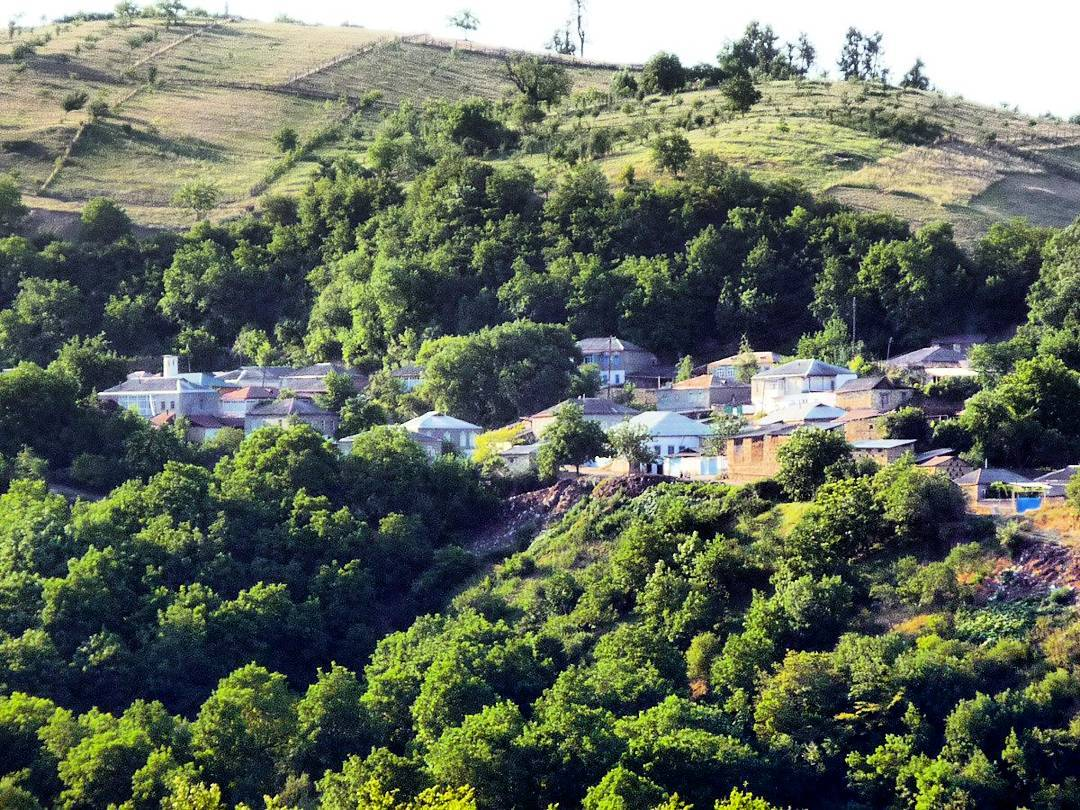

- Location within Republic of Dagestan Location within Russia
- Coordinates: 42°00′N 47°56′E
- Country: Russia
- Region: Republic of Dagestan
- District: Tabasaransky District
- Time zone: UTC+3:00

Khustil (Russian: Хустиль; Tabassaran: Хустӏил) is a rural locality (a selo) in Dyubeksky Selsoviet, Tabasaransky District, Republic of Dagestan, Russia. Population: 594 (2010 census); 598 (2002 census); 478 (1989 Soviet census). There are 3 streets.

== Geography ==
Khustil is located 18 km north of Khuchni (the district's administrative centre) by road. Gurkhun is the nearest rural locality.
