= Tinit =

Tinit Тинит ТинитI
- Selo
- Location within Republic of Dagestan Location within Russia
- Coordinates: 41°54′N 48°03′E
- Country: Russia
- Region: Republic of Dagestan
- District: Tabasaransky District
- Time zone: UTC+3:00

Tinit (Russian: Тинит; Tabassaran: ТинитI) is a rural locality (a selo) and the administrative centre of Tinitsky Selsoviet, Tabasaransky District, Republic of Dagestan, Russia. Population: 1,384 (2010 census); 1,600 (2002 census); 1,369 (1989 Soviet census). There are 12 streets.

== Geography ==
Tinit is located 18 km southeast of Khuchni (the district's administrative centre) by road. Burgankent is the nearest rural locality.
