= Sirtich =

Sirtich Сиртич
- Selo
- Location within Republic of Dagestan Location within Russia
- Coordinates: 41°50′N 48°13′E
- Country: Russia
- Region: Republic of Dagestan
- District: Tabasaransky District
- Time zone: UTC+3:00

Sirtich (Russian: Сиртич) is a rural locality (a selo) in Tabasaransky District, Republic of Dagestan, Russia. Population: 3,871 (2021 census); 2,596 (2002 census); 1,413 (1989 Soviet census). There are 24 streets.

== Geography ==
Sirtich is located 40 km southeast of Khuchni (the district's administrative centre) by road. Gyukhryag and Syugyut are the nearest rural localities.
