= Khanak, Republic of Dagestan =

Khanak Ханак
- Selo
- Location within Republic of Dagestan Location within Russia
- Coordinates: 41°54′N 47°51′E
- Country: Russia
- Region: Republic of Dagestan
- District: Tabasaransky District
- Time zone: UTC+3:00

Khanak (Russian: Ханак) is a rural locality (a selo) in Guninsky Selsoviet, Tabasaransky District, Republic of Dagestan, Russia. Population: 280 (2010 census); 312 (2002 census); 188 (1989 Soviet census). There are 4 streets.

== Geography ==
Khanak is located 20 km southwest of Khuchni (the district's administrative centre) by road. Bukhnag is the nearest rural locality.
