= Kyurek =

Kyurek Кюрек
- Selo
- Location within Republic of Dagestan Location within Russia
- Coordinates: 41°57′N 47°51′E
- Country: Russia
- Region: Republic of Dagestan
- District: Tabasaransky District
- Time zone: UTC+3:00

Kyurek (Russian: Кюрек) is a rural locality (a selo) in Kuzhniksky Selsoviet, Tabasaransky District, Republic of Dagestan, Russia. Population: 93 (2010 census); 105 (2002 census); 79 (1989 Soviet census).

== Geography ==
Kyurek is located 14 km west of Khuchni (the district's administrative centre) by road. Churdaf is the nearest rural locality.
