= Afna =

Afna Афна
- Selo
- Location within Republic of Dagestan Location within Russia
- Coordinates: 41°54′N 47°51′E
- Country: Russia
- Region: Republic of Dagestan
- District: Tabasaransky District
- Time zone: UTC+3:00

Afna (Russian: Афна) is a rural locality (a selo) in Guninsky Selsoviet, Tabasaransky District, Republic of Dagestan, Russia. Population: 190 (2010 census); 232 (2002 census); 193 (1989 Soviet census). There are 2 streets.

== Geography ==
Afna is located 22 km (14 mi) southwest of Khuchni (the district's administrative centre) by road. Gumi is the nearest rural locality.
