= Sika, Republic of Dagestan =

Sika Сика
- Selo
- Location within Republic of Dagestan Location within Russia
- Coordinates: 41°53′N 47°58′E
- Country: Russia
- Region: Republic of Dagestan
- District: Tabasaransky District
- Time zone: UTC+3:00

Sika (Russian: Сика) is a rural locality (a selo) in Kurkaksky Selsoviet, Tabasaransky District, Republic of Dagestan, Russia. Population: 113 (2010 census); 187 (2002 census); 122 (1989 Soviet census).

== Geography ==
Sika is located 11 km southeast of Khuchni (the district's administrative centre) by road.
