= Khoshmenzil =

Khoshmenzil Хошмензиль Хошмемзил
- Village
- Location within Republic of Dagestan Location within Russia
- Coordinates: 41°53′47″N 48°20′13″E
- Country: Russia
- Region: Republic of Dagestan
- District: Derbentsky District

Population
  - Total: 0
- Time zone: UTC+03:00

Khoshmenzil, also known as Khosh-Menzil (Russian: Хошмензиль; Judeo-Tat: Хошмемзил) is an abolished village in the Derbentsky District of Dagestan. In 1972 it was included in the village of Rubas.

== Geography ==
It was located on the left bank of the Rubas River, near the intersection of the river with the Caucasus Federal Highway. Currently, it represents the eastern part of the village of Rubas.

== Etymology ==
Translated from Turkic languages, “khosh manzil” means a good place or a pleasant place.

== History ==
Khoshmenzil is one of the historical places of residence of Mountain Jews in Dagestan. After the final annexation of Dagestan to Russia, the village of Khosh-Menzil became part of the Ullu mahallah of the South Tabasaransky nawab. It later became part of the Kyurinsky district of the Dagestan region. The Mountain Jewish population of the village of Khoshmenzil was replenished at the beginning of the twentieth century at the expense of the residents of the village of Molla-Khalil. And in the 1910s, Ukrainian immigrants from the Poltava province settled higher up the river. The village was devastated during the Russian Civil War. With the final establishment of Soviet Union power, the village became part of the newly formed Kullar village council of the Maskut section of the Kyurinsky district. Since 1921 as part of the Derbentsky district. Already in 1920, 3 agricultural artels were organized in the village.

In 1927, the center of the Kullar village council was moved to the village of Khosh-Menzil, and the village council was accordingly renamed Khosh-Menzil.

According to archival data for 1929, the village of Khosh-Menzil consisted of 82 households, and administratively it was the center of the Khosh-Menzil village council of the Derbentsky region. The village council also included the villages of Aglobi and Kullar, railway passing siding and barracks in Arablinskoye.

In 1930, a kolkhoz named after the Third International was organized, which in 1965 was transformed into the “Lenin's Way” sovkhoz. Apparently, in the early 1930s, a part inhabited by Russians and Ukrainians separated from the village and formed the Rubas farmstead. As of 1939, the village was the center of the Khoshmenzil village council, it also included the village of Aglobi, the hamlets of Third International and Rubas, the Arablinskoye station, the settlements of Bayatlar, Derbent-kala, Kullar, Muzaim, Turpak-Kala and Khuzayan, and the Smidovich farm.

Starting from the 1930s, Azerbaijanis and Tabasarans from the Tabasaransky region began to move into the village, and the Mountain Jewish population, in turn, began to leave the village and move to Derbent.

By the 1950s, almost all Mountain Jews left the village.

In 1972, the village of Khoshmenzil was included in the expanding village of Rubas.

== Population ==
Statistical population
Year	1886	1895	1926	1939	1970
population	189	186	312	199	370

According to archival data from 1886, Mountain Jews (77%) and Tatars (23%) lived in the village. According to the 1926 Soviet census, Mountain Jews (65%), Russians (23%), Ukrainians (9%) and Turks (2%) lived in the village.

== Notable residents ==
- Gyulboor Davydova (1892–1983), Soviet winegrower, manager of the collective farm named after Kaganovich, Hero of Socialist Labour (1949).
