= Sikukh =

Sikukh Сикух
- Selo
- Location within Republic of Dagestan Location within Russia
- Coordinates: 41°54′N 47°50′E
- Country: Russia
- Region: Republic of Dagestan
- District: Tabasaransky District
- Time zone: UTC+3:00

Sikukh (Russian: Сикух) is a rural locality (a selo) in Guninsky Selsoviet, Tabasaransky District, Republic of Dagestan, Russia. Population: 200 (2010 census); 195 (2002 census); 156 (1989 Soviet census). There are 2 streets.

== Geography ==
Sikukh is located 21 km southwest of Khuchni (the district's administrative centre) by road. Kyuryag is the nearest rural locality.
