= Rubas River =

Rubas Rubaschay

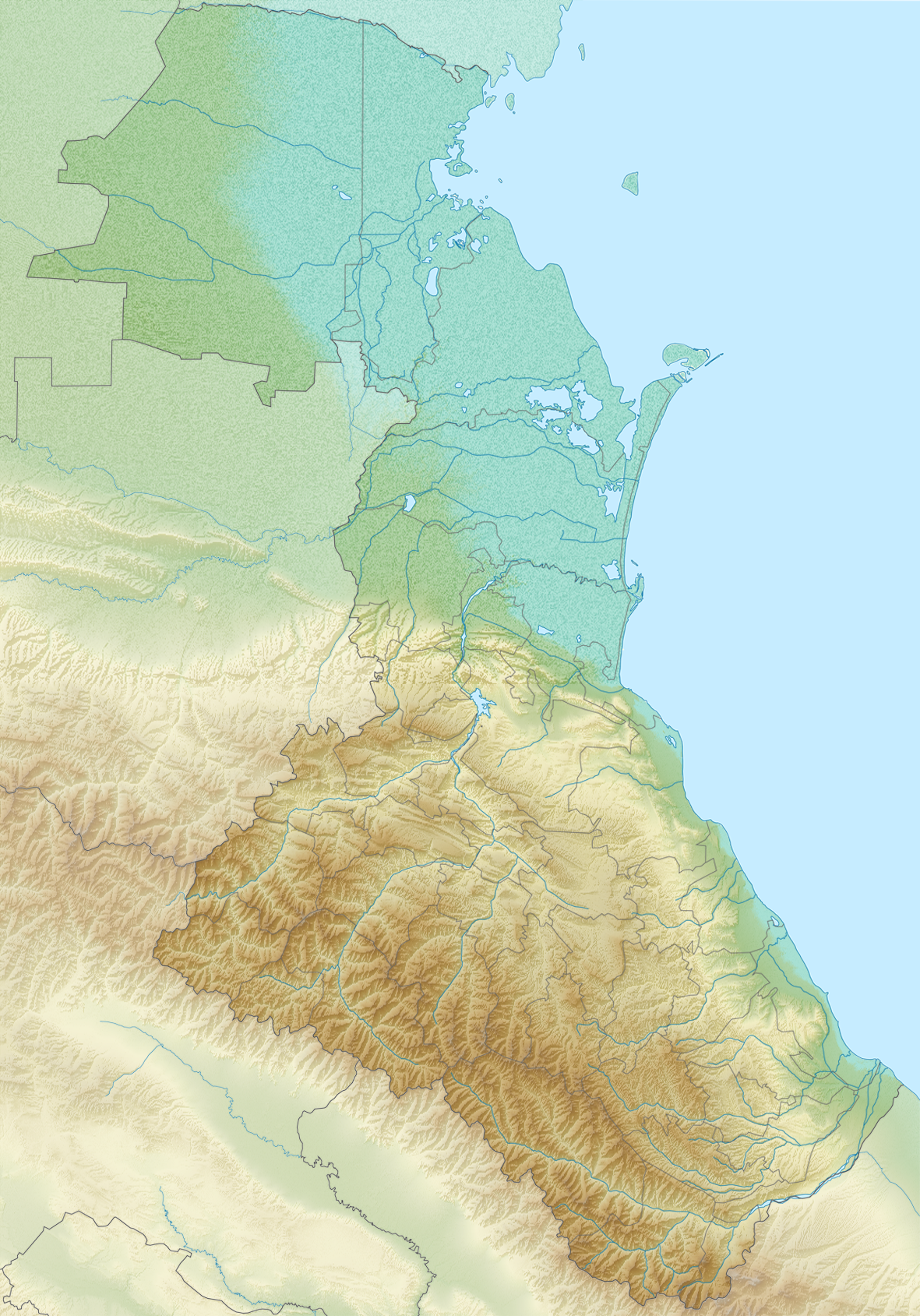
- Location within Caucasus Mountains Location within Republic of Dagestan
- Native name: Рубас (Russian)

Location
- Countries: Russia
- Region: Caucasus
- Village: Rubas

Physical characteristics
- Source: Main Caucasian Range; Greater Caucasus
  - location: Tabasaransky, Kurakhsky, and Derbentsky Districts, Dagestan, Russia
  - coordinates: 41°54′09″N 47°42′10″E
  - elevation: 28 m (92 ft)
- Mouth
  - location: Caspian Sea
  - coordinates: 41°56′14″N 48°23′05″E
- Length: 92 km (57 mi)
- Basin size: 1,180 km^{2} (460 sq mi)
- Discharge
  - average: 593 m^{3}/s (20,900 cu ft/s)

Basin features
- Tributaries
  - left: Afnachay, Khanagchay, Karchag-Su, and Kamyshchay
  - right: Samur–Derbent Canal

Rubas (Russian: Рубас), also known as Rubaschay, is a river flowing through the Tabasaransky, Kurakhsky, and Derbentsky districts of Dagestan.

The river is 92 km long. The area of its drainage basin is 1,180 km^{2}.

== Geography ==
It originates from springs on the northeastern slope of one of the ridges of Inner Dagestan, 3.4 km southeast of Mount Dzhufu-Dag, and flows into the Caspian Sea near the villages of Arablyar and Mollakent.

== Hydrology ==
The river has a flood regime during the warm season and low water levels in winter. The highest annual discharges usually occur following rainfall. Summer rain floods can sometimes be catastrophic. The mean annual discharge is 1.01 m^{3}/s, while the maximum is 59.3 m^{3}/s.

== Tributaries ==
The largest tributaries are the Afnachay, Khanagchay, Karchag-Su, and Kamyshchay. In its lower reaches, water from the Samur–Derbent Canal is periodically discharged into the river.

== Study of the river and its significance for water management ==
The river has been studied at the Khuchni and Rubas stream gauges. Its waters are used for irrigation; the canal named after Valerian Kuybyshev begins 3 km upstream from the village of Rubas.

== Archaeology ==
Near the village of Chulat, approximately 3 km upstream on the river's right bank, lies Rubas-1, a multilayered Paleolithic archaeological site. Its oldest archaeological layer has been tentatively dated to approximately 2.2–2.3 million years ago.

The site has been dated to approximately 1.5 ± 0.04 million years ago based on an ash horizon in the Rubas River landslide deposits.

A group of archaeological sites known as Shor-Dore-1–6 is located near the confluence of the Karchag-Su River and Rubas rivers. The sites date to the Late Baku period (approximately 400,000–300,000 years ago).

== Battle of Rubas River ==
In 1579, a battle took place on the Rubas River between the Ottoman army, commanded by Özdemiroğlu Osman Pasha, and the Kaitag Utsmiate.

== See also ==
- Battle of Rubas River, 1579
