= Tsantil =

Tsantil Цантиль
- Selo
- Location within Republic of Dagestan Location within Russia
- Coordinates: 41°58′N 47°51′E
- Country: Russia
- Region: Republic of Dagestan
- District: Tabasaransky District
- Time zone: UTC+3:00

Tsantil (Russian: Цантиль) is a rural locality (a selo) in Khuriksky Selsoviet, Tabasaransky District, Republic of Dagestan, Russia. Population: 285 (2010 census); 334 (2002 census); 244 (1989 Soviet census).

== Geography ==
Tsantil is located 12 km northwest of Khuchni (the district's administrative centre) by road. Pilig is the nearest rural locality.
