= Kharkhni =

Kharkhni Хархни
- Selo
- Location within Republic of Dagestan Location within Russia
- Coordinates: 41°56′N 47°52′E
- Country: Russia
- Region: Republic of Dagestan
- District: Tabasaransky District
- Time zone: UTC+3:00

Kharkhni (Russian: Хархни) is a rural locality (a selo) in Dzhuldzhagsky Selsoviet, Tabasaransky District, Republic of Dagestan, Russia. Population: 99 (2010 census); 86 (2002 census); 73 (1989 Soviet census).

== Geography ==
Kharkhni is located 12 km west of Khuchni (the district's administrative centre) by road. Dzhuldzhag, Churdaf and Gasik are the nearest rural localities.
