= Uluz =

Uluz Улуз
- Selo
- Location within Republic of Dagestan Location within Russia
- Coordinates: 41°57′N 47°50′E
- Country: Russia
- Region: Republic of Dagestan
- District: Tabasaransky District
- Time zone: UTC+3:00

Uluz (Russian: Улуз) is a rural locality (a selo) and the administrative center of Kuzhniksky Selsoviet, Tabasaransky District, Republic of Dagestan, Russia. Population: 500 (2010 census); 358 (2002 census); 296 (1989 Soviet census). There are 3 streets.

== Geography ==
Uluz is located 15 km west of Khuchni (the district's administrative centre) by road. Kuzhnik is the nearest rural locality.

Coordinates: 41°57′N 47°50′E / 41.950°N 47.833°E / 41.950; 47.833

Country	Russia
Region	Republic of Dagestan
District	Tabasaransky District
Time zone	UTC+3:00
