= Chulat =

Chulat Чулат ЧвулатI
- Selo
- Location within Republic of Dagestan Location within Russia
- Coordinates: 41°52′N 48°09′E
- Country: Russia
- Region: Republic of Dagestan
- District: Tabasaransky District
- Time zone: UTC+3:00

Chulat (Russian: Чулат; Tabassaran: ЧвулатI) is a rural locality (a selo) in Tabasaransky District, Republic of Dagestan, Russia. Population: 1,114 (2010 census); 1,050 (2002 census); 794 (1989 Soviet census). There are 18 streets.

== Geography ==
Chulat is located 32 km southeast of Khuchni (the district's administrative centre) by road. Gyukhryag is the nearest rural locality.
