= Rubas =

Rubas Рубас
- Village
- Location within Republic of Dagestan Location within Russia
- Coordinates: 41°53′N 48°19′E
- Country: Russia
- Region: Republic of Dagestan
- District: Derbentsky District
- Time zone: UTC+3:00

Rubas (Russian: Рубас) is a rural locality (a selo) and the administrative centre of Rubassky Selsoviet, Derbentsky District, Republic of Dagestan, Russia. The population was 3,099 as of 2010. There are 44 streets.

== Geography ==
The settlement is located in the coastal lowland, on the left bank of the Rubas River. Rubas is located 19 km south of Derbent (the district's administrative centre) by road. Aglobi and Kommuna are the nearest rural localities.

== History ==
Former Mountain Jewish village. At the beginning of the 20th century, it was inhabited by settlers from the Poltava province.

In 1966, after an earthquake, residents of the village of Chulak, Khivsky region, were resettled to the village of Rubas. In 1972, the village of Khoshmenzil was included in the village.

== Nationalities ==
Tabasarans, Azerbaijanis, Lezgins and Aghuls live there.
