= Muzaim =

Muzaim Музаим Мүзајим
- Selo
- Location within Republic of Dagestan Location within Russia
- Coordinates: 41°54′N 48°17′E
- Country: Russia
- Region: Republic of Dagestan
- District: Derbentsky District
- Time zone: UTC+3:00

Muzaim (Russian: Музаим; Azerbaijani: Мүзајим, Müzayim) is a rural locality (a selo) in Derbentsky District, Republic of Dagestan, Russia. The population was 1,946 as of 2010. There are 17 streets.

== Geography ==
Muzaim is located 21 km south of Derbent (the district's administrative centre) by road. Rubas and Dyuzler are the nearest rural localities.

== Nationalities ==
Lezgins live there.
