= Tabasaran language =

Lezgic language of southern Dagestan, Russia

Tabasaran
- Tabassaran
- табасаран чӀал tabasaran ç̇al ихь чӀал ix ç̇al
- Pronunciation: [tɑbɑsɑrɑn t͡ʃʼɑl] [ix t͡ʃʼɑl]
- Native to: North Caucasus
- Region: Southern Dagestan
- Ethnicity: Tabasarans
- Native speakers: 75,079 (2020 census)
- Language family: Northeast Caucasian: Lezgic; Samur; Eastern Samur; Lezgi–Aghul–Tabasaran; Tabasaran

Official status
- Official language in: Russia: Dagestan

Language codes
- ISO 639-3: tab
- Glottolog: taba1259
- ELP: Tabasaran
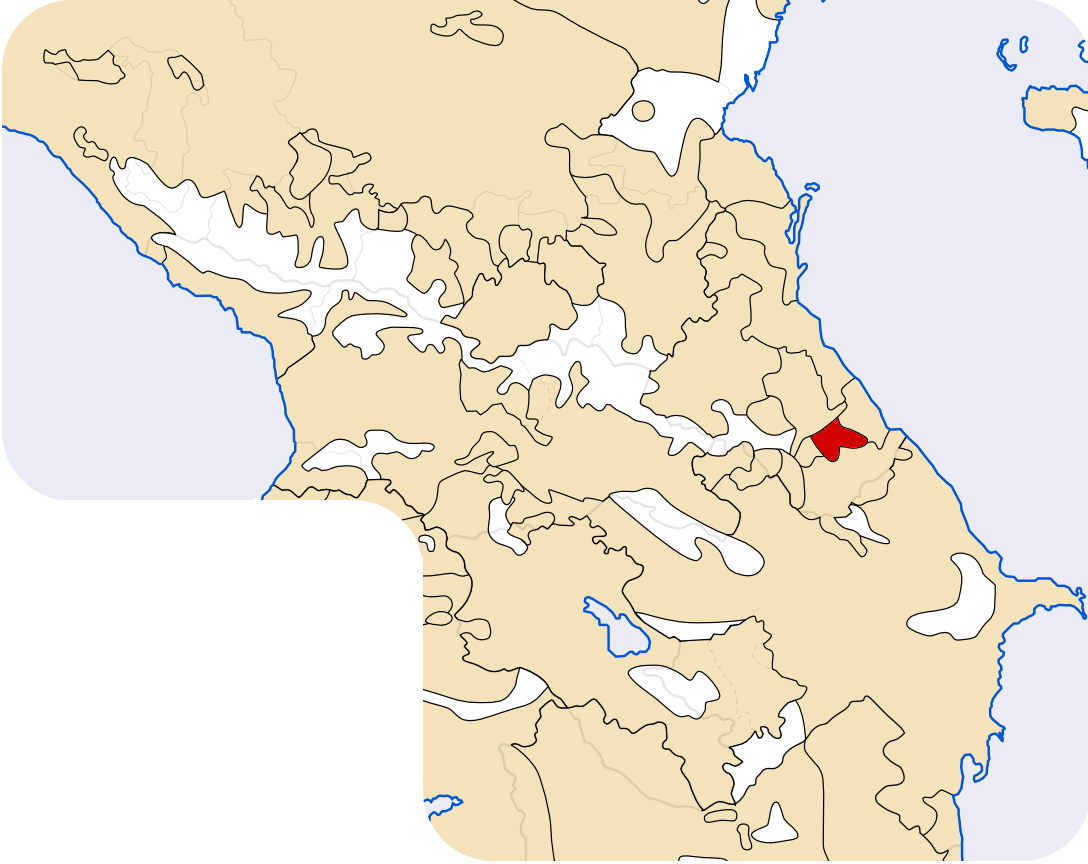
- Map of Tabasarans in the Caucasus

- Tabasaran is classified as Vulnerable by the UNESCO Atlas of the World's Languages in Danger.

Tabasaran (also written Tabassaran) is a Northeast Caucasian language of the Lezgic branch. It is spoken by the Tabasaran people in the southern part of the Russian Republic of Dagestan. There are two main dialects: North (Khanag) and South Tabasaran. It has a literary language based on the Southern dialect, one of the official languages of Dagestan.

Tabasaran is an ergative language. The verb system is relatively simple; verbs agree with the subject in number, person and (in North Tabasaran) class. North Tabasaran has two noun classes (that is, grammatical gender), whereas Southern Tabasaran lacks noun classes / gender.

== Geographical distribution ==
It is spoken in the basin of Upper Rubas-nir and Upper Chirakh-nir.

== Phonology ==
=== Consonants ===
Consonant phonemes of Tabasaran
		Labial	Dental		Post-alveolar		Velar	Uvular	Epiglottal	Glottal
		Labial	plain	sibilant	plain	labial	Velar	Uvular	Epiglottal	Glottal
Nasal		m	n							
Plosive/ Affricate	voiced	b	d	d͡z	d͡ʒ	d͡ʒʷ	ɡ	ɢ		
Plosive/ Affricate	voiceless	p	t	t͡s	t͡ʃ	t͡ʃʷ	k	q		ʔ
Plosive/ Affricate	fortis	pː	tː	t͡sː	t͡ʃː	t͡ʃʷː	kː	qː		
Plosive/ Affricate	ejective	pʼ	tʼ	t͡sʼ	t͡ʃʼ	t͡ʃʷʼ	kʼ	qʼ		
Fricative	voiceless	f		s	ʃ	ʃʷ	x		ʜ	
Fricative	fortis	fː		sː	ʃː	ʃʷː	xː			
Fricative	voiced	v		z	ʒ	ʒʷ	ɣ		ʢ	ɦ
Approximant			l		j					
Trill			r							

The post-alveolar sibilants may be whistled.

=== Vowels ===
	Front		Back
	unrounded	rounded	Back
Close	i	y	u
Mid	ɛ		
Open	æ		ɑ

Vowels of Tabasaran are /i, y, ɛ, æ, ɑ, u/.

== Writing system ==
=== Cyrillic (19th century) ===
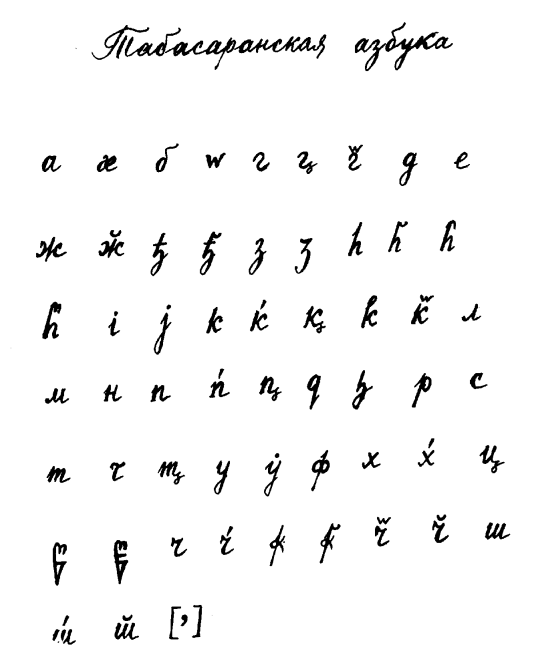
Peter von Uslar's Tabasaran alphabet

Peter von Uslar devised Cyrillic-based orthographies for many Caucasian languages, including Tabasaran.

=== Latin (1931–1938) ===
From 1931 to 1938, the Latin alphabet was used as a base for the Tabasaran writing system. The first book was published in 1932.

Initially, the alphabet took the following form:

a, b, c, cc, cь, ç, çь, d, e, ə, f, g, ƣ, h, i, j, k, kk, ⱪ, l, m, n, u, p, pp, ᶈ, q, ꝗ, r, s, ꟍ, ꟍꟍ, ş, şь, t, tt, t̨, y, v, x, ҳ, ӿ, z, ⱬ, zz, ƶ, ƶƶ, ƶь, '

Soon after, capital letters and the letters O o and were introduced. The alphabet then took the following form:

A a	B b	C c	Cь cь	Ç ç	Çь çь	D d	E e	Ə ə	F f	G g
Ƣ ƣ	H h	I i	J j	K k	Ⱪ ⱪ	L l	M m	N n	O o	P p
ᶈ	Q q	Ꝗ ꝗ	R r	S s	Ꟍ ꟍ	Ş ş	Şь şь	T t		U u
V v	X x	Ҳ ҳ	Ӿ ӿ	Y y	Z z	Ⱬ ⱬ	Ƶ ƶ		Ƶь ƶь	'

=== Cyrillic (1938–present) ===
Tabasaran has been written using Cyrillic since 1938.

Letter	IPA	Letter	IPA
А а	/ɑ/	Р р	/r/
Аь аь	/æ/	С с	/s/
Б б	/b/	Т т	/tʰ/
В в	/v/	Тт тт	/tː/
Г г	/ɡ/, /ɢ/	ТӀ тӀ	/tʼ/
Гг гг	/ɣ/	У у	/u/
Гъ гъ	/ʕ/	Уь уь	/y/
Гь гь	/h/	Ф ф	/f/
Д д	/d/	Х х	/ɦ/
Е е	/ɛ/, /jɛ/	Хъ хъ	/qʰ/
Ё ё	/jo/	Хь хь	/x/
Ж ж	/ʒ/, /dʒ/	Ц ц	/tsʰ/
Жв жв	/ʒʷ/	Цц цц	/tsːʰ/
З з	/z/, /dz/	ЦӀ цӀ	/tsʼ/
И и	/i/	Ч ч	/tʃʰ/
Й й	/j/	Чв чв	/tʃʷʰ/
К к	/kʰ/	Чч чч	/tʃːʰ/
Кк кк	/kː/	ЧӀ чӀ	/tʃʼ/
Къ къ	/qːʰ/	Ш ш	/ʃ/
Кь кь	/qʼ/	Шв шв	/ʃʷ/
КӀ кӀ	/kʼ/	Щ щ	/ɕ/
Л л	/l/	Ъ ъ	/ʔ/
М м	/m/	Ы ы	/ɨ/
Н н	/n/	Ь ь	
О о	/o/	Э э	/ɛ/
П п	/pʰ/	Ю ю	/y/, /ju/
ПП пп	/pː/	Я я	/æ/, /jɑ/
ПӀ пӀ	/pʼ/		

Note: /ё/ and /o/ are encountered only in loanwords from Russian.

== Grammar ==
Tabasaran is an agglutinating and primarily suffixing language with ergative-absolutive alignment. It is highly probable that Tabasaran is an active language of the fluid-S type.

=== Nouns ===
Tabasaran nouns inflect for number and case, and they control gender agreement. Tabasaran is unusual for northeast Caucasian languages in that it does not differentiate between masculine and feminine nouns. It does distinguish between human and non-human nouns, but only in the singular.

dumu tup-si di-rğ-uru
3SG.ABS ball-SIMIL HSG-roll-EVT
"He rolls like a ball"

räq žiqi-b vu
way short-NHSG COP
"The way is short"

bali-z zimz-ar ğä-r-q-ü
boy.OBL-DAT ant-PL.ABS PX.AOR-PL-see-AOR
"The boy saw some ants"

==== Cases ====
Tabasaran has 4 grammatical, or core, cases (absolutive, ergative, genitive, and dative), but the number of locative cases is debated. Tabasaran was listed in the 1997 Guinness Book of World Records as having the largest case system in the world, with 48. Hjelmslev (1935) claimed that Tabasaran had the 'empirical maximum' number of cases, with 52 (though 2 occur only on adjectives). However, such claims are contested, and other languages such as Tsez would have even larger counts under such definitions. Comrie & Polinsky (1998) analyze the system as having 14 or 15 cases depending on the dialect. Babaliyeva (2023) identifies 46 cases, and Magometov (1965) identifies 47 in the southern dialect and 53 in the northern dialect.

The grammatical cases are formed as follows:

- The absolutive case is unmarked. E.g., xudul, "grandchild"
- There are multiple suffixes that can form the ergative: -i, -yi, -di, -ri, -li-, -ni, -u (-ü), -nu, -ru, -lu. -i and -di are the most productive forms. Tabasaran has an oblique stem, which is identical to the ergative case. E.g., tur-i, "sword"
- The genitive is formed by the suffix -n attached to the oblique stem. E.g., šüš-di-n gažin, "glass jug"
- The dative is formed by the suffix -z attached to the oblique stem. E.g., ğula-z, "village"

Example sentence using the absolutive, genitive, and dative cases:

nežber ča-n ğula-z qhadak-nu ğ-üru
worker.ABS self.OBL-GEN village-DAT return-SEQ come-EVT
"The worker returned to his village"

The analysis of cases from Babaliyeva (2023) identifies 7 locative cases: in 'in'; ad 'near to'; cont 'in vertical contact' or 'inside a mass'; post 'behind'; sub 'under'; inter 'between' or 'among'; and super 'on'. The locative cases can be suffixed to the noun alone, or the elative, lative, and comitative cases are suffixed onto the locative forms of the noun, creating 28 cases:

Case Paradigm (Babaliyeva 2023)
	Essive	Elative	Lative	Comitative
In-	-ʔ	-ʔ-an	-ʔ-na	-ʔ-di
Ad-	-h / -xh	-h-an / -xh-an	-h-na / -xh-na	-h-di / -xh-di
Cont-	-k	-k-an	-k-na	-k-di
Post-	-qh	-qh-an	-qh-na	-qh-di
Sub-	-kk	-kk-an	-kk-na	-kk-di
Inter-	-ğ	-ğ-än	-ğ-na	-ğ-di
Super-	-l	-l-an	-(ʔ)in-a	-(ʔ)in-di

The additional 14 cases are formed by adding the directive suffix -di to the elative and lative series (with some changes in the lative series).

Case Paradigm (Babaliyeva 2023)
Elative Series		Lative Series	
Inel-Dir	-ʔ-an-di	Inlat-Dir	-ʔ-na-di
Adel-Dir	-h-an-di / -xh-an-di	Adlat-Dir	-h-in-di / -xh-in-na
Contel-Dir	-k-an-di	Contlat-Dir	-k-in-di
Postel-Dir	-qh-an-di	Postlat-Dir	-qh-in-di
Subel-Dir	-kk-an-di	Sublat-Dir	-kk-in-di
Inter-Dir	-ğ-än-di	Interlat-	-ğ-in-di
Super-Dir	-l-an-di	Superlat-Dir	-(ʔ)in-a-di

By contrast, the analysis from Comrie and Polinksy (1998) count each suffix as a case, rather than considering each combination of suffixes as a case. In addition to the 4 grammatical cases (identical to the ones described in Babaliyeva's analysis), there are 8 local cases in the northern dialect, and 7 in the southern dialect. These morphemes describe spatial orientation, or the reference point.

Local Cases (Comrie & Polinsky 1998)
Orientation	Suffix
'in' (hollow space)	-ʔ
'on' (horizontal)	-ʔin
'behind'	-q
'under'	-kk
'at' (Note: 'at' and 'near, in front of' are not distinguished in the southern dialect)	-x^{y}
'near, in front of'	-h
'among'	-ɣ^{y}
'on' (vertical)	-k

The local cases alone have an essive meaning, or a lack of motion. In order to express motion away or motion from an object, the allative suffix -na or ablative suffix -an (respectively) is added. The local cases and the dative can also take the translative suffix -di to mark the location as less specific.

==== Pronouns ====
First- and second-person pronouns distinguish between inclusive and exclusive first person plural, and have irregular declensions, with the absolutive and ergative forms being identical.

1st and 2nd Person Pronouns
	I	You (sg)	We (excl)	We (incl)	You (pl)
Abs/Erg	uzu	uvu	uču	uxhu	učvu
Gen	yiz	yav	ič	ixh	ičv
Dat	uzu-z	uvu-z	uču-z	uxhu-z	učvu-z

The third-person pronouns are dumu (singular) and durar (plural).

Demonstrative pronouns show a proximal and distal distinction, as well as a distinction in elevation (higher or lower than the speaker). The emphatic particle ha- can be prefixed to each demonstrative.

	Singular	Plural
Proximal	mu	murar
Distal	t(u)mu	-
Anaphoric	dumu	durar
Higher	ğumu	-
Lower	kkumu	-

There are three reflexive (anaphoric) pronouns:

	1-2 Sg	3 Sg	3 Pl
Abs	žvuv	učv	čib
Erg	žvuv-u	ča-v	čp-i
Gen	žvuv-a-n	ča-n	čp-i-n
Date	žvuv-a-z	ča-z	čp-i-v

=== Adjectives ===
When adjectives are used in an attributive role, adjectives do not decline. E.g., äxü äšq’ 'great love', and äxü älamat-ar 'great splendour-PL'. Substantive adjectives require a gender and number suffix, and then decline as if they were nouns. Predicative adjectives can be uninflected, inflected for gender/number, or followed by the adverbial suffix -di.

Substantivization of äxü 'big'
	Human Sg	Non-human Sg	Plural
Absolutive	äxü-r	äxü-b	äxü-dar
Ergative	äxü-r-i	äxü-b-di	äxü-dar-i
Genitive	äxü-r-i-n	äxü-b-di-n	äxü-dar-i-n

== Samples ==
Uwu aldakurawu. "Уву алдакураву." — "You are falling."

Uzuz uwu kkunduzuz. "Узуз уву ккундузуз." — "I love you."

Uwu fudžuwa? "Уву фужува?" — "Who are you?"

Fici wuna? "Фици вуна?" — "How are you?"

Zakur ʕürza. "Закур гъюрза." — "I'll come tomorrow."

Uzu kana qheza. "Узу кана хъэза." — "I'll be back."
