= Tabasaransky District =

Tabasaransky District Табасаранский район (Russian)
- District

Other transcription(s)
  - Tabassaran: Табасаран район
  - Azerbaijani: Табасаран раjонy
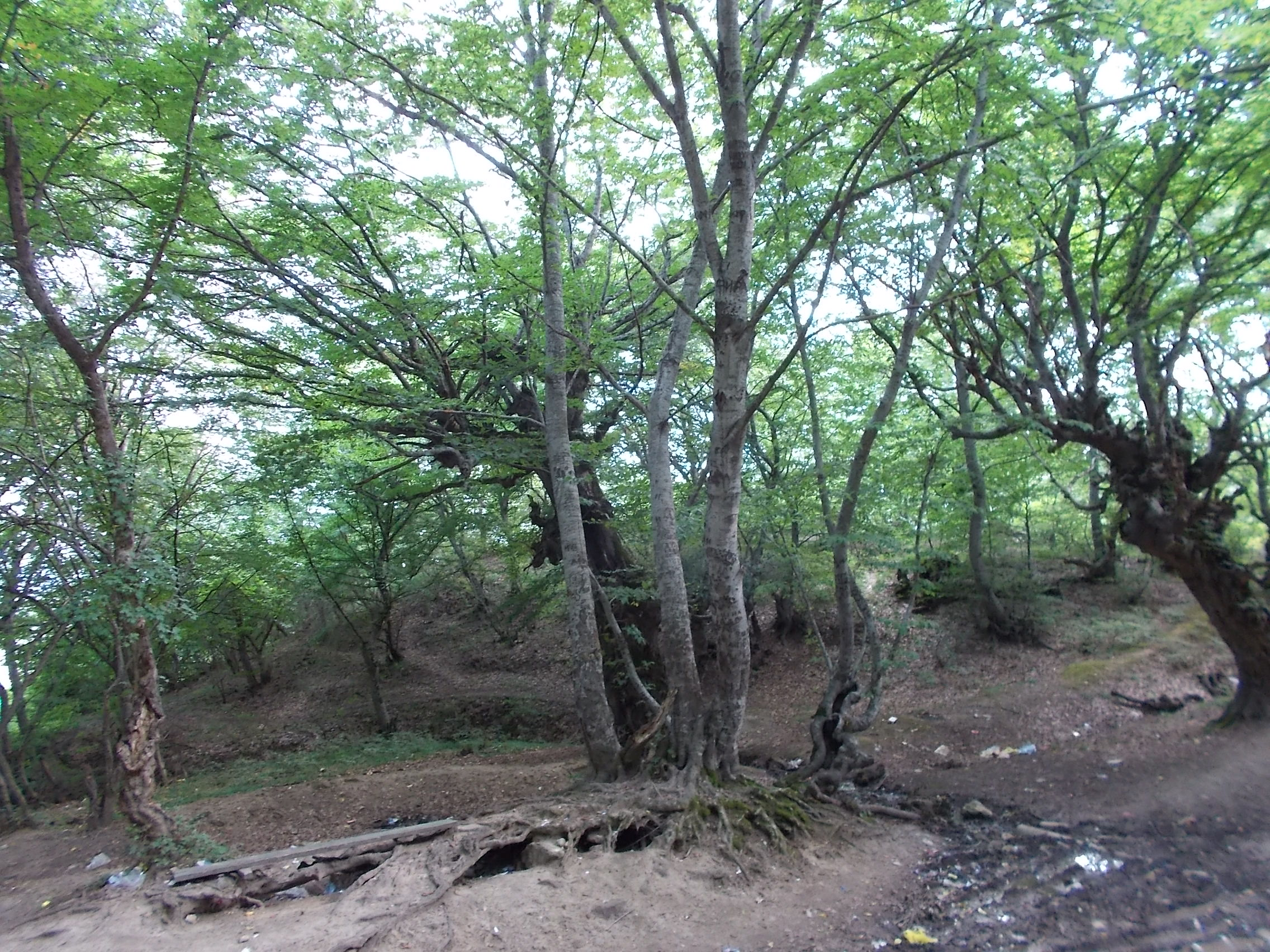
- A sacred spring, a cultural heritage object near the selo of Darvag in Tabasaransky District

- Coat of arms
- Location of Tabasaransky District in the Republic of Dagestan
- Coordinates: 41°57′N 47°57′E
- Country: Russia
- Federal subject: Republic of Dagestan
- Established: 1929
- Administrative center: Khuchni

Area
  - Total: 801 km^{2} (309 sq mi)

Population (2010 Census)
  - Total: 52,886
  - Density: 66.0/km^{2} (171/sq mi)
  - Urban: 0%
  - Rural: 100%

Administrative structure
  - Administrative divisions: 18 Selsoviets
  - Inhabited localities: 74 rural localities

Municipal structure
  - Municipally incorporated as: Tabasaransky Municipal District
  - Municipal divisions: 0 urban settlements, 22 rural settlements
- Time zone: UTC+3 (MSK)
- OKTMO ID: 82648000
- Website: http://mrtabasaran.ru

Population of Tabasaransky District
- 2010 Census: 52,886
- 2002 Census: 54,732
- 1989 Census: 42,081
- 1979 Census: 42,574

Tabasaransky District (Russian: Табасаранский райо́н) is an administrative and municipal district (raion), one of the forty-one in the Republic of Dagestan, Russia. It is located in the southeast of the republic. The area of the district is 801 square kilometers (309 sq mi). Its administrative center is the rural locality (a selo) of Khuchni. As of the 2010 Census, the total population of the district was 52,886, with the population of Khuchni accounting for 6.1% of that number.

== Administrative and municipal status ==
Within the framework of administrative divisions, Tabasaransky District is one of the forty-one in the Republic of Dagestan. The district is divided into eighteen selsoviets which comprise seventy-four rural localities. As a municipal division, the district is incorporated as Tabasaransky Municipal District. Its eighteen selsoviets are incorporated as twenty-two rural settlements within the municipal district. The selo of Khuchni serves as the administrative center of both the administrative and municipal district.

== Archaeology ==
The Paleolithic site of Tinit-1 is located 0.5 km northeast of the village of Tinit. Its lower archaeological horizons are more than 43,700 years old.

The Paleolithic site of Rubas-1 is located along the Rubas River, 3 km upstream from the village of Chulat. An ash horizon at the site has been dated to 1.5 ± 0.04 million years ago.
