= Khuchni =

Rural locality in Dagestan, Russia

Coordinates: 41°57′36″N 47°57′19″E

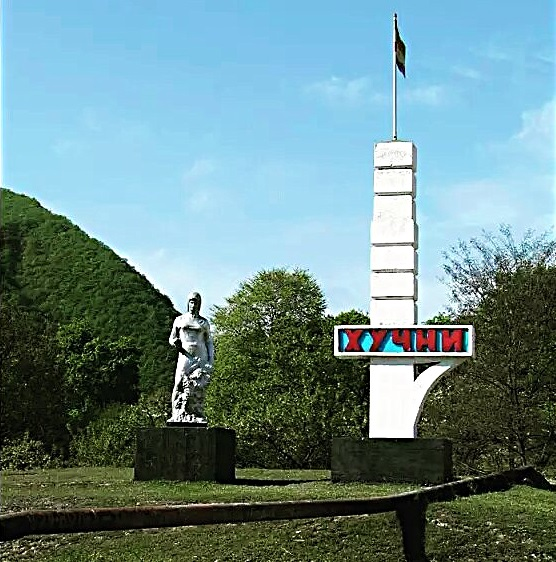
Entrance to Khuchni

Khuchni (Russian: Хучни, Tabassaran: Хючна) is a rural locality (a selo) and the administrative center of Tabasaransky District of the Republic of Dagestan, Russia. Population: 3,232 (2010 census); 3,397 (2002 census); 3,991 (1989 Soviet census).
