= Tsumilukh =

Tsumilukh Цумилух
- Selo
- Location within Republic of Dagestan Location within Russia
- Coordinates: 42°03′N 46°24′E
- Country: Russia
- Region: Republic of Dagestan
- District: Tlyaratinsky District
- Time zone: UTC+3:00

Tsumilukh (Russian: Цумилух) is a rural locality (a selo) and the administrative center of Saniortinsky Selsoviet, Tlyaratinsky District, Republic of Dagestan, Russia. Population: 993 (2010 census); 1,062 (2002 census); 688 (1989 Soviet census).

== Geography ==
Tsumilukh is located 19 km southeast of Tlyarata (the district's administrative centre) by road. Rosnob is the nearest rural locality.
