= Khintida =

Khintida Хинтида
- Selo
- Location within Republic of Dagestan Location within Russia
- Coordinates: 42°13′N 46°16′E
- Country: Russia
- Region: Republic of Dagestan
- District: Tlyaratinsky District
- Time zone: UTC+3:00

Khintida (Russian: Хинтида) is a rural locality (a selo) in Shidibsky Selsoviet, Tlyaratinsky District, Republic of Dagestan, Russia. Population: 58 (2010 census); 68 (2002 census); 55 (1989 Soviet census).

== Geography ==
Khintida is located 20 km northwest of Tlyarata (the district's administrative centre) by road. Landa is the nearest rural locality.
