= Sikar, Republic of Dagestan =

Sikar Сикар СикӀар
- Selo
- Location within Republic of Dagestan Location within Russia
- Coordinates: 42°04′N 46°24′E
- Country: Russia
- Region: Republic of Dagestan
- District: Tlyaratinsky District
- Time zone: UTC+3:00

Sikar (Russian: Сикар; Avar: СикӀар) is a rural locality (a selo) in Khadiyalsky Selsoviet, Tlyaratinsky District, Republic of Dagestan, Russia. Population: 158 (2010 census); 151 (2002 census); 147 (1989 Soviet census). There are 2 streets.

== Geography ==
Sikar is located 13 km southeast of Tlyarata (the district's administrative centre) by road. Nikar is the nearest rural locality.
