= Tinchuda =

Tinchuda Тинчуда ТӀинчуда
- Selo
- Location within Republic of Dagestan Location within Russia
- Coordinates: 42°11′N 46°27′E
- Country: Russia
- Region: Republic of Dagestan
- District: Tlyaratinsky District
- Time zone: UTC+3:00

Tinchuda (Russian: Тинчуда; Avar: ТӀинчуда) is a rural locality (a selo) in Nachadinsky Selsoviet, Tlyaratinsky District, Republic of Dagestan, Russia. Population: 211 (2010 census); 93 (2002 census); 86 (1989 Soviet census).

== Geography ==
Tinchuda is located 31 km northeast of Tlyarata (the district's administrative centre) by road. Nachada is the nearest rural locality.
