= Chododa =

Chododa Чодода ЧӀодода
- Selo
- Location within Republic of Dagestan Location within Russia
- Coordinates: 42°11′N 46°18′E
- Country: Russia
- Region: Republic of Dagestan
- District: Tlyaratinsky District
- Time zone: UTC+3:00

Chododa (Russian: Чодода; Avar: ЧӀодода) is a rural locality (a selo) in Chadakolobsky Selsoviet, Tlyaratinsky District, Republic of Dagestan, Russia. Population: 137 (2010 census); 167 (2002 census); 170 (1989 Soviet census).

== Geography ==
Chododa is located 20 km north of Tlyarata (the district's administrative centre) by road. Chadakolob is the nearest rural locality.
