= Childa =

Childa Чилда ЧӀилда
- Selo
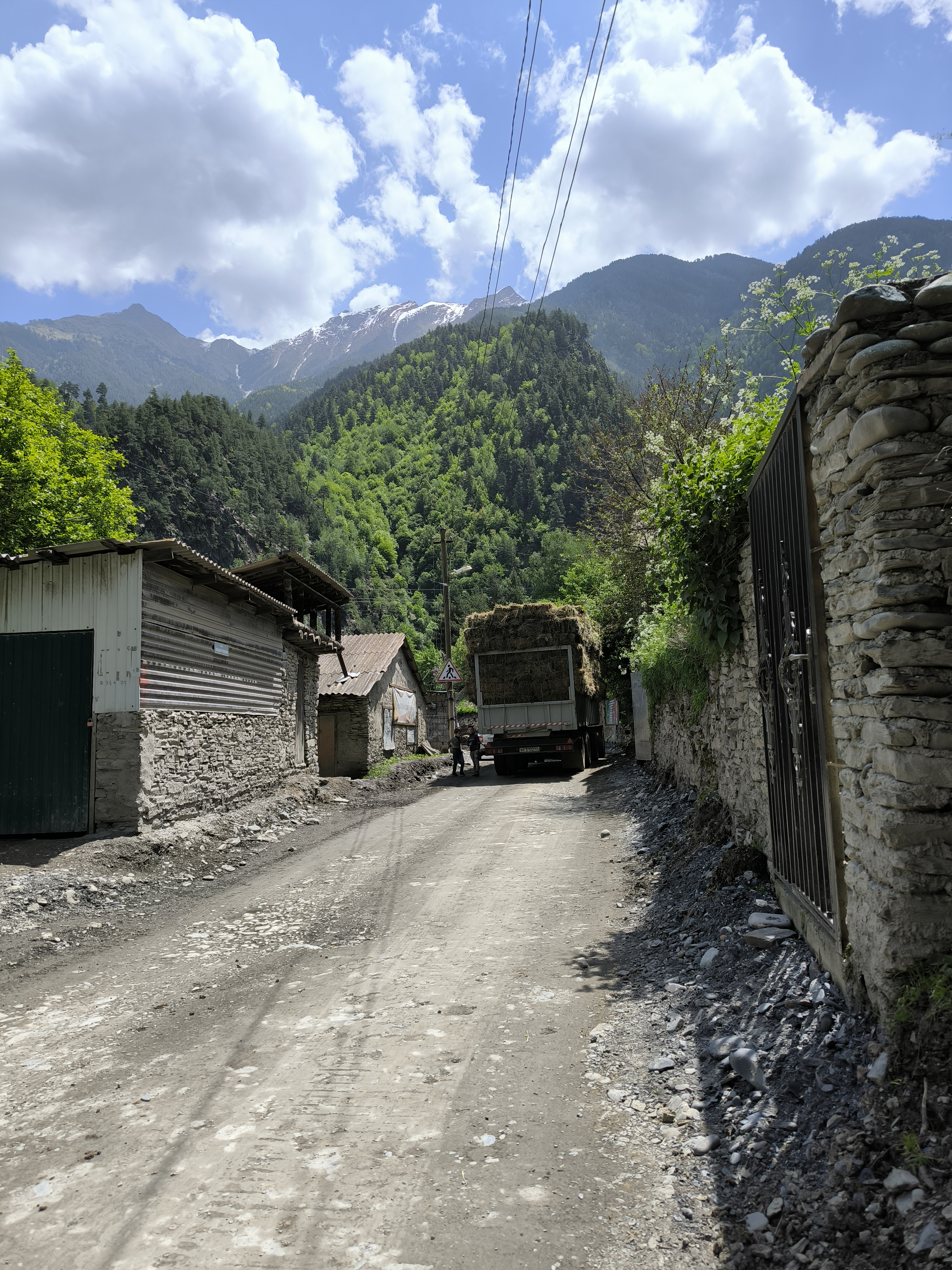

- Location within Republic of Dagestan Location within Russia
- Coordinates: 42°09′N 46°20′E
- Country: Russia
- Region: Republic of Dagestan
- District: Tlyaratinsky District
- Time zone: UTC+3:00

Childa (Russian: Чилда; Avar: ЧӀилда) is a rural locality (a selo) in Khidibsky Selsoviet, Tlyaratinsky District, Republic of Dagestan, Russia. Population: 115 (2010 census); 148 (2002 census); 132 (1989 Soviet census).

== Geography ==
Childa is located 9 km north of Tlyarata (the district's administrative centre) by road. Anada is the nearest rural locality.
