= Talsukh =

Talsukh Талсух ТӀалцухъ
- Selo
- Location within Republic of Dagestan Location within Russia
- Coordinates: 42°02′N 46°24′E
- Country: Russia
- Region: Republic of Dagestan
- District: Tlyaratinsky District
- Time zone: UTC+3:00

Talsukh (Russian: Талсух; Avar: ТӀалцухъ) is a rural locality (a selo) in Saniortinsky Selsoviet, Tlyaratinsky District, Republic of Dagestan, Russia. Population: 394 (2010 census); 300 (2002 census); 226 (1989 Soviet census).

== Geography ==
Talsukh is located 13 km southeast of Tlyarata (the district's administrative centre) by road. Rosnob is the nearest rural locality.
