= Kamilukh =

Kamilukh Камилух Къамилухъ
- Selo
- Location within Republic of Dagestan Location within Russia
- Coordinates: 41°54′N 46°37′E
- Country: Russia
- Region: Republic of Dagestan
- District: Tlyaratinsky District
- Time zone: UTC+3:00

Kamilukh (Russian: Камилух; Avar: Къамилухъ) is a rural locality (a selo) and the administrative center of Kamilukhsky Selsoviet, Tlyaratinsky District, Republic of Dagestan, Russia. Population: 903 (2010 census); 867 (2002 census); 775 (1989 Soviet census). There are 2 streets.

== Geography ==
Kamilukh is located 44 km southeast of Tlyarata (the district's administrative centre) by road. Genekolob is the nearest rural locality.
