= Khorta =

Khorta Хорта
- Selo
- Location within Republic of Dagestan Location within Russia
- Coordinates: 42°11′N 46°21′E
- Country: Russia
- Region: Republic of Dagestan
- District: Tlyaratinsky District
- Time zone: UTC+3:00

Khorta (Russian: Хорта) is a rural locality (a selo) in Khidibsky Selsoviet, Tlyaratinsky District, Republic of Dagestan, Russia. Population: 65 (2010 census); 39 (2002 census); 26 (1989 Soviet census).

== Geography ==
Khorta is located 25 km north of Tlyarata (the district's administrative centre) by road. Maalib is the nearest rural locality.
