= Tokhota =

Tokhota Тохота ТӀохьотӀа
- Selo
- Location within Republic of Dagestan Location within Russia
- Coordinates: 42°01′N 46°27′E
- Country: Russia
- Region: Republic of Dagestan
- District: Tlyaratinsky District
- Time zone: UTC+3:00

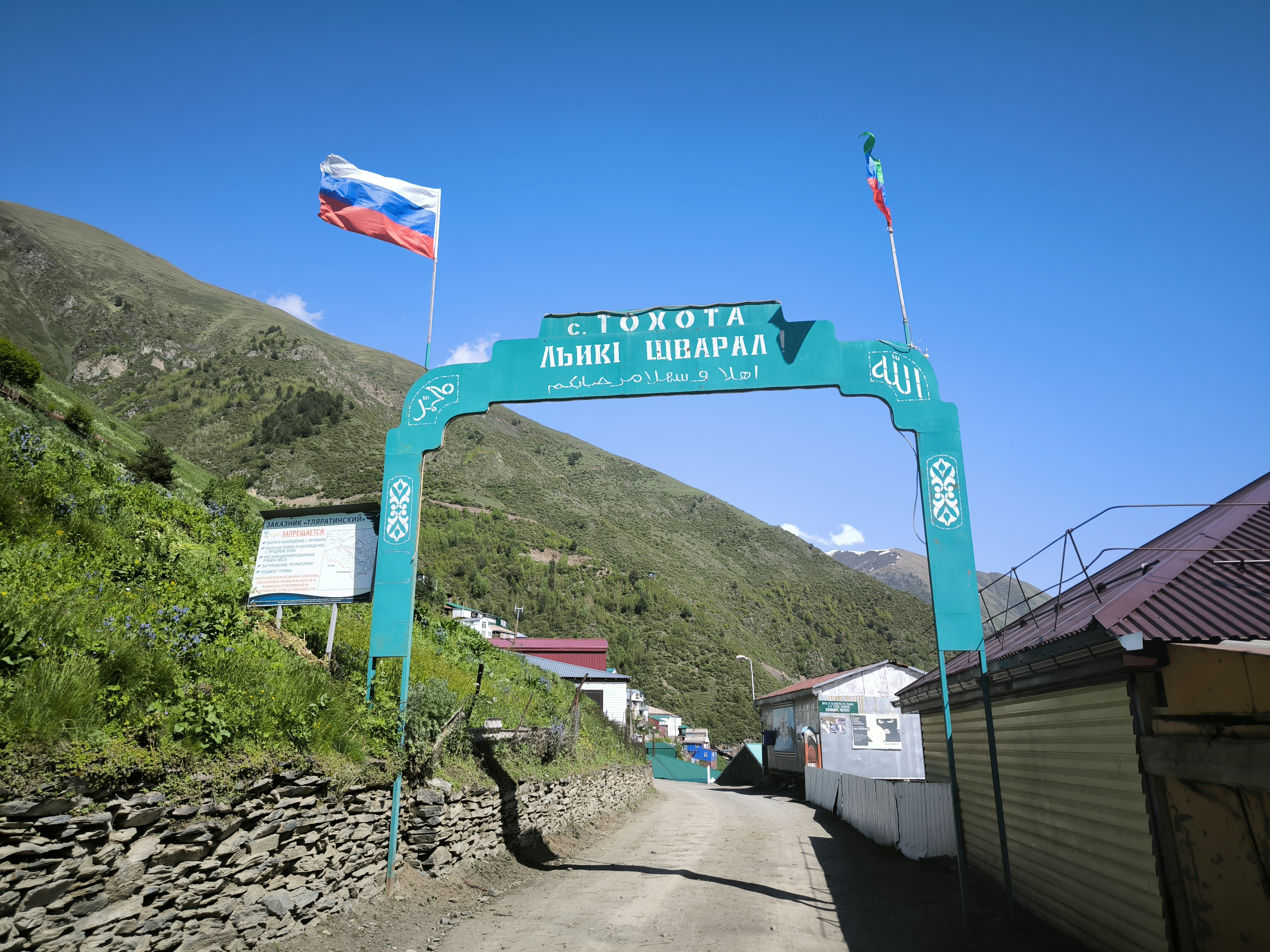
Welcome sign in Tohota

Tokhota (Russian: Тохота; Avar: ТӀохьотӀа) is a rural locality (a selo) and the administrative center of Tokhotinsky Selsoviet, Tlyaratinsky District, Republic of Dagestan, Russia. Population: 625 (2010 census); 477 (2002 census); 374 (1989 Soviet census).

== Geography ==
Tokhota is located 21 km southeast of Tlyarata (the district's administrative centre) by road. Saniorta is the nearest rural locality.
