= Ukal =

Ukal Укал Гьукъал
- Selo
- Location within Republic of Dagestan Location within Russia
- Coordinates: 42°07′N 46°20′E
- Country: Russia
- Region: Republic of Dagestan
- District: Tlyaratinsky District
- Time zone: UTC+3:00

Ukal (Russian: Укал; Avar: Гьукъал) is a rural locality (a selo) in Tlyaratinsky Selsoviet, Tlyaratinsky District, Republic of Dagestan, Russia. Population: 481 (2010 census); 426 (2002 census); 437 (1989 Soviet census).

== Geography ==
Ukal is located 3 km north of Tlyarata (the district's administrative centre) by road. Tilutl is the nearest rural locality.
