= Nikar, Republic of Dagestan =

Nikar Никар
- Selo
- Location within Republic of Dagestan Location within Russia
- Coordinates: 42°04′N 46°24′E
- Country: Russia
- Region: Republic of Dagestan
- District: Tlyaratinsky District
- Time zone: UTC+3:00

Nikar (Russian: Никар; Avar: НикӀар) is a rural locality (a selo) in Khadiyalsky Selsoviet, Tlyaratinsky District, Republic of Dagestan, Russia. Population: 237 (2010 census); 174 (2002 census); 232 (1989 Soviet census). There are 3 streets.

== Geography ==
Nikar is located 11 km southeast of Tlyarata (the district's administrative centre) by road. Sikar is the nearest rural locality.
