= Bochokh =

Bochokh Бочох Бочохъ
- Selo
- Location within Republic of Dagestan Location within Russia
- Coordinates: 42°13′N 46°17′E
- Country: Russia
- Region: Republic of Dagestan
- District: Tlyaratinsky District
- Time zone: UTC+3:00

Bochokh (Russian: Бочох; Avar: Бочохъ) is a rural locality (a selo) in Shidibsky Selsoviet, Tlyaratinsky District, Republic of Dagestan, Russia. Population: 81 (2010 census); 62 (2002 census); 39 (1989 Soviet census).

== Geography ==
Bochokh is located 23 km northwest of Tlyarata (the district's administrative centre) by road. Khantakolob is the nearest rural locality.
