= Gendukh =

Gendukh Гендух Гендухъ
- Selo
- Location within Republic of Dagestan Location within Russia
- Coordinates: 42°08′N 46°24′E
- Country: Russia
- Region: Republic of Dagestan
- District: Tlyaratinsky District
- Time zone: UTC+3:00

Gendukh (Russian: Гендух; Avar: Гендухъ) is a rural locality (a selo) in Gvedyshsky Selsoviet, Tlyaratinsky District, Republic of Dagestan, Russia. Population: 285 (2010 census); 177 (2002 census); 340 (1989 Soviet census).

== Geography ==
Gendukh is located 7 km northeast of Tlyarata (the district's administrative centre) by road. Gvedysh is the nearest rural locality.
