= Khadakolob =

Khadakolob Хадаколоб
- Selo
- Location within Republic of Dagestan Location within Russia
- Coordinates: 42°13′N 46°15′E
- Country: Russia
- Region: Republic of Dagestan
- District: Tlyaratinsky District
- Time zone: UTC+3:00

Khadakolob (Russian: Хадаколоб) is a rural locality (a selo) in Shidibsky Selsoviet, Tlyaratinsky District, Republic of Dagestan, Russia. Population: 264 (2010 census); 59 (2002 census); 126 (1989 Soviet census).

== Geography ==
Khadakolob is located 22 km northwest of Tlyarata (the district's administrative centre) by road. Nukhotkolob is the nearest rural locality.
