= Karadla =

Karadla Карадла
- Selo
- Location within Republic of Dagestan Location within Russia
- Coordinates: 42°12′N 46°17′E
- Country: Russia
- Region: Republic of Dagestan
- District: Tlyaratinsky District
- Time zone: UTC+3:00

Karadla (Russian: Карадла) is a rural locality (a selo) in Shidibsky Selsoviet, Tlyaratinsky District, Republic of Dagestan, Russia. Population: 34 (2010 census); 18 (2002 census); 27 (1989 Soviet census).

== Geography ==
Karadla is located 17 km northwest of Tlyarata (the district's administrative centre) by road. Shidib is the nearest rural locality.
