= Landa, Republic of Dagestan =

Landa Ланда
- Selo
- Location within Republic of Dagestan Location within Russia
- Coordinates: 42°13′N 46°16′E
- Country: Russia
- Region: Republic of Dagestan
- District: Tlyaratinsky District
- Time zone: UTC+3:00

Landa (Russian: Ланда) is a rural locality (a selo) and the administrative center of Shidibsky Selsoviet, Tlyaratinsky District, Republic of Dagestan, Russia. Population: 557 (2010 census); 237 (2002 census); 618 (1989 Soviet census). There are 4 streets.

== Geography ==
Landa is located 20 km northwest of Tlyarata (the district's administrative centre) by road. Khintida is the nearest rural locality.
