= Magitl =

Magitl Магитль МагъилӀ
- Selo
- Location within Republic of Dagestan Location within Russia
- Coordinates: 42°14′N 46°22′E
- Country: Russia
- Region: Republic of Dagestan
- District: Tlyaratinsky District
- Time zone: UTC+3:00

Magitl (Russian: Магитль; Avar: МагъилӀ) is a rural locality (a selo) in Kosobsky Selsoviet, Tlyaratinsky District, Republic of Dagestan, Russia. Population: 20 (2010 census); 44 (2002 census); 45 (1989 Soviet census).

== Geography ==
Magitl is located 26 km north of Tlyarata (the district's administrative centre) by road. Busutli is the nearest rural locality.
