= Ibragimotar =

Ibragimotar Ибрагимотар Бугьнада
- Selo
- Location within Republic of Dagestan Location within Russia
- Coordinates: 43°33′N 46°28′E
- Country: Russia
- Region: Republic of Dagestan
- District: Tlyaratinsky District
- Time zone: UTC+3:00

Ibragimotar (Russian: Ибрагимотар; Avar: Бугьнада) is a rural locality (a selo) and the administrative center of Gindibsky Selsoviet, Tlyaratinsky District, Republic of Dagestan, Russia. Population: 1,232 (2010 census); 1,923 (2002 census); 903 (1989 Soviet census). There are 14 streets.

== Geography ==
Ibragimotar is located 289 km north of Tlyarata (the district's administrative centre) by road. Kalininaul is the nearest rural locality.
