= Gvedysh =

Gvedysh Гведыш Гъведиш
- Selo
- Location within Republic of Dagestan Location within Russia
- Coordinates: 42°08′N 46°24′E
- Country: Russia
- Region: Republic of Dagestan
- District: Tlyaratinsky District
- Time zone: UTC+3:00

Gvedysh (Russian: Гведыш; Avar: Гъведиш) is a rural locality (a selo) and the administrative center of Gvedyshsky Selsoviet, Tlyaratinsky District, Republic of Dagestan, Russia. Population: 768 (2010 census); 853 (2002 census); 546 (1989 Soviet census).

== Geography ==
Gvedysh is located 8 km northeast of Tlyarata (the district's administrative centre) by road. Gendukh is the nearest rural locality.
