= Tamuda, Republic of Dagestan =

Tamuda Тамуда ТӀамуда
- Selo
- Location within Republic of Dagestan Location within Russia
- Coordinates: 42°12′N 46°22′E
- Country: Russia
- Region: Republic of Dagestan
- District: Tlyaratinsky District
- Time zone: UTC+3:00

Tamuda (Russian: Тамуда; Avar: ТӀамуда) is a rural locality (a selo) in Mazadinsky Selsoviet, Tlyaratinsky District, Republic of Dagestan, Russia. Population: 67 (2010 census); 60 (2002 census); 48 (1989 Soviet census).

== Geography ==
Tamuda is located 23 km north of Tlyarata (the district's administrative centre) by road. Khobokh is the nearest rural locality.
