= Saniorta =

Saniorta Саниорта СанигӀортӀа
- Selo
- Location within Republic of Dagestan Location within Russia
- Coordinates: 42°01′N 46°26′E
- Country: Russia
- Region: Republic of Dagestan
- District: Tlyaratinsky District
- Time zone: UTC+3:00

Saniorta (Russian: Саниорта; Avar: СанигӀортӀа) is a rural locality (a selo) in Tokhotinsky Selsoviet, Tlyaratinsky District, Republic of Dagestan, Russia. Population: 288 (2010 census); 253 (2002 census); 202 (1989 Soviet census).

== Geography ==
Saniorta is located 20 km southeast of Tlyarata (the district's administrative centre) by road. Tokhota is the nearest rural locality.
