= Tlyanada =

Tlyanada Тлянада Кьанада
- Selo
- Location within Republic of Dagestan Location within Russia
- Coordinates: 42°01′N 46°30′E
- Country: Russia
- Region: Republic of Dagestan
- District: Tlyaratinsky District
- Time zone: UTC+3:00

Tlyanada (Russian: Тлянада; Avar: Кьанада) is a rural locality (a selo) in Kolobsky Selsoviet, Tlyaratinsky District, Republic of Dagestan, Russia. Population: 485 (2010 census); 232 (2002 census); 320 (1989 Soviet census).

== Geography ==
Tlyanada is located 29 km southeast of Tlyarata (the district's administrative centre) by road. Kolob is the nearest rural locality.
