= Tsimguda =

Tsimguda Цимгуда
- Selo
- Location within Republic of Dagestan Location within Russia
- Coordinates: 42°00′N 46°33′E
- Country: Russia
- Region: Republic of Dagestan
- District: Tlyaratinsky District
- Time zone: UTC+3:00

Tsimguda (Russian: Цимгуда) is a rural locality (a selo) in Kolobsky Selsoviet, Tlyaratinsky District, Republic of Dagestan, Russia. Population: 147 (2010 census); 61 (2002 census); 103 (1989 Soviet census).

== Geography ==
Tsimguda is located 33 km southeast of Tlyarata (the district's administrative centre) by road. Gagar and Kolob are the nearest rural localities.
