= Nachada =

Nachada Начада НачӀада
- Selo
- Location within Republic of Dagestan Location within Russia
- Coordinates: 42°11′N 46°26′E
- Country: Russia
- Region: Republic of Dagestan
- District: Tlyaratinsky District
- Time zone: UTC+3:00

Nachada (Russian: Начада; Avar: НачӀада) is a rural locality (a selo) and the administrative center of Nachadinsky Selsoviet, Tlyaratinsky District, Republic of Dagestan, Russia. Population: 162 (2010 census); 119 (2002 census); 166 (1989 Soviet census). There are 2 streets.

== Geography ==
Nachada is located 31 km northeast of Tlyarata (the district's administrative centre) by road. Tinchuda is the nearest rural locality.
