= Niklida =

Niklida Никлида Нихьлида
- Selo
- Location within Republic of Dagestan Location within Russia
- Coordinates: 42°11′N 46°24′E
- Country: Russia
- Region: Republic of Dagestan
- District: Tlyaratinsky District
- Time zone: UTC+3:00

Niklida (Russian: Никлида; Avar: Нихьлида) is a rural locality (a selo) in Mazadinsky Selsoviet, Tlyaratinsky District, Republic of Dagestan, Russia. Population: 173 (2010 census); 122 (2002 census); 104 (1989 Soviet census).

== Geography ==
Niklida is located 30 km north of Tlyarata (the district's administrative centre) by road. Rosta is the nearest rural locality.
