= Kutlab =

Kutlab Кутлаб
- Selo
- Location within Republic of Dagestan Location within Russia
- Coordinates: 42°05′N 46°19′E
- Country: Russia
- Region: Republic of Dagestan
- District: Tlyaratinsky District
- Time zone: UTC+3:00

Kutlab (Russian: Кутлаб) is a rural locality (a selo) in Tlyaratinsky District, Republic of Dagestan, Russia. Population: 737 (2021 census); 823 (2002 census); 836 (1989 Soviet census).

== Geography ==
Kutlab is located 6 km southwest of Tlyarata (the district's administrative centre) by road. Tlyarata is the nearest rural locality.
