= Nadar, Republic of Dagestan =

Nadar Надар
- Selo
- Location within Republic of Dagestan Location within Russia
- Coordinates: 42°05′N 46°21′E
- Country: Russia
- Region: Republic of Dagestan
- District: Tlyaratinsky District
- Time zone: UTC+3:00

Nadar (Russian: Надар) is a rural locality (a selo) in Tlyaratinsky Selsoviet, Tlyaratinsky District, Republic of Dagestan, Russia. Population: 177 (2010 census); 163 (2002 census); 128 (1989 Soviet census).

== Geography ==
Nadar is located 1 km southeast of Tlyarata (the district's administrative centre) by road. Tlyarata is the nearest rural locality.
