= Khotlob =

Khotlob Хотлоб ХӀокьоб
- Selo
- Location within Republic of Dagestan Location within Russia
- Coordinates: 42°12′N 46°25′E
- Country: Russia
- Region: Republic of Dagestan
- District: Tlyaratinsky District
- Time zone: UTC+3:00

Khotlob (Russian: Хотлоб; Avar: ХӀокьоб) is a rural locality (a selo) in Nachadinsky Selsoviet, Tlyaratinsky District, Republic of Dagestan, Russia. Population: 151 (2010 census); 65 (2002 census); 112 (1989 Soviet census).

== Geography ==
Khotlob is located 29 km northeast of Tlyarata (the district's administrative centre) by road. Zhazhada is the nearest rural locality.
