= Gerel =

Geriel Герель Гъерел
- Selo
- Location within Republic of Dagestan Location within Russia
- Coordinates: 41°56′N 46°33′E
- Country: Russia
- Region: Republic of Dagestan
- District: Tlyaratinsky District
- Time zone: UTC+3:00

Gerel (Russian: Герель; Avar: Гъерел) is a rural locality (a selo) in Gerelsky Selsoviet, Tlyaratinsky District, Republic of Dagestan, Russia.

Population:

395 (2010 census);[2] 534 (2002 census);[3] 788 (1989 Soviet census).[4]

== Geography ==
Gerel is located 36 km southeast of Tlyarata (the district's administrative centre) by road. Betelda is the nearest rural locality.
