= Khobokh =

Khobokh Хобох Хьобохъ
- Selo
- Location within Republic of Dagestan Location within Russia
- Coordinates: 42°12′N 46°22′E
- Country: Russia
- Region: Republic of Dagestan
- District: Tlyaratinsky District
- Time zone: UTC+3:00

Khobokh (Russian: Хобох; Avar: Хьобохъ) is a rural locality (a selo) in Mazadinsky Selsoviet, Tlyaratinsky District, Republic of Dagestan, Russia. Population: 108 (2010 census); 96 (2002 census); 62 (1989 Soviet census).

== Geography ==
Khobokh is located 24 km north of Tlyarata (the district's administrative centre) by road. Tamuda is the nearest rural locality.
