= Choroda =

Choroda Чорода ЧӀорода
- Selo
- Location within Republic of Dagestan Location within Russia
- Coordinates: 41°58′N 46°29′E
- Country: Russia
- Region: Republic of Dagestan
- District: Tlyaratinsky District
- Time zone: UTC+3:00

Choroda (Russian: Чорода; Avar: ЧӀорода) is a rural locality (a selo) and the administrative center of Chorodinsky Selsoviet, Tlyaratinsky District, Republic of Dagestan, Russia. Population: 478 (2010 census); 622 (2002 census); 174 (1989 Soviet census). There are 2 streets.

== Geography ==
Choroda is located 29 km southeast of Tlyarata (the district's administrative centre) by road. Salda is the nearest rural locality.
