= Betelda =

Betelda Бетельда Белъелда
- Selo
- Location within Republic of Dagestan Location within Russia
- Coordinates: 41°57′N 46°32′E
- Country: Russia
- Region: Republic of Dagestan
- District: Tlyaratinsky District
- Time zone: UTC+3:00

Betelda (Russian: Бетельда; Avar: Белъелда) is a rural locality (a selo) and the administrative center of Gerelsky Selsoviet, Tlyaratinsky District, Republic of Dagestan, Russia. Population: 485 (2010 census); 557 (2002 census); 259 (1989 Soviet census).

== Geography ==
Betelda is located 36 km southeast of Tlyarata (the district's administrative centre) by road. Gerel is the nearest rural locality.
