= Salda, Republic of Dagestan =

Salda Салда
- Selo
- Location within Republic of Dagestan Location within Russia
- Coordinates: 41°58′N 46°30′E
- Country: Russia
- Region: Republic of Dagestan
- District: Tlyaratinsky District
- Time zone: UTC+3:00

Salda (Russian: Салда) is a rural locality (a selo) in Chorodinsky Selsoviet, Tlyaratinsky District, Republic of Dagestan, Russia. Population: 358 (2010 census); 115 (2002 census); 164 (1989 Soviet census).

== Geography ==
Salda is located 31 km southeast of Tlyarata (the district's administrative centre) by road. Choroda is the nearest rural locality.
