= Santa, Republic of Dagestan =

Santa Санта
- Selo
- Location within Republic of Dagestan Location within Russia
- Coordinates: 42°14′N 46°15′E
- Country: Russia
- Region: Republic of Dagestan
- District: Tlyaratinsky District
- Time zone: UTC+3:00

Santa (Russian: Санта) is a rural locality (a selo) in Shidibsky Selsoviet, Tlyaratinsky District, Republic of Dagestan, Russia. The population was 44 as of 2010.

== Geography ==
Santa is located 23 km northwest of Tlyarata (the district's administrative centre) by road. Nukhotkolob is the nearest rural locality.
