= Kardib =

Kardib Кардиб Къардиб
- Selo
- Location within Republic of Dagestan Location within Russia
- Coordinates: 42°06′N 46°30′E
- Country: Russia
- Region: Republic of Dagestan
- District: Tlyaratinsky District
- Time zone: UTC+3:00

Kardib (Russian: Кардиб; Avar: Къардиб) is a rural locality (a selo) and the administrative center of Kardibsky Selsoviet, Tlyaratinsky District, Republic of Dagestan, Russia. Population: 389 (2010 census); 430 (2002 census); 451 (1989 Soviet census). There are 2 streets.

== Geography ==
Kardib is located 21 km east of Tlyarata (the district's administrative centre) by road. Gindib is the nearest rural locality.
