= Noyrukh =

Rural locality in Dagestan, Russia. Population: 217

Noyrukh Нойрух НугӀрухъ
- Selo
- Location within Republic of Dagestan Location within Russia
- Coordinates: 42°11′N 46°22′E
- Country: Russia
- Region: Republic of Dagestan
- District: Tlyaratinsky District
- Time zone: UTC+3:00

Noyrukh (Russian: Нойрух; Avar: НугӀрухъ) is a rural locality (a selo) in Mazadinsky Selsoviet, Tlyaratinsky District, Republic of Dagestan, Russia. Population: 217 (2010 census); 135 (2002 census); 109 (1989 Soviet census).

== Geography ==
Noyrukh is located 21 km north of Tlyarata (the district's administrative centre) by road. Mazada ana Maalib are the nearest rural localities.
