= Tokh-Orda =

Tokh-Orda Тох-Орда
- Selo
- Location within Republic of Dagestan Location within Russia
- Coordinates: 42°06′N 46°21′E
- Country: Russia
- Region: Republic of Dagestan
- District: Tlyaratinsky District
- Time zone: UTC+3:00

Tokh-Orda

Tokh-Orda (Russian: Тох-Орда) is a rural locality (a selo) in Tlyaratinsky Selsoviet, Tlyaratinsky District, Republic of Dagestan, Russia. Population: 192 (2010 census); 224 (2002 census); 122 (1989 Soviet census).

== Geography ==
Tokh-Orda is located 2 km northeast of Tlyarata (the district's administrative centre) by road. Tlyarata and Tilutl are the nearest rural localities.
