= Rosnob =

Rosnob Росноб
- Selo
- Location within Republic of Dagestan Location within Russia
- Coordinates: 42°03′N 46°24′E
- Country: Russia
- Region: Republic of Dagestan
- District: Tlyaratinsky District
- Time zone: UTC+3:00

Rosnob (Russian: Росноб) is a rural locality (a selo) in Saniortinsky Selsoviet, Tlyaratinsky District, Republic of Dagestan, Russia. Population: 285 (2010 census); 212 (2002 census); 186 (1989 Soviet census).

== Geography ==
Rosnob is located 12 km southeast of Tlyarata (the district's administrative centre) by road. Tsumilukh is the nearest rural locality.
