= Khadiyal =

Khadiyal Хадиял
- Selo
- Location within Republic of Dagestan Location within Russia
- Coordinates: 42°06′N 46°27′E
- Country: Russia
- Region: Republic of Dagestan
- District: Tlyaratinsky District
- Time zone: UTC+3:00

Khadiyal (Russian: Хадиял) is a rural locality (a selo) and the administrative center of Khadiyalsky Selsoviet, Tlyaratinsky District, Republic of Dagestan, Russia. Population: 304 (2010 census); 284 (2002 census); 432 (1989 Soviet census). There are 2 streets.

== Geography ==
Khadiyal is located 16 km east of Tlyarata (the district's administrative centre) by road. Tadiyal is the nearest rural locality.
