= Chadakolob =

Chadakolob Чадаколоб ЧӀадаколоб
- Selo
- Location within Republic of Dagestan Location within Russia
- Coordinates: 42°11′N 46°19′E
- Country: Russia
- Region: Republic of Dagestan
- District: Tlyaratinsky District
- Time zone: UTC+3:00

Chadakolob (Russian: Чадаколоб; Avar: ЧӀадаколоб) is a rural locality (a selo) and the administrative center of Chadakolobsky Selsoviet, Tlyaratinsky District, Republic of Dagestan, Russia. Population: 228 (2010 census); 420 (2002 census); 297 (1989 Soviet census).

== Geography ==
Chadakolob is located 20 km north of Tlyarata (the district's administrative centre) by road. Chododa and Katroso are the nearest rural localities.
