= Tlyarata, Tlyaratinsky District, Republic of Dagestan =

Tlyarata Тлярата
- Village
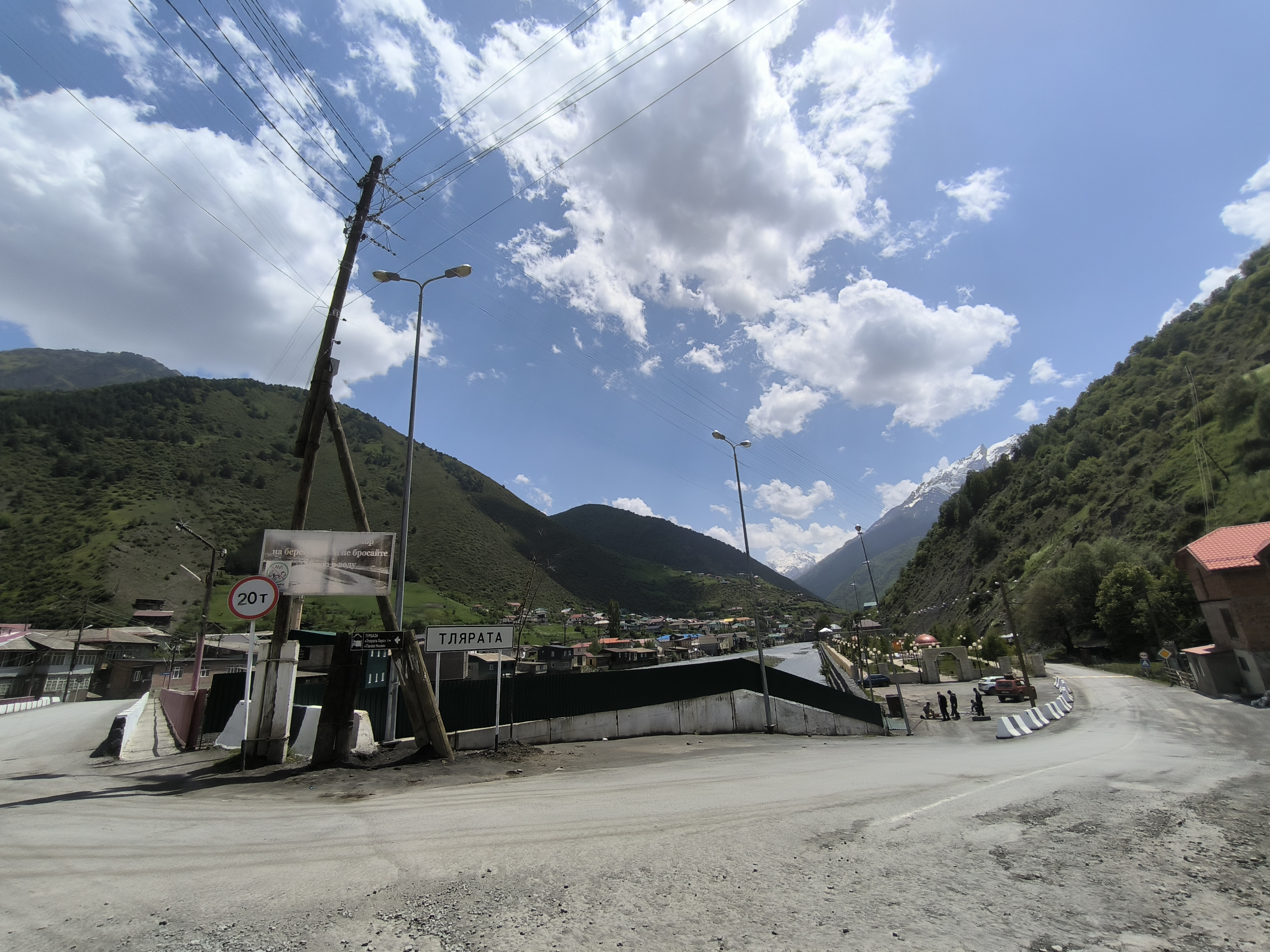
- Interactive map of Tlyarata
- Location of Tlyarata
- Coordinates: 42°06′28″N 46°21′15″E
- Country: Russia
- Federal subject: Dagestan
- Founded: 1926
- Elevation: 1,434 m (4,705 ft)

Population
  - Estimate (2021): 1,547 )
- Time zone: UTC+3 (MSK)
- Postal code: 368420
- Dialing code: +7 +7 87265
- OKTMO ID: 82651445101

Tlyarata (Russian: Тлярата; Avar: ЛъаратӀа) is a rural locality (a selo) in Russia. It is the administrative center of Tlyaratinsky District, Republic of Dagestan, Russia. It is located in the west of the republic of Dagestan in a mountainous area near Azerbaijan and Georgia.

Population: 1,200 (2010 census); 1,773 (2002 census); 1,265 (1989 Soviet census).

It is the home of World champion boxer Sultan Ibragimov.
