= Tlyaratinsky District =

Tlyaratinsky District Тляратинский район (Russian)
- District

Other transcription(s)
  - Avar: Лъаратӏа мухъ
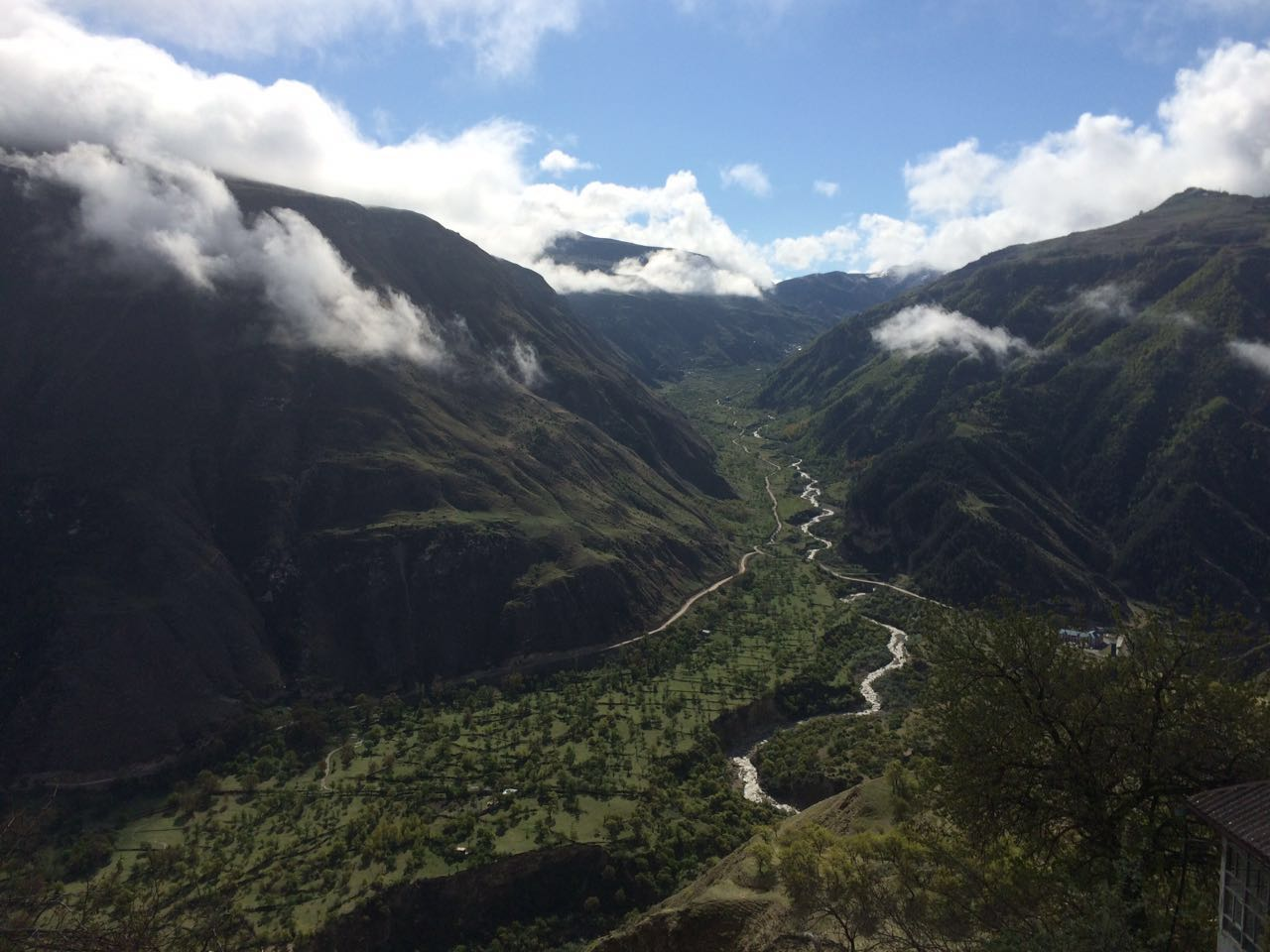
- Tlyaratinsky Nature Reserve, Tlyaratinsky District

- Coat of arms
- Location of Tlyaratinsky District in the Republic of Dagestan
- Coordinates: 42°06′N 46°20′E
- Country: Russia
- Federal subject: Republic of Dagestan
- Established: 1926
- Administrative center: Tlyarata

Area
  - Total: 1,611.5 km^{2} (622.2 sq mi)

Population (2010 Census)
  - Total: 22,165
  - Density: 13.754/km^{2} (35.623/sq mi)
  - Urban: 0%
  - Rural: 100%

Administrative structure
  - Administrative divisions: 17 Selsoviets
  - Inhabited localities: 89 rural localities

Municipal structure
  - Municipally incorporated as: Tlyaratinsky Municipal District
  - Municipal divisions: 0 urban settlements, 19 rural settlements
- Time zone: UTC+3 (MSK)
- OKTMO ID: 82651000
- Website: http://xn----8sba6bdmqod1k.xn--p1ai/

Population of Tlyaratinsky District
- 2010 Census: 22,165
- 2002 Census: 22,108
- 1989 Census: 15,693
- 1979 Census: 13,844

Tlyaratinsky District (Russian: Тлярати́нский райо́н; Avar: Лъаратӏа мухъ) is an administrative and municipal district (raion), one of the forty-one in the Republic of Dagestan, Russia. It is located in the west of the republic. The area of the district is 1,611.5 square kilometers (622.2 sq mi). Its administrative center is the rural locality (a selo) of Tlyarata. As of the 2010 Census, the total population of the district was 22,165, with the population of Tlyarata accounting for 5.4% of that number.

== Administrative and municipal status ==
Within the framework of administrative divisions, Tlyaratinsky District is one of the forty-one in the Republic of Dagestan. The district is divided into seventeen selsoviets which comprise eighty-nine rural localities. As a municipal division, the district is incorporated as Tlyaratinsky Municipal District. Its seventeen selsoviets are incorporated as nineteen rural settlements within the municipal district. The selo of Tlyarata serves as the administrative center of both the administrative and municipal district.
