= Dagestani Azerbaijanis =

Ethnic group in Dagestan

Dağıstan Azərbaycanlıları
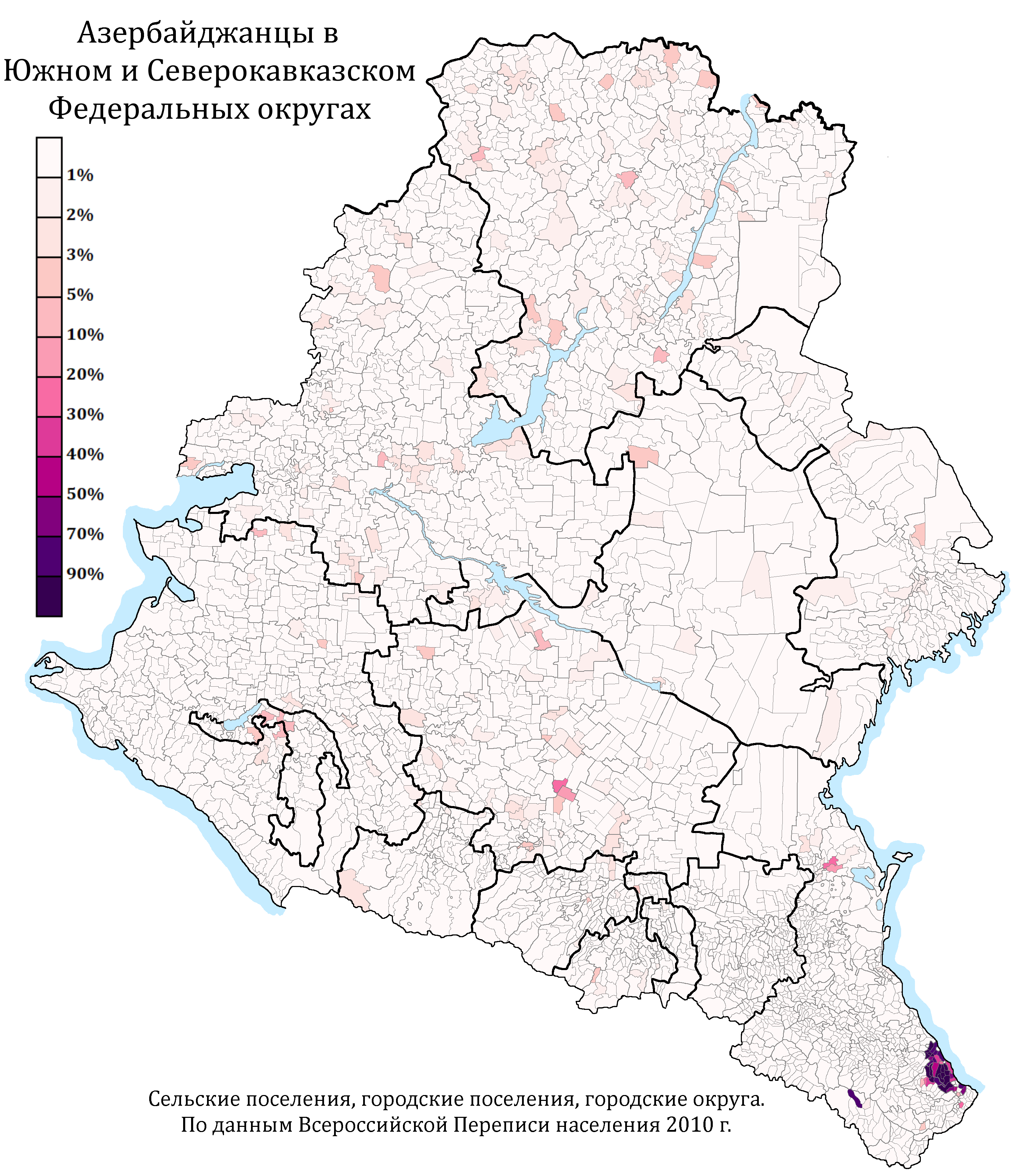

Regions with significant populations
- Derbentsky District; Derbent; Dagestanskiye Ogni; Tabasaransky District; Kizlyarsky District; Kizlyar; Magaramkentsky District

Languages
- Azerbaijani and Russian

Religion
- Islam

Related ethnic groups
- Azerbaijanis

Dagestani Azerbaijanis (Azerbaijani: Dağıstan azərbaycanlıları (Latin), Дағыстан азәрбајҹанлылары (Cyrillic); Russian: Азербайджанцы в Дагестане) are a segment of Azerbaijanis who have settled in Dagestan. According to the 2021 census, the Azerbaijani population in the Republic of Dagestan numbers 116,907 people, making them the seventh largest ethnic group in the region.

Dagestani Azerbaijani Turks hold an important place in the history of Dagestan. Particularly after the strengthening of Turkic tribes in the South Caucasus, the influence of Turks and Azerbaijani Turks began to grow in Dagestan as well, with the establishment of new settlements. During the Safavid Empire and the subsequent Afsharid dynasty, military campaigns in the region further strengthened the presence of Azerbaijani Turks.

The Azerbaijani Turkish language has played a significant role in the cultural and political life of Dagestan. In addition to having a strong influence on the languages of other indigenous peoples of Dagestan, it served for a long period as the main language of writing and communication. Furthermore, up until the mid-Soviet era, Azerbaijani was used as the primary language of education for several other ethnic groups in Dagestan.

== Emergence of Azerbaijani settlements ==
The issue of the ethnic formation of Azerbaijani Turks in Dagestan is examined within the inseparable context of the ethnogenesis of the Azerbaijani Turkish people as a whole. The ethnogenesis of Azerbaijani Turks in Dagestan involved the ancient indigenous population of Caucasian Albania (including Khazars, Kassites, Albanians, Masguts, etc.), who had intermingled with groups that invaded the region in the first millennium BCE, such as the Cimmerians, Scythians, Sarmatians, Huns, Bulgars, Khazars, and Pechenegs. Through successive waves of migration from Oghuz and Kipchak Turks, many of these local ethnic groups in the region also became Turkified by the 13th and 14th centuries. Over the following centuries, Azerbaijani Turks in Dagestan continued to receive migrations from the main parts of Azerbaijan, with most of them coming from the Quba and Shirvan regions.

M. Ibrahimov describes this process as follows:

In the first millennium BCE, the ancient indigenous population of Caucasian Albania (such as the Khazars, Kassites, Albanians, Masguts, etc.), who intermingled with the invaders, played a role in the formation of Azerbaijani Turks in Dagestan. This fusion included Iranic and Turkic-speaking groups, such as the Cimmerians, Scythians, Sarmatians, Huns, Bulgars, Khazars, and Pechenegs, as well as Iranian and Arab colonists. The new waves of conquest by Turkic-speaking groups, particularly Oghuz-Seljuks and to a lesser extent Kipchaks, in the 11th–13th centuries contributed to the completion of the Azerbaijani Turkish nation's formation, reflected in the replacement of local languages by Turkic languages. The ancestors of Azerbaijani Turks experienced migrations and civilizational disruptions during the 13th–14th centuries. The ethnic foundation of Azerbaijani Turks in Dagestan was further consolidated in the 15th–18th centuries through repeated migrations from Azerbaijan, primarily from Quba and Shirvan. In the first half of the 15th century, the Oghuz-Turcoman Qara Qoyunlu tribes occupied Dagestan, and researchers associate the Terekeme ethnonym and the transformation of the Terakeme people into a distinct ethnic group in Shirvan with this period.

The majority of such migrations occurred between the 15th and 18th centuries, further solidifying the Azerbaijani Turkic ethnic base in Dagestan.

Azerbaijani Turks have historically inhabited the city of Derbent and the adjacent plains (coastal and foothill areas), corresponding to present-day Derbent and partially Tabasaran districts. According to A. V. Komarov, the village of Qullar in Derbent emerged when one of the khans of Derbent settled his servants (qullar) there. Similar accounts exist for other Azerbaijani Turkic villages.

=== Legends ===
According to legend, the name of the village Yersi, populated entirely by Azerbaijani Turks, derives from the word əsir (prisoner), which evolved into its modern form over time. Another version suggests that the name originates from the Tabasaran word yarsa (old), indicating that its inhabitants were an autochthonous community.

A. V. Komarov, citing a legend from that period, states that the residents of Ərəblər village were descendants of Arabs who came from the village of Ərəblər near Shamakhi.

The name Velikent is associated with a man named Veli from Quba, who, according to legend, gave the village its name. The name of Padar village is linked to a man named Padarkhan, a native of the Büyük Padar village in Azerbaijan, who migrated there. According to information provided by residents of Salik village, the inhabitants of modern Terekeme villages in Dagestan trace their ancestry to migrants from Shirvan, Quba, and other areas. Additionally, some claims suggest that individuals who established the Kumyk villages of Qayakənd and Velikənt originally came from Lahij. One resident, interviewed by a researcher, noted that his father had come from the Büyükşıxlar village in Quba. The founding of Mamedkala village in Derbent District, Dagestan, is attributed to Fath-Ali Khan of Quba. According to Ivan Hajinsky:

After becoming estranged from his uncle, the usmi, Mohammad Khan was warmly received and influenced by Fath-Ali Khan of Quba, who built a residence-fortress for him 20 versts north of Derbent, named Mohammad Khan Fortress. Fath-Ali Khan of Quba relocated 200 families from Quba to this area and appointed Fath-Ali Khan of Quba to govern the fortress.

The name of Yuxarı Calğan village appears in records dating back to 1723. This village is located at the summit of Çalğan Mountain and was settled by Azerbaijani Turks during the reign of Fath-Ali Khan of Quba. According to legend, people were brought here from Quba to defend Derbent, and unlike other settlements, they were granted special privileges.

=== Formation of Nizhny Qatrukh ===
Currently, the only Azerbaijani village in Dagestan is located in the Rutul region, known as Lower or Nizhny Qatrukh (Aşağı Qatrux in Azerbaijani). It lies between the Rutul village of Ihrek (İhrek) and the Lak villages of Arakul and Upper Qatrukh (Yuxarı Qatrux in Azerbaijani). Although situated in the Lak region, until the early 18th century, Nizhny Qatrukh was administratively connected to the village of Vaçi. In the Lak language, the village is referred to as "Luv Chaatlux".

According to some local accounts, this area once hosted a garden belonging to a ruler of Gazikumukh Khanate, who settled seven individuals there. These included two Lezgins, two Azerbaijani Turks, and three Laks. The narrative suggests that the inhabitants of Qatrukh are descendants of these seven individuals. Over time, Azerbaijani Turkic became the dominant language of communication in the village. Another version recounts that the ruler of Gazikumukh, Surkhay I, after waging war against the Afsharid ruler Nader Shah, settled prisoners of war captured from Nader Shah's army in this area, marrying them to Lak women. According to this tradition, the current residents of Nizhny Qatrukh are descended from these individuals.

Linguist N. S. Dzhidalaev, who studied the Azerbaijani Turkic dialect of Nizhny Qatrukh, also addressed the village's origin story. He proposed that Azerbaijani Turkic emerged as a common language among the Rutuls, Tsakhurs, Laks, Avars, and Lezgins of the Kara-Samur River basin. Dzhidalaev linked the spread of Azerbaijani Turkic to the settlement of Turkic prisoners of war in the region, which provided the necessary linguistic factors to facilitate the adoption of Azerbaijani Turkic. This, he argued, created a bilingual environment where Lak coexisted with Azerbaijani Turkic, but over time, Azerbaijani Turkic supplanted Lak as the sole spoken language in the village.

Residents of Nizhny Qatrukh are associated with other historical accounts. For example, inhabitants of the neighboring Rutul village of Ihrek referred to the residents of Nizhny Qatrukh as "lyk" (slave). Within the village itself, one neighborhood is known as "Mugallar" (Muğallar), a term commonly used for Azerbaijani Turks in the Dagestan region. Other neighborhood names, such as "Qatırqılar" and "Samançıyar", suggest connections to migrants from Shirvan.

In pre-revolutionary academic literature, the residents of Nizhny Qatrukh were often described as originating from Gazikumukh Khanate and the Lak population. For instance, the 1857 Caucasus Calendar identified the village as being inhabited by Sunni, Avar-speaking Lezgins. Similarly, an 1860s settlement list compiled by A. Komarov categorized Nizhny Qatrukh as a Lak village. By 1884, the village was classified as a Sunni, Rutul village, but its inhabitants’ language was noted as Turkish (Azerbaijani Turkic). An 1888 study of settlements in Dagestan described the inhabitants as Sunni Lezgins but recorded that they spoke Tatar (a term historically used for Azerbaijani Turkic). Linguist P. K. Uslar, who studied the Lak language in the 1860s, noted that “they speak Azerbaijani Turkic in Nizhny Qatrukh” within the Gazikumukh region. Historian Hasan Alkadari wrote in 1891 that the residents of Qatrukh in the Samur region spoke Azerbaijani Turkic. In 1929, Ali Hasanov edited his father's works and noted that certain communities in Qatrukh also spoke the Gazikumukh (Lak) language. The 1926 census identified the inhabitants of Nizhny Qatrukh as Turks, later classified as Azerbaijanis under terminology adopted in the 1930s. This census further affirmed that the Azerbaijani language had become the dominant language of the village.

=== Villages in the Tabasaran District ===
Alongside the village of Nizhny Qatrukh, the current situation in the Tabasaran District remains quite complex. German linguist and ethnographer A. Dirr notes that some of the modern Azerbaijani inhabitants of the area are Turkified Tabasarans. Ethnographer L. I. Lavrov believes that the names of Azerbaijani villages such as Arkit, Arak, and Yersi have Tabasaran origins, and their inhabitants once spoke this language. Neither the statistical materials from the 19th century and early Soviet period nor historical data provide clarity on when these settlements were established or the origins of their inhabitants.

In the past, Yersi was one of the Arab settlements. According to the Caucasus Calendar of 1857, the village was inhabited by Sunni Lezgins and Tatars (i.e., Azerbaijani Turks). Additionally, Tats are reported to have resided in the village. A source from 1869 states that the inhabitants of Yersi spoke Azerbaijani Turkic. All pre-revolutionary sources refer to the inhabitants of Yersi as Tatars (Azerbaijani Turks). However, according to the 1926 census, one Tabasaran and one Dargin individual were also residing in the village.

The residents of Darvag (Tabasaran: Vaäkkdä) claim descent from Arabs. They interpret the name of the village as "dar väkyan" ("house of discourse") or "dur bak" ("stand up and look" in Azerbaijani). It is known that in the 8th century, the Umayyad commander al-Jarrah destroyed the village of Khazars. After that, Arab military commander Yazid ibn Asad moved Arab families from Damascus and placed them in this village. In 1840, Abbasqulu Bakikhanov wrote that everyone in the area already spoke Azerbaijani Turkic. Similar claims can also be found in the works of Hasan Alkadari. According to the Caucasus Calendar of 1857, Darvag was inhabited by Lezgins, Tatars (Azerbaijani Turks), and Tats. In the 1860 list of settlements compiled by A. Komarov, Turkic language is listed as the language of Darvag's inhabitants. All pre-revolutionary sources identify Darvag's residents as Tatars (Azerbaijani Turks). According to the 1897 census, only 912 individuals in Dagestan reported Arabic as their native language, and A. N. Genko believed that these were residents of Darvag. The 1926 census, like earlier records, identifies the inhabitants of Darvag as Azerbaijani Turks. Additionally, one Jewish individual was also recorded in the village.

Although Azerbaijani Turks lived in Darvag and Yersi, archival sources present conflicting information. These sources indicate that Tabasarans resided in Arkit, with traces of "Tatar" influences in the population and language. According to the Caucasus Calendar of 1857, Arkit (ﺍﺮﻜﻴﺪ) was settled by Sunni "Lezgins" speaking Tatar (Azerbaijani Turkic). Another source notes that the residents were Sunni Tatars, whose native language was Azerbaijani Turkic. However, the case differs for Yersi and Darvag. Archival sources indicate that the ethnic origins of these villages’ residents are linked to Turkic languages. Pre-revolutionary sources and the 1926 census confirm that Tabasarans also lived in Arkit. Soviet ethnographer N. G. Volkova observes that while the inhabitants of Arkit's lower neighborhoods spoke Azerbaijani, the residents of the upper neighborhoods spoke Tabasaran. Nevertheless, outsiders referred to and identified all residents as Tabasarans.

== History ==
A portion of the Azerbaijani Turks were part of the Tabasaran Maysumate for an extended period. During the 16th and 17th centuries, the Maysumate was divided into Qadi, Maysums, and various communal groups. Additionally, the population of the Maysumate was not homogenous, comprising Tabasarans, Azerbaijani Turks, Lezgins, and Tats. The territory of Qadilik included villages such as Rukel, Kemakh, Mitagi, Mugarty, Zidyan, Bilgadi, Gimeydi, Maraga, Darvag, Zil, and others.

Bakikhanov noted that the Azerbaijani Turks residing in the region during this period were Terekeme (nomadic herders). According to his account, the Terekeme settled in the region during the reign of Sultan Ahmad of the Kaitag Utsmiate in the 16th century, establishing the Terekeme district. Archival materials indicate that these people came from the opposite side of the Sulak River, as well as from Quba, Shamakhi, Lankaran, and other parts of the South Caucasus. However, some 19th-century authors provide entirely different information. Historian Shikhaliev attributes their arrival to the campaigns of Nader Shah, suggesting that they came not from the South Caucasus but from further south. Kumyk prince Abdulmajid Hamzayev also affirmed their origins in Iranian provinces but argued that their arrival occurred earlier than claimed by other sources. N. Semyonov stated that these people came from various regions, primarily from Iranian provinces. Similarly, Prince Ali Khamzin emphasized their origins in Iran. The most extensive study of Azerbaijani Terekeme was conducted by S. Hajiyeva. She concluded that the Terekeme were already living in Dagestan by the 16th century, suggesting the possibility of their earlier arrival and noting their migration from Azerbaijan, specifically mentioning the Shirvan region. Consequently, she deemed the information provided by Bakikhanov to be the closest to the historical truth.

Among the Azerbaijani population living in the region, oral traditions and stories about their migrations have been preserved. These accounts suggest that the disintegration of settlements within Dagestan, famines, foreign invasions, and conflicts between feudal lords played a significant role in these internal migrations. For instance, in the 1770s, as a result of conflicts between the Kaitag Utsmi and the Khanate of Quba, seven Terekeme villages were destroyed and plundered. According to folklore, Terekeme settlements such as Şebede, Shahbaz, and Mehret were destroyed at various stages of the 18th century and subsequently converted into pasturelands.

Following the annexation of the Derbent Khanate by Russia, an imperial decree was issued granting control over the area, excluding the city of Derbent, to Tarki Shamkhal Mehdi as a reward for "his service and loyalty to the imperial throne". Thus, the Ulus Mahal, along with nine settlements, became part of the Tarku Shamkhalate. These settlements included Arablar, Azadoğlu, Belidçi, Dzhalgan, Qullar, Mollakənd, Mollakhalil, Selik, and Nyugdi. The descendants of Shamkhal Mehdi continued to retain possession of these lands until 1883, when a directive ordered the transfer of the residential and non-residential properties of the Tarki Shamkhalate in Ulus Mahal to state administration.

For a long period, the Azerbaijani Turks in Dagestan lived under feudal relations. Three-quarters of the Terekemes were "raiyyat", while the remaining portion occupied an intermediate position between "raiyyat" and the upper class. Almost all the land was under the control of the beys, with only small plots of land belonging to individual families or endowed to mosques as waqfs. Social administration and judicial matters were traditionally based on Sharia law and customary practices.

The ethnic kinship between the Terekemes and other segments of the Azerbaijani Turkic population facilitated their integration. The process of Turkification was most notable among the Tat- and Arabic-speaking populations. On a smaller scale, Turkification also occurred in Tabasaran villages and around Derbent from the 16th to the 20th century. Consequently, the number of Azerbaijani Turks in Dagestan steadily increased due to other ethnic groups adopting the Azerbaijani Turkic language and eventually integrating into Azerbaijani identity. Additionally, some Terekeme groups settled in the Kumyk plain of Northern Kumykia and, over time, assimilated into the Kumyk population.

According to Decision No. 191 adopted by the State Council of Dagestan on October 18, 2000, Azerbaijanis were officially recognized as an indigenous people of Dagestan.

Clause 40 of the Moscow Declaration (2022) obliges each entity within the Russian Federation "to ensure the preservation, protection, and development of the historical, cultural, and religious heritage, as well as the ethnic, linguistic, and cultural uniqueness of national minorities residing within their territories." Within this framework, conditions must be created for every ethnic group to actively participate in the socio-political, cultural, and socio-economic life of their communities in accordance with national legislation.

== Ethnodemography ==
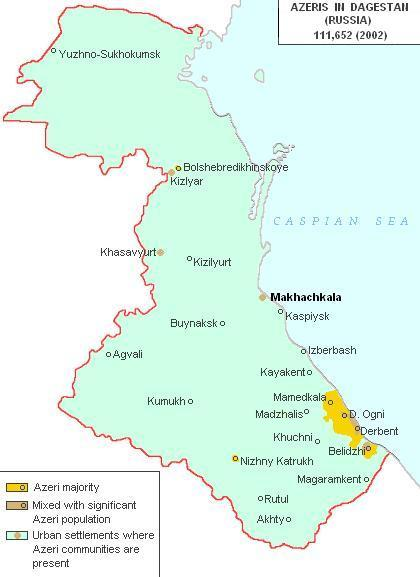
Map of Dagestan. Regions with Azerbaijani population are shown in yellow.

=== Settlements ===
The Azerbaijanis have traditionally resided in southern Dagestan. Azerbaijanis themselves are divided into two groups. The first group, referred to as "Azerbaijanis," primarily live in the Derbent and Tabasaran regions, while the second group, known as "Terekemeler", is located north of Derbent.

In the Tabasaran region, Azerbaijanis inhabit villages such as Maraga, Kheli, Pendzhi, Zil, Yekrag, Darvag, Arak, Sanaq, and Yersi. Some Azerbaijani-inhabited areas in Tabasaran are bilingual. These bilingual settlements include Khuchni, Arkit, and Khyuryak. In Arkit, the bilingual population comprises both Azerbaijanis and Tabasarans.

The Azerbaijani Turks of Dagestan, particularly the Terekemes, live compactly in the following villages of the Derbent district: Berikey, Velikent, Delichoban, Dzhemikent, Gedzhukh, Karadagly, Kala, Mamedkala, Padar, Salik, Segelər, Tatlar, Ullu-Terekeme, and Chinar. A portion of the Terekemes, who are ethnically mixed with the Kumyks, also reside in Kostek and Temiraul villages of the Khasavyurt, Kızılyurt, and Chontaul districts. In Kostek, the neighborhood inhabited by Terekemes is called Terekemeaulu.

In addition to the main settlements of Azerbaijanis in Dagestan, there are three villages surrounded by non-Azerbaijani settlements. One of these is called Nizhny Katrukh. The other two, located close to each other in the Kizlyar region, are named Bolshebredikhinskoe and Persidskoye. Azerbaijanis in Dagestan primarily reside in Derbent but also inhabit mountainous, hilly, and flat regions. Hajiyeva compiled a list of the villages inhabited by Tərəkəmələr and Azerbaijanis. She mentions villages south of Derbent such as Eghlabi, Arablar, Mollakent, Bayat, Mollakhalil, Kullar and others, as well as hilly villages around Derbent such as Muhgartı, Kemakh, Qimeydi, Rukel, Mitagi, Dzhalgan, and Zidyan. In the Tabasaran region, she lists villages such as Darvag, Zil, Sanak, Arak, and others. N. R. Dadanov, identifies Ziydan, Bilgadi, Mitagi, Muhgartı, Kemakh, and Darvag as mountainous Azerbaijani settlements. The only Azerbaijani village explicitly recognized as mountainous is Nizhny Katrukh.

According to the 2010 census, the Azerbaijani population figures are as follows:

Name of settlement	% Percentage of Azerbaijanis
Derbentsky District	58,0 %
Derbent (city)	32,3 %
Dagestanskiye Ogni	23,1 %
Tabasaransky District	18,4 %
Kizlyarsky District	2,3 %
Magaramkentsky District	1,6 %
Kizlyar (city)	1,5 %

=== Population ===
In the second half of the 16th century, the Tabasaran Principality was divided into two parts: the northern section, known as Qadism, with its center in Khuchni, and the southern section, centered in the village of Jarrah. According to E. I. Kozubski, 5,379 Azerbaijani Turks resided in Northern Tabasaran at that time.

During the era of Russian Empire, the Azerbaijani Turks of Dagestan lived in the Derbent Governorate of the Caspian Oblast, and later, after 1860, in the Derbent Governorate of the newly established Dagestan Oblast. Additionally, they resided in the Kaytago-Tabasaranskiy okrug and the city of Derbent. In 1866, the Chief of Staff of the Russian Army in Dagestan, A. V. Komarov, wrote that Azerbaijani Turks were composed of Turkic tribes and spoke the Turki-Azerbaijani language. According to Komarov's report, Azerbaijani Turks at that time lived in 29 localities in Dagestan, with a total population of 18,250. Of these, 11,649 lived in the Derbent city area, while 6,601 resided in the Kaytago-Tabasaranskiy okrug.

Family censuses conducted in 1886 revealed that 13,697 Azerbaijanis lived in Dagestan, comprising 2.31% of the total population. According to the encyclopedic dictionary Brockhaus and Efron written in 1893, there were 11,473 Azerbaijani Turks in Dagestan. The 1897 general census indicated a population of 32,143 Azerbaijani Turks in the region. In 1902, military orientalist and Lieutenant General N. N. Belyaevsky, who commanded an expedition of officers from the Caucasus Military District to the Chechen, Dagestan, and Lezgi lines, stated that the number of Azerbaijani Tatars (i.e., Turks) was 20,000. He noted that they resided along the coastline of the Kaytago-Tabasaranskiy okrug and in the Derbent area, and that they were predominantly Sunni Muslims.

In the early 21st century, while the national population growth rate was 12%, the growth rate of Azerbaijanis in Dagestan reached 18.5%, the highest in the country. Furthermore, their mortality rate was also low, at 6.5%. According to the first Soviet census conducted in 1926, 23,428 Azerbaijanis lived in Dagestan, although at the time, they were recorded as Turks in the census. By the 2010 census, their population had reached 130,919.

In the city of Derbent, Azerbaijanis constitute 31.75% of the population, slightly fewer than the Lezgins.

1926	1939	1959	1970	1979	1989	2002	2010	2021
23 428	31 141	38 224	54 403	64 514	75 463	111 656	130 919	116 907

According to censuses, the number of Azerbaijanis in the administrative units of Dagestan:

Area	2002			2010			
Area	General	Azerbaijani	%	General	Azerbaijani	%	
Dagestan	50,278 km^{2}	2 576 531	111 656	4.33%	2 910 249	130 919	4.50%
Derbentsky District	821 km^{2}	86 494	50 247	58.09%	99 054	57 476	58.02%
Derbent	69,6 km^{2}	101 031	32 064	31.74%	119 200	38 523	32.32%
Tabasaransky District	801 km^{2}	54 732	8 896	16.25%	52 886	9 731	18.40%
Dagestanskiye Ogni	9,3 km^{2}	26 346	6 917	26.25%	27 923	6 465	23.15%
Makhachkala	498 km^{2}	545 258	6 750	1.24%	696 885	6 333	0.91%
Kizlyarsky District	3047 km^{2}	57 748	1 506	2.61%	67 287	1 584	2.35%
Magaramkentsky District	654,6 km^{2}	58 694	539	0.92%	62 195	1 021	1.64%
Kizlyar	32,3 km^{2}	51 024	892	1.75%	51 707	804	1.55%
Kaspiysk	32,9 km^{2}	77 650	676	0.87%	100 129	797	0.80%
Khasavyurt	38,5 km^{2}	121 817	765	0.63%	131 187	795	0.61%
Rutulsky District	2170 km^{2}	23 503	603	2.57%	22 926	359	1.57%
Buynaksk	20,95 km^{2}	61 437	403	0.66%	62 623	344	0.55%
Izberbash	22,9 km^{2}	40 987	395	0.96%	55 646	274	0.49%
Tarumovsky District	3020 km ²	28 587	266	0.93%	31 683	225	0.71%
Kizilyurt	23,7 km^{2}	47 679	94	0.20%	43 421	128	0.29%
Kayakentsky District	640 km^{2}	52 739	57	0.11%	54 089	88	0.16%
Kumtorkalinsky District	1270 km^{2}	21 053	83	0.39%	24 848	60	0.24%
Yuzhno-Sukhokumsk	91,7 km^{2}	9 777	52	0.53%	10 035	56	0.56%
Kaytagsky District	678,24 km^{2}	26 870	23	0.09%	31 368	37	0.12%
Khasavyurtovsky District	1425 km^{2}	125 454	42	0.03%	141 232	33	0.02%
Karabudakhkentsky District	1460 km^{2}	60 620	38	0.06%	73 016	29	0.04%
Babayurtovsky District	3262,3 km^{2}	41 331	24	0.06%	45 701	24	0.05%
Dokuzparinsky District	376,9 km^{2}	14 330	22	0.15%	15 357	23	0.15%
Suleyman-Stalsky District	666,3 km^{2}	54 036	8	0.01%	58 835	23	0.04%
Kurakhsky District	740 km^{2}	15 206	124	0.82%	15 434	22	0.14%
Sergokalinsky District	528,4 km^{2}	29 665	12	0.04%	27 133	22	0.08%
Kizilyurtovsky District	524 km^{2}	70 440	36	0.05%	61 876	20	0.03%
Khivsky District	620 km^{2}	20 747	17	0.08%	22 753	18	0.08%
Levashinsky District	830 km^{2}	64 371	8	0.01%	70 704	18	0.03%
Buynaksky District	1842,09 km^{2}	65 018	10	0.02%	73 402	18	0.02%
Nogaysky District, Dagestan	9000 km^{2}	21 685	12	0.06%	22 472	15	0.07%
Novolaksky District	218,2 km^{2}	22 019	7	0.03%	28 556	15	0.05%
Kazbekovsky District	583,8 km^{2}	33 140	1	0.01%	42 752	15	0.04%
Botlikhsky District	687,9 km^{2}	50 469	3	0.01%	54 322	14	0.03%
Akhtynsky District	1120 km^{2}	31 592	8	0.03%	32 604	13	0.04%
Dakhadayevsky District	760,4 km^{2}	38 359	4	0.01%	36 709	7	0.02%
Untsukulsky District	560 km^{2}	27 460	18	0.07%	29 547	6	0.02%
Laksky District	750 km^{2}	12 382	4	0.03%	12 161	3	0.02%
Gunibsky District	609,5 km^{2}	25 106	13	0.05%	25 303	3	0.01%
Agulsky District	793,5 km^{2}	11 290	3	0.03%	11 204	2	0.02%
Charodinsky District	1010 km^{2}	11 792	0	0.0%	11 777	2	0.02%
Tlyaratinsky District	1611,5 km^{2}	22 108	9	0.04%	22 165	2	0.01%
Kulinsky District	649 km^{2}	10 760	0	0.00%	11 174	1	0.01%
Gergebilsky District	341,9 km^{2}	18 366	1	0.01%	19 910	1	0.01%
Shamilsky District	920 km^{2}	26 053	1	0.01%	28 122	1	0.01%
Khunzakhsky District	551,91 km^{2}	30 203	2	0.01%	31 691	1	0.01%
Akushinsky District	622,8 km^{2}	52 455	0	0.00%	53 558	1	0.01%

==== Demographics of the Azerbaijani community in Derbent ====
Vasily Bartold, discussing the 15th-16th centuries, writes:

By this time, Derbent was no longer described as an Arab city but rather as a Turkic one... We have no information about when or how the Arab population was replaced by the newly arrived Turkic population. This process is clearly linked to the gradual Turkification of Azerbaijan and the northwestern parts of Iran from the Seljuk dynasty onwards. In any case, the aforementioned name Seyfaddin al-Sulami suggests that in the 12th century, Arabs rather than Turks predominated in Derbent.

A Venetian traveler named D. Ancello also mentions the "Tatars" of Derbent. Ilya Petrushevsky notes that these "Tatars" referred to Azerbaijanis but also adds that Europeans at the time used terms like "Tatar" and "Turk" to describe various Turkic-speaking groups. An anonymous 15th-century traveler and merchant reported in his account that the inhabitants of the areas surrounding Derbent spoke both Circassian and Turkic languages. He explained that these languages belonged to the Caucasian and Turkic language families. Based on these observations, A. E. Krishtopa concludes:

By the late 15th century, the ethnographic composition of the Derbent region already resembled that of the modern era: Derbent was inhabited by Dagestanis and Azerbaijanis.

Over time, the number of Azerbaijani Turks in Derbent began to change due to the population relocation policies implemented by various dynastic rulers. These rulers preferred to strengthen their control in the region by relocating more Turkic tribes to the city. When Safavid ruler Shah Ismail I captured Derbent in 1510, he relocated 500 families from the Rumlu and Qaramanlu tribes to the city. Shah Ismail later facilitated the relocation of families from the Bayat tribe as well. In 1540, Shah Tahmasp I relocated 400 families from the Qizilbash tribes to Derbent. During the reign of Shah Abbas I, Sunnis in Derbent faced pressure and were expelled from the city. Shah Abbas stationed a Qizilbash garrison in the city and subsequently relocated 400 families from the semi-nomadic Bayat and Ustajlu tribes to Derbent. In 1638, the German traveler Adam Olearius visited the city and provided detailed information about it. According to his account, the city was divided into three sections. The highest part of the city was inhabited by the ruler and his 500 soldiers, armed with cannons, who were recruited from the Ayrimli and Koydursha tribes. The middle part of the city was inhabited by Iranians, while the lower part, named "Sheher-Yunan" (City of the Greeks), was settled by Greeks. In 1873, A. V. Komarov wrote that the Turkic tribes living in Derbent still stood out for speaking the Turkic-Azerbaijani language. This suggests that, up until the 1870s, the Azerbaijanis of Derbent not only maintained a distinct ethnic identity but also preserved some tribal distinctions.

After the annexation of Dagestan by Russia, Russian statistical records often referred to the Muslim population of Derbent. Addressing this issue, Z. Mahmudova argues that references to "Muslims" in early 19th-century statistics likely referred to Azerbaijanis. She bases this claim on two points: first, that non-Azerbaijani urban populations were generally small in both the South and North Caucasus; and second, that there is no evidence in early 19th-century records of any Muslim population in Derbent apart from "Turk Tatars" or "Azerbaijani Tatars." Mahmudova believes that while some Dagestani ethnic groups living near Derbent at the time might not have had a clear ethnic identity, they spoke languages other than Azerbaijani Turkic. As a result, local authorities might have classified them as "mountaineers" or "Lezgins".

In 1836, a Russian author wrote:

The residents of Derbent differ little from Muslims living in other cities outside the borders of the Caucasus, particularly, and likely, those of common origin from Baku. However, in appearance, they do not resemble their neighbors—the inhabitants of the mountains. Any highlander can be easily distinguished in a group of Derbent residents.

In the 1860s and 1870s, Mountain Jews and Russians also became part of the population of Derbent, but Azerbaijanis still constituted the majority. According to information from 1886, 8,697 Azerbaijanis lived in Derbent, followed by 1,830 Jews. In 1902, the city's police chief reported to the Regional Statistical Committee that the upper part of the city was inhabited by Tatars, while the southern neighborhood was populated by Jews. E. Kozubski noted that the population of Derbent primarily consisted of “Azerbaijani Tatars of the Shia sect.” He also observed that Azerbaijanis were often mistaken for Persians, despite having no commonalities beyond their shared sect.

Statistics from 1926 indicate that 7,831 Turks (i.e., Azerbaijanis) lived in the city. They were followed by 6,597 Jews, 5,499 Russians, 868 Lezgins, 812 Armenians, 432 Persians, and others. Despite the long-standing majority of Azerbaijanis in the city, this began to change in the second half of the 19th century due to significant urbanization. This process led to a substantial influx of Lezgins, Aghuls, Tabasarans, and other Dagestani peoples into Derbent. By the 2002 census, Lezgins had surpassed Azerbaijanis in number. At that time, Lezgins constituted 32.6% of the population, while Azerbaijanis made up 31.7%.

== Religion ==
According to Hajiyeva, the majority of Azerbaijanis in Dagestan adhere to Sunni Islam, while a minority are followers of Shia Islam. The Dagestani Terekemes are also Sunni, belonging to the Hanafi madhhab. At the end of the 19th century, Hasan Al-Qadari wrote that while the majority of the population in Derbent and several villages in the Ulus Mahal region adhered to Twelver Shi'ism, the Terekeme were Hanafi Sunnis.

The introduction of Shi'ism to Dagestan is generally dated to the 16th century. According to Hajiyeva, Shah Ismail I of the Safavid dynasty compelled the Sunni Shafi'i population of Derbent to convert to Shi'ism after capturing the city in 1509. Another account suggests that following his conquest of Shaki, Shirvan, Baku, Derbent, and other regions, Shah Ismail began promoting the doctrine of Imam Ali in these territories.

Representatives of the Russian provincial administration noted:

The fact that the population of Derbent predominantly consists of followers of Ali and is generally loyal to the Russian government is politically significant, given that the entirety of Dagestan is predominantly Sunni. This was demonstrated during the siege of the fortress by Ghazi Muhammad in 1831: neither his fanatical exhortations nor the large number of highlanders he brought to the city walls had any effect. The residents [of Derbent] steadfastly repelled all attacks and later actively assisted the Russians in driving out the Dagestani forces.

According to the results of the 1897 census, of the 32,143 Azerbaijanis living in the Dagestan province, 32,127 were Muslim, ten were Eastern Orthodox Christians, and three were Jews.

=== Ashura in Derbent ===
The Shiites of Derbent, like their fellow believers elsewhere, commemorate the events of 680 on the tenth day of the Islamic month of Muharram, known as Ashura. The earliest account of the "Shakhsey-Vakhsey" ("Shah Husein - Vah Husein") ceremony in Derbent was left by the 18th-century traveler I. Ya. Lerch. This ceremony was also documented in the Azerbaijani language by the Derbent scholar Mirza Karim bey Shuai (d. 1895).

On this day, Shiite Muslims recite elegies of mourning and lamentation ("mərsiyyə" in Azerbaijani) and organize special theatrical reenactments of key episodes from the events of the Battle of Karbala. Ashura in Derbent has distinct characteristics: some of its rituals differ from those practiced in Azerbaijan and Iran. Moreover, there are discrepancies between the popular interpretation of the event and the fatwas of Shiite theologians.

During the first ten days of Muharram, Shiites attend mosques to read sacred Shiite texts and the Quran. Adolescents, if they wish, engage in self-flagellation using iron chains. On the ninth day, individuals fulfilling "nəzir" perform sheep sacrifices, distributing the meat to the poor. The culmination occurs on the evening of the tenth day (Ashura), when Derbent's Shiites gather at the Juma Mosque to perform religious ceremonies. By nightfall, participants disperse to nearby homes, where gatherings of relatives and friends take place. These gatherings involve readings of sacred texts, and the ceremony of "Shakhsey-Vakhsey", referred as a "Husayniyya". Late at night, closer to dawn, participants proceed down a street to the Caspian Sea, where they cast written notes with their wishes into the water. Similar practices are observed in Iran and Republic of Azerbaijan.

Before dawn, believers reconvene at the mosque and its courtyard, where, at the designated time (marking the hour of Imam Husayn’s martyrdom), sayyids (descendants of the Prophet) present a portrait of Imam Husayn. After the portrait is carried in procession, white pigeon are released in the courtyard, symbolizing peace. Following this, participants return home. Throughout Ashura, including the night, Shiites are expected to remain awake.

Scholars tend to view Ashura as a "marker of identity for the Azerbaijani Shiite population of the city".

== Language ==
The Azerbaijanis of Dagestan speak the Derbent and Terekeme dialects of Azerbaijani Turkic. The Azerbaijani dialect spoken in the village of Nizhny Katrukh also stands out due to its unique features, bearing influences from the Lak language. While the Derbent dialect belongs to the eastern group of Azerbaijani dialects, the Terekeme dialect resembles the Quba and Shamakhi subgroups within the eastern dialects. The spoken language of all Azerbaijanis in Dagestan—whether the Terekeme people, urban residents of Derbent, or those living in Tabasaran—has been influenced by the languages of neighboring communities, particularly Tat and Kumyk.

According to the 2010 census, out of 130,919 Azerbaijanis in Dagestan, 129,620 listed Azerbaijani as their native language, while 426 identified Russian, 161 Lezgian, 110 Tabasaran, 45 Dargwa, 44 Avar, 37 Kumyk, 18 Aghul, 16 Tat, 10 Lak, 10 Rutul, 3 Andi, 1 Karata-Tukita, and 1 Tsakhur as their native languages.

=== As a lingua franca ===
Over centuries, particularly in southern Dagestan, Azerbaijani functioned as a lingua franca for interethnic communication. It was widely used among various ethnic groups for mutual understanding, especially during the 16th and 17th centuries. Ethnographer and statistician Nikolay Zeidlich also noted the use of Azerbaijani Turkic as a common spoken language in this part of Dagestan. A source from 1836 recorded that local Muslims in Derbent used "Tatar" (referring to Azerbaijani or Turkic), and that this language was "widely spoken not only among Muslims but also among Armenians and Jews".

In the Samur region of Dagestan, Azerbaijani became particularly prevalent during the 18th and 19th centuries. It was used as a common communication language among the peoples living in the Samur Valley. This function of Azerbaijani was also documented by P.K. Uslar, a 19th-century expert on the Caucasus and its languages.

Until the 19th century, Azerbaijani, alongside Kumyk and Avar, served as a lingua franca in the highlands and plains of Dagestan. K.F. Gan, who visited Dagestan in the late 19th century, remarked, "Practically all of Dagestan recognizes the Turkic-Tatar language as a kind of international language." However, he also observed varying levels of fluency in Azerbaijani Turkic among Dagestan's diverse ethnic groups:

As for the Turkic-Tatar language spoken by my companion... it proved to be of great assistance to us in the Samur district, but it was less understood in Kazikumukh and completely foreign to the Avars.

A.K. Becker, a botanist and entomologist who visited southern Dagestan, wrote:

The Turkic-Azerbaijani dialect is gradually and rapidly replacing the Tat dialect. Due to its importance for communication with the Muslim regions of the South Caucasus and the residents of Derbent, this dialect has also spread among the highlanders who are willing to learn it. Additionally, this same dialect is frequently used by highlanders who are often kin to its speakers but initially spoke languages incomprehensible to them.

According to Hasan Alkadari, multilingual individuals, when meeting or communicating with each other, would either speak Azerbaijani or Chagatai Turkish (i.e., Kumyk). He notes that they managed their affairs "somehow" by using "corrupted speech expressions" such as "how are you" or "where are you from". It is also evident from the notes of other authors that a large portion of the mountain peoples of Dagestan used the Azerbaijani Turkic fluently. For instance, the Latvian writer Birznieks-Upītis, who visited Dagestan, observed that "conversations are held in the Tatar language, in the Azerbaijani dialect. This is the spoken language used by the local Russians and all adult Lezgins with a rugged accent". Russian linguist and ethnographer L.P. Zagursky similarly recorded the following:

The Azerbaijani dialect has deeply rooted itself in the southeastern regions of Dagestan: mountaineers from rather remote areas come to Derbent and often engage in unpaid labor just to learn the Tatar language... Moreover, we have personally witnessed the Azerbaijani dialect beginning to spread even in the hard-to-reach mountainous regions of Dagestan. The Andians, or the mountaineers of this part of Dagestan, who visit the Muslim provinces of the South Caucasus for trade purposes, speak the Tatar language completely fluently.

Among the Aghul people, "only those who went to Azerbaijan as migrant workers ("otkhodnikov") could speak Azerbaijani". A similar situation existed in the Lak village of Khosrekh. Through the activities of these seasonal workers, referred to as otkhodniks, the Azerbaijani language began to spread among the Archins. In villages such as Kirki and Varsit, inhabited by Dargins, Azerbaijani became the second language after their native Kaitag language. In fact, Dargin families would send their children to stay with Azerbaijani families for 3–4 months to learn the language.

In the Akhty school, which was the first secular school in the Samur region and opened on September 26, 1861, two languages—Russian and Azerbaijani—were taught. Azerbaijani teacher and ethnographer Mahammadhasan Afandiyev worked there for some time to teach the Azerbaijani language. In the early 20th century, the first plays performed by the Lezgin national theater were written and staged in Azerbaijani. It is worth noting that the first Lezgin national theater was established in 1914.

Although they were Lezgin, Rutul, or Tabasaran, many Dagestani poets not only wrote works in Azerbaijani but also drew inspiration from literary works in this language for their own writings. Lezgin poet Ashig Suleyman Stalsky communicated in Azerbaijani with E. Kapiyev, the literary critic, writer, and poet who translated his works into Russian (Kapiyev himself was of Lak ethnicity). At the 1940 folklorists' congress, Kapiyev stated:

While preparing an interlinear translation and working on what is called editing, Suleyman dictated and explained his poems to me in Turkish [Azerbaijani Turkish].

Between 1923 and 1928, Azerbaijani was the sole language of instruction in schools across Dagestan. The ideologists of Dagestan's national state-building, taking advantage of the autonomy granted by the Soviet government, also emphasized the importance of the Turkic language. N. Samurski, Secretary of the Central Executive Committee of the Dagestan Autonomous Soviet Socialist Republic, believed that local schools should exclusively teach in the Turkic language, arguing that the locals harbored strong resentment towards Russian, while other local languages lacked the capacity to serve as mediums of education. Karpov noted this as follows:

If we consider the plan that, in the near future, all Dagestani intelligentsia would speak and write in [Azerbaijani] Turkic, then Russian would have to abandon all official use.

During the 1926 census, personal records in the Kura, Samur, and Kaitag-Tabasaran districts were prepared exclusively in Turkic. At the time, the Azerbaijani language was referred to as "Turkic." In other parts of Dagestan, these records were prepared in Russian. Dagestan's first journal on culture, education, literature, and arts, "Maarif Yolu" (Path of Education), was published in Azerbaijani. Additionally, in 1932, the Qızıl Çoban (Red Shepherd) newspaper, published in the village of Rutul, the center of the Rutul people, was also in Azerbaijani. However, from 1928 onwards, local languages began to replace Azerbaijani, starting with Kumyk, which was prioritized initially. By 1933, an accelerated development of 11 languages (expanding to 12 by 1936) was underway as part of the broader Soviet linguistic policy.

From 1936 to 1994, the emblem of the Dagestan ASSR featured inscriptions in multiple languages, including Azerbaijani, stating "RSFSR," "Dagestan ASSR," and "Workers of the World, Unite".

Even by the mid-20th century, Azerbaijani remained a lingua franca among various ethnic groups in southern Dagestan. In the early 1950s, Soviet ethnographer L. Lavrov observed:

In southern Dagestan, Azerbaijani is almost universally the second language.

He reported that Rutuls used their native language at home, work, and gatherings, but when individuals unfamiliar with their language (such as Lezgins or Tsakhurs) were present, conversations often shifted to Azerbaijani. Furthermore, Azerbaijani was used as the written language for administrative work in Rutul villages, such as collective farms and village councils. Libraries in the region were predominantly stocked with Russian-language books; for instance, of the 1,000 books in the library of a reading room in the village of Shinaz, only 30 were in Azerbaijani.

Historically, Azerbaijani Turkic had been the primary language of instruction in the Aghul village of Burshaq, while in the village of Tsirkh, this role was performed by the Dargin language. In other areas inhabited by Aghuls, Lezgin was used as the medium of instruction. From 1938 to 1952, Azerbaijani served as the language of instruction in schools in Tsakhur villages, though it was later replaced by Russian. Even in 1952, Azerbaijani remained the primary language of instruction in many schools in Rutul villages. Children entering these schools already had some knowledge of Azerbaijani and were able to use basic phrases in the language. In 1938, one of the reasons cited for the impracticality of creating a written language for Rutuls was their widespread knowledge of Azerbaijani, which was described as "a developed language". Ethnographer L.I. Lavrov stated that "the Rutuls universally know Azerbaijani, a developed language". Another ethnographer, G.A. Sergeyeva, remarked on the Rutuls:

It makes no sense to create a written language for a small group of people who already know the language of their Azerbaijani neighbors, which has an established literary tradition.

In the Rutul village of Khnov, 90–95% of the population spoke Azerbaijani, which they also used in interactions with Lezgins inhabiting much of the surrounding region. The influence of Azerbaijani persisted among the Tsakhur people. By 1952, 88% of Tsakhurs in Dagestan spoke Azerbaijani, and this figure remained high, at 87.9%, in 1982. A 1960s study of the Archi people revealed that 6% of them spoke Azerbaijani.

=== Linguistic interactions with other languages ===
During the long-term interaction between two ethnic communities, bilingualism emerged, leading to the displacement of other languages by Azerbaijani as the primary medium of communication. By the late 18th and early 19th centuries, Azerbaijani Turkic had already become the second language of the Tabasarans. This influence intensified during the 1860s. The process of Azerbaijani replacing the Tabasaran language occurred predominantly in southern Tabasaran. In northern Tabasaran, which was relatively distant from Azerbaijani settlements, only the male population could speak Azerbaijani, and the influence of the language was weaker compared to the south. For the Tabasarans, the Azerbaijani language played the role not only of the language of a close neighbor with whom they had economic, family, and domestic ties (including frequent intermarriage between representatives of these two ethnic groups) and whose trade routes passed through; it was through it that they could communicate with the Azerbaijanis of Derbent on trade matters.

Instances of losing their native language continued into the second half of the 19th century. For example, in the 1870s, linguist and ethnographer L.P. Zagursky observed that the Tabasarans were gradually forgetting their native language, which was being replaced by Azerbaijani. A.K. Becker also wrote about this phenomenon during the same period:

The Turkic-Azerbaijani dialect has a significant influence on some mountain languages, and the Tabasarans living near Derbent are increasingly forgetting their native language.

The Brockhaus and Efron Encyclopedic Dictionary, published between 1890 and 1907, also contains similar remarks:

Due to close ties and continued interaction with the latter [referring to Azerbaijani Turks], the Tabasarans are adopting their Azerbaijani dialect and gradually forgetting their native language.

This process persisted into the second half of the 20th century. In 1959, during a visit to Tabasaran, L. Lavrov wrote:

The Tabasaran language is being almost entirely replaced by Azerbaijani, which is known by nearly everyone in the region.

The phenomenon of other peoples speaking Azerbaijani was also documented by German linguist and ethnographer A. Dirr, who studied the languages of Dagestan in the early 20th century:

Among the Tabasarans, knowledge of the Tatar language [referring to Azerbaijani] is widespread, especially in the eastern and southern parts of Dagestan, though women generally do not know it.

At the same time, Dirr classified Tabasaran as one of the Turkic languages:

In the Tabasaran language, there is a strong tendency to harmonize vowels in a word—this is a characteristic feature of the Turkic-Tatar language.

According to his observation, Azerbaijani influenced not only the vocabulary, but also the grammar of the Tabasaran language.

The phenomenon of daily-use languages like Tabasaran disappearing under the influence of Azerbaijani was also observed in regions where Azerbaijanis interacted with Tats. This occurred more intensively in areas of Dagestan where these groups cohabited. For the Tats, speaking the language of their larger neighbors was considered essential for conducting trade with them. Furthermore, knowing Azerbaijani was not only important for communication with Azerbaijanis but also with other southern Dagestani peoples who spoke the language. Thus, a Tat speaker of Azerbaijani could engage in trade and communication with both Azerbaijanis and non-Azerbaijanis in the southern regions of Dagestan.

The process of Azerbaijani replacing the Tat language was also noted in the 19th century by A.K. Becker. A.V. Komarov, the mayor of Derbent, reported on the Tat villages in the area, observing that the Tat language was gradually being replaced by the Turkic-Azerbaijani language. Some time later, another observation was made by anthropologist K. M. Kurdov:

...The Tats are avoiding speaking their own language... The residents of Rukel village have collectively decided not to speak Tat anymore, and now only a few elderly individuals can understand words in Tat, while the rest of the population speaks Tatar. A similar negative attitude towards their native language can be observed among the residents of other Tat villages.

According to the 1926 census, 7.2% of Tabasarans and 7.3% of Tats identified Azerbaijani as their native language. The 2010 census further revealed that Azerbaijani was the mother tongue for 361 Tabasarans, 169 Lezgins, 99 Dargins, 23 Kumyks, 22 Avars, 17 Russians, 15 Laks, 14 Rutuls, 13 Aguls, 6 Tsakhurs, 5 Armenians, 3 Ossetians, 2 Tatars, 1 Jew, and 1 Chechen.

Expressions derived from Azerbaijani are commonly encountered in Dagestani languages, particularly in those spoken in Southern Dagestan. Within the Lezgic language group, Azerbaijani loanwords occupy a prominent position in the lexicon compared to other Turkic borrowings. This can be attributed to the geographical proximity of Azerbaijani speakers and the long-standing socio-economic, cultural, historical, and trade relationships shared between these communities.

The modern Tabasaran lexicon contains a significant number of borrowings from Azerbaijani. These include various compound expressions, such as "işlətmiş apub" (“has used”), "baxış apub" (“has looked”), "qarşılamuş apub" (“has met”), and "təbrik apub" (“has congratulated”). This linguistic influence has even introduced vowel harmony, a characteristic feature of Azerbaijani, into the Tabasaran language. In terms of agricultural terminology, Azerbaijani loanwords are particularly abundant in the Lezgian language compared to other Dagestani languages. Words like "alça" (plum), "bostançı" (melon grower), "yemiş" (melon), "meyvə" (fruit), "taxıl" (grain), "tum" (seed), "üzüm" (grape), "xarman", "şel", and "şəftəli" (peach) have become integral to Lezgian but are notably absent in Avar, Dargin, and Lak languages.

=== Current situation ===
Currently, Azerbaijani is one of the official languages of Dagestan. (Note: The state languages of the republic, as stipulated by the Constitution, are Russian and all the languages of the peoples of Dagestan. However, only 14 languages—Russian, Avar, Aghul, Azerbaijani, Dargin, Kumyk, Lak, Lezgin, Nogai, Rutul, Tabasaran, Tat, Tsakhur, and Chechen—have their own written forms and function as state languages.) The Azerbaijani community in Dagestan publishes a newspaper titled "Dərbənd". Additionally, there are schools in Dagestan where education is conducted in Azerbaijani. Since 1978, the local office of the Russian Federation's radio in this region has been broadcasting daily programs in Azerbaijani for 30 minutes. Furthermore, since 1986, Azerbaijani-language television programs have been aired, amounting to an annual total of 6,340 hours.

== Culture ==
In 1935, the Azerbaijani State Drama Theater was established in Derbent. The city also regularly hosts the Sevinc Azerbaijani cultural festival.

=== Literature ===
The local arts and literary activities among Dagestani Azerbaijanis have historically flourished. Notable figures include the 16th-century poet Bayat Abbas, the 17th-century poet Mahsum Derbendi, and Dilyafruz Peri. Among Azerbaijani poets from Derbent, Zarnigar Derbentli (1722–1770), who married Aşıq Valeh, stands out. Her notable works include "Gəl" (Come), the epic "Valeh və Zarnigar", "Taleh və Həqiqət" (Destiny and Truth), and "Deyişmələr" (Dialogues), which features poetic exchanges between Zarnigar and Valeh.

From the 18th and 19th centuries onwards, literary traditions also developed among the nomadic Azerbaijani nomads known as Terekeme. Prominent figures in this tradition include Fathali (who died in the late 18th century), Mehrali, Khilase, and Pireli from Velikent. Others include Khalid Qaradağlı (active in the late 19th and early 20th centuries) and Minatullu Yusifli Padarli.

The Derbent school of ashik poetry includes notable poets such as Emin Yersili, Sefilli Memmed, Fathali Velikentli, Khalid Qaradağlı, Ahmed Khimeydili, Aslan Zidyanli, Gulbala Kemakhli, Gulbala Yuxarı Calğanli, Qara Qerib and İlyas Rukelli, Kezşahbəy, Tahirbəy, and Shah Ismail from Bilhədi, Afandi Yersili, Nurmohammad Deliçobanli, Niftulla Maratli, and Minatulla Khalilov from Velikent.

Since 1992, the Gülüstan Writers' Union, which unites authors writing in Azerbaijani, has been active in Derbent.

=== Literary works in Azerbaijani ===
The centuries-long historical and cultural ties between Azerbaijanis and the peoples of southern Dagestan, particularly the Lezgins, fostered the spread of Azerbaijani-language literary creativity among Dagestani authors. According to F. Vagabova, a Soviet-era critic of Dagestani literature:

The phase of bilingualism in southern Dagestan was marked by the emergence of literary works in the Azerbaijani language. This language, referred to in the mountainous regions as the "Turkic language," played an almost equal role in daily life and held an even higher status in literature compared to the local languages.

Under the influence of Azerbaijani ashiq literature, particularly the lyrical form known as qoşma, Lezgin literature developed its own qoşma poetry. Prominent Lezgin figures such as Said Kockhyurski (1767–1812)[176] and Mirza Ali Akhtinsky (1770–1859)[177] incorporated the Azerbaijani language into their literary works.

Yetim Emin (1838–1884), considered the founder of Lezgin written literature, composed his works in Arabic, Azerbaijani Turkic, and Lezgin. His grandfather Jalil and great-grandfather Abukar also preferred to write their poetry in Azerbaijani Turkic. Moreover, Yetim Emin was heavily influenced by the Azerbaijani poet Vagif, whose works he had been familiar with since childhood. This influence is evident in both his Lezgin and Azerbaijani-language writings. This feature is most characteristic of the early stage of his Azerbaijani-language creativity. Emin was the first to translate works by Fuzuli into Lezgin. One of his most renowned Azerbaijani-language works is titled "On the Capture of Shamil". Like Said Kocxyurski, Yetim Emin's literary works represent a written form of oral folk literature, reflecting a strong Azerbaijani literary influence.

Another notable Lezgin ashiq, Suleyman Stalsky (1869–1937), began his literary career by writing poems in Azerbaijani. Some of his best-known Azerbaijani-language works include "Mulle", "Caucasus", and "Kolkhoz". Additionally, he composed a poem that was presented at the First All-Union Congress of Soviet Writers. Stalsky's archive contains approximately 12 Azerbaijani-language poems, totaling nearly 500 lines.

Rutul poets such as Khazarchi Hajiyev and Jamisab Salarov also wrote parts of their literary works in Azerbaijani. Similarly, the Tabasaran poet Hajimammad Zyurdyagski (18th century) created Azerbaijani epics in both Tabasaran and Azerbaijani languages. Among the literary monuments significant to the Tabasaran people was the Azerbaijani epic "Ashiq Qarib".

=== Scientific literature in Azerbaijani ===
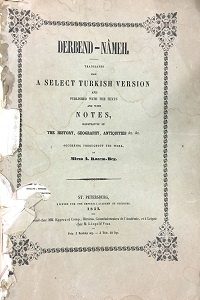
English translation of the Azerbaijani Turkic language version of Derbent-nameh: Derbend-Nameh or The History of Derbend. Translated from A select Turkic version and published with the texts and with notes, illustrative of The History, geography, antiquities &c. &c. occurring throughout the work, by Mirza A. Kazem Bey.

The first scholar active in Southern Dagestan, Haji Muhammad al-Zirdagi (1664/1669–1721/1728), wrote his scientific works in Azerbaijani. His contributions in this language include materials on the sciences, literary history, and ethnography. In addition to Azerbaijani, he also utilized Arabic and Persian in his works.

Mirza Hasan Alkadari (1834–1910), a prominent representative of Lezgian secular written literature, poet, and scholar, authored "Asar-i Dagestan" in Azerbaijani in 1892. This work contains a compilation of Eastern written sources on Dagestan's history, supplemented with Alkadari's observations and poetic additions.

Apart Persian, Kumyk, and Lak manuscripts of the renowned Caucasian work "Darbandname", there existed an Azerbaijani-language manuscript. This chronicle, based on extracts from Arabic and Persian sources, is generally regarded as the first historical work written in Azerbaijani. Its Russian translation was published in Tiflis by Maksud Alikhanov-Avarsky in 1898.

Among the Azerbaijani manuscripts of "Darband-nama", there is also the Rumyantsev catalog, compiled in the 17th century by Muhammad Awabi Aktashi based on the Persian version. V. V. Bartold claims that this manuscript was prepared in 1719. While Mirza Kazem Bey attributed it to 1731, Hasan Orasayev dated it to 1815–1816. Maksud Alikhanov-Avarsky stated that by the end of the 19th century, a person named Ilyaslu Khalil Bey, living in the Zagatala district, possessed an excellently preserved Azerbaijani version of this work, along with its Arabic manuscript. However, this claim has not been verified by anyone else.

The "Kitab-i Darband-name", completed by Superkhi in 1891, was also written in Azerbaijani and covers Dagestan's history from the 16th to the 19th centuries. Another historical work in Azerbaijani, "On the Acts of Ghazi Mollah Avari", was authored by Mirza Jabrayil. The author, Israfil Derbendi, the son of Superkhi, completed the work in 1893, dedicating it to the Caucasian War.

=== Music ===
In 1861, the Georgian historian and archaeologist P. Ioseliani visited the Akhty community living in Dagestan. Following this visit, he wrote the following about the activities of Lezgins ashigs (folk poets and singers):

The Akhty people enjoy singing songs accompanied by the chongur and the balaban (a pipe similar to a clarinet). Singers ashigs sometimes organize competitions, attracting performers from Quba (who are well-known), Nukha, and occasionally Yelizavetpol and Karabakh. The songs are performed in the Lezgian language, and even more often in Azerbaijani.

Mammadkhanov writes that Azerbaijani music predominated at Tabasaran weddings in the 1980s. Performing works by Azerbaijani singers is widely popular among contemporary Dagestani performers. Notable contemporary Dagestani performers such as Telman Ibrahimov, Minaya Pencaliyeva, Aslan Huseynov, Elbrus Canmirzoev, Pierre Aidjo, and Elchin Guliyev include songs in Azerbaijani in their repertoires.

== Traditional occupations ==
The primary occupation of the Azerbaijanis living on the coastal plains of Dagestan was agriculture, which had a multi-branch character. The main crops included grains, particularly wheat. Artificial irrigation was widely practiced, including the cultivation of rice paddies. A developed system of water distribution among villages through irrigation structures existed. Folk selection in Dagestan produced varieties of rice and wheat such as sari-bugda (also known as Istanbul-bugda or arnautka) and agh-bughda. A high-yielding wheat variety, Terekeme-bugda (Terekeme wheat), was particularly well-known. Saffron cultivation was also widespread. In the second half of the 19th century, the cultivation of madder, used to produce dyes for silk, wool, and cotton fabrics, expanded significantly. Madder farming and sericulture were ancient practices in the region, supplying products for external trade. Animal husbandry with a focus on meat and dairy production was another significant sector. A distinctive feature of local agriculture was the use of buffalo as draft animals. Key occupations of the Terekeme community included the extraction and sale of salt and oil, primarily to the highland populations.

Traditional crafts of Azerbaijanis in Dagestan included carpet weaving, goldsmithing, jewelry making, and woodworking, as well as stone carving, among others. Since the 1920s, the Industrialisation of the region has opened new opportunities for the population of Dagestan.

== Sources ==
- Гаджиева, Сакинат Шихамедовна (1999), Дагестанские азербайджанцы. XIX — начало XX в.: Историко-этнографическое исследование, «Восточная литература» РАН
- Ибрагимов, М.-Р. А. (2002), Азербайджанцы // Народы Дагестана / Отв. ред. С. А. Арутюнов, А. И. Османов, Г. А. Сергеева., Наука, ISBN 5-02-008808-0
- Махмудова, З. У. (2006), Взаимодействие этноконфессиональных общин в городской среде. Дербент XIX века // Русский сборник: Исследования по истории России. II., Moskow: Модест Колеров
- Исламмагомедов, А. И. (1981), Дореволюционное поселение дагестанских азербайджанцев // Быт сельского населения Дагестана (XIX — нач. XX вв.), Махачкала: Дагестанское учебно-педагог. изд-во Госкомиздата ДАССР
- Гаджиева, Сакинат Шихамедовна (1990), Дагестанские терекеменцы: XIX - начало XX в. (PDF), Наука
- Тексты, переводы, комментарии, введение и приложения Л. И. Лаврова (1966), Тексты, переводы, комментарии, введение и приложения Л. И. Лаврова. Эпиграфические памятники Северного Кавказа на арабском, персидском и турецком языках. Часть 1: Надписи X-XVII вв. / Тексты, переводы, комментарии, введение и приложения Л. И. Лаврова. Moskva. 1966.
- Хайдаков, С. М. (1961), Очерки по лексике лакского языка, Moskow: Изд-во АН СССР
- Лавров, Л. И. (1962), Рутульцы в прошлом и настоящем // Кавказский этнографический сборник, Moskow: Изд-во Академии наук СССР
- Джидалаев, Н. С. (1972), Об одном случае развития билингвизма в монолингвизм // Проблемы двуязычия и многоязычия, Moskow: Наука
- Рамазанов, Рамазанов Х. Х., Шихсаидов А. Р. (1964), Очерки истории Южного Дагестана, Махачкала: Дагестанский филиал Академии наук СССР
- Стратонова, В. В. (1911), Кавказский календарь на 1910 год, Тифлис
- Стратонова, В. В. Стратонова (1913), Кавказский календарь на 1912 год, Тифлис
- Козубский, Е.И. (1895), Памятная книжка Дагестанской области, Темир-Хан-Шура: Русская тип.
- Свод статистических данных о населении Закавказского края, извлечённых из посемейных списков 1886 г. (1893), издан по распоряжению Главноначальствующаго гражданскою частию на Кавказе Закавказским статистическим комитетом, Тифлис: Тип. И. Мартиросиянца
- Кавказский календарь на 1915 год (1916), Кавказский календарь, Тифлис: Канцелярия Кавказского Наместника
- Кавказский календарь на 1857 год (1858), Кавказский календарь, Тифлис: Канцелярия Кавказского Наместника
- Кавказский календарь на 1886 год (1886), Кавказский календарь, Тифлис: Канцелярия Кавказского Наместника
- Список населённым местам Дагестанской области (1888), Список населенным местам Дагестанской области. Составлен в 1888 г., Гор. Петровск: Иван-Турист
- Услар, П. К. (1890), Этнография Кавказа. Языкознание. IV. Лакский язык (PDF), Тифлис
- Алкадари, Г. (1929), Асари-Дагестан (исторические сведения о Дагестане) / Перевод Али Гасанов (Алкадари) (PDF), Махач-Кала: Изд. Дагестанского научно-исследовательского института
- Список населённых мест. (1927), Материалы Всесоюзной переписи населения 1926 года по Дагестанской АССР. Вып. 1. Список населённых мест, Махач-Кала: Изд. Дагстатуправления. 1927.Материалы Всесоюзной переписи населения 1926 года по Дагестанской АССР. Вып. 1. Список населённых мест
- Список населенных мест Дагестанской АССР (1927), Материалы Всесоюзной переписи населения 1926 г. по Дагестанской АССР. Выпуск 1. Список населенных мест Дагестанской АССР., Махач-Кала: Издание Дагстатуправления
- Гасанов, М. Р. (1994), Очерки истории Табасарана, Махачкала: Дагучпедгиз
- Волкова, Н. Г. (1983), Арабы на Кавказе, Советская этнография — № 2
- Списки населённых мест Дагестанской области (1869), Списки населённых мест Дагестанской области // Сборник статистических сведений о Кавказе. I., Тифлис
- Кавказский календарь на 1910 год (1911), Кавказский календарь, Тифлис
- Кавказский календарь на 1912 год (1913), Кавказский календарь, Тифлис
- Генко, А. Н. (1941), Арабский язык и кавказоведение // Труды второй сессии ассоциации арабистов 19-23 октября 1937 г., Изд-во АН СССР
- Волкова, Н. Г. (1966), Изменения в этнического составе сельского населения Северного Кавказа за годы Советской власти, Советская этнография № 1
- Алимова, Б. М. (1992), Табасаранцы (XIX — начало XX в.): Историко-этнографическое исследование (PDF), Махачкала
- Даданов, Н. Р. (1986), Некоторые сведения о материальной культуре азербайджанцев Дагестана // Археологические и этнографические изыскания в Азербайджане (1980-1981 гг.), Баку: Элм
- Сборник сведений о кавказских горцах (1875), Сборник сведений о кавказских горцах : издаваемый с соизволения Его Императорского Высочества Главнокомандующего Кавказской армией при Кавказском горском управлении, Тифлис
- Белявский, Николай Николаевич (1903), Отчёт главного руководителя полевой поездки офицеров Генерального штаба Кавказского военного округа в Чечне, Дагестане и на Лезгинской линии в 1902 году, Военная типография (в здании Главного Штаба)
- Ибрагимов, М.-Р. А. (2007), К истории формирования дагестанских азербайджанцев, Махачкала: Историко-культурные и экономические связи народов Дагестана и Азербайджана: через прошлый опят взгляд в XXI век. Материалы Международной научно-практической конференции, посвящённой 110-летию со дня рождения Азиза Алиева
- Бартольд, В. В. (1977), Сочинения. 3., Изд-во восточной литературы
- Петрушевский, И. П. (1944), Государства Азербайджана в XV веке (PDF), Баку: Известия АзФАН СССР - № 7.
- Криштопа, А. Е. (1970), Сведения западноевропейских путешественников XV века о Дагестане, Вопросы истории и этнографии Дагестана
- Капустина and Солоненко, Капустина Е. Л., Солоненко М. (2007), Шахсей-вахсей в Дербенте: традиция Ашуры в начале XXI в., СПб: МАЭ РАН: Лавровский сборник: Материалы Среднеазиатско-Кавказских исследований. Этнология, история, археология, культурология, 2006-2007
- Первая Всеобщая перепись населения Российской империи 1897 г. (1905), Первая Всеобщая перепись населения Российской империи 1897 г. LXII. Дагестанская область. 1905., Санкт-Петербург
- Баскаков, Н. А. (1960), Тюркские языки, Moscow: Изд-во Восточной литературы
- Muysken, Pieter (2008), Studies in language companion series. From linguistic areas to areal linguistics, John Benjamins Publishing Company, ISBN 978-90-272-3100-0
- История Дагестана (1967), С ДРЕВНЕЙШИХ ВРЕМЁН ДО КОНЦА XV В . (PDF), Moscow: Наука
- Сергеева, Г. А. (1989), Межэтнические связи народов Дагестана во второй половине XIX-XX вв. (этноязыковые аспекты). Кавказский этнографический сборник, Moscow: Изд-во Академии наук СССР
- Загурский, Л. П. (1880), Заметка об исследовании кавказских языков, Москва: Синодальной типографии
- Арзуманов, В. (1988), Азербайджанско-прибалтийские литературные связи, Баку: Элм
- Магомедов, Н. А. (2010), Культурные взаимосвязи народов Южного Дагестана и Азербайджана во второй половине XIX — начале XX в. (PDF), Махачкала: Вопросы истории Дагестана
- Казиев, С. М. (1965), Мамед-Гасан Эфендиев // Азербайджанский этнографический сборник. Вып. II., Баку: Изд-во АН Азербайджанской ССР
- Лезгины (1960), Лезгины // Народы Кавказа, Москва: Изд-во Академии наук СССР
- Мусаев, К. М. (1986), Путём сближения и единства (о роли связей в становлении и развитии лезгинской советской литературы), Баку: Элм
- Мусаев, К. М. (1974), Роль взаимосвязей в судьбах младописьменных литератур (По материалам лезгинской и некоторых других дагестанских литератур) // Живое единство. О взаимовлиянии литератур народов СССР, Москва: Советский писатель
- Grenoble, Lenore A. (2003), Language policy in the Soviet Union, Springer Science & Business Media, ISBN 978-1-4020-1298-3
- Карпов, Ю. Ю. (2007), Взгляд на горцев. Взгляд с гор: Мировоззренческие аспекты культуры и социальных опыт горцев Дагестана, СПб: Петербургское востоковедение
- Алпатов, В. М. (2000), 150 языков и политика. 1917—2000, Социо-лингвистические проблемы СССР и постсоветского пространства, Крафт+ИВ РАН
- Республика Дагестан: Административное устройство, население, территория (60-е годы XIX — 90-е годы XX в.) (2001), Республика Дагестан: Административное устройство, население, территория (60-е годы XIX — 90-е годы XX в.) (статистический справочник), Махачкала
- Лавров, Л. И. (1953), Рутульцы (PDF), Советская этнография — № 4.
- Шаумян, Р. М. (1941), Грамматический очерк агульского языка, Изд-во АН СССР
- Талибов, Б. Б. (2005), Цахурский язык // Языки Российской Федерации и соседних государств. Энциклопедия в 3-х томах., Наука, ISBN 9785020112674
- Сергеева, Г. А. (2005), Из истории этнографического изучения народов Горного Дагестана. Научный отчёт начальника Дагестанского отряда Г. А. Сергеевой об экспедиционной работе, проведённой в 1977 г., Полевые исследования Института этнологии и антропологии 2003
- Лавров, Л. И. (1982), Этнография Кавказа (по полевым материалам 1924 — 1978 гг.), Наука
- Волкова, Н. Г. (1967), Вопросы двуязычия на Северном Кавказе (PDF), Советская этнография — № 1.
- Курдов, К. М. (1907), "Таты Дагестана", Acta Historica: Труды По Историческим И Обществоведческим Наукам, 1 (1), Русский антропологический журнал — № 3—4: 135–137
- Загиров, В. М. (1987), Историческая лексикология языков лезгинской группы., Махачкала: Дагучпедгиз
- Ханмагомедов, Б. Г.-К. (1967), Табасаранский язык // Языки народов СССР, Иберийско-кавказские языки - Наука
- Джидалаев, Н.С. (1990), Тюркизмы в дагестанских языках: опыт историко-этимологического анализа, Наука, ISBN 5-02-011019-1
- Балаев, А. Г. (1986), Роль азербайджанского языка в этноязыковых контактах в доревоюционное время, Доклады АН Азербайджанской ССР. — № 7.
- Хурдамиева С. Х. . Махачкала. 2000., С. Х. (2000), Дастаны и ашугская поэзия дагестанских азербайджанцев : диссертация, Махачкала
- Вагабова, Ф. И. (1970), Формирование лезгинской национальной литературы, Махачкала
- Нарочницкий, отв. ред. А.Л. (1988), История народов Северного Кавказа (конец XVIII в. — 1917 г.), Наука
- Ярахмедов, М. (1992), Азербайджанская поэзия и Етим Эмин, Баку: Элм
- Большая советская энциклопедия (1952), САИДУ КОЧХЮРСКОМУ
- Гамзатов, Г. Г. (1982), Литература народов Дагестана дооктябрьского периода: типология и своеобразие художественного опыта, Наука
- Климович, Л. И. (1975), Наследство и современность: очерки о нац. литературах. Сов. писатель.
- Толстова, Под общ. ред. С.П. (1960), Народы Кавказа, Изд-во АН СССР
- Гаджиев, В. Г. (1975), О русском переводе "Дербенд-наме", Махачкала: Вопросы истории Дагестана (Досоветский период)
- Иманов, Г. (1936), Вопросы историографии Азербайджана. Наши достижения и ближайшие задачи, Баку: Наука в АССР за 15 лет
- Саидова, М.-С. (1997), Абдурахман из Газикумуха. Книга воспоминаний саййида Абдурахмана, сына устада шейха тариката Джамалуддина ал-Хусайни о делах жителей Дагестана и Чечни, Махачкала: Дагестанское книжное издательство. Редакция перевода, подготовка факсимильного издания, комментарии, указатели А. Р. Шихсаидова и Х. А. Омарова. Предисловие А. Р Шихсаидова
- Ганиева, А. М. (2004), Очерки устно-поэтического творчества лезгин [Essays on oral poetry of Lezgins] (in Russian and Lezghian), Moscow: Наука, ISBN 9785020327146, OCLC 57543280
- Казиев, Казиев Ш. М., Карпеев И. В. (2003), Повседневная жизнь горцев Северного Кавказа в XIX веке, Молодая гвардия
- Магомедханов, Магомедхан (2010), "Вавилонское столпотворение" (этноязыковые процессы в Дагестане)", Антропологический форум - № 13
- Kazem-Bek, Aleksandr (1851), Derbend-Nâmeh, St. Petersburg: Imperial Academy of Sciences
