= Rukel =

Rukel Рүкәл Рукель
- Selo
- Location within Republic of Dagestan Location within Russia
- Coordinates: 41°59′N 48°13′E
- Country: Russia
- Region: Republic of Dagestan
- District: Derbentsky District

Rukel (Russian: Рукель; Azerbaijani: Рүкәл, Rükəl) is a rural locality (a selo) in Derbentsky District, Republic of Dagestan, Russia. The population was 2,746 as of 2010. The village has an Azerbaijani-majority. There are 31 streets.

== Geography ==
Rukel is located 8 km southwest of Derbent (the district's administrative centre) by road. Dzhalgan and Nizhny Dzhalgan are the nearest rural localities.
