= Aglobi =

Aglobi Аглоби Әғлаби Агълаб Эгълеби
- Village
- Location within Republic of Dagestan Location within Russia
- Coordinates: 41°53′N 48°20′E
- Country: Russia
- Region: Republic of Dagestan
- District: Derbentsky District
- Elevation: 19 m (62 ft)

Population (2021)
  - Total: 1,771 people
- Time zone: UTC+3:00
- Postal code: 368617

Aglobi (Russian: Аглоби; Azerbaijani: Әғлаби, Əğlabi; Lezgian: Агълаб; Judeo-Tat: Эгълеби) is a rural locality (a selo) in Derbentsky District, Republic of Dagestan, in southern Russia.

== Geography ==
Aglobi is located 20 km south of Derbent (the district's administrative centre) by road. Aladash and Rubas are the nearest rural localities.

There are 31 streets.

== History ==
Aglobi is a former Mountain Jews village, first mentioned in 1813. The land on which the village was located belonged to the dynasty of Derbent rulers from the Aglobid family. Over time, Azerbaijanis from the village of Maraga, Tabasaransky region, also began to settle in the village. By the 30s of the 20th centuries, Jews completely left the village. In 1953, residents of the village of Tsiling Kurakhsky district, were resettled to Aglobi.

== Population ==
According to the materials of the All-Union Population Census of 1926 for the Dagestan Autonomous Soviet Socialist Republic, in Aglabi of the Kullar village council of the Derbent district lived: Mountain Jews - 165 people (45 households), Turks (Azerbaijanis) - 69 people (17 households), Lezgins - 12 (2 households).

According to the 2021 census, Aglobi had a population of 1,771.

Lezgins, Azerbaijanis and Tabasarans live there.

== Agriculture ==
The main activity of the population is growing garlic, peppers, and cucumbers for further sale in pickled form in various cities of Russia and the CIS. In a favorable climate, crops are cultivated: pomegranate, persimmon, persimmon-crown, figs, grapes, quince, etc.

Not far from the village there are salt lakes (“duzlahar”), from which the local population extracts table salt for pickling vegetables.
