= Belidzhi (selo) =

Belidzhi Belici Белиджи
- Selo
- Location within Republic of Dagestan Location within Russia
- Coordinates: 41°53′N 48°24′E
- Country: Russia
- Region: Republic of Dagestan
- District: Derbentsky District
- Time zone: UTC+3:00

Belidzhi (Russian: Белиджи́; Lezgian: Билиж; Azerbaijani: Белиджи, Belici) is a rural locality (a selo) in Derbentsky District, Republic of Dagestan, Russia. The population was 4,282 as of 2010. The village has an Azerbaijani-majority. There are 43 streets.

== Geography ==
Belidzhi is located 26 km southeast of Derbent (the district's administrative centre) by road. Novy Frig and Kullar are the nearest rural localities.
