= Novy Frig =

Novy Frig Новый Фриг
- Selo
- Location within Republic of Dagestan Location within Russia
- Coordinates: 41°51′N 48°21′E
- Country: Russia
- Region: Republic of Dagestan
- District: Khivsky District
- Time zone: UTC+3:00

Novy Frig (Russian: Новый Фриг) is a rural locality (a selo) in Khivsky District, Republic of Dagestan, Russia. Population: 1,776 (2021 census); 2,005 (2010 census); 894 (1989 Soviet census). There are 21 streets in this selo.

== Geography ==
It is located 37 km from Khiv (the district's administrative centre), 144 km from Makhachkala (capital of Dagestan) and 1,783 km from Moscow. Kullar is the nearest rural locality.
