= Kostek =

Kostek Костек
- Selo

Other transcription(s)
  - Kumyk: Кёстек
- Interactive map of Kostek
- Location of Kostek Kostek (Republic of Dagestan)
- Coordinates: 43°20′35″N 46°51′4″E
- Country: Russia
- Federal subject: Dagestan
- Administrative district: Khasavyurtovsky District

Population (2010 Census)
  - Total: 4,551
  - Estimate (2021): 6,394 (+40.5%)
- Time zone: UTC+3 (MSK)
- Postal code: 368025
- OKTMO ID: 82654444101

Kostek (Russian: Костек; Kumyk: Кёстек, Köstek) is a village (selo) in the Khasavyurt District of the Republic of Dagestan in Russia. As of the 2010 Census, its population was 4,551. It is the administrative center of the rural settlement of Kostekskogo.

== Geography ==
Kostek is situated to north-east of the city of Khasavyurt. Nearby settlements include Aknada and Yazykovka (Akaro) to the northeast, Kurush to the north-west, Chontaul to the south, and Novo-Kostek to the south-east.

== History ==
Kostek — settlement in Terek oblast of Khasavyurtovsky District. Population – 4588. A synagogue, 8 mosks, 1 school, 1 drinking establishment, 27 commercial and 16 industrial establishments. Residents — Kumyks.

— Brockhaus and Efron Encyclopedic Dictionary.

Kostek settlement is founded approximately in the 60s-70s of the 17th century by an Enderi prince Alish Khamzin. By the beginning of the 18th century, Kostek developed into a large settlement of Kostek Principality.

At midday I reached a Tatar-Kumyk village Kostek. It is situated near river Koysuv… The village stands on an open plain with approximately 200 houses which are made according to local traditions of clayed twisted rods. The village belongs to prince Khamurza from the Shamkhala family. Local residents are Kumyk Tatars and a few Armenians. Main crafts – agriculture and fishing. Here are good wheat and even bigger rice fields in the lowlands of river Koysuv… Small amounts of cotton are also produced here for sale. Silk is produced only for local use.

— J. Güldenstädt Reisen durch Rußland und im Caucasischen Gebürge. 1787-1791

By the middle of the 19th century, the settlement stopped being the centre of Kostek Principality, but became a significant local trade centre where fairs were organized every week. In 1876 a Russian school was opened, where children of rich Kumyk families were taught. Having finished this school they entered military academies and became officers of Russian Imperial Army.

By the beginning of the 20th century, Kostek developed into a large settlement of Terek oblast where apart from Kumyks lived several Russian, German, Jew and Chechen families.

According to another version the settlement appeared after fusion of Shebarla-Evl and khutor "Kostiyn-Otar"

Kosteki or Kostyukovskaya village on river Koysuv consists of about 300 homesteads. The same number of homesteads is in attached villages. This small district which has a common border with Andreev district and is governed by a special decree as it is owned by another princely generation. It is owned by seven brothers from the Alishev family. The eldest is Murtazali, others – Ustarkhan, Adil’, Aktol, Bammat-Murza, Omakhan and Hasay. The Alishev family has a patrimonial piece of land in Andreevskiy district and also some Nogay mountain villages. Kostyukovskaya village may supply no more than 600 armed men. River Koysuv abounds with fish. Sturgeons, starred sturgeons, salmons, carps, asps and others like herring harbour here. Despite the fact that the creek of this river is owned by Shamkhal Tatarskiy and is often blocked by his men, Andreev and Kostek fishermen give their take to Armenians and Russian manufacturers. This activity provides them sometimes with considerable earnings. The fish destined for local consumption is salted and sun-dried. Warm sulphur springs are situated near Kostyukovskaya village.

— S. Bronevskiy, Newest geographic and historic reports about Caucasus, 1823

== Trade ==
Kostek was one of the most prominent centres in northern Dagestan. "This place considering agriculture and cattle breeding is rather abundant. Moreover fishing here is fairly lucrative that's why local residents lead a quiet happy life", said about Kostek J. Reinegs. Kostek wasn't a big trade centre like Aksai and Enderi but given some archival sources it played a significant role in economic and trade relations not only among the population of Northern Caucasus but also with Russia. There were shops of Kizlyar Armenians. Representatives of authoritative Russian manufacturers bought cotton and madder selling goods of general use. It was highlighted that the main tradable commodity bought from Dagestan (especially from Zasulak Kumyks) was madder. The amount of supplies of this raw material for production of highly valued dye for textile industry of Russia constantly grew. In 1768 through Kizlyar customs about 18.000 kg of madder were transported to Russia, in 1772 – about 38.640 kg and in the second half of 1790 (from Enderi, Aksai, Kostek, Tarkov and Bashly) – about 51.392 kg. Therefore, in the 18th century such centres of local and external trade like Tarki, Aksai, Enderi and Kostek had a great impact on the development of economy of Northern Caucasus that met the vital interests both of Russia and the region.

It is also known that in the beginning of the 19th century the population of Enderi, Aksai and Kostek including Nogays sold in Kizlyar building timber, cheese, fish products, millet, etc.

=== Trade relations with Kizlyar ===
The trade between Kizlyar and aul Kostek situated on the left bank of river Koysuv was also at a significant level. Archival documents, reports of Karginskiy post in particular, which merchants frequented to get from Kostek to Kizlyar give an idea of goods they sold. In a document dated 4/XI-1761 is written that a merchant Nazar Artemyev brought from Kostek "two sacks of wheat, three sacks of proso, one basket full of clayware". In another reports from this post dated 14/II-1763 is noted that a Kizlyar merchant Baba Ismailov brought from Kostek "two small sacks of raw silk, one small sack of different silk and paper goods, one bag, three saddlebags and four small sacks full of almond and millet".

Due to above mentioned facts it seems incorrect to agree with the statement of N.P. Gritsenko that "residents of Kostek established trade relations with Kizlyar in the last quarter of the 18th century". We think that they were established far earlier and in the 50s-60s they became constant.

— Institute of history, language and literature of G. Tsadasy,1965

Not all goods brought from Enderi, Aksai and Kostek were produced there. These auls served as trade transit locations for the population of mountainous regions of Dagestan and Transcaucasus in their trade with Kizlyar and Astrakhan. This circumstance worried imperial authorities who were afraid that bought in Kizlyar goods would be brought customs-free through these settlements (residents of which were nationals of Russian Empire) to Dagestan and further to Transcaucasus and Iran.

That's why contrary to the decrees that no duty should be collected from Russian nationals, the imperial administration demanded payment of fees from inhabitants of Enderi, Aksai and Kostek that obviously provoked grievance from their part. In 1755 a Kostek voivode Alish Khamzin and Aksai prince Kaplan-Girey Akhmatkhanov wrote to Kizlyar governor that they and their subjects were Russian nationals "but when their subjects come to Kizlyar to buy horses, bulls, sheep and so on they are demanded to pay a fee. That's how Russians offend them…"

Two years later the Enderi inhabitants wrote to the Kizlyar governor about the same problem: "they consider us not to be Russian nationals…We have to pay duties like foreigners".

Tsarist administration tried to justify its actions arguing that Kumyk rulers ask Russian merchants to pay fees when they pass through their lands. Moreover, this money was used to pay taxes.

For example, in the 60s of the 18th century a Kizlyar merchant Melkum Davydov was a tax-farmer in Kostek and paid 70 rubles. However, not eager to exasperate Kumyk rulers the Kizlyar customs often did not force local residents to pay customs. It also ignored the decree that forbade the driving of cattle or horses to Kumyk settlements as well as abroad i.e. to Dagestan and other Caucasian territories. This decree which came into force due to the offensive of Nadir-shah army was abolished only in 1762. But life forced the Collegium of Foreign Affairs in 1747 (i.e. long before the interdiction) to issue a directive that allowed Russian nationals (including Kumyks) "who favoured Russian Empire" to buy horses. All these facts may lead to a conclusion that trade relations of Enderi, Aksai and Kostek with Kizlyar became more stable and diverse in the second half of the 18th century. They supplied Kizlyar with wheat flour, proso, fruits, nuts, raw silk, which was cheaper but comparable to the Kizlyar raw silk, silk tissue, handicrafts and madder.

=== Fishing ===
Given many historians the river Koysuv on which aul Kostek is situated was abundant in fish. J. Güldenstädt in the end of the 18th century wrote that not only sturgeons, starred sturgeons, catfishes, carps and asps harboured there. But he noted that there were no salmons which were in Terek river. But some time later in the beginning of the 19th century Semyon Bronevskiy in his description of river Koysuv mentioned salmons and Kizlyar herring (shamaya).

== Name ==
There exist several versions of the origin of its name. Given one of them it originated from the proper name Konstantin. Allegedly at the place of the settlement was a khutor of a Cossack named Konstantin. The time passed and Kumyk families started living in the khutor and they called the Cossack simply "Kostik", then the name transformed into "Kostek". In some Russian sources the settlement was also called "Kostyukovka".

Given another version the name has its roots in the phrase "kos tek" (which means in Kumyk language: "a lone hut"). Allegedly at the place of the settlement once lived an old man in a hut. In Turkic languages "kostek" means also "an obstacle". An old Kumyk name "Kostek" also existed.

== Population ==
By the end of the 18th century, there were about 200 households in the aul.

It is known that in the 19th century Kostek grew rapidly. D.S. Kidirniyazov in his book "Relations of Nogais with other people of Northern Caucasus and Russia in 16th – 19th centuries" wrote: "Settlement Kostek grew quickly. If in 1804 there were 300 households, in 1812 there were already 650"

In 1840 there were 2800 residents in Kostek.

According to different sources in the end of the 19th century there were 742 households in Kostek where lived 2300 people.

Population
2002	2010
3864	↗4551

As of the 2002 Census the majority of population consists of Kumyks – 3641 inhabitants (94,2 %). Apart from them also lived Chechens – 72 inhabitants, Avars – 70 inhabitants and others.
