= Padar, Republic of Dagestan =

Padar Падар
- Selo
- Location within Republic of Dagestan Location within Russia
- Coordinates: 42°12′N 48°03′E
- Country: Russia
- Region: Republic of Dagestan
- District: Derbentsky District
- Time zone: UTC+3:00

Padar (Russian: Падар) is a rural locality (a selo) in Derbentsky District, Republic of Dagestan, Russia. The population was 2,266 as of 2010. There are 17 streets.

== Geography ==
Padar is located 26 km northwest of Derbent (the district's administrative centre) by road. Velikent and Karadagly are the nearest rural localities.

== Nationalities ==
Azerbaijanis and Dargins live there.
