= Karadagly, Republic of Dagestan =

Karadagly Карадаглы Гарадағлы
- Selo
- Location within Republic of Dagestan Location within Russia
- Coordinates: 42°11′N 48°02′E
- Country: Russia
- Region: Republic of Dagestan
- District: Derbentsky District
- Time zone: UTC+3:00

Karadagly (Russian: Карадаглы; Azerbaijani: Гарадағлы, Qaradağlı) is a rural locality (a selo) in Tatlyarsky Selsoviet, Derbentsky District, Republic of Dagestan, Russia. The population was 788 as of 2010. There are 12 streets.

== Geography ==
Karadagly is located 28 km northwest of Derbent (the district's administrative centre) by road. Tatlyar and Padar are the nearest rural localities.

== Nationalities ==
Azerbaijanis live there.
