= Velikent =

Velikent Вәликәнд Великент
- Selo
- Location within Republic of Dagestan Location within Russia
- Coordinates: 42°11′N 48°04′E
- Country: Russia
- Region: Republic of Dagestan
- District: Derbentsky District
- Time zone: UTC+3:00

Velikent (Russian: Великент; Azerbaijani: Вәликәнд, Vəlikənd) is a rural locality (a selo) in Derbentsky District, Republic of Dagestan, Russia. The population was 4,239 as of 2025. The village has an Azerbaijani-majority. There are 47 streets.

== Geography ==
Velikent is located 24 km northwest of Derbent (the district's administrative centre) by road. Padar and Karadagly are the nearest rural localities.
