= Chinar, Russia =

Chinar Чинар
- Selo
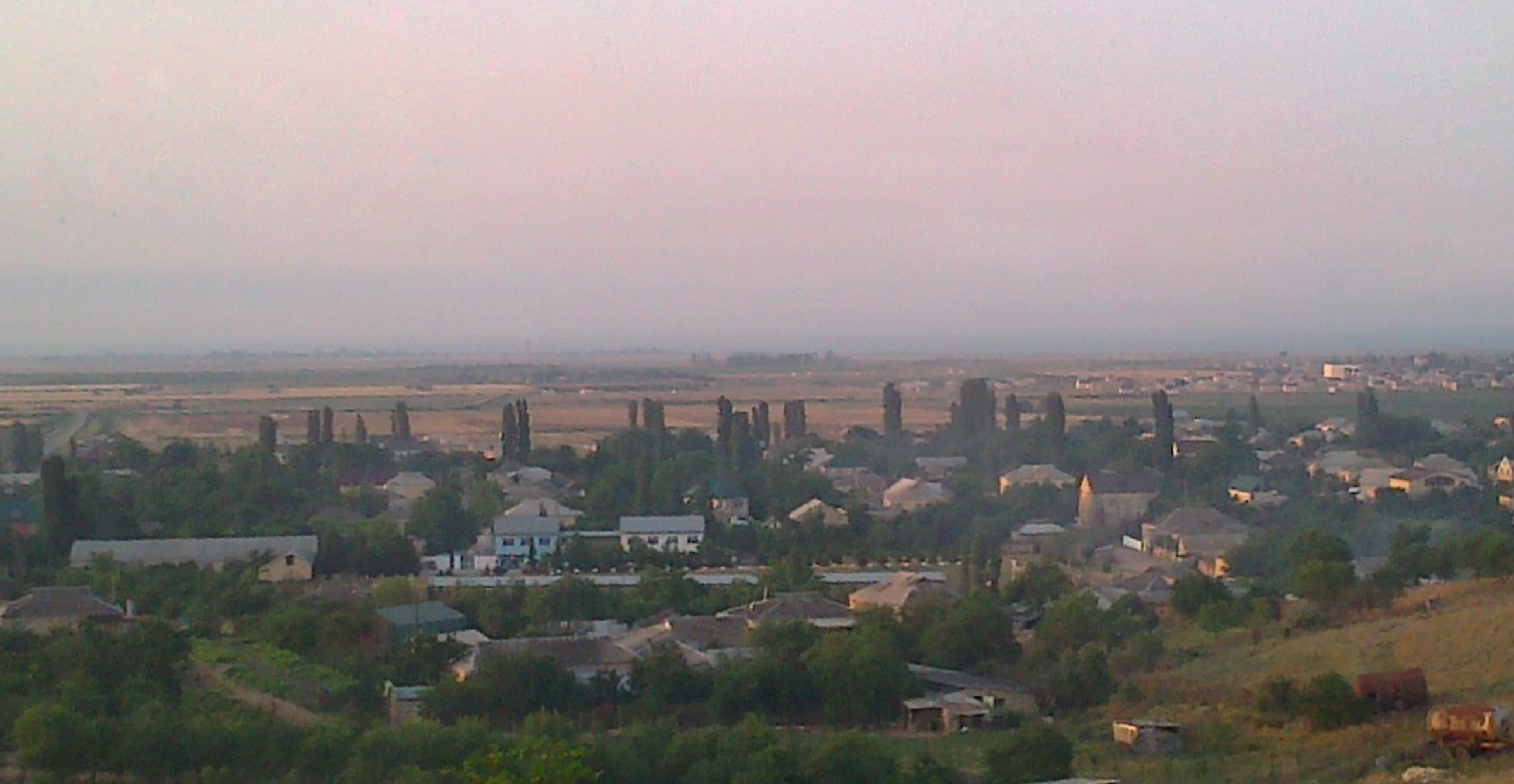
- Chinar skyline and landscape
- Interactive map of Chinar
- Location of Chinar Chinar (Republic of Dagestan)
- Coordinates: 42°06′27″N 48°08′38″E
- Country: Russia
- Federal subject: Dagestan
- Administrative district: Derbentsky District
- Selsoviet: Chinarsky Selsoviet
- Founded: 1952

Population (2010 Census)
  - Total: 5,227
  - Estimate (2021): 4,718 (−9.7%)
- Time zone: UTC+3 (MSK)
- Postal code: 368622
- Dialing code: +7 87240
- OKTMO ID: 82620488101

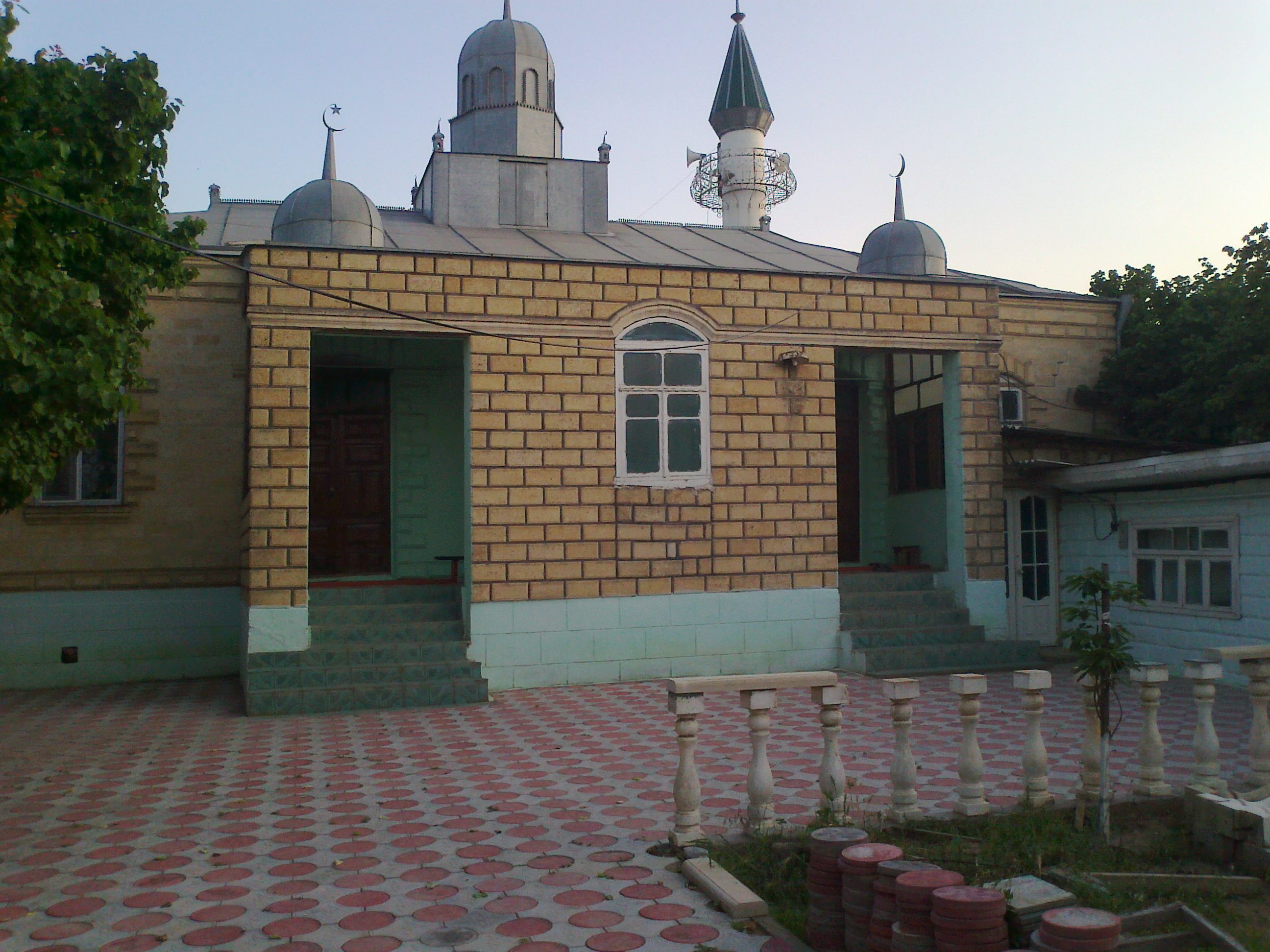
Chinar mosque

Chinar (Russian: Чинар; Lezgian: Чинар; Azerbaijani: Çinar) is a rural locality (a selo) in Derbentsky District of the Republic of Dagestan, located in the southeastern part of the republic, 107 kilometers (66 mi) from the republic's capital Makhachkala and 5 kilometers (3.1 mi) from Dagestanskiye Ogni, where the nearest railway station is. Population: 5,227 (2010 census); 4,357 (2002 census); 2,908 (1989 Soviet census)..

The ethnic composition of the population is mostly Lezgins, Azeris, Dargins.
