= Arablinskoye =

Arablinskoye Араблинское Әрәбләр
- Selo
- Location within Republic of Dagestan Location within Russia
- Coordinates: 41°57′N 48°19′E
- Country: Russia
- Region: Republic of Dagestan
- District: Derbentsky District
- Time zone: UTC+3:00

Arablinskoye (Russian: Араблинское; Azerbaijani: Әрәбләр, Ərəblər) is a rural locality (a selo) in Derbentsky District, Republic of Dagestan, Russia. The population was 2,174 as of 2010. There are 35 streets.

== Geography ==
Arablinskoye is located 11 km south of Derbent (the district's administrative centre) by road. Nizhny Dzhaglan and Avadan are the nearest rural localities.

== Nationalities ==
Lezgins, Azerbaijanis, Tabasarans, Aghuls and Dargins live there.

Prior to the 1970s, several Mountain Jewish families resided in Arablinskoye. During this period, these families emigrated to Israel.
