= Salik, Republic of Dagestan =

Salik Салик Сәлик
- Selo
- Location within Republic of Dagestan Location within Russia
- Coordinates: 42°10′N 48°05′E
- Country: Russia
- Region: Republic of Dagestan
- District: Derbentsky District
- Time zone: UTC+3:00

Salik (Russian: Салик; Azerbaijani: Сәлик, Səlik) is a rural locality (a selo) in Derbentsky District, Republic of Dagestan, Russia. The population was 1,763 as of 2010. There are 16 streets.

== Geography ==
Salik is located 22 km northwest of Derbent (the district's administrative centre) by road. Velikent and Kala are the nearest rural localities.

== Nationalities ==
Tabasarans, Azerbaijanis and Dargins live there.
