= Delichoban =

Delichoban Дәличобан Деличобан
- Selo
- Location within Republic of Dagestan Location within Russia
- Coordinates: 42°11′N 48°05′E
- Country: Russia
- Region: Republic of Dagestan
- District: Derbentsky District
- Time zone: UTC+3:00

Delichoban (Russian: Деличобан; Azerbaijani: Дәличобан, Dəliçoban) is a rural locality (a selo) in Derbentsky District, Republic of Dagestan, Russia. The population was 2,217 as of 2010. The village has an Azerbaijani-majority. There are 30 streets.

== Geography ==
Delichoban is located 26 km northwest of Derbent (the district's administrative centre) by road. Velikent and Padar are the nearest rural localities.
