= Dzhalgan =

Dzhalgan Джалган Жалгъан
- Selo
- Location within Republic of Dagestan Location within Russia
- Coordinates: 42°01′N 48°15′E
- Country: Russia
- Region: Republic of Dagestan
- District: Derbentsky District
- Time zone: UTC+3:00

Dzhalgan (Russian: Джалган; Tat: Жалгъан) is a rural locality (a selo) in Derbentsky District, Republic of Dagestan, Russia. The population was 725 as of 2010. There are 25 streets.

== Geography ==
Dzhalgan is located 19 km southwest of Derbent (the district's administrative center) by road. Derbent and Sabnova are the nearest rural localities.

== Nationalities ==
Azerbaijanis(actually Caucasus Persians known as Tats) live there.
