= Nizhny Dzhalgan =

Nizhny Dzhalgan Нижний Джалган Ашағы-Ҹалған
- Selo
- Location within Republic of Dagestan Location within Russia
- Coordinates: 41°59′N 48°19′E
- Country: Russia
- Region: Republic of Dagestan
- District: Derbentsky District
- Time zone: UTC+3:00

Nizhny Dzhalgan (Russian: Нижний Джалган; Azerbaijani: Ашағы-Ҹалған, Aşağı-Calğan) is a rural locality (a selo) in Khazarsky Selsoviet, Derbentsky District, Republic of Dagestan, Russia. The population was 2,841 as of 2010. There are 44 streets.

== Geography ==
Nizhny Dzhalgan is located 9 km south of Derbent (the district's administrative centre) by road. Vavilovo, Khazar and Arablinskoye are the nearest rural localities.

== Nationalities ==
Azerbaijanis and Tabasarans live there.
