= Bilgadi =

Bilgadi Билһәди Бильгади
- Selo
- Location within Republic of Dagestan Location within Russia
- Coordinates: 42°05′N 48°08′E
- Country: Russia
- Region: Republic of Dagestan
- District: Derbentsky District
- Time zone: UTC+3:00

Bilgadi (Russian: Бильгади; Azerbaijani: Билһәди, Bilhədi) is a rural locality (a selo) in Chinarsky Selsoviet, Derbentsky District, Republic of Dagestan, Russia. The population was 635 as of 2010. The village has an Azerbaijani-majority.

== Geography ==
Bilgadi is located 17 km northwest of Derbent (the district's administrative centre) by road. Chinar and Zidyan-Kazmalyar are the nearest rural localities.
