= Mitagi =

Mitagi Митаги Митәhи
- Selo
- Location within Republic of Dagestan Location within Russia
- Coordinates: 42°00′N 48°11′E
- Country: Russia
- Region: Republic of Dagestan
- District: Derbentsky District
- Time zone: UTC+3:00

Mitagi (Russian: Митаги; Azerbaijani: Митәhи, Mitəhi) is a rural locality (a selo) in Derbentsky District, Republic of Dagestan, Russia. The population was 651 as of 2010. There are 9 streets.

== Geography ==
Mitagi is located 19 km southwest of Derbent (the district's administrative centre) by road. Mitagi-Kazmalyar and Mugarty are the nearest rural localities.

== Nationalities ==
Azerbaijanis and Tats live there.
