= Tatlyar =

Tatlyar Татляр Татлар
- Selo
- Location within Republic of Dagestan Location within Russia
- Coordinates: 42°11′N 48°01′E
- Country: Russia
- Region: Republic of Dagestan
- District: Derbentsky District
- Time zone: UTC+3:00

Tatlyar (Russian: Татляр; Azerbaijani: Татлар, Tatlar) is a rural locality (a selo) and the administrative centre of Tatlyarsky Selsoviet, Derbentsky District, Republic of Dagestan, Russia. The population was 1,510 as of 2010. There are 30 streets.

== Geography ==
Tatlyar is located 29 km northwest of Derbent (the district's administrative centre) by road. Karadagly and Ullu-Terkeme are the nearest rural localities.

== Nationalities ==
Azerbaijanis and Dargins live there.
