= Kala, Derbentsky District, Republic of Dagestan =

Kala Кала Гала
- Selo
- Location within Republic of Dagestan Location within Russia
- Coordinates: 42°09′N 48°06′E
- Country: Russia
- Region: Republic of Dagestan
- District: Derbentsky District
- Time zone: UTC+3:00

Kala (Russian: Кала; Azerbaijani: Гала, Qala) is a rural locality (a selo) in Derbentsky District, Republic of Dagestan, Russia. The population was 1,752 as of 2010. There are 42 streets.

== Geography ==
Kala is located 157 km southwest of Derbent (the district's administrative centre) by road. Shinaz and Kina are the nearest rural localities.

== Nationalities ==
Azerbaijanis, Tabasarans and Dargins live there.
