= Mugarty =

Mugarty Мугарты Муғарты
- Selo
- Location within Republic of Dagestan Location within Russia
- Coordinates: 41°59′N 48°09′E
- Country: Russia
- Region: Republic of Dagestan
- District: Derbentsky District
- Time zone: UTC+3:00

Mugarty (Russian: Мугарты; Azerbaijani: Муғарты, Muğartı) is a rural locality (a selo) in Derbentsky District, Republic of Dagestan, Russia. The population was 1,614 as of 2010. There are 14 streets.

== Geography ==
Mugarty is located 32 km southwest of Derbent (the district's administrative centre) by road. Mitagi and Rukel are the nearest rural localities.

== Nationalities ==
Azerbaijanis live there.
