= Sabnova =

Sabnova Сабнова
- Selo
- Location within Republic of Dagestan Location within Russia
- Coordinates: 42°04′N 48°14′E
- Country: Russia
- Region: Republic of Dagestan
- District: Derbentsky District
- Time zone: UTC+3:00

Sabnova (Russian: Сабнова) is a rural locality (a selo) in Derbentsky District, Republic of Dagestan, Russia. The population was 3,820 as of 2010. There are 51 streets.

== Geography ==
Sabnova is located 4 km northwest of Derbent (the district's administrative centre) by road. Derbent is the nearest rural locality.

== Nationalities ==
Lezgins, Tabasarans and Dargins live there.
