= Zidyan-Kazmalyar =

Zidyan-Kazmalyar Зидьян-Казмаляр Зидјан-Газмалар
- Selo
- Location within Republic of Dagestan Location within Russia
- Coordinates: 42°04′N 48°09′E
- Country: Russia
- Region: Republic of Dagestan
- District: Derbentsky District
- Time zone: UTC+3:00

Zidyan-Kazmalyar (Russian: Зидьян-Казмаляр; Azerbaijani: Зидјан-Газмалар, Zidyan-Qazmalar) is a rural locality (a selo) and the administrative centre of Zidyan-Kazmalyarsky Selsoviet, Derbentsky District, Republic of Dagestan, Russia. The population was 978 as of 2010. There are 10 streets.

== Geography ==
Zidyan-Kazmalyar is located 15 km northwest of Derbent (the district's administrative centre) by road. Bilgadi and Chinar are the nearest rural localities.

== Nationalities ==
Azerbaijanis live there.
