= Gedzhukh =

Gedzhukh Ҝеҹух Геджух КӀечӀух
- Selo
- Location within Republic of Dagestan Location within Russia
- Coordinates: 42°07′N 48°03′E
- Country: Russia
- Region: Republic of Dagestan
- District: Derbentsky District
- Time zone: UTC+3:00

Gedzhukh (Russian: Геджух; Azerbaijani: Ҝеҹух, Gecux; Dargwa: КӀечӀух) is a rural locality (a selo) in Derbentsky District, Republic of Dagestan, Russia. The Village population was 6,829 as of 2010. The village has an Azerbaijani-majority. There are 41 streets.

== Geography ==
Gedzhukh is located 24 km northwest of Derbent (the district's administrative centre) by road. Kala and Mamedkala are the nearest rural localities.
