= Azadogly =

Azadogly Азадоглы Азадогъли
- Selo
- Location within Republic of Dagestan Location within Russia
- Coordinates: 41°49′N 48°26′E
- Country: Russia
- Region: Republic of Dagestan
- District: Magaramkentsky District
- Time zone: UTC+3:00

Azadogly (Russian: Азадоглы; Lezgian: Азадогъли) is a rural locality (a selo) in Magaramkentsky District, Republic of Dagestan, Russia. The population was 1,697 as of 2010. There are 28 streets.

== Geography ==
Azadogly is located 32 km northeast of Magaramkent (the district's administrative centre) by road. Kumuk and Nyugdi are the nearest rural localities.

== Nationalities ==
Lezgins live there.
