= Kheli =

Kheli Хели
- Selo
- Location within Republic of Dagestan Location within Russia
- Coordinates: 41°58′N 48°03′E
- Country: Russia
- Region: Republic of Dagestan
- District: Tabasaransky District
- Time zone: UTC+3:00

Kheli (Russian: Хели) is a rural locality (a selo) and the administrative centre of Kheli-Penzhinsky Selsoviet, Tabasaransky District, Republic of Dagestan, Russia. Population: 575 (2010 census); 511 (2002 census); 491 (1989 Soviet census).

== Geography ==
Kheli is located 13 km east of Khuchni (the district's administrative centre) by road.
