= Yekrag =

Yekrag Екраг
- Selo
- Location within Republic of Dagestan Location within Russia
- Coordinates: 41°58′N 48°02′E
- Country: Russia
- Region: Republic of Dagestan
- District: Tabasaransky District
- Time zone: UTC+3:00

Yekrag (Russian: Екраг; Azerbaijani: Екраг, Yekraq) is a rural locality (a selo) in Kheli-Penzhinsky Selsoviet, Tabasaransky District, Republic of Dagestan, Russia. Population: 155 (2010 census); 219 (2002 census); 120 (1989 Soviet census).

== Geography ==
Yekrag is located 12 km east of Khuchni (the district's administrative centre) by road. Pendzhi is the nearest rural locality.
