= Persidskoye =

Persidskoye Персидское Персидски
- Selo
- Location within Republic of Dagestan Location within Russia
- Coordinates: 43°53′N 46°53′E
- Country: Russia
- Region: Republic of Dagestan
- District: Kizlyarsky District
- Time zone: UTC+3:00

Persidskoye (Russian: Персидское; Azerbaijani: Персидски, Persidski) is a rural locality (a selo) in Bolshezadoyevsky Selsoviet, Kizlyarsky District, Republic of Dagestan, Russia. The population was 235 as of 2010. There are 3 streets.

== Geography ==
Persidskoye is located 20 km northeast of Kizlyar (the district's administrative centre) by road, on the left bank of the Stary Terk River. Bolshebredikhinskoye and Novogladovka are the nearest rural localities.

== Nationalities ==
Azerbaijanis live there.
