= Tsanak, Republic of Dagestan =

Tsanak Цанак Ҹанаг Цӏанак
- Selo
- Location within Republic of Dagestan Location within Russia
- Coordinates: 41°56′N 48°02′E
- Country: Russia
- Region: Republic of Dagestan
- District: Tabasaransky District
- Time zone: UTC+3:00

Tsanak (Russian: Цанак; Azerbaijani: Ҹанаг, Canaq; Tabassaran: Цӏанак) is a rural locality (a selo) in Arkitsky Selsoviet, Tabasaransky District, Republic of Dagestan, Russia. Population: 906 (2010 census); 903 (2002 census); 714 (1989 Soviet census).

== Geography ==
Tsanak is located 13 km east of Khuchni (the district's administrative centre) by road. Arkit is the nearest rural locality.
