= Yersi =

Yersi Ерси
- Selo
- Location within Republic of Dagestan Location within Russia
- Coordinates: 42°00′N 48°01′E
- Country: Russia
- Region: Republic of Dagestan
- District: Tabasaransky District
- Time zone: UTC+3:00

Yersi (Russian: Ерси) is a rural locality (a selo) and the administrative center of Yersinsky Selsoviet, Tabasaransky District, Republic of Dagestan, Russia. Population: 1,087 (2010 census); 2,298 (2002 census); 1,714 (1989 Soviet census). There are 10 streets.

== Geography ==
Yersi is located 13 km northeast of Khuchni (the district's administrative centre) by road. Zil and Darvag are the nearest rural localities.
