= Kurush, Khasavyurtovsky District, Republic of Dagestan =

Kurush Куруш Цӏийи Къуруш
- Selo
- Location within Republic of Dagestan Location within Russia
- Coordinates: 43°23′N 46°45′E
- Country: Russia
- Region: Republic of Dagestan
- District: Khasavyurtovsky District
- Time zone: UTC+3:00

Kurush (Russian: Куруш; Lezgian: Цӏийи Къуруш) is a rural locality (a selo) in Khasavyurtovsky District, Republic of Dagestan, Russia. 7,090 (2021 census); 7,292 (2002 census); there are 133 streets.

== Geography ==
Kurush is located 24 km northeast of Khasavyurt (the district's administrative centre) by road. Kazmaaul is the nearest rural locality.
