= Darvag =

Darvag Дарваг Дәрваг
- Selo
- Location within Republic of Dagestan Location within Russia
- Coordinates: 42°01′N 48°03′E
- Country: Russia
- Region: Republic of Dagestan
- District: Tabasaransky District
- Time zone: UTC+3:00

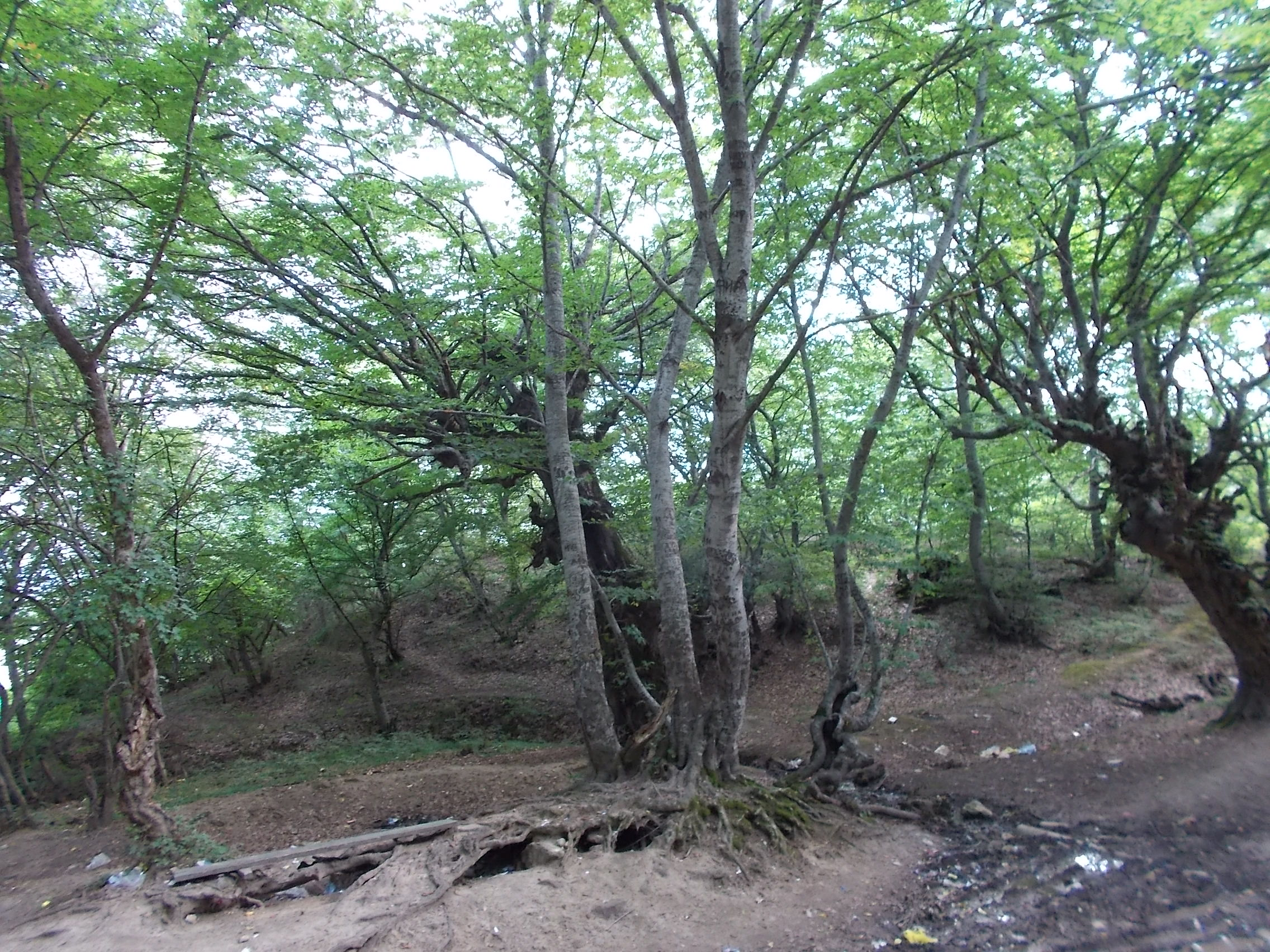
Sacred spring, Republic of Dagestan, Dagestanskie Ogni, Darvag village

Darvag (Russian: Дарваг; Azerbaijani: Дәрваг, Dərvaq) is a rural locality (a selo) in Tabasaransky District, Republic of Dagestan, Russia. Population: 2,891 (2021 census); 2,684 (2002 census); 2,124 (1989 Soviet census). There are 6 streets.

== Geography ==
Darvag is located 18 km northeast of Khuchni (the district's administrative centre) by road. Yersi is the nearest rural locality.
