= Belidzhi =

Belidzhi Белиджи
- Urban-type settlement

Other transcription(s)
  - Lezgian: Билиж
  - Azerbaijani: Белиджи, Belici, بەلیجی
- Interactive map of Belidzhi
- Location of Belidzhi Belidzhi (Republic of Dagestan)
- Coordinates: 41°52′10″N 48°23′25″E
- Country: Russia
- Federal subject: Dagestan
- Administrative district: Derbentsky District
- SettlementSelsoviet: Belidzhi Settlement
- Founded: 1899
- Urban-type settlement status since: 1965

Population (2010 Census)
  - Total: 12,236
  - Estimate (2025): 11,843 (−3.2%)

Administrative status
  - Capital of: Belidzhi Settlement

Municipal status
  - Municipal district: Derbentsky Municipal District
  - Urban settlement: Belidzhi Urban Settlement
  - Capital of: Belidzhi Urban Settlement
- Time zone: UTC+3 (MSK)
- Postal code: 368615
- OKTMO ID: 82620155051

Belidzhi population
- 2010 Census: 12,236
- 2002 Census: 11,584
- 1989 Census: 10,835
- 1979 Census: 10,041

Belidzhi (Russian: Белиджи́; Lezgian: Билиж; Azerbaijani: Белиджи, Belici) is an urban locality (an urban-type settlement) in Derbentsky District of the Republic of Dagestan, Russia. As of the 2010 Census, its population was 12,236.

== History ==
It was established in 1899. Urban-type settlement status was granted to it in 1965.

== Administrative and municipal status ==
Within the framework of administrative divisions, the urban-type settlement of Belidzhi is incorporated within Derbentsky District as Belidzhi Settlement (an administrative division of the district). As a municipal division, Belidzhi Settlement is incorporated within Derbentsky Municipal District as Belidzhi Urban Settlement.
