= Nizhny Katrukh =

Nizhny Katrukh Нижний Катрух Ашағы Гатрух
- Selo
- Location within Republic of Dagestan Location within Russia
- Coordinates: 41°44′N 47°12′E
- Country: Russia
- Region: Republic of Dagestan
- District: Rutulsky District
- Time zone: UTC+3:00

Nizhny Katrukh (Russian: Нижний Катрух; Azerbaijani: Ашағы Гатрух, Aşağı Qatrux) is a rural locality (a selo) in Rutulsky District, Republic of Dagestan, Russia. Population: 481 (2021 census); 710 (2002 census); 683 (1989 Soviet census). There are 4 streets.

== Geography ==
Nizhny Katrukh is located on the Samur ridge, near the Khirivalyu river, 35 km northwest of Rutul (the district's administrative centre) by road. Verkhny Katrukh and Arakul are the nearest rural localities.

== Nationalities ==
Azerbaijanis live there.
