= Mollakent, Republic of Dagestan =

Mollakent Моллакент ЦIийи Кутул
- Selo
- Location within Republic of Dagestan Location within Russia
- Coordinates: 41°55′N 48°22′E
- Country: Russia
- Region: Republic of Dagestan
- District: Kurakhsky District
- Time zone: UTC+3:00

Mollakent (Russian: Моллакент; Lezgian: ЦIийи Кутул) is a rural locality (a selo) and the administrative centre of Mollakentsky Selsoviet, Kurakhsky District, Republic of Dagestan, Russia. The population was 1,022 as of 2010. There are 25 streets.

== Geography ==
Mollakent is located 158 km north of Kurakh (the district's administrative centre) by road. Madzhalis and Urkarakh are the nearest rural localities.

== Nationalities ==
Lezgins live there.
