= Varsit =

Varsit Варсит ВарситӀ
- Selo
- Location within Republic of Dagestan Location within Russia
- Coordinates: 41°59′N 47°49′E
- Country: Russia
- Region: Republic of Dagestan
- District: Kaytagsky District
- Time zone: UTC+3:00

Varsit (Russian: Варсит; Kaitag and Dargwa: ВарситӀ) is a rural locality (a selo) and the administrative centre of Varsitsky Selsoviet, Kaytagsky District, Republic of Dagestan, Russia. The population was 245 as of 2010. There are two streets.

== Geography ==
Varsit is located 24 km south of Madzhalis (the district's administrative centre) by road. Surkhavkent and Shuragat are the nearest rural localities.

== Nationalities ==
Dargins live there.
