= Temiraul =

Temiraul Темираул Темиравул
- Selo
- Location within Republic of Dagestan Location within Russia
- Coordinates: 43°15′N 46°49′E
- Country: Russia
- Region: Republic of Dagestan
- District: Khasavyurtovsky District
- Time zone: UTC+3:00

Temiraul (Russian: Темираул; Kumyk: Темиравул, Temiravul) is a rural locality (a selo) and the administrative centre of Temiraulsky Selsoviet, Khasavyurtovsky District, Republic of Dagestan, Russia. Population: 4,213 (2021 census); 3,111 (2002 census); 2,386 (1989 Soviet census). There are 47 streets.

== Geography ==
Temiraul is located 31 km east of Khasavyurt (the district's administrative centre) by road. Kirovaul is the nearest rural locality.
