= Arablyar, Republic of Dagestan =

Arablyar Арабляр ЦIийи Ахнигъ
- Selo
- Location within Republic of Dagestan Location within Russia
- Coordinates: 41°55′N 48°22′E
- Country: Russia
- Region: Republic of Dagestan
- District: Kurakhsky District
- Time zone: UTC+3:00

Arablyar (Russian: Арабляр; Lezgian: ЦIии Ахнигъ, Tsiyi Akhnig) is a rural locality (a selo) in Mollakentsky Selsoviet, Kurakhsky District, Republic of Dagestan, Russia. The population was 514 as of 2010. There are 20 streets.

== Geography ==
Arablyar is located 88 km northeast of Kurakh (the district's administrative centre) by road. Mollakent and Avadan are the nearest rural localities.

== Nationalities ==
Lezgins Sunni Muslims live there.
