= Qayakənd =

- Municipality
- Location within Azerbaijan
- Coordinates: 41°24′N 48°25′E
- Country: Azerbaijan
- Rayon: Qusar

Population
  - Total: 460
- Time zone: UTC+4 (AZT)
  - Summer (DST): UTC+5 (AZT)

Qayakənd (also, Kayakend) is a village and municipality in the Qusar Rayon of Azerbaijan. It has a population of 460.
