= Mamedkala =

Mamedkala Мамедкала
- Urban-type settlement

Other transcription(s)
  - Dargwa and Lezgian: Мамедкъала
  - Azerbaijani: Маммәдкала
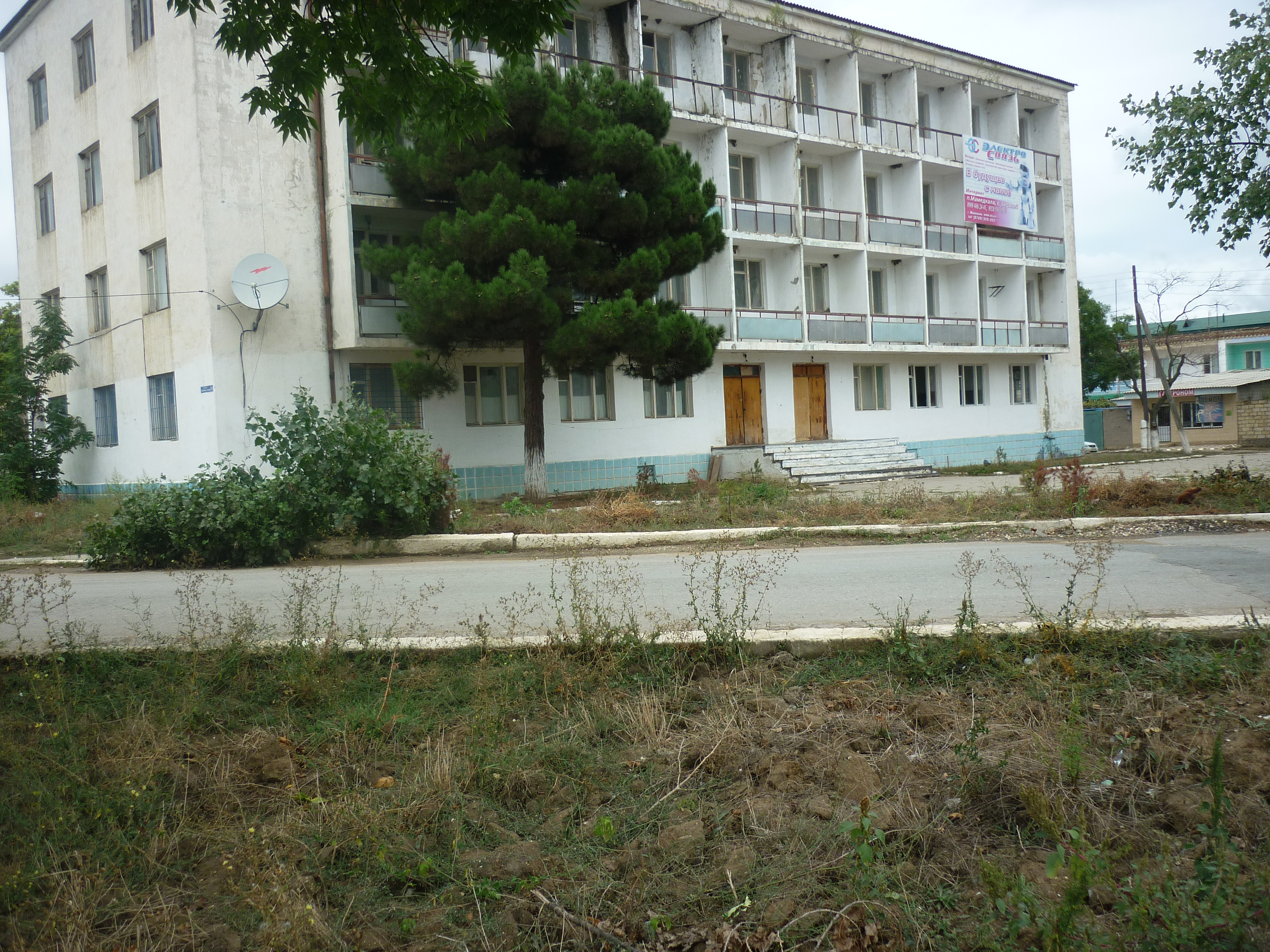
- In Mamedkala
- Interactive map of Mamedkala
- Location of Mamedkala Mamedkala (Republic of Dagestan)
- Coordinates: 42°10′N 48°07′E
- Country: Russia
- Federal subject: Dagestan
- Administrative district: Derbentsky District
- SettlementSelsoviet: Mamedkala Settlement

Population (2010 Census)
  - Total: 11,029
  - Estimate (2025): 10,962 (−0.6%)

Administrative status
  - Capital of: Mamedkala Settlement

Municipal status
  - Municipal district: Derbentsky Municipal District
  - Urban settlement: Mamedkala Urban Settlement
  - Capital of: Mamedkala Urban Settlement
- Time zone: UTC+3 (MSK)
- Postal code: 368621
- OKTMO ID: 82620162051

Mamedkala population
- 2010 Census: 11,029
- 2002 Census: 8,374
- 1989 Census: 6,000
- 1979 Census: 5,928

Mamedkala (Russian: Мамедкала́; Lezgian: Мамедкъала; Azerbaijani: Маммәдкала, Mammәdkala) is an urban locality (an urban-type settlement) in Derbentsky District of the Republic of Dagestan, Russia. As of the 2010 Census, its population was 11,029.

== Administrative and municipal status ==
Within the framework of administrative divisions, the urban-type settlement of Mamedkala is incorporated within Derbentsky District as Mamedkala Settlement (an administrative division of the district). As a municipal division, Mamedkala Settlement is incorporated within Derbentsky Municipal District as Mamedkala Urban Settlement.
