= Arakul, Republic of Dagestan =

Arakul Аракул
- Selo
- Location within Republic of Dagestan Location within Russia
- Coordinates: 41°46′N 47°12′E
- Country: Russia
- Region: Republic of Dagestan
- District: Rutulsky District
- Time zone: UTC+3:00

Arakul (Russian: Аракул) is a rural locality (a selo) in Rutulsky District, Republic of Dagestan, Russia. Population: 386 (2021 census); 462 (2002 census); 451 (1989 Soviet census). There are 2 streets.

== Geography ==
Arakul is located 38 km northwest of Rutul (the district's administrative centre) by road. Verkhny Katrukh and Nizhny Katrukh are the nearest rural localities.

== Nationalities ==
Laks live there.
