= Tsirkhe =

Tsirkhe Цирхе Зирхе, Цӏерхьеъ, Цӏирхье
- Selo
- Location within Republic of Dagestan Location within Russia
- Coordinates: 41°54′N 47°35′E
- Country: Russia
- Region: Republic of Dagestan
- District: Agulsky District
- Time zone: UTC+3:00

Tsirkhe (Russian: Цирхе; Aghul: Зирхе, Цӏерхьеъ, Цӏирхье) is a rural locality (a selo) in Amukhsky Selsoviet, Agulsky District, Republic of Dagestan, Russia. The population was 10 as of 2010.

== Geography ==
Tsirkhe is located on the Tsirkharukh River, 26 km north of Tpig (the district's administrative centre) by road. Amukh is the nearest rural locality.
