= Pendzhi =

Pendzhi Пенджи Пәнҹеһ
- Selo
- Location within Republic of Dagestan Location within Russia
- Coordinates: 41°57′N 48°03′E
- Country: Russia
- Region: Republic of Dagestan
- District: Tabasaransky District
- Time zone: UTC+3:00

Pendzhi (Russian: Пенджи; Azerbaijani: Пәнҹеһ, Pənceh) is a rural locality (a selo) in Kheli-Penzhinsky Selsoviet, Tabasaransky District, Republic of Dagestan, Russia. Population: 314 (2010 census); 303 (2002 census); 248 (1989 Soviet census).

== Geography ==
Pendzhi is located 12 km east of Khuchni (the district's administrative centre) by road. Yekrag is the nearest rural locality.
