= Khyuryak =

Khyuryak Хюряк Хюряхъ
- Selo
- Location within Republic of Dagestan Location within Russia
- Coordinates: 41°52′N 48°04′E
- Country: Russia
- Region: Republic of Dagestan
- District: Tabasaransky District
- Time zone: UTC+3:00

Khyuryak (Russian: Хюряк; Tabassaran: Хюряхъ) is a rural locality (a selo) in Burgankentsky Selsoviet, Tabasaransky District, Republic of Dagestan, Russia. Population: 420 (2010 census); 460 (2002 census); 300 (1989 Soviet census). There are 5 streets.

== Geography ==
Khyuryak is located 22 km southeast of Khuchni (the district's administrative centre) by road. Burgankent is the nearest rural locality.
