= Kullar, Republic of Dagestan =

Kullar Куллар ЛукIар Гуллар
- Selo
- Location within Republic of Dagestan Location within Russia
- Coordinates: 41°50′N 48°23′E
- Country: Russia
- Region: Republic of Dagestan
- District: Derbentsky District
- Time zone: UTC+3:00

Kullar (Russian: Куллар; Lezgian: ЛукIар; Azerbaijani: Гуллар, Qullar) is a rural locality (a selo) in Derbentsky District, Republic of Dagestan, Russia. The population was 2,313 as of 2010. There are 59 streets.

== Geography ==
Kullar is located 28 km south of Derbent (the district's administrative centre) by road. Kartas-Kazmalyar and Kumuk are the nearest rural localities.

== Nationalities ==
Lezgins, Tabasarans and Azerbaijanis live there.
