= Dagestanskiye Ogni =

Town in the Republic of Dagestan, Russia

Dagestanskiye Ogni Дагестанские Огни
- Town
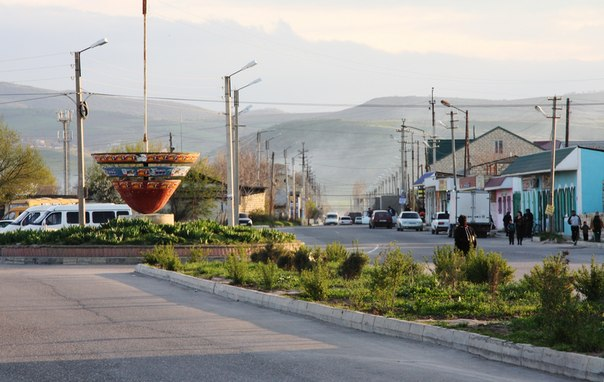
- View of Dagestanskiye Ogni

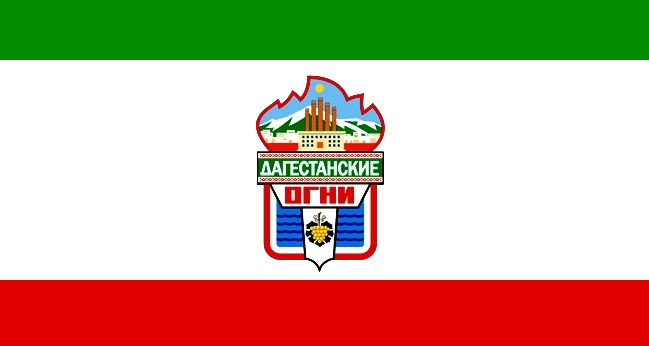
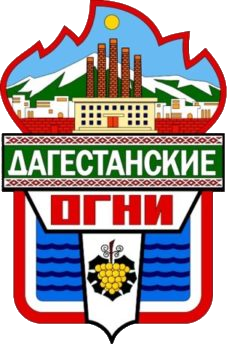
- Flag Coat of arms
- Interactive map of Dagestanskiye Ogni
- Location of Dagestanskiye Ogni Dagestanskiye Ogni (Republic of Dagestan)
- Coordinates: 42°07′N 48°11′E
- Country: Russia
- Federal subject: Dagestan
- Founded: 1914
- Elevation: 35 m (115 ft)

Population (2010 Census)
  - Total: 27,923
  - Estimate (2021): 31,412 (+12.5%)

Administrative status
  - Subordinated to: Town of Dagestanskiye Ogni
  - Capital of: Town of Dagestanskiye Ogni

Municipal status
  - Urban okrug: Dagestanskiye Ogni Urban Okrug
  - Capital of: Dagestanskiye Ogni Urban Okrug
- Time zone: UTC+3 (MSK)
- Postal code: 368670
- OKTMO ID: 82708000001

Dagestanskiye Ogni (Russian: Дагестанские Огни [dəgʲɪˈstanskɪɪ ɐˈgnʲi]; Tabassaran: Дагъустнан ЦIаяр; Azerbaijani: Дағыстан Ишыглары, Dağıstan İşıqları; Lezgian: Дагъустандин ЦӀаяр) is a town in the Republic of Dagestan, Russia, located on the coast of the Caspian Sea, 120 kilometers (75 mi) south of Makhachkala. Population: 31,412 (2021 census); 27,923 (2010 census); 26,346 (2002 census); 21,676 (1989 Soviet census).

== Administrative and municipal status ==
Within the framework of administrative divisions, it is incorporated as the Town of Dagestanskiye Ogni—an administrative unit with the status equal to that of the districts. As a municipal division, the Town of Dagestanskiye Ogni is incorporated as Dagestanskiye Ogni Urban Okrug.

== Demographics ==
Historical population
Year	Pop.	±%
1926	1,048	—
1939	3,770	+259.7%
1959	6,814	+80.7%
1970	10,444	+53.3%
1979	12,598	+20.6%
1989	21,676	+72.1%
2002	26,346	+21.5%
2010	27,923	+6.0%
2021	31,412	+12.5%
Source: Census data

Ethnic groups (2021 census):

- Tabasarans (51.2%)
- Azerbaijani (18.0%)
- Lezgins (15.9%)
- Dargins (6.5%)
- Aghuls (3.0%)
- Russians (1.2%)

== Climate ==
Dagestanskiye Ogni has a cold semi-arid climate (Köppen climate classification: BSk).

Climate data for Dagestanskiye Ogni
Month	Jan	Feb	Mar	Apr	May	Jun	Jul	Aug	Sep	Oct	Nov	Dec	Year
Mean daily maximum °C (°F)	4.5 (40.1)	4.9 (40.8)	7.9 (46.2)	14.2 (57.6)	20.5 (68.9)	26.2 (79.2)	29.3 (84.7)	28.7 (83.7)	24.4 (75.9)	18.4 (65.1)	11.7 (53.1)	7.3 (45.1)	16.5 (61.7)
Daily mean °C (°F)	1.1 (34.0)	1.7 (35.1)	4.5 (40.1)	9.8 (49.6)	16.2 (61.2)	21.6 (70.9)	24.8 (76.6)	24.6 (76.3)	20.1 (68.2)	14.5 (58.1)	8.4 (47.1)	4.1 (39.4)	12.6 (54.7)
Mean daily minimum °C (°F)	−2.3 (27.9)	−1.4 (29.5)	1.1 (34.0)	5.4 (41.7)	11.9 (53.4)	17.0 (62.6)	20.3 (68.5)	20.5 (68.9)	15.8 (60.4)	10.6 (51.1)	5.1 (41.2)	0.9 (33.6)	8.7 (47.7)
Average precipitation mm (inches)	25 (1.0)	34 (1.3)	24 (0.9)	23 (0.9)	31 (1.2)	22 (0.9)	24 (0.9)	24 (0.9)	43 (1.7)	51 (2.0)	35 (1.4)	37 (1.5)	373 (14.6)
Source: Climate-Data.org
