= Maraga, Republic of Dagestan =

Maraga Марага Мараға
- Selo
- Location within Republic of Dagestan Location within Russia
- Coordinates: 41°57′N 48°07′E
- Country: Russia
- Region: Republic of Dagestan
- District: Tabasaransky District
- Time zone: UTC+3:00

Maraga (Russian: Марага; Azerbaijani: Мараға, Marağa) is a rural locality (a selo) and the administrative centre of Maraginsky Selsoviet, Tabasaransky District, Republic of Dagestan, Russia. Population: 1,791 (2010 census); 1,383 (2002 census); 1,413 (1989 Soviet census). There are three streets.

== Geography ==
Maraga is located 22 kilometres (14 mi) east of Khuchni (the district's administrative centre) by road. Gelinbatan is the nearest rural locality.
