= Chontaul =

Chontaul Чонтаул Чантросу Чонтавул Чонт-Эвл
- Selo
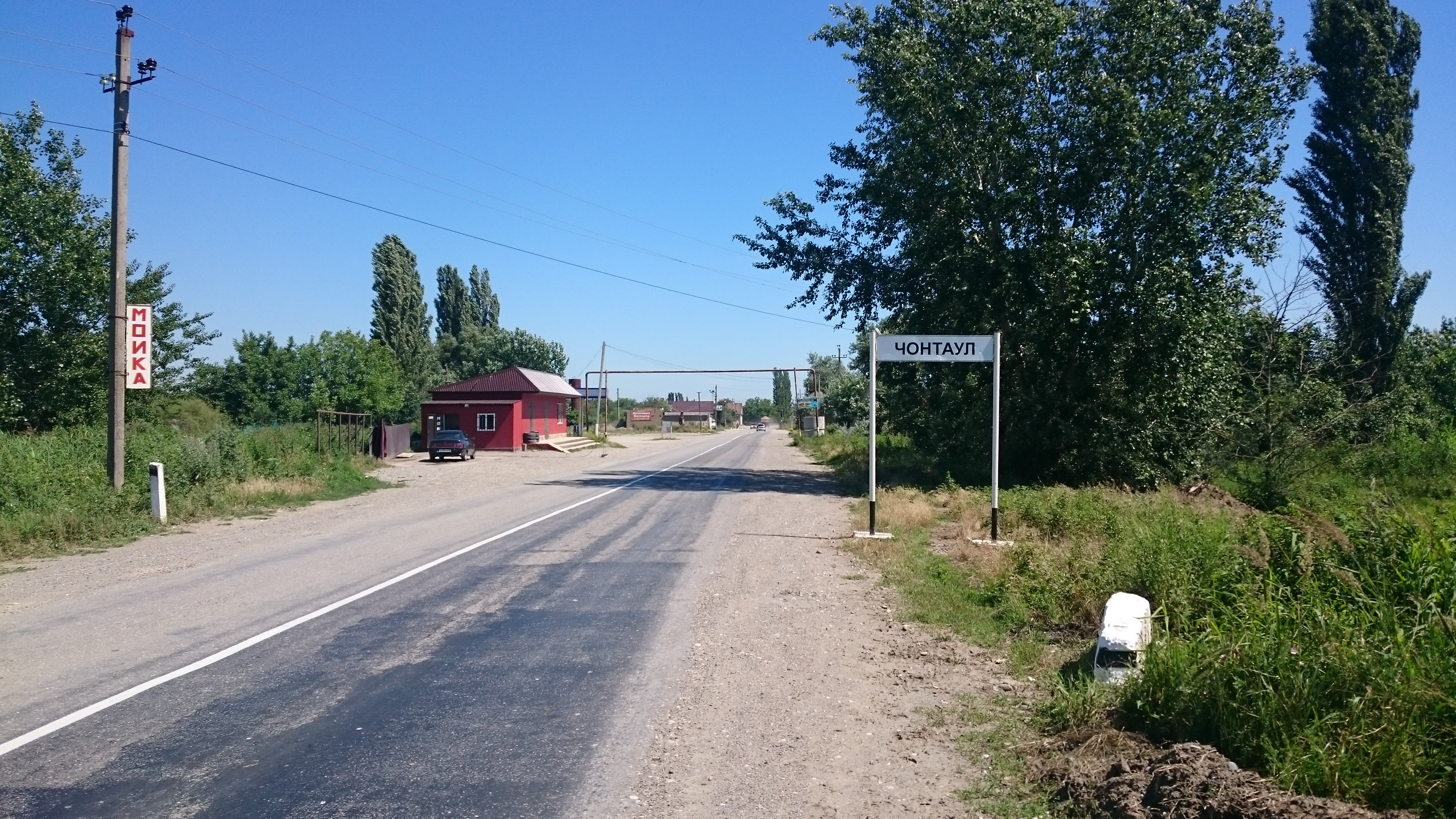
- Entrance to Chontaul

- Location within Republic of Dagestan Location within Russia
- Coordinates: 43°18′N 46°51′E
- Country: Russia
- Region: Republic of Dagestan
- District: Kizilyurtovsky District
- Time zone: UTC+3:00

Chontaul (Russian: Чонтаул; Avar: Чантросу; Kumyk: Чонтавул, Çontavul; Chechen: Чонт-Эвл, Çont-Evl) is a rural locality (a selo) in Kizilyurtovsky District, Republic of Dagestan, Russia. The population was 7,023 as of 2010. There are 63 streets.

== Geography ==
Chontaul is located on the left bank of the Sulak River, 87 km south of Kizlyar (the district's administrative centre) by road. Kostek and Novy Kostek are the nearest rural localities.

== Nationalities ==
Kumyks, Avars and Chechens live there.
