= Derbentsky District =

Derbentsky District Дербентский район (Russian)
- District

Other transcription(s)
  - Azerbaijani: Дәрбәнд раjонy
  - Lezgian and Tabasaran: Дербент район
  - Dargwa: Чулли къотт
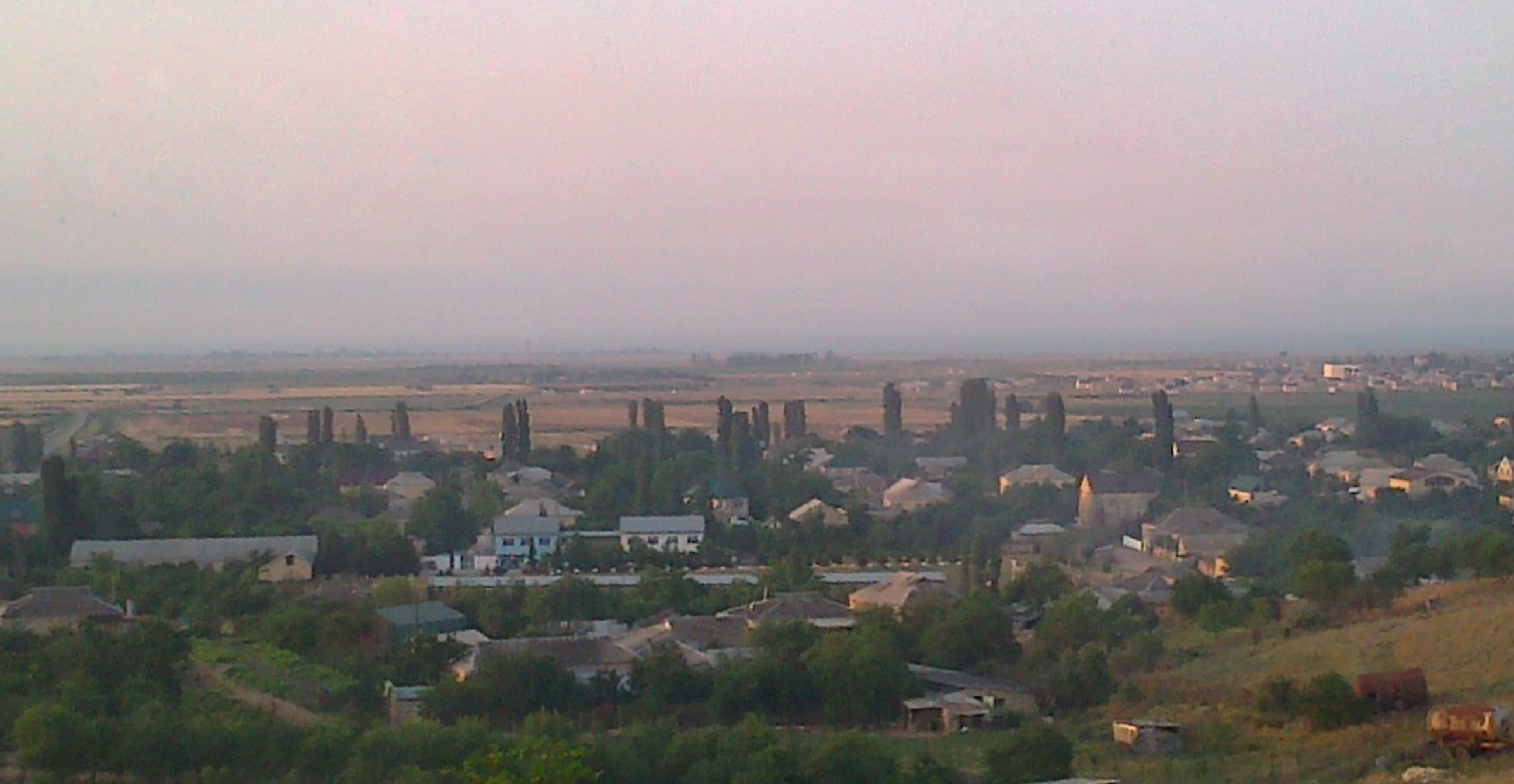
- The selo of Chinar in Derbentsky District

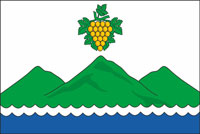
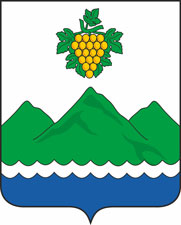
- Flag Coat of arms
- Location of Derbentsky District in the Republic of Dagestan
- Coordinates: 42°04′N 48°18′E
- Country: Russia
- Federal subject: Republic of Dagestan
- Established: 1921
- Administrative center: Derbent

Area
  - Total: 822.72 km^{2} (317.65 sq mi)

Population (2010 Census)
  - Total: 99,054
  - Density: 120.40/km^{2} (311.83/sq mi)
  - Urban: 23.5%
  - Rural: 76.5%

Administrative structure
  - Administrative divisions: 2 Settlements, 7 Selsoviets
  - Inhabited localities: 2 urban-type settlements, 38 rural localities

Municipal structure
  - Municipally incorporated as: Derbentsky Municipal District
  - Municipal divisions: 2 urban settlements, 27 rural settlements
- Time zone: UTC+3 (MSK)
- OKTMO ID: 82620000
- Website: http://derbrayon.ru

Population of Derbentsky District
- 2010 Census: 99,054
- 2002 Census: 86,494
- 1989 Census: 63,575
- 1979 Census: 60,502

Derbentsky District (Russian: Дербе́нтский райо́н; Lezgian: Дербент район; Azerbaijani: Дәрбәнд раjонy, romanized: Dərbənd rayonu) is an administrative and municipal district (raion), one of the forty-one in the Republic of Dagestan, Russia. It is located in the southeast of the republic. The area of the district is 822.72 square kilometers (317.65 sq mi). Its administrative center is the city of Derbent (which is not administratively a part of the district). As of the 2010 Census, the total population of the district was 99,054.

== Administrative and municipal status ==
Within the framework of administrative divisions, Derbentsky District is one of the forty-one in the republic. It is divided into two settlements (administrative divisions with the administrative centers in the urban-type settlements (inhabited localities) of Belidzhi and Mamedkala) and seven selsoviets, which comprise thirty-eight rural localities. The city of Derbent serves as its administrative center, despite being incorporated separately as an administrative unit with the status equal to that of the districts.

As a municipal division, the district is incorporated as Derbentsky Municipal District. The settlements are incorporated as urban settlements, and the seven selsoviets are incorporated as twenty-seven rural settlements within the municipal district. The City of Derbent is incorporated separately from the district as Derbent Urban Okrug, but serves as the administrative center of the municipal district as well.

== Demographics ==
As of the 2010 Census, the main ethnic groups are:

- Azerbaijani (58.02%)
- Lezgins (18.8%)
- Tabasarans (9.9%)
- Dargins (7.9%)
- Aghuls (2.2%)
- Russians (0.5%)
