= Batashyurt =

Batashyurt Баташюрт Баташ-юрт
- Selo
- Location within Republic of Dagestan Location within Russia
- Coordinates: 43°18′N 46°30′E
- Country: Russia
- Region: Republic of Dagestan
- District: Khasavyurtovsky District
- Time zone: UTC+3:00

Batashyurt (Russian: Баташюрт; Kumyk: Баташ-юрт, Bataş-yurt) is a rural locality (a selo) in Khasavyurtovsky District, Republic of Dagestan, Russia. 4,268 (2021 census); 3,536 (2002 census); 2,248 (1989 Soviet census). There are 47 streets.

== Geography ==
Batashyurt is located 11 km northwest of Khasavyurt (the district's administrative centre) by road. Osmanyurt is the nearest rural locality.
