= Bayramaul =

Bayramaul Байрамаул Байрам-Эвл Байрамавул
- Selo
- Location within Republic of Dagestan Location within Russia
- Coordinates: 43°17′N 46°43′E
- Country: Russia
- Region: Republic of Dagestan
- District: Khasavyurtovsky District
- Time zone: UTC+3:00

Bayramaul (Russian: Байрамаул; Chechen: Байрам-Эвл, Bayram-Evl; Kumyk: Байрамавул, Bayramavul) is a rural locality (a selo) and the administrative centre of Bayramaulsky Selsoviet, Khasavyurtovsky District, Republic of Dagestan, Russia. Population: 3,666 (2021 census); 2,861 (2002 census); 2,304 (1989 Soviet census). There are 37 streets.

== Geography ==
Bayramaul is located 19 km northeast of Khasavyurt (the district's administrative centre) by road. Mutsalaul is the nearest rural locality.
