= Goksuv =

Goksuv Гоксув Гёксув-отар
- Selo
- Location within Republic of Dagestan Location within Russia
- Coordinates: 43°13′N 46°49′E
- Country: Russia
- Region: Republic of Dagestan
- District: Khasavyurtovsky District
- Time zone: UTC+3:00

Goksuv (Russian: Гоксув; Kumyk: Гёксув-отар, Göksuv-otar) is a rural locality (a selo) in Temiraulsky Selsoviet, Khasavyurtovsky District, Republic of Dagestan, Russia. Population: 859 (2021 census); 750 (2002 census); 482 (1989 Soviet census). There are 11 streets.

== Geography ==
Goksuv is located 27 km east of Khasavyurt (the district's administrative centre) by road. Novy Sulak is the nearest rural locality.
