= Terechnoye =

Terechnoye Теречное
- Selo
- Location within Republic of Dagestan Location within Russia
- Coordinates: 43°26′N 46°23′E
- Country: Russia
- Region: Republic of Dagestan
- District: Khasavyurtovsky District
- Time zone: UTC+3:00

Terechnoye (Russian: Теречное) is a rural locality (a selo) in Khasavyurtovsky District, Republic of Dagestan, Russia. Population: 1,627 (2021 census); 1,617 (2002 census); 1,230 (1989 Soviet census). There are 13 streets.

== Geography ==
Terechnoye is located 29 km northwest of Khasavyurt (the district's administrative centre) by road. Kemsiyurt is the nearest rural locality.
