= Genzheaul =

Genzheaul Генжеаул Генжеавул Генж-Эвл
- Selo
- Location within Republic of Dagestan Location within Russia
- Coordinates: 43°17′N 46°45′E
- Country: Russia
- Region: Republic of Dagestan
- District: Khasavyurtovsky District
- Time zone: UTC+3:00

Genzheaul (Russian: Генжеаул; Kumyk: Генжеавул, Genjeavul; Chechen: Генж-Эвл, Genƶ-Evl) is a rural locality (a selo) in Bayramaulsky Selsoviet, Khasavyurtovsky District, Republic of Dagestan, Russia. Population: 629 (2021 census); 553 (2002 census); 547 (1989 Soviet census). There are 9 streets.

== Geography ==
Genzheaul is located 22 km northeast of Khasavyurt (the district's administrative centre) by road. Bayramaul is the nearest rural locality.
