= Kazmaaul =

Kazmaaul Казмааул Къазмаавул
- Selo
- Location within Republic of Dagestan Location within Russia
- Coordinates: 43°25′N 46°45′E
- Country: Russia
- Region: Republic of Dagestan
- District: Khasavyurtovsky District
- Time zone: UTC+3:00

Kazmaaul (Russian: Казмааул; Kumyk: Къазмаавул, Qazmaavul) is a rural locality (a selo) and the administrative centre of Kazmaaulsky Selsoviet, Khasavyurtovsky District, Republic of Dagestan, Russia. 1,336 (2010 census); 1,321 (2002 census); 1,056 (1989 Soviet census). There are 31 streets.

== Geography ==
Kazmaaul is located 29 km northeast of Khasavyurt (the district's administrative centre) by road. Arkhida is the nearest rural locality.
