= Laklakyurt =

Laklakyurt Лаклакюрт Лакълакъ-юрт
- Selo
- Location within Republic of Dagestan Location within Russia
- Coordinates: 43°18′N 46°48′E
- Country: Russia
- Region: Republic of Dagestan
- District: Khasavyurtovsky District
- Time zone: UTC+3:00

Laklakyurt (Russian: Лаклакюрт; Kumyk: Лакълакъ-юрт, Laqlaq-yurt) is a rural locality (a selo) in Kosteksky Selsoviet, Khasavyurtovsky District, Republic of Dagestan, Russia. 752 (2010 census); 92 (2002 census); 111 (1989 Soviet census). There are 3 streets.

== Geography ==
By road, Laklakyurt is located 29 km northeast of Khasavyurt (the district's administrative centre). Novy Kostek is the nearest rural locality.
