= Karlanyurt =

Karlanyurt Карланюрт Къарлан-юрт ГӀан-Йурт
- Selo
- Location within Republic of Dagestan Location within Russia
- Coordinates: 43°13′N 46°38′E
- Country: Russia
- Region: Republic of Dagestan
- District: Khasavyurtovsky District
- Time zone: UTC+3:00

Karlanyurt (Russian: Карланюрт; Kumyk: Къарлан-юрт, Qarlan-yurt; Chechen: ГӀан-Йурт, Ġan-Yurt) is a rural locality (a selo) and the administrative centre of Karlanyurtovsky Selsoviet, Khasavyurtovsky District, Republic of Dagestan, Russia. 3,957 (2021 census); 2,911 (2002 census); 1,787 (1989 Soviet census). There are 18 streets.

== Geography ==
Karlanyurt is located 11 km southeast of Khasavyurt (the district's administrative centre) by road. Petrakovskoye is the nearest rural locality.
