= Adzhimazhagatyurt =

Adzhimazhagatyurt Аджимажагатюрт Ажимажагьатюрт Хьаьж-МӀаьж-Йурт
- Selo
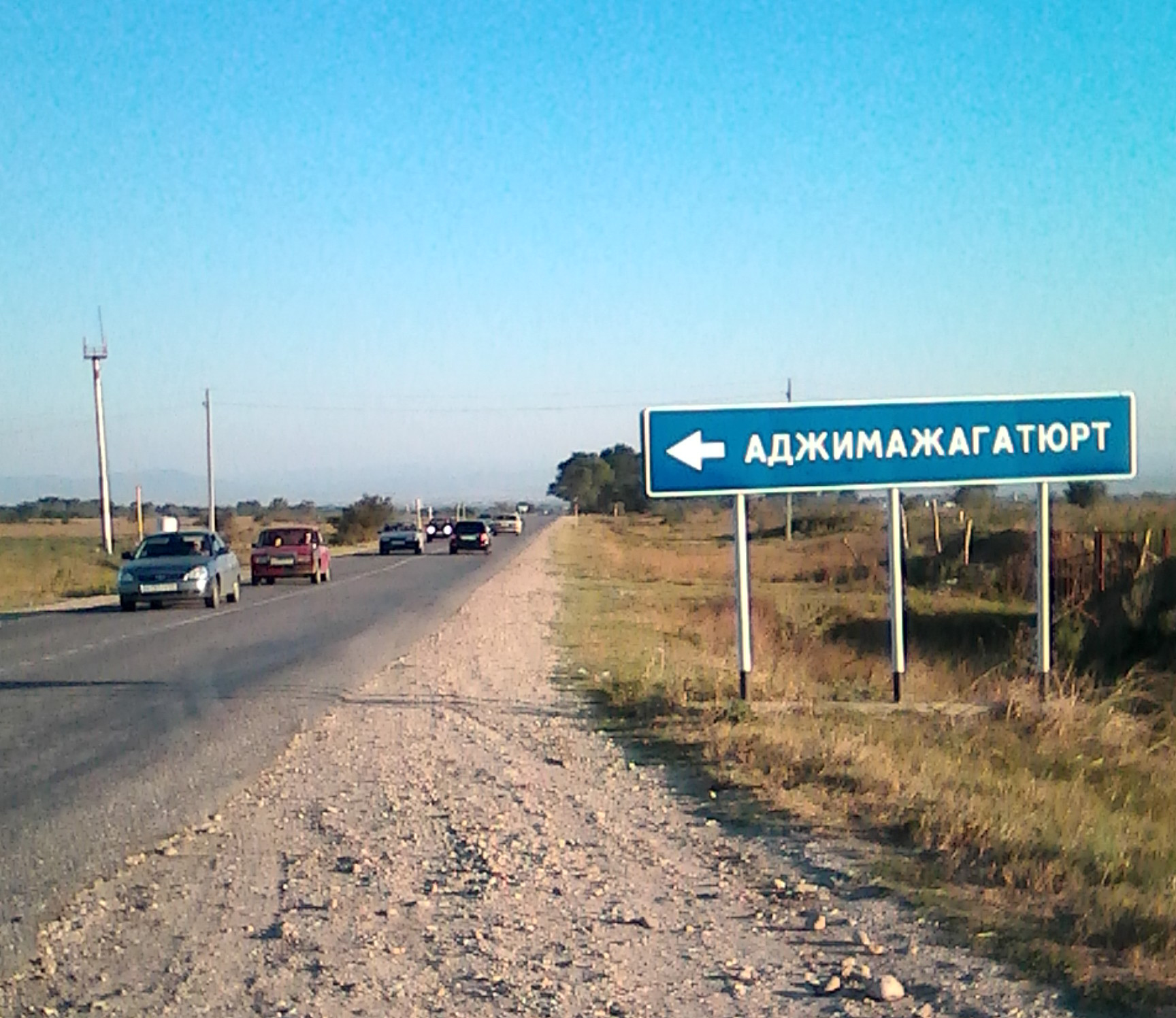

- Location within Republic of Dagestan Location within Russia
- Coordinates: 43°20′N 46°30′E
- Country: Russia
- Region: Republic of Dagestan
- District: Khasavyurtovsky District
- Time zone: UTC+3:00

Adzhimazhagatyurt (Russian: Аджимажагатюрт; Kumyk: Ажимажагьатюрт, Ajimajahatyurt; Chechen: Хьаьж-МӀаьж-Йурт, Ẋäƶ-Mjäƶ-Yurt) is a rural locality (a selo) in Khasavyurtovsky District, Republic of Dagestan, Russia. Population: 1,371 (2021 census); 914 (2002 census); 369 (1989 Soviet census). There are 21 streets.

== Geography ==
Adzhimazhagatyurt is located 15 km northwest of Khasavyurt (the district's administrative centre) by road. Batashyurt is the nearest rural locality.
