= Toturbiykala =

Toturbiykala Тотурбийкала Узун-отар
- Selo
- Location within Republic of Dagestan Location within Russia
- Coordinates: 43°12′N 46°41′E
- Country: Russia
- Region: Republic of Dagestan
- District: Khasavyurtovsky District
- Time zone: UTC+3:00

Toturbiykala (Russian: Тотурбийкала; Kumyk: Узун-отар, Uzun-otar) is a rural locality (a selo) in Khasavyurtovsky District, Republic of Dagestan, Russia. Population: 3,724 (2021 census); 2,306 (2002 census); 1,507 (1989 Soviet census). There are 28 streets.

== Geography ==
Toturbiykala is located 12 km southeast of Khasavyurt (the district's administrative centre) by road. Endirey is the nearest rural locality.
