= Khamavyurt =

Khamavyurt Хамавюрт Хамавюрт Хаама-Йурт
- Selo
- Location within Republic of Dagestan Location within Russia
- Coordinates: 43°16′N 46°25′E
- Country: Russia
- Region: Republic of Dagestan
- District: Khasavyurtovsky District
- Time zone: UTC+3:00

Khamavyurt (Russian: Хамавюрт; Kumyk: Хамавюрт, Xamavyurt; Chechen: Хаама-Йурт, Xaama-Yurt) is a rural locality (a selo) in Khasavyurtovsky District, Republic of Dagestan, Russia. Population: 3,644 (2021 census); 2,786 (2002 census); 2,416 (1989 Soviet census). There are 28 streets.

== Geography ==
Khamavyurt is located 19 km northwest of Khasavyurt (the district's administrative centre) by road. Tsiyab-Tsoloda is the nearest rural locality.
