= Umashaul =

Umashaul Умашаул Умашавул
- Selo
- Location within Republic of Dagestan Location within Russia
- Coordinates: 43°19′N 46°41′E
- Country: Russia
- Region: Republic of Dagestan
- District: Khasavyurtovsky District
- Time zone: UTC+3:00

Umashaul (Russian: Умашаул; Kumyk: Умашавул, romanized: Umaşawul) is a rural locality (a selo) in Batayurtovsky Selsoviet, Khasavyurtovsky District, Republic of Dagestan, Russia. 830 (2021 census); 1,336 (2002 census); 1,531 (1989 Soviet census). There are 12 streets.

== Geography ==
Umashaul is located 16 km northeast of Khasavyurt (the district's administrative centre) by road. Batayurt is the nearest rural locality.
