= Seraji =

Seraji (Persian: سراجی) may refer to:

- Seraji, Iran, a village in Kerman Province, Iran
- Homayoun Seraji (1947–2007), Iranian scientist
- Mahbod Seraji (born 1956), American writer
- Mahmoud Seraji (1934–2017), Iranian poet and author
- Nasrine Seraji (born 1957), Iranian-British architect
