= Osmanyurt =

Osmanyurt Османюрт Ӏосман-Йурт
- Selo
- Location within Republic of Dagestan Location within Russia
- Coordinates: 43°18′N 46°31′E
- Country: Russia
- Region: Republic of Dagestan
- District: Khasavyurtovsky District
- Time zone: UTC+3:00

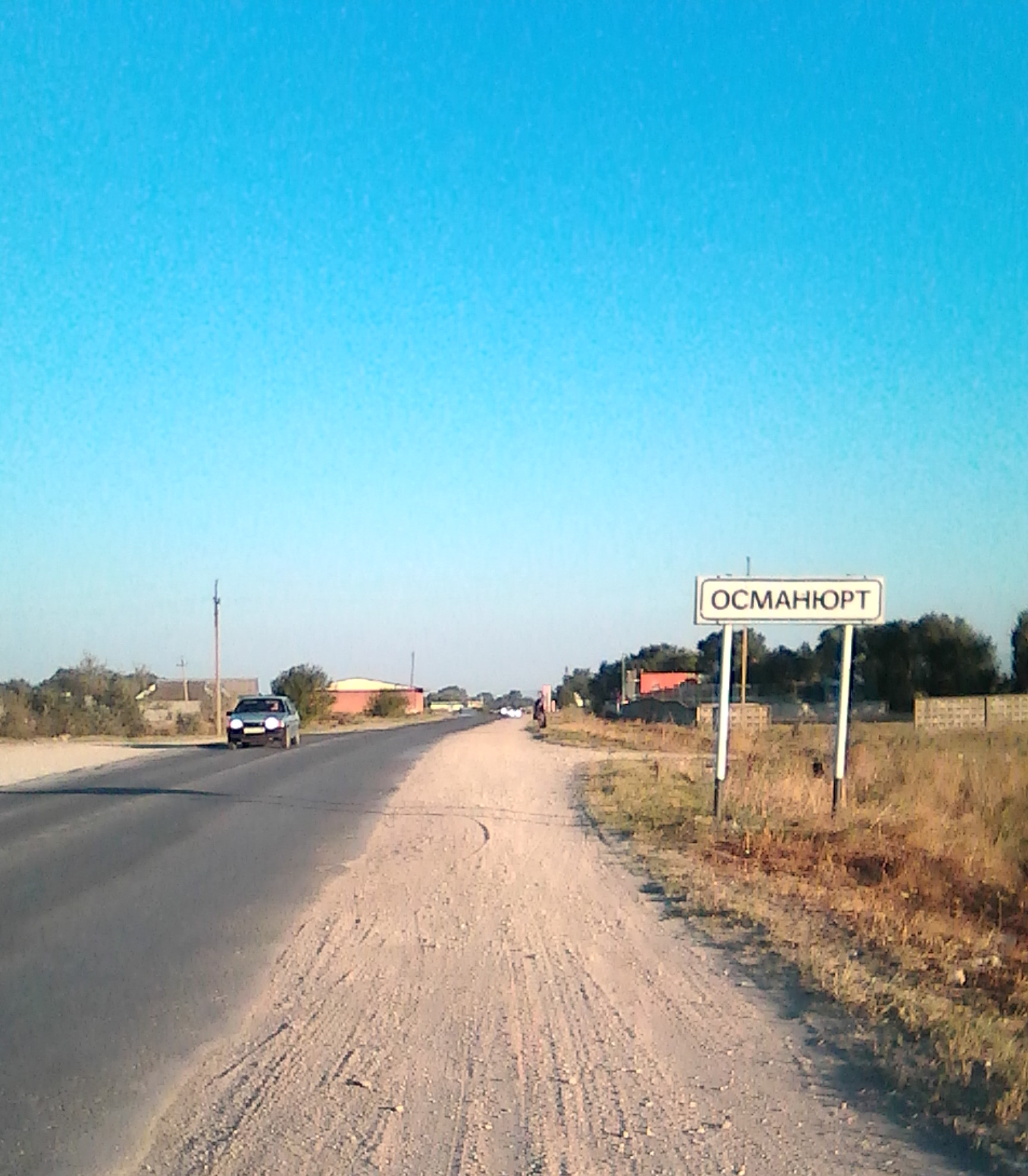
Osmanyurt

Osmanyurt (Russian: Османюрт; Chechen: Ӏосман-Йурт, Josman-Yurt) is a rural locality (a selo) and the administrative centre of Osmanyurtovsky Selsoviet, Khasavyurtovsky District, Republic of Dagestan, Russia. Population: 2,598 (2010 census); 2,424 (2002 census); 1,647 (1989 Soviet census). There are 41 streets.

== Geography ==
Osmanyurt is located 9 km northwest of Khasavyurt (the district's administrative centre) by road. Simsir is the nearest rural locality.
