= Novosositli =

Novosositli Новососитли Цӏияб Сасикь
- Selo
- Location within Republic of Dagestan Location within Russia
- Coordinates: 43°23′N 46°35′E
- Country: Russia
- Region: Republic of Dagestan
- District: Khasavyurtovsky District
- Time zone: UTC+3:00

Novosositli (Russian: Новососитли; Avar: Цӏияб Сасикь) is a rural locality (a selo) in Khasavyurtovsky District, Republic of Dagestan, Russia. Population: 2,345 (2021 census); 1,325 (2002 census); 820 (1989 Soviet census). There are 18 streets.

== Geography ==
Novosositli is located 19 km north of Khasavyurt (the district's administrative centre) by road. Tsiyab Ichichali is the nearest rural locality.
