= Sadovoye, Khasavyurtovsky District =

Sadovoye Садовое
- Selo
- Location within Republic of Dagestan Location within Russia
- Coordinates: 43°20′N 46°46′E
- Country: Russia
- Region: Republic of Dagestan
- District: Khasavyurtovsky District
- Time zone: UTC+3:00

Sadovoye (Russian: Садовое) is a rural locality (a selo) in Pokrovsky Selsoviet, Khasavyurtovsky District, Republic of Dagestan, Russia. Population: 1,108 (2021 census); 770 (2002 census); 649 (1989 Soviet census). There are 24 streets.

== Geography ==
Sadovoye is located 23 km northeast of Khasavyurt (the district's administrative centre) by road. Novy Kostek is the nearest rural locality.
