= Novoselskoye, Republic of Dagestan =

Novoselskoye Новосельское Керла-Йурт
- Selo
- Location within Republic of Dagestan Location within Russia
- Coordinates: 43°25′N 46°28′E
- Country: Russia
- Region: Republic of Dagestan
- District: Khasavyurtovsky District
- Time zone: UTC+3:00

Novoselskoye (Russian: Новосельское; Chechen: Керла-Йурт, Kerla-Yurt) is a rural locality (a selo) and the administrative centre of Novoselsky Selsoviet, Khasavyurtovsky District, Republic of Dagestan, Russia. 3,280 (2021 census); 2,918 (2002 census); 2,443 (1989 Soviet census). There are 24 streets.

== Geography ==
Novoselskoye is located 32 km north of Khasavyurt (the district's administrative centre) by road. Moksob is the nearest rural locality.
