= Kadyrotar =

Kadyrotar Кадыротар Къеди-Отар
- Selo
- Location within Republic of Dagestan Location within Russia
- Coordinates: 43°26′N 46°39′E
- Country: Russia
- Region: Republic of Dagestan
- District: Khasavyurtovsky District
- Time zone: UTC+3:00

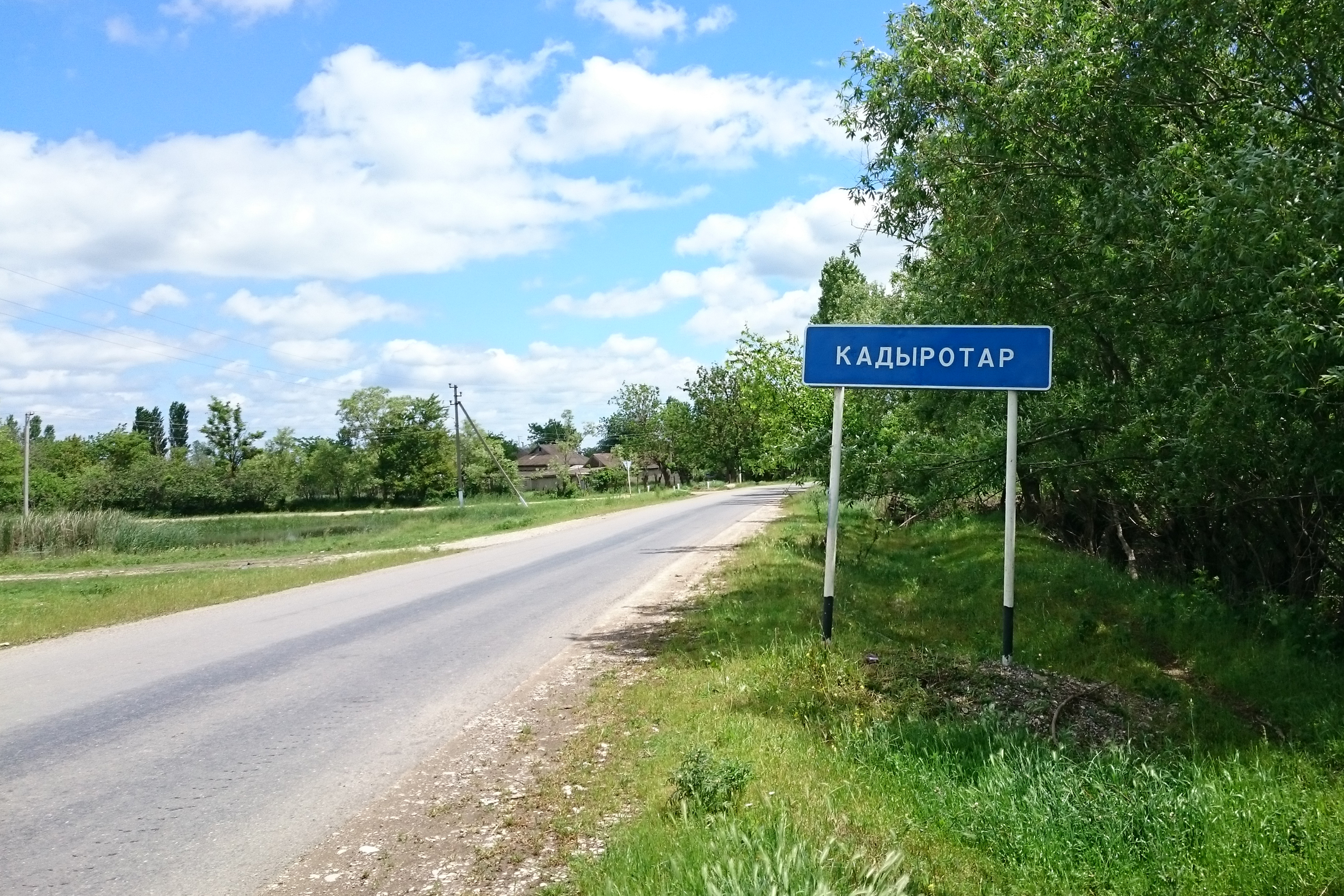
Entrance to the village of Kadyrotar

Kadyrotar (Russian: Кадыротар; Chechen: Къеди-Отар, Q̇edi-Otar) is a rural locality (a selo) in Adilotarsky Selsoviet, Khasavyurtovsky District, Republic of Dagestan, Russia. Population: 807 (2010 census); 774 (2002 census); 565 (1989 Soviet census). There are 17 streets.

== Geography ==
Kadyrotar is located 26 km north of Khasavyurt (the district's administrative centre) by road. Adilotar is the nearest rural locality.
