= Tshiyab Ichichali =

Tsiyab Ichichali Цияб-Ичичали
- Selo
- Location within Republic of Dagestan Location within Russia
- Coordinates: 43°23′N 46°37′E
- Country: Russia
- Region: Republic of Dagestan
- District: Khasavyurtovsky District
- Time zone: UTC+3:00

Tshiyab Ichichali (Russian: Цияб-Ичичали) is a rural locality (a selo) in Khasavyurtovsky District, Republic of Dagestan, Russia. Population: 2,462 (2021 census); 1,866 (2002 census); 1,341 (1989 Soviet census). There are 21 streets.

== Geography ==
Tshiyab Ichichali is located 19 km (12 mi) north of Khasavyurt (the district's administrative centre) by road. Siukh is the nearest rural locality.
