= Nuradilovo =

Nuradilovo Нурадилово
- Selo
- Location within Republic of Dagestan Location within Russia
- Coordinates: 43°17′N 46°27′E
- Country: Russia
- Region: Republic of Dagestan
- District: Khasavyurtovsky District
- Time zone: UTC+3:00

Nuradilovo (Russian: Нурадилово) is a rural locality (a selo) in Khasavyurtovsky District, Republic of Dagestan, Russia. Population: 5,247 (2021 census); 3,149 (2002 census); 2,402 (1989 Soviet census). There are 40 streets.

== Geography ==
Nuradilovo is located 17 km northwest of Khasavyurt (the district's administrative centre) by road. Khamavyurt is the nearest rural locality.
