= Akbulatyurt =

Akbulatyurt Акбулатюрт Акхболт-Йурт
- Selo
- Location within Republic of Dagestan Location within Russia
- Coordinates: 43°27′N 46°23′E
- Country: Russia
- Region: Republic of Dagestan
- District: Khasavyurtovsky District
- Time zone: UTC+3:00

Akbulatyurt (Russian: Акбулатюрт; Chechen: Акхболт-Йурт, Aqbolt-Yurt) is a rural locality (a selo) in Khasavyurtovsky District, Republic of Dagestan, Russia. Population: 1,057 (2021 census); 725 (2002 census); 442 (1989 Soviet census). There are 9 streets.

== Geography ==
Akbulatyurt is located 32 km northwest of Khasavyurt (the district's administrative centre) by road. Terechnoye is the nearest rural locality.
