= Abdurashid, Dagestan =

Abdurashid Абдурашид Ӏабдрашид-Отар
- Selo
- Location within Republic of Dagestan Location within Russia
- Coordinates: 43°23′N 46°40′E
- Country: Russia
- Region: Dagestan
- District: Khasavyurtovsky District
- Time zone: [[UTC+3:00]]

Abdurashid (Russian: Абдурашид; Chechen: Ӏабдрашид-Отар, Jabdraşid-Otar) is a rural locality (a selo) in Pokrovsky Selsoviet of Khasavyurtovsky District, Dagestan, Russia. The population was 316 as of 2010.

== Geography ==
Abdurashid is located 18 km north of Khasavyurt (the district's administrative centre) by road.

== Ethnicity ==
The village is inhabited by Chechens and Avars.
