= Bayram, Republic of Dagestan =

Bayram Байрам
- Selo
- Location within Republic of Dagestan Location within Russia
- Coordinates: 43°15′N 46°39′E
- Country: Russia
- Region: Republic of Dagestan
- District: Khasavyurtovsky District
- Time zone: UTC+3:00

Bayram (Russian: Байрам) is a rural locality (a selo) in Karlanyurtovsky Selsoviet, Khasavyurtovsky District, Republic of Dagestan, Russia. 634 (2021 census); 455 (2002 census); 421 (1989 Soviet census). There are 14 streets.

== Geography ==
Bayram is located 8 km east of Khasavyurt (the district's administrative centre) by road. Petrakovskoye is the nearest rural locality.
