= Pyatiletka, Republic of Dagestan =

Pyatiletka Пятилетка
- Selo
- Location within Republic of Dagestan Location within Russia
- Coordinates: 43°22′N 46°58′E
- Country: Russia
- Region: Republic of Dagestan
- District: Khasavyurtovsky District
- Time zone: UTC+3:00

Pyatiletka (Russian: Пятилетка) is a rural locality (a selo) in Kosteksky Selsoviet, Khasavyurtovsky District, Republic of Dagestan, Russia. 1,184 (2010 census); 1,239 (2002 census); 834 (1989 Soviet census). There are 21 streets.

== Geography ==
Pyatiletka is located 39 km northeast of Khasavyurt (the district's administrative centre) by road. Akaro is the nearest rural locality.
