= Adilotar =

Adilotar Адильотар Эдал-Отар
- Selo
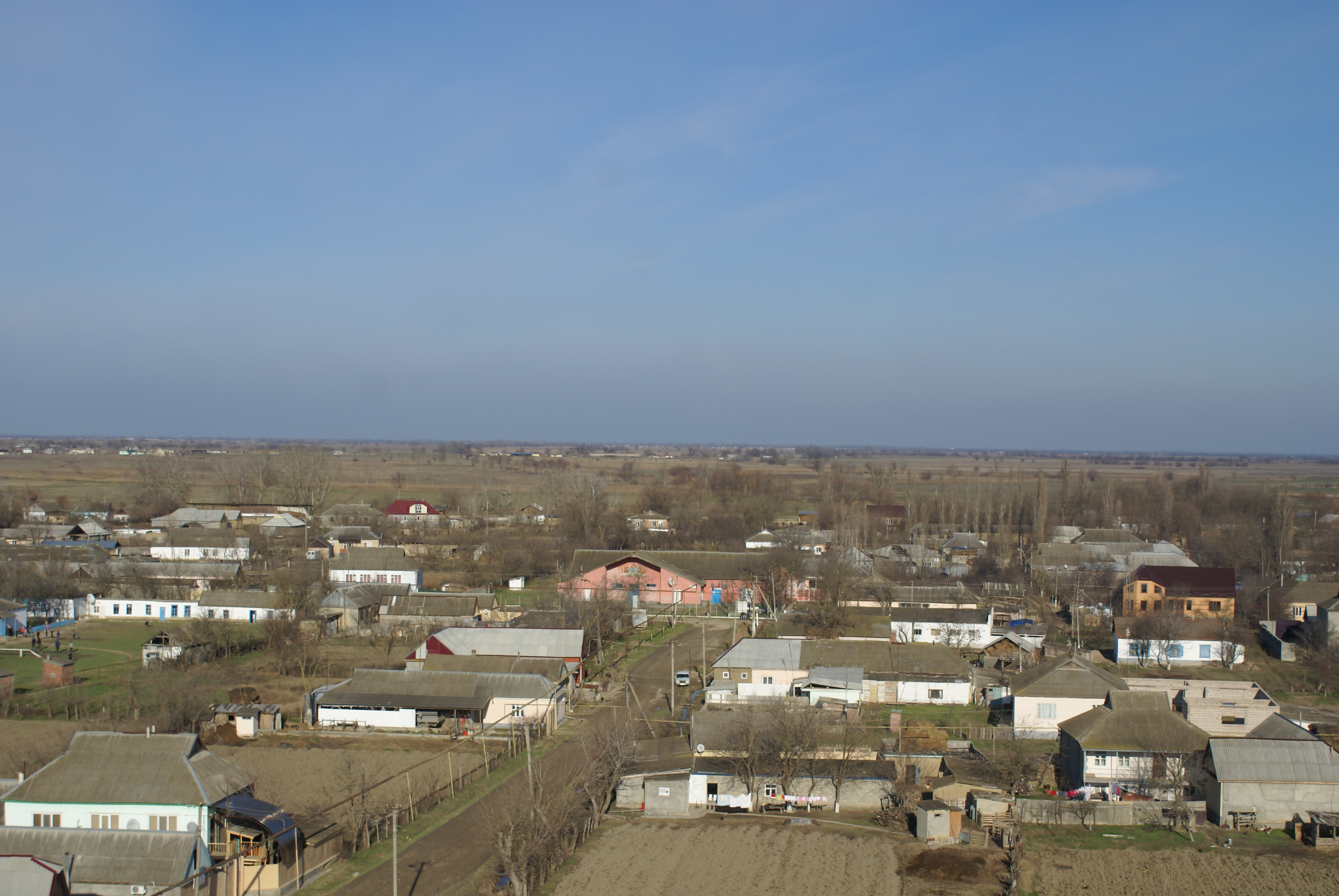
- Adilotar seen from above

- Location within Republic of Dagestan Location within Russia
- Coordinates: 43°27′N 46°40′E
- Country: Russia
- Region: Republic of Dagestan
- District: Khasavyurtovsky District
- Time zone: UTC+3:00

Adilotar (Russian: Адильотар; Chechen: Эдал-Отар, Edal-Otar) is a rural locality (a selo) and the administrative centre of Adilotarsky Selsoviet, Khasavyurtovsky District, Republic of Dagestan, Russia. Population: 1,284 (2010 census); 1,173 (2002 census); 761 (1989 Soviet census). There are 32 streets.

== Geography ==
Adilotar is located 29 km north of Khasavyurt (the district's administrative centre) by road. Tutlar is the nearest rural locality.
