= Kandauraul =

Kandauraul Кандаураул Сала-Йурт Къандавур авул
- Selo
- Location within Republic of Dagestan Location within Russia
- Coordinates: 43°20′N 46°33′E
- Country: Russia
- Region: Republic of Dagestan
- District: Khasavyurtovsky District
- Time zone: UTC+3:00

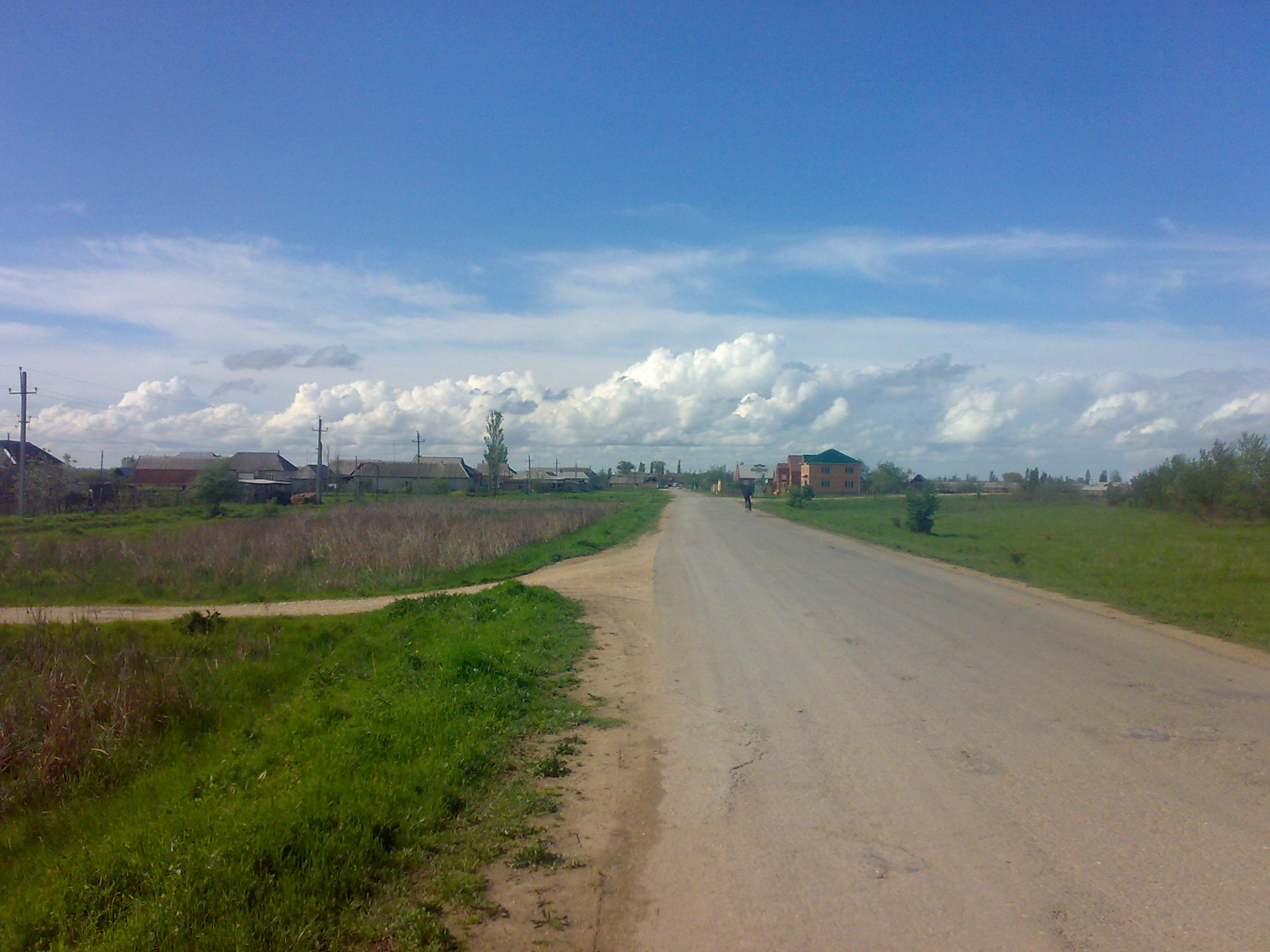
View of the village Kandauraul

Kandauraul (Russian: Кандаураул; Chechen: Сала-Йурт, Sala-Yurt; Kumyk: Къандавур авул, Qandavur avul) is a rural locality (a selo) in Khasavyurtovsky District, Republic of Dagestan, Russia. 2,192 (2021 census); 1,674 (2002 census); 1,125 (1989 Soviet census). There are 41 streets.

== Geography ==
Kandauraul is located 12 km north of Khasavyurt (the district's administrative centre) by road. Bammatyurt is the nearest rural locality.
