= Moksob =

Moksob Моксоб
- Selo
- Location within Republic of Dagestan Location within Russia
- Coordinates: 43°26′N 46°29′E
- Country: Russia
- Region: Republic of Dagestan
- District: Khasavyurtovsky District
- Time zone: UTC+3:00

Moksob (Russian: Моксоб) is a rural locality (a selo) in Khasavyurtovsky District, Republic of Dagestan, Russia. 525 (2021 census); 579 (2002 census); 288 (1989 Soviet census). There are 10 streets.

== Geography ==
Moksob is located 33 km north of Khasavyurt (the district's administrative centre) by road. Novoselskoye is the nearest rural locality.
