= Bammatyurt =

Bammatyurt Бамматюрт Йоккха-Бамт-Йурт
- Selo
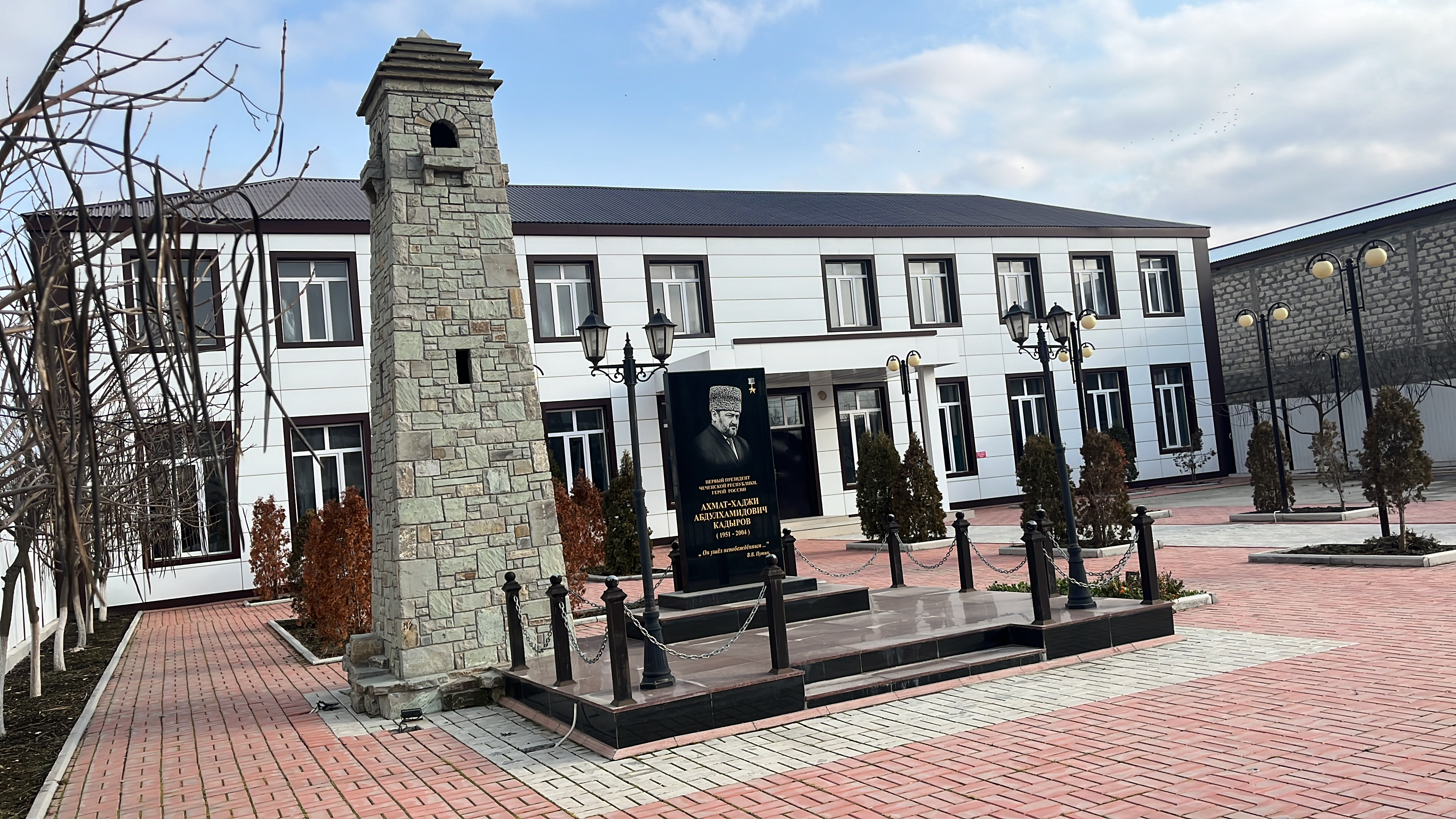
- Bammatyurt, rural cultural center

- Location within Republic of Dagestan Location within Russia
- Coordinates: 43°20′N 46°36′E
- Country: Russia
- Region: Republic of Dagestan
- District: Khasavyurtovsky District
- Time zone: UTC+3:00

Bammatyurt (Russian: Бамматюрт; Chechen: Йоккха-Бамт-Йурт, Yokqa-Bamt-Yurt) is a rural locality (a selo) in Khasavyurtovsky District, Republic of Dagestan, Russia. Population: 4,502 (2021 census); 3,608 (2002 census); 2,671 (1989 Soviet census). There are 31 streets.

== Geography ==
Bammatyurt is located 14 km north of Khasavyurt (the district's administrative centre) by road. Kandauraul is the nearest rural locality.
