= Umarotar =

Umarotar Умаротар Ӏумар-Отар
- Selo
- Location within Republic of Dagestan Location within Russia
- Coordinates: 43°25′N 46°41′E
- Country: Russia
- Region: Republic of Dagestan
- District: Khasavyurtovsky District
- Time zone: UTC+3:00

Umarotar (Russian: Умаротар; Chechen: Ӏумар-Отар, Jumar-Otar) is a rural locality (a selo) in Kazmaaulsky Selsoviet, Khasavyurtovsky District, Republic of Dagestan, Russia. 307 (2010 census); 302 (2002 census); 539 (1989 Soviet census). There are 4 streets.

== Geography ==
Umarotar is located 34 km northeast of Khasavyurt (the district's administrative centre) by road. Kadyrotar is the nearest rural locality.
