= Kemsiyurt =

Kemsiyurt Кемсиюрт
- Selo
- Location within Republic of Dagestan Location within Russia
- Coordinates: 43°26′N 46°26′E
- Country: Russia
- Region: Republic of Dagestan
- District: Khasavyurtovsky District
- Time zone: UTC+3:00

Kemsiyurt (Chechen: Кемси-Йурт, Russian: Кемсиюрт) is a rural locality (a selo) in Novoselsky Selsoviet, Khasavyurtovsky District, Republic of Dagestan, Russia. Population: 642 (2021 census); 562 (2002 census); 216 (1989 Soviet census). There are 7 streets.

== Geography ==
Kemsiyurt is located 29 km north of Khasavyurt (the district's administrative centre) by road. Terechnoye is the nearest rural locality.
