= Mahmoud Seraji =

American poet

Mahmoud Seraji (Persian: محمود سراجی) AKA, M.S. Shahed (م س شاهد) was an Iranian-American poet whose trilogy, MAZAMIR ESHGH, (مزامیر عشق) was published in 2008 in Iran.

== Life and Death ==
Mahmoud Seraji was born in Astara, Iran on August 23, 1934. He died on April 27, 2017, in Des Moines, Iowa. He was an attorney by profession, but was banned from practicing law in Iran after the Iranian Revolution. He immigrated to America in 2008 where his children lived. He's the father of Mahbod Seraji, the author of critically acclaimed novel Rooftops of Tehran. A number of his poems appear on sites such as Iranian.com, PezhvakeIran.com and Yoldash. Mahmoud Seraji battled cancer for decades. He was first diagnosed with throat cancer in 1994. At the age of 82, his colon cancer spread to his lungs, liver, bladder and brain, causing his death.

== Literary work ==
Seraji's trilogy, MAZAMIR ESHGH, was banned from publication for a number of years in Iran. The first volume of his work, SHATHIAT, is a collection of Sufi poetry in the tradition of VAHDAT VOJOOD (Persian: وحدت وجود). His poetry was considered blasphemous by the Mullahs as he claimed that the life of an authentic seeker of God is centered around exploring the truth by means of love and devotion. The real discovery of God in the worshiper's inner-self leads to a brand of self-actualization that transcends all forms of knowledge and experiences.

According to Seraji, it’s only through this type of excursion that enlightenment and true inspiration of God may be studied and realized.

You, the most knowledgeable of all beings The gentlest of all things

I’m lost in the maze of my existence Enlighten me about my essence

The theme of misplacement is present throughout Seraji’s work in Shathiat, Al-Aghlo-Eghal, and most of his other work. In his Qasida, Al-Aghal-o-Eghal — the SCHACKLE, eghal, the instrument that's tied around a camel's ankle to keep it from wandering away is used as a metaphor for the mind, confined by the limits of logic. The answers to all mysteries of the universe, according to his brand of Sufism is coded in one’s inner self, and may only be cracked by the power of love and imagination.

It’s the fervor of love that creates life Filling the universe with divine intoxication and existence

== The Greatest Memory ==
His greatest memory, according to an article published by his son, KHATERIE az BABA (Persian: خا طر ه‌ای از بابا) was visiting the tomb of Rumi, the Sufi poet of the 11th century, in Konya, Turkey.
