= Rooftops of Tehran (novel) =

2009 novel by Mahbod Seraji

- Author: Mahbod Seraji
- Language: English
- Published: 2009
- Publication place: United States

Rooftops of Tehran, a novel written by Mahbod Seraji, was published by New American Library in May 2009.

== Reception ==
Upon its publication, Rooftops won critical acclaim as an Indie Next Notable and was selected in the Outstanding Debut Category by the American Booksellers Association. Rooftops of Tehran was the One Book Program selection at Villanova University, Broward College's wRites of Spring 2010 final pick, and Earlham College's First Year Experience selection. The book was also voted one of the top 25 bookclub favorites of 2009, and one of the San Francisco Chronicle's top 50 notable books of the Bay Area. Rooftops was translated into 22 languages.

== Story ==
In a middle-class neighborhood of Iran's sprawling capital city, 17-year-old Pasha Shahed spends the summer of 1973 on his rooftop with his best friend Ahmed. Here he dreamed about his future and wrestled with a crushing secret: his love for his beautiful neighbor, Zari, who has been betrothed since birth to Pasha's friend and mentor, Doctor, a university student and political activist on the SAVAK hunt list. Despite Pasha's guilt, the long, hot summer days transform the couple's tentative relationship into a rich emotional bond. But the bliss of their perfect, stolen summer is abruptly shattered in a single night when Pasha unwittingly guides the Shah's secret police to Doctor's hiding place. The violent consequences awaken Pasha and his friends to the reality of what life is like under the rule of a powerful despot. This led Zari to make a choice from which Pasha may never recover.
