= Yoldash =

- Type: Weekly newspaper
- Founded: 3 April 1917
- Language: Kumyk
- Headquarters: Makhachkala, Dagestan
- Circulation: 5,000-8,000
- Website: https://yoldash.ru/

Yoldash (Kumyk: Ёлдаш, romanized: Yoldaş, lit. 'Comrade') is the main Kumyk language newspaper in Dagestan, Russia. It is the successor of the Soviet era Lenin yolu (Ленин ёлу, 'Lenin's Path'), which was an organ of the Dagestan Provincial Committee of the Communist Party of the Soviet Union.

The newspaper is published weekly in five to eight thousand copies.

In 1968, it received the Order of the Badge of Honour.
