= Palatal harmony =

Type of vowel harmony

Palatal harmony, also called palatovelar harmony, is a type of vowel harmony that manifests in forcing agreement between vowels that are either neighboring or in the same word regarding their place of articulation—specifically the difference between the palatal-articulated front vowels and the back vowels which are articulated closer to the velum. It is found in Finno-Ugric and Turkic languages, as well as the North American languages of Yawelmani and many others. Under the palatal harmony rule a word may contain either all back vowels or front vowels.

== Turkish ==
Vowel harmony in Turkish and other Turkic languages has "multiple features"—in some cases, agreement between vowels is required with respect to more than one distinctive feature. One of those features is called "backness" or what is more formally called palatal harmony. While all Turkic vowels agree in "backness" (palatal harmony), some high vowels may also agree in "roundness" (labial harmony). For example, the root vowel in the word yüz, meaning face, is rounded, but the nominative plural suffix -ler only agrees with the root vowel in backness, not roundness (yüzler). The genitive singular suffix -ün, as in yüzün agrees with the root vowel in respect to both backness and roundness.

Several examples from Turkish demonstrate roundness harmony with backness (palatal) harmony (note that /a/ in Turkish is strictly a back vowel) :

Unrounded		Rounded	
kilim-im	my carpet	gül-üm	my rose
ev-im	my house	köy-üm	my village
kız-ım	my daughter	kuş-um	my bird
kaz-ım	my goose	koz-um	my walnut

In the above examples, the suffix vowel alternates with vowel backness and roundness, but not vowel height.

== Turkic languages ==
=== Chagatay ===
Vowels in Chagatay Turkic exhibit palatal harmony with back vowels (suffixes containing ġ, q) or front vowels (suffixes containing g, k):

Back-vocalic		Front-vocalic	
yol-ġa	to the way	Tengri-gä	to God
artuġ-raq	more	köp-räk	more
tap-maq	to find	ber-mäk	to give
bol-ġay	it will be	äylä-gäy	he will do
az-ġïna	very little	köngül-ginä	a little heart
burna-ġï	first former	yüzi-dä-ki	that in his face
sat-ġučï	seller	ber-güči	giver
mung-luġ	sad	parī yüz-lüg	fairy-faced
aš-lïq	corn	ösrük-lük	drunkenness
		tirig-lik	life
