= Mahbod Seraji =

American novelist

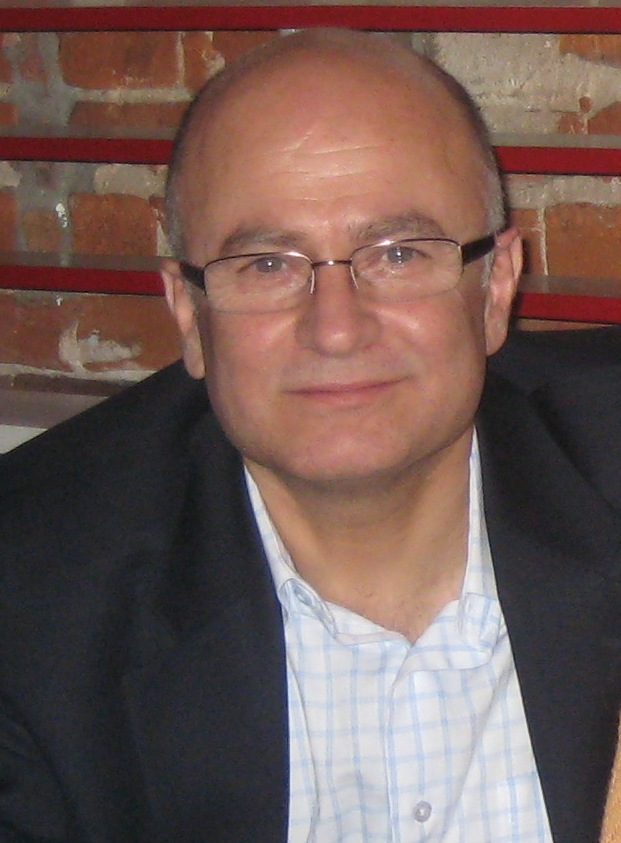
- Born: October 18, 1956 (age 69); Bandar-e Anzali, Gilan, Iran
- Education: University of Iowa
- Occupation: Novelist
- Website: mahbodseraji.com

Mahbod Seraji Ph.D., (Persian:مهبد سراجی) is an Iranian-American author whose critically acclaimed novel, Rooftops of Tehran, was published by NAL (an imprint of Penguin) in May 2009. Mahbod's short stories and articles can be found on Truthout.org; Bookreporter; Velvet Illusions; Iranian.com.

== Early life and education ==
Mahbod Seraji was born in Bandar Anzali on October 18, 1956. He came to America in May 1976 to attend college. It wasn’t long after his arrival that upheaval and turmoil swept his country as Shah of Iran was overthrown in 1979 setting off a series of events that led to the Iran Hostage Crisis, and Iraq’s invasion of Iran. Mahbod attended the University of Iowa where he received his Bachelors, Masters and Doctorate degrees.

== Professional life ==
Seraji started his professional career at Motorola where he worked from 1990 to 1995. After a two-year assignment at Arthur Andersen, Mahbod accepted an appointment as the Senior Vice President of Moore - Forum Alliance. In 2000, he moved to San Francisco where he served as the vice president and chief learning officer at PeopleSoft University. After Oracle's acquisition of PeopleSoft in 2005, Mahbod became the Vice President of Organizational Development at Chiron Corporation. Mahbod is currently an internationally sought after management consultant.

== Writing career ==
Seraji’s debut novel Rooftops of Tehran examines the human cost of political repression. Rooftops is a passionate philosophical novel set in pre-Islamic revolution in Iran and speaks to the universality of human condition irrespective of culture, religion, and nationality. In an interview at the end of the book Seraji says that "In writing Rooftops of Tehran, I wanted to acquaint readers with Iran, and bring to life a small part of the centuries-old Persian culture. At a time when the country of my birth is often portrayed in the news media as 'the enemy,' I chose to tell a story of friendship and humor, love and hope, universal experiences valued by people in all times and places." Rooftops of Tehran was the final selection for Villanova University's One Book Program and Broward College’s writes of Spring 2010 Literary Festival., and Earlham College's First Year Experience pick . Rooftops of Tehran was also voted as one of top 25 bookclub favorites of 2009. San Francisco Chronicle chose Rooftops of Tehran as one top 50 notable books of Bay Area in 2009. Rooftops of Tehran was also selected as one of the top debuts of 2009 by the American Booksellers Association and an Indie Next Notable in June 2009 Rooftops of Tehran has been translated into 22 languages.

== See also ==
- Mahmoud Seraji, his father
