= Band-e Saraji =

Band-e Saraji بندسراجي
- Village
- Location within Iran
- Coordinates: 28°42′59″N 57°41′52″E
- Country: Iran
- Province: Kerman
- County: Jiroft
- Bakhsh: Central
- Rural District: Halil

Population (2006)
  - Total: 127
- Time zone: UTC+3:30 (IRST)
  - Summer (DST): UTC+4:30 (IRDT)

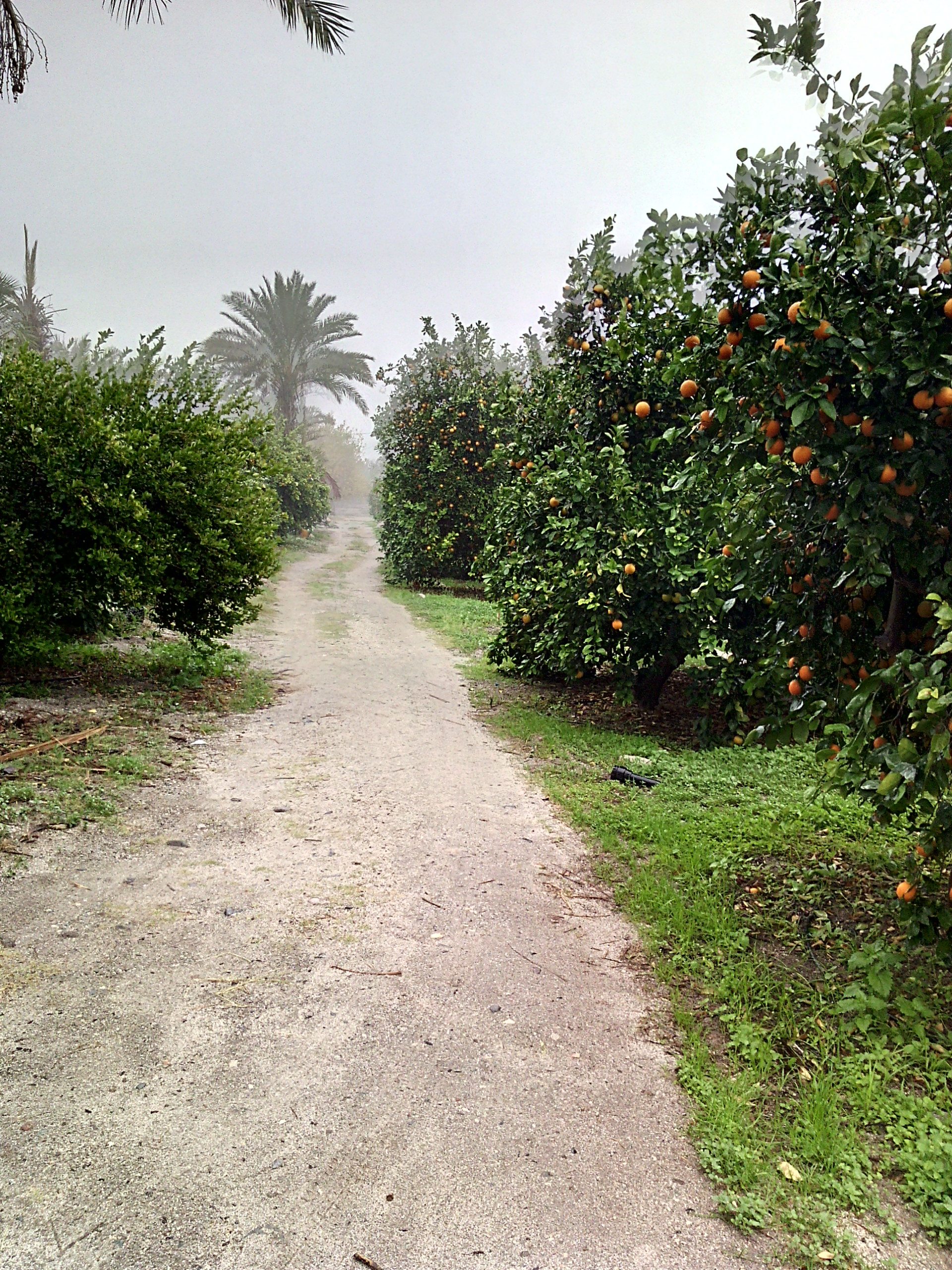
Band- e saragi

Band-e Saraji (Persian: بندسراجي, also Romanized as Band-e Sarājī, Band-e Serājī, Band-e Serrājī, Band Sarajī, and Band Sarrājī; also known as Serājī) is a village in Halil Rural District, in the Central District of Jiroft County, Kerman Province, Iran. At the 2006 census, its population was 127, in 34 families.
