= Kumyk language =

Kipchak Turkic language

Kumyk
- Къумукъ тил Qumuq til قوموق تیل
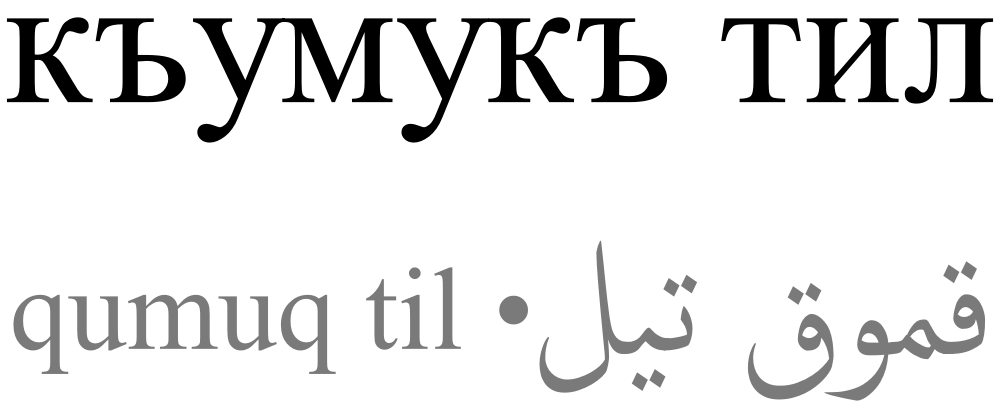
- Kumyk written in Cyrillic script, along with obsolete Latin and Perso-Arabic counterparts.
- Native to: North Caucasus
- Region: Dagestan, Chechnya, North Ossetia
- Ethnicity: Kumyks
- Native speakers: 520,000 (2020)
- Language family: Turkic: Common Turkic; Kipchak; Kipchak–Cuman; Kumyk
- Writing system: Cyrillic, Latin, Arabic

Official status
- Official language in: Dagestan (Russia)

Language codes
- ISO 639-2: kum
- ISO 639-3: kum
- Glottolog: kumy1244
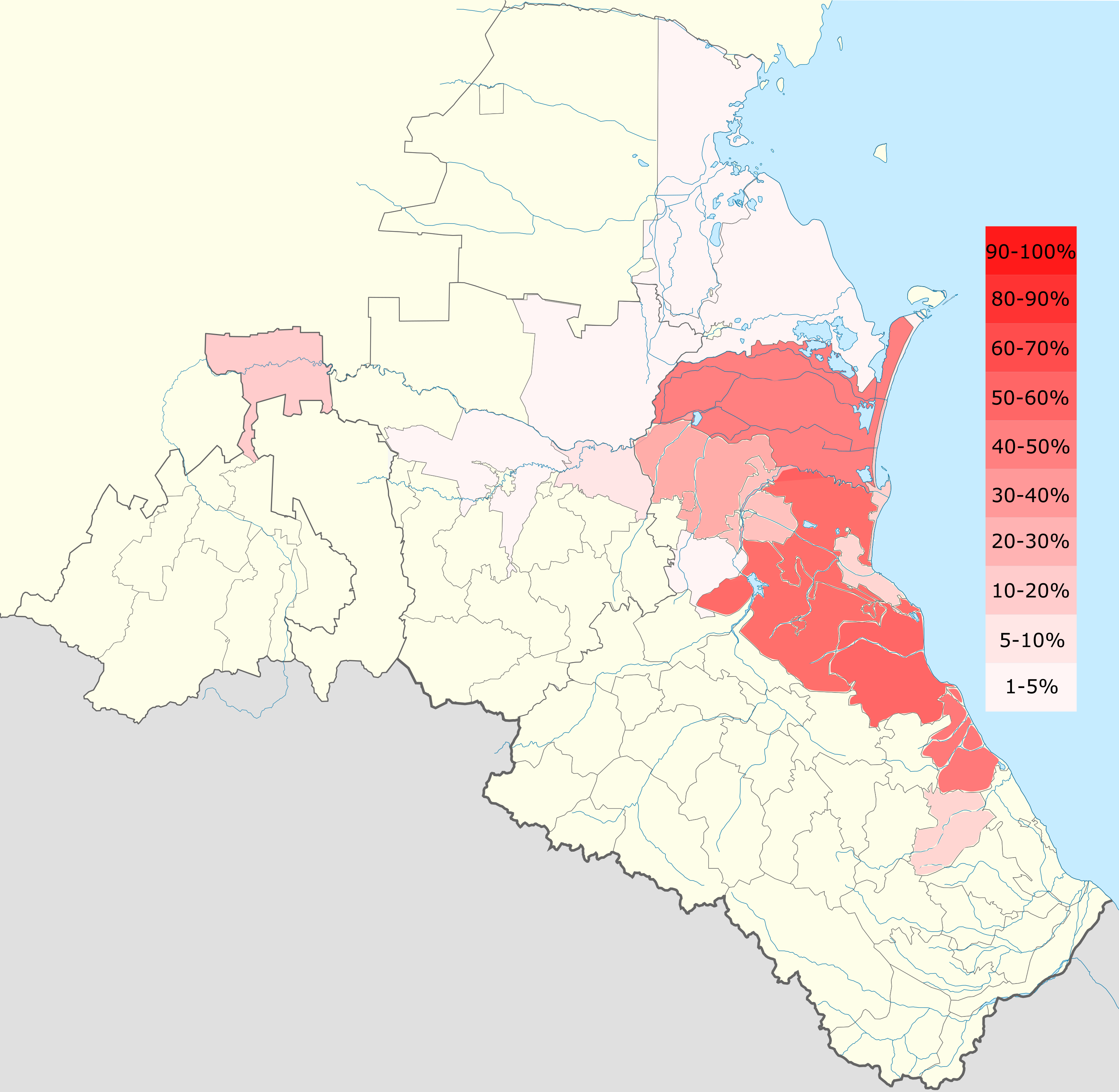
- Share of the Kumyk population in areas of traditional residence in the Caucasus according to the 2010 census

- Kumyk is classified as Vulnerable by the UNESCO Atlas of the World's Languages in Danger

Linguistic map of the Caucasus region: Kumyk is spoken in the dark blue area, numbered "25."

External videos
- A series of videos about the similarities of languages
- Comparison of Kumyk and Tatar languages

Kumyk (къумукъ тил, qumuq til, قوموق تیل) is a Turkic language spoken by about 520,000 people, mainly by the Kumyks, in the Dagestan, North Ossetia and Chechen republics of the Russian Federation. Until the 20th century Kumyk was the lingua franca of the Northern Caucasus.

== Classification ==
Kumyk language belongs to the Kipchak-Cuman subfamily of the Kipchak family of the Turkic languages. It's a descendant of the Cuman language, with likely influence from the Khazar language, and in addition contains words from the Bulghar and Oghuz substratum. The closest languages to Kumyk are Karachay-Balkar, Crimean Tatar, and Karaim languages.

Nikolay Baskakov, based on a 12th-century scripture named Codex Cumanicus, included modern Kumyk, Karachai-Balkar, Crimean Tatar, Karaim, and the language of Mamluk Kipchaks in the linguistic family of the Cuman-Kipchak language. Samoylovich also considered Cuman-Kipchak close to Kumyk and Karachai-Balkar.

Amongst the dialects of the Kumyk there are Kaitag, Terek (Güçük-yurt and Braguny), Buynaksk (Temir-Khan-Shura) and Xasavyurt. The latter two became basis for the literary language.

== History ==
Kumyk had been a lingua-franca of the bigger part of the Northern Caucasus, from Dagestan to Kabarda, until the 1930s and was an official language of communication between the North-Eastern Caucasian nations and the Russian administration. The language was known in Dagestan as simply Muslim language (Kumyk: бусурман тил, busurman til, بوسورمان تیل) due to its dominant role as the intertribal language of communication among various Muslim communities of the region.

The historian Georgi Derluguian made the following analogy with regards to the role of Turkic languages in the Caucasus and beyond:

“... For almost a thousand years, the Turkic languages that dominated the peoples of the steppe – Kumyk and Tatar – served, like Swahili in East Africa or French among the aristocracies of Europe, as a common lingua franca in the multinational North Caucasus...”

In 1848, a professor of the "Caucasian Tatar" (Kumyk) Timofey Makarov published the first ever grammatical book in the Russian language for one of the Northern Caucasian languages, which was international Kumyk. Makarov wrote:

From the peoples speaking Tatar language I liked the most Kumyks, as for their language's distinction and precision, so for their closeness to the European civilization, but most importantly, I take in account that they live on the Left Flank of the Caucasian Front, where we're conducting military actions, and where all the peoples, apart from their own language, speak also Kumyk.

During the Soviet era, the role of Kumyk was consolidated when in 1923, it was declared to be the state language of Dagestan ASSR due to the fact that "the majority of the population of indigenous Dagestan speaks and understands the Turkic-Kumyk language... the experience of teaching the Turkic language in the schools of Mountainous Dagestan gave brilliant results... it was noted... that the “Turkic-Kumyk” language is the only language of communication of the citizens of indigenous Dagestan."

== Phonology ==
Kumyk vowels
	Front		Back	
Close	i ⟨и⟩	y ⟨уь⟩	ɯ ⟨ы⟩	u ⟨у⟩
Mid	e ⟨e⟩	ø ⟨оь⟩	o ⟨o⟩	
Open	æ ⟨ә⟩		a ⟨a⟩	

Kumyk consonants
		Labial	Dental	Palatal	Velar	Uvular	Glottal
Nasal		m ⟨м⟩	n ⟨н⟩		ŋ ⟨нг⟩	(ɴ) ⟨нг⟩	
Plosive/ Affricate	voiceless	p ⟨п⟩	t ⟨т⟩	tʃ ⟨ч⟩	k ⟨к⟩	q ⟨къ⟩ (Note: къ represents [ɢ] at the beginning of words, and [q] elsewhere (complementary distribution).)	
Plosive/ Affricate	voiced	b ⟨б⟩	d ⟨д⟩	dʒ ⟨дж⟩	ɡ ⟨г⟩	(ɢ) ⟨къ⟩	
Fricative	voiceless	f ⟨ф⟩	s ⟨c⟩	ʃ ⟨ш⟩		χ ⟨x⟩	h ⟨гь⟩
Fricative	voiced	β ⟨в⟩	z ⟨з⟩	ʒ ⟨ж⟩		ʁ ⟨гъ⟩	
Liquid	rhotic		r ⟨p⟩				
Liquid	lateral		l ⟨л⟩				
Semivowel				j ⟨й⟩			

== Orthography ==
Kumyk has been used as a lingua franca in Dagestan and Caucasus for some time.

The historic literary culture of Kumyks and the entire region of Dagestan, North Caucasus, and Southern Ukraine was the Cuman language. Kumyk is a direct descendant of Cuman, and its centuries-long literary tradition was a direct continuation of Cuman.

The oldest record of Kumyk language being written in the Arabic script, goes back to the mid-17th century. From the beginning of the 19th century, Kumyk literary language began to expand and grow, with an increase in the number of publications and books.

The orthography of Kumyk was derived from the Arabic script, although with minor modifications, only several additional letters, same as in Persian alphabet, to represent consonants. Vowels, of which there exists a relatively large number of them in Turkic languages, and in Kumyk in particular (8 or 9 vowels) were rarely and irregularly written in the Arabic script, with the use of matres lectionis, the three letters ʾalif ا, wāw و and yāʾ ي. This meant that, overall, this script was far from being adapted to Kumyk phonology.

In the beginning of the 20th century, parallel with other Turkic-Muslim minority ethnic groups within the Russian Empire, Kumyk speaking literaturists decided to undertake the task of standardization and improvement of the Arabic script. It was in this era that Kumyk literature flourished, and many poets, educators, and publishers rose. The first attempt at compiling an improved orthographic convention was done in 1915, by "Abdulhalim Jengutaevsky" in the preface of his Kumyk translation of the poem Layla and Majnun, published in Temir-Khan-Shura.

In the following years, vowel representations were standardized, and Arabic letters that had the same pronunciation in Karachay-Balkar were dropped and consolidated (For example, the letters ث and ص were dropped in favour of the letter س).

Later, as part of a new state campaign of Latinisation, a Latin alphabet was developed for Kumyk, derived from Yañalif, being officially adopted in 1928.

In the 1930s, the official Soviet policy was revised and the process of Cyrillization of Soviet languages was started. In 1938 the new alphabet based on Cyrillic letters was officially adopted, which remains the official alphabet for Kumyk up till today.

With the fall of the Soviet Union, with an increased prospect in international connection among Turkic peoples, a project to develop Latin alphabet again, but derived from modern Turkish orthography was undertaken. Several online publications, as well as many individuals using social media, have adopted this script as well.

=== Modern Cyrillic alphabet ===
Below is the Kumyk Cyrillic alphabet, adopted in 1938, and remaining in use in its original composition up till today.

А а [a]	Б б [b]	В в [β]/[v]	Г г [g]	Гъ гъ [ʁ]/[ɣ]	Гь гь [h]	Д д [d]	Е е ^{(1)} [je]/[e]
Ё ё ^{(2)} [ø]/[jø]/[jo]	Ж ж [dʒ]/[ʒ]	З з [z]	И и [i]	Й й [j]	К к [k]	Къ къ [q]/[ɢ]	Л л [l]
М м [m]	Н н [n]	Нг нг [ŋ]	О о [o]	Оь оь ^{(2)} [ø]	П п [p]	Р р [r]	С с [s]
Т т [t]	У у [u]/[w]	Уь уь ^{(3)} [y]	Ф ф [f]	Х х [x]/[χ]	Ц ц [ts]	Ч ч [tʃ]	Ш ш [ʃ]
Щ щ [ɕː]	Ъ ъ [ʔ]	Ы ы [ɯ]	Ь ь [◌ʲ]	Э э ^{(1)} [e]	Ю ю ^{(3)} [y]/[jy]/[ju]	Я я [ja]	

Notes

1. In native Kumyk words, as well as in Arabic and Persian loanwords, for words starting with vowel [e], the letter э is only used in word-initial position. In the middle of words, the letter е is used. If the letter е is used at the beginning of a word, it will have the sound [je].
2. The letter ё:
  - if used at the beginning of a word, in which there are other front vowels, or either г or к, it will have a [jø] sound. In other cases, if in the beginning of a word, it will have a [jo] sound.
  - To represent the vowel [ø] at the beginning of the word, the digraph оь is used.
  - if used in the middle or end of a word, and following a front vowel, it will also make a [jø] sound, if following a back vowel, it will make a [jo] sound.
  - if used in the middle of the word and following a consonant, it will have a [ø] sound.
1. The letter ю:
  - if used at the beginning of a word, in which there are other front vowels, or either г or к, it will have a [jy] sound. In other cases, if in the beginning of a word, it will have a [ju] sound.
  - To represent the vowel [y] at the beginning of the word, the digraph уь is used.
  - if used in the middle or end of a word, and following a front vowel, it will also make a [jy] sound, if following a back vowel, it will make a [ju] sound.
  - if used in the middle of the word and following a consonant, it will have a [y] sound.

Over the decades, proposals to further improve the Cyrillic script have been raised. For example, it was proposed to have the digraphs гъ, гь, къ, нг, оь/ё, and уь/ю with single letters ғ, һ, қ, ң, ө, and ү respectively; it was also to introduce a letter ў to represent the sound [β] and distinguish said sound with the sound [v] both written with the letter в; and to introduce a letter җ to represent the sound [dʒ] and distinguish said sound with the sound [ʒ] both written with the letter ж. None of these policies were adopted in Kumyk orthography.

=== Latin alphabet (1928–1938) ===
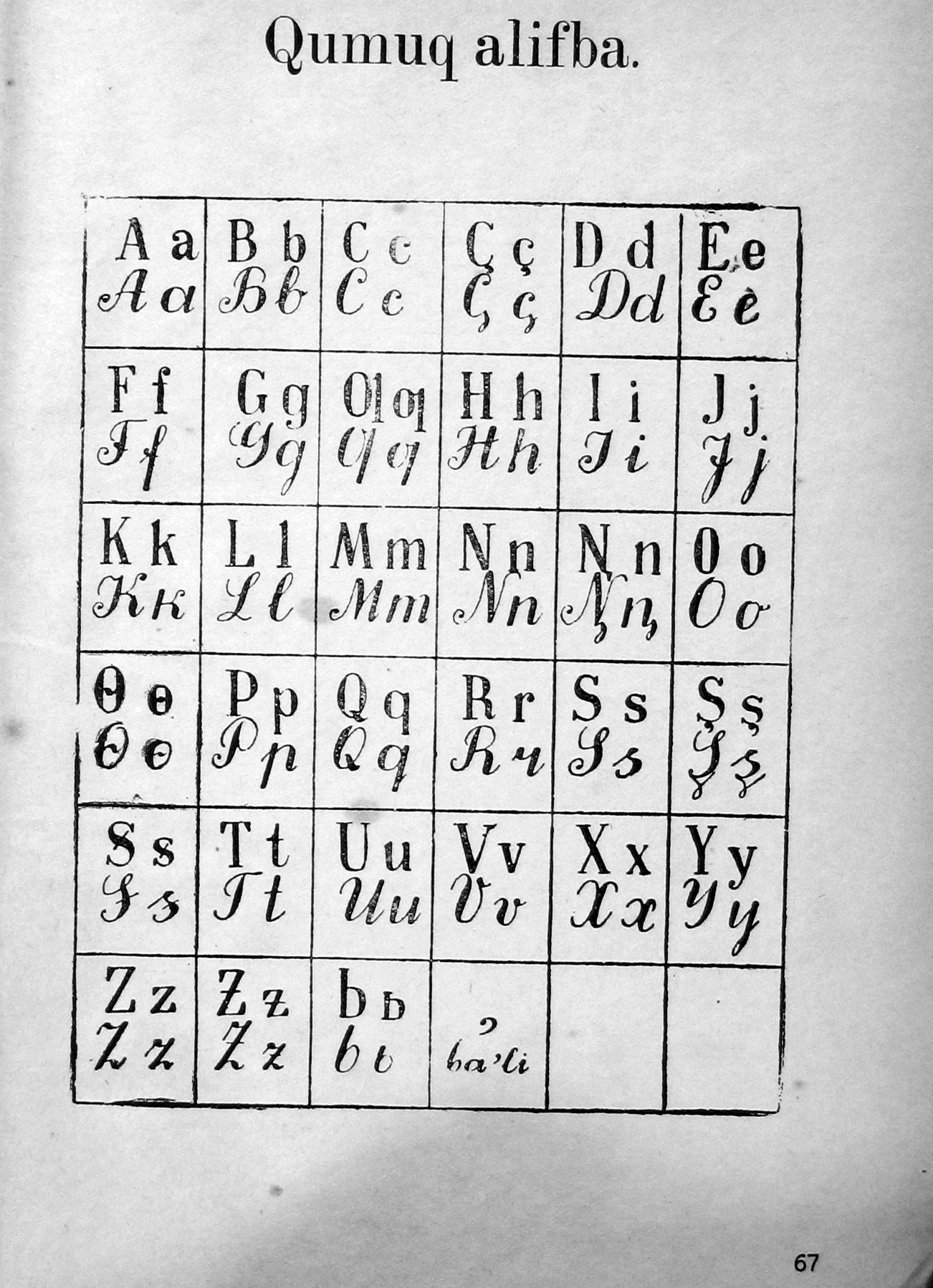
Kumyk alphabet from newly introduced Latin school book (1935).

Below table is the Latin alphabet for Kumyk, derived from Yañalif, and having an official status between 1928 and 1938.

A a [a]	B ʙ [b]	C c [tʃ]	Ç ç [dʒ]	D d [d]	E e [e]	F f [f]
G g [g]	Ƣ ƣ [ʁ]/[ɣ]	H h [h]	I i [i]	J j [j]	K k [k]	L l [l]
M m [m]	N n [n]	Ŋ ŋ [ŋ]	O o [o]	Ɵ ɵ [ø]	P p [p]	Q q [q]/[ɢ]
R r [r]	S s [s]	Ş ş [ʃ]	Ꞩ ꞩ [ts]	T t [t]	U u [u]	V v [v]
W w [w]	Y y [y]	X x [x]/[χ]	Z z [z]	Ƶ ƶ [ʒ]	Ь ь [ɯ]	’ [ʔ]

=== Latin alphabet project (1991) ===
Below table is the Latin alphabet developed for Kumyk since 1991, derived from modern Turkish orthography and the Common Turkic alphabet.

A a [a]	B b [b]	C c [dʒ]	Ç ç [tʃ]	D d [d]	E e [e]	F f [f]
G g [g]	Ğ ğ [ʁ]/[ɣ]	H h [h]	I ı [ɯ]	İ i [i]	J j [ʒ]	K k [k]
L l [l]	M m [m]	N n [n]	Ñ ñ [ŋ]	O o [o]	Ö ö [ø]	P p [p]
Q q [q]/[ɢ]	R r [r]	S s [s]	Ş ş [ʃ]	T t [t]	Ţ ţ [ts]	U u [u]
Ü ü [y]	V v [v]	W w [w]	Y y [j]	X x [x]/[χ]	Z z [z]	’ [ʔ]

=== Arabic alphabet (1921–1928) ===
Below table is the last standard iteration of the Perso-Arabic alphabet for Kumyk language, being compiled in 1921, and being the official alphabet until 1928:

آ / ـا [a]	ب [b]	پ [p]	ت [t]	ج [dʒ]	چ [tʃ]	خ [x]
د [d]	ر [r]	ز [z]	ژ [ʒ]	س [s]	ش [ʃ]	غ [ʁ]/[ɣ]
ف [f]	ق [q]/[ɢ]	ك [k]	ڭ [ŋ]	گ [g]	ل [l]	م [m]
ن [n]	او / و ^{(1)} [v]/[w]/[u]	و ^{(1)} [u]	اوٓ / وٓ [o]	اۏ / ۏ [y]	اۊ / ۊ [ø]	ھ [h]
اە ـە ە [e]	ایـ / ی^{(2)} [i]/[ɯ]	ی ^{(1)} [j]	ئ [ʔ]			

Notes

1. The letter و has been used for representing a variety of vowel and consonant sounds in Kumyk. With the orthographic reforms in Kumyk, by 1921, 3 unique new letters had been created with the use of dots or diacritics, each representing a different vowel. An unmarked letter و continued to be used as well, representing either the vowel [u], or the consonants [v]/[w]. The correct pronunciation can be determined from context. If the letter و is before or after a vowel letter (as all vowels were to be written as per the 1921 orthographic conventions), then the letter would be a consonant. Otherwise it would've been a vowel.
2. The letter ی has been used for representing a variety of vowel and consonant sounds in Kumyk. During the orthographic reforms in Kumyk, the letter ی was left unmarked in all cases. Thus, this single letter could represent either a consonant [j], or either the front or the back vowels [i] and [ɯ] respectively.
  - If the letter ی is before or after a vowel letter (as all vowels were to be written as per the 1921 orthographic conventions), then the letter would be a consonant.
  - Otherswise, the vowel pronunciation of the letter ی can be determined by having an understanding of the vowel harmony and palatal harmony rules that exist in Kumyk as typical of languages of the Turkic family. If the letter ی is in a word with front vowels اە ـە ە [e], اۏ / ۏ [y], or اۊ / ۊ [ø], or with the two corresponding consonants ك [k] or گ, the letter ی will be a front vowel and pronounced as [i].
  - If the letter ی is in a word with back vowels آ / ـا [a], او / و [u], or اوٓ / وٓ [o], or with the two corresponding consonants ق [ɢ~q] or غ [ʁ~ɣ], the letter ی will be a back vowel and pronounced as [ɯ].

=== Comparison chart ===
Compiled from:

Arabic alphabet 1921—1928	Latin 1928—1938	Cyrillic c 1938	Latin project 1991	IPA
آ ـا	A a	А а	A a, Ä ä	/a/, /æ/
ب	B ʙ	Б б	B b	/b/
و	V v	В в	V v, W w	/v/, /w/
گ	G g	Г г	G g	/g/
غ	Ƣ ƣ	Гъ гъ	Ğ ğ	/ʁ~ɣ/
ھ	H h	Гь гь	H h	/h/
د	D d	Д д	D d	/d/
یە / ـە	Je je, e	Е е	Ye ye, E e	
اۊ / ـۊ / یۊ	Ɵ ɵ	Ё ё	Yo yo, Ö ö	
ج, ژ	Ƶ ƶ, Ç ç	Ж ж	C c, J j	/d͡ʒ/, /ʒ/
ز	Z z	З з	Z z	/z/
ایـ‌ / ی	I i	И и	İ i	/i/
ی	J j	Й й	Y y	/j/
ك	K k	К к	K k	/k/
ق	Q q	Къ къ	Q q	/q/
ل	L l	Л л	L l	/l/
م	M m	М м	M m	/m/
ن	N n	Н н	N n	/n/
ڭ	Ꞑ ꞑ	Нг нг	Ñ ñ	/ŋ/
اوٓ / وٓ	O o	О о	O o	/o/
اۊ / ۊ	Ɵ ɵ	Оь оь	Ö ö	/ø/
پ	P p	П п	P p	/p/
ر	R r	Р р	R r	/r/
س	S s	С с	S s	/s/
ت	T t	Т т	T t	/t/
او / و	U u	У у	U u	/u/
اۏ / ۏ	Y y	Уь уь	Ü ü	/y/
ف	F f	Ф ф	F f	/f/
خ	X x	Х х	X x	/x/
تس	S̷ s̷	Ц ц	Ts ts	
چ	C c	Ч ч	Ç ç	/t͡ʃ/
ش	Ş ş	Ш ш	Ş ş	/ʃ/
		Щ щ	Şç şç	
ئ	'	Ъ ъ	'	/ʔ/, /ʕ/
ایـ / ی	Ь ь	Ы ы	I ı	/ɯ/
		Ь ь		
اه / ه	E e	Э э	E e	/e/, /æ/
اۏ / ـۏ / یۏ	Ju ju	Ю ю	Yu yu, Ü ü	
یا	Ja ja	Я я	Ya ya, Ä ä	/æ/

== Literature and media ==
Irchi Kazak (Ийрчы Къазакъ Yırçı Qazaq; born 1839) is usually considered to be the greatest poet of the Kumyk language. The first regular Kumyk newspapers and magazines appeared in 1917–18 under the editorship of Kumyk poet, writer, translator, and theatre figure Temirbolat Biybolatov (Temirbolat Biybolat). Currently, the newspaper Ёлдаш (Yoldash, "Companion"), the successor of the Soviet-era Ленин ёлу (Lenin yolu, "Lenin's Path"), prints around 5,000 copies 3 times a week.

The Kumyk language was learned by Russian classical authors such as Leo Tolstoy and Mikhail Lermontov, both of whom served in the Caucasus. The language is present in such works of Tolstoy as "The Raid", The Cossacks, and Hadji Murat, in Lermontov's "A Hero of Our Time", and in Bestuzhev-Marlinsky's "Molla-nur" and "Ammalat-bek".

== Sample text ==
Below is the translation of the Christian Lord's Prayer in Kumyk, in a variety of scripts.

In Cyrillic	Transliteration	Translation
Гьей кёклердеги Атабыз! Инсанлар Сени сыйлы атынгны гьюрметлесин дагъы. Сени гьакимлигинг токъташсын дагъы. Кёкде йимик, ерде де Сени айтгъанынг болсун дагъы. Бугюн бизге гюнлюк азыгъыбызны бер. Бизин гюнагьларыбыздан геч! Бизге яманлыкъ этгенлерден барындан да биз де гечебиз. Бизин артыкъ сынавлагъа салма, иблисден де бизин сакъла. Амин!	Hej köklerdegi Atabyz! Insanlar Seni cyjly atyŋny hürmetlesin daǧy. Seni hakimligiŋ toqtašsyn daǧy. Kökde jimik, erde de seni ajtǧanyŋ bolsun daǧy. Bugün bizge günlük azyǧybyzny ber. Bizin günahlarybyzdan geč! Bizge jamanlyq etgenlerden baryndan da biz de gečbiz. Bizin artyq synawlarǧa salma, iblisden de bizin saqla. Amin!	Our Father, Who art in heaven, hallowed be Thy name; Thy kingdom come; Thy will be done on earth as it is in heaven. Give us this day our daily bread; and forgive us our trespasses as we forgive those who trespass against us; and lead us not into temptation, but deliver us from evil. Amen!
Latin Project (1991-)	Latin Yañalif (1928-1938)	Arabic Alphabet (1921-1928)
Hey köklerdegi Atabız! İnsanlar Seni sıylı atıñnı hürmetlesin dağı. Seni hakimligiñ toqtaşsın dağı. Kökde yimik, erde de seni aytğanıñ bolsun dağı. Bugün bizge günlük azığıbıznı ber. Bizin günahlarıbızdan geç! Bizge yamanlıq etgenlerden barından da biz de geçebiz. Bizin artıq sınawlarğa salma, iblisden de bizin saqla. Amin!	Hej kɵklerdegi Ataʙьz! Insanlar seni sьjlь atьꞑnь hyrmetlesin daƣь. Seni hakimligiꞑ toqtaşsьn daƣь. Kɵkde jimik, erde de seni aytƣanьꞑ ʙolsun daƣь. Bugyn ʙizge gynlyk azьƣьʙьznь ʙer. Bizin gynahlarьʙьzdan gec! Bizge jamanlьq etgenlerden ʙarьndan da ʙiz de geceʙiz. Bizin artьq sьnavlaƣa salma, iʙlisden de ʙizin saqla. Amin!	ھەی كۊكلەردەگی آتابیز! اینسانلار سەنی سییلی آتیڭنی ھۏرمەتلەسین داغی. سەنی ھاكیملیگیڭ توٓقتاشسین داغی. كۊكدە ییمیك، اەردە دە سەنی آیتغانیڭ بوٓلسون داغی. بوگۏن بیزگە گۏنلۏك آزیغیبیزنی بەر. بیزین گۏناھلاریبیزدان گەچ! بیزگە یامانلیق اەتگەنلەردەن بارندان دا بیز دە گەچەبیز. بیزین آرتیق سیناولارغا سالما، ایبلیسدەن ده بیزین ساقلا. آمین!

== Bibliography ==
- Saodat Doniyorova and Toshtemirov Qahramonil. Parlons Koumyk. Paris: L'Harmattan, 2004. ISBN 2-7475-6447-9.
