= Khasavyurtovsky District =

Khasavyurtovsky District Хасавюртовский район (Russian)
- District

Other transcription(s)
  - Avar: Хасавхъала мухъ
  - Kumyk: Хасавюрт якъ
  - Chechen: Хаси-Эвлан кӀошт
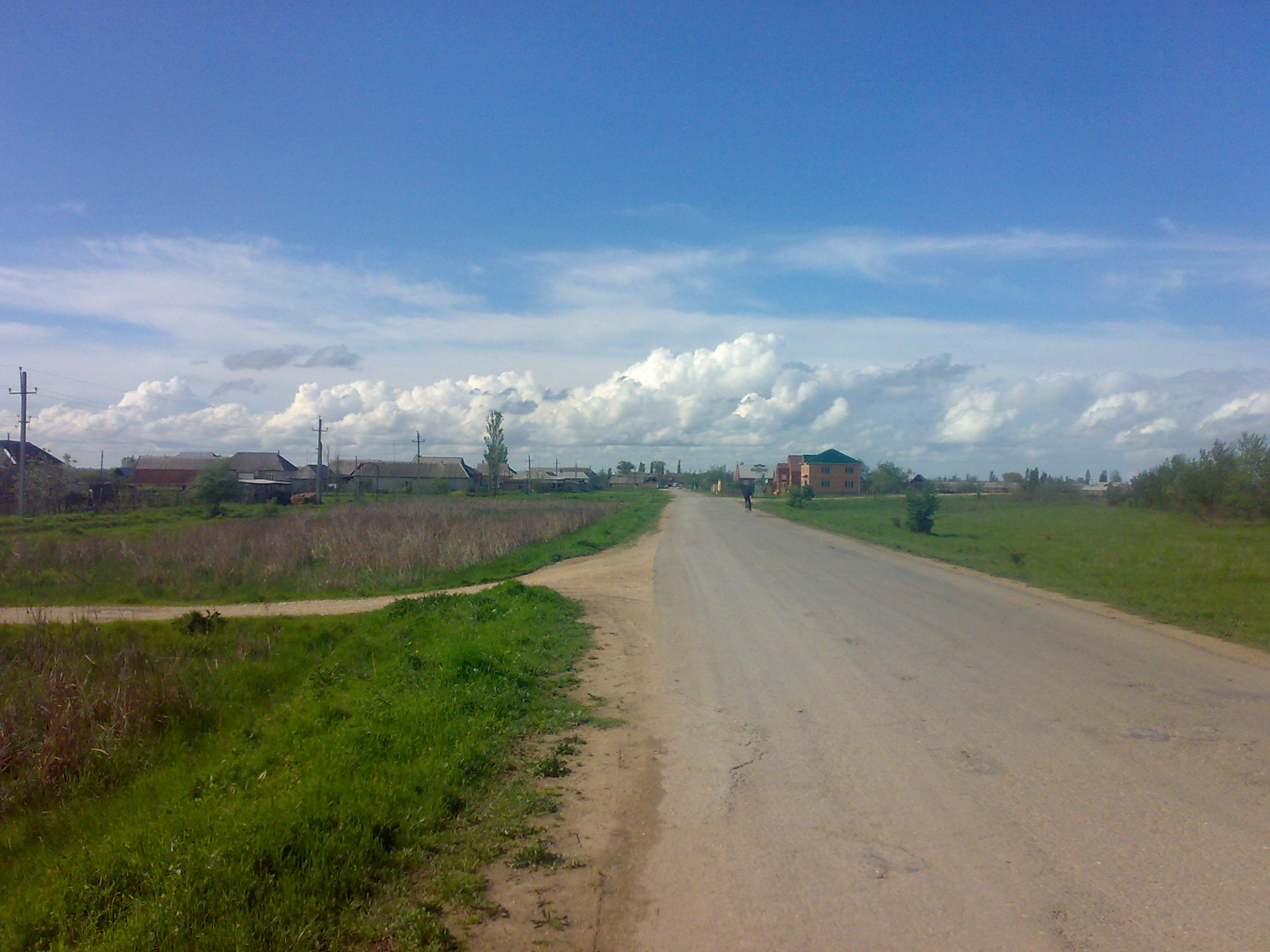
- The selo of Kandauraul in Khasavyurtovsky District

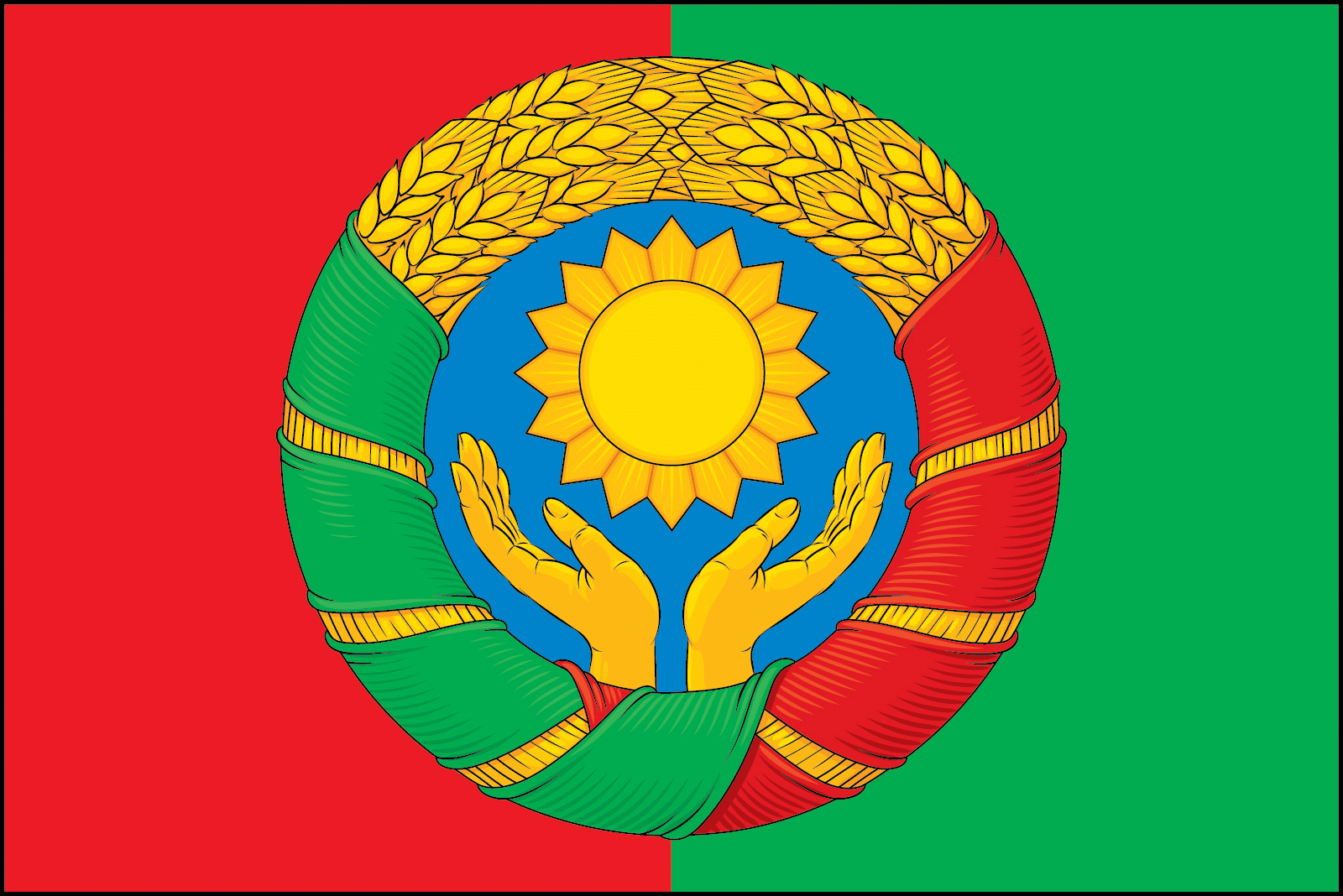
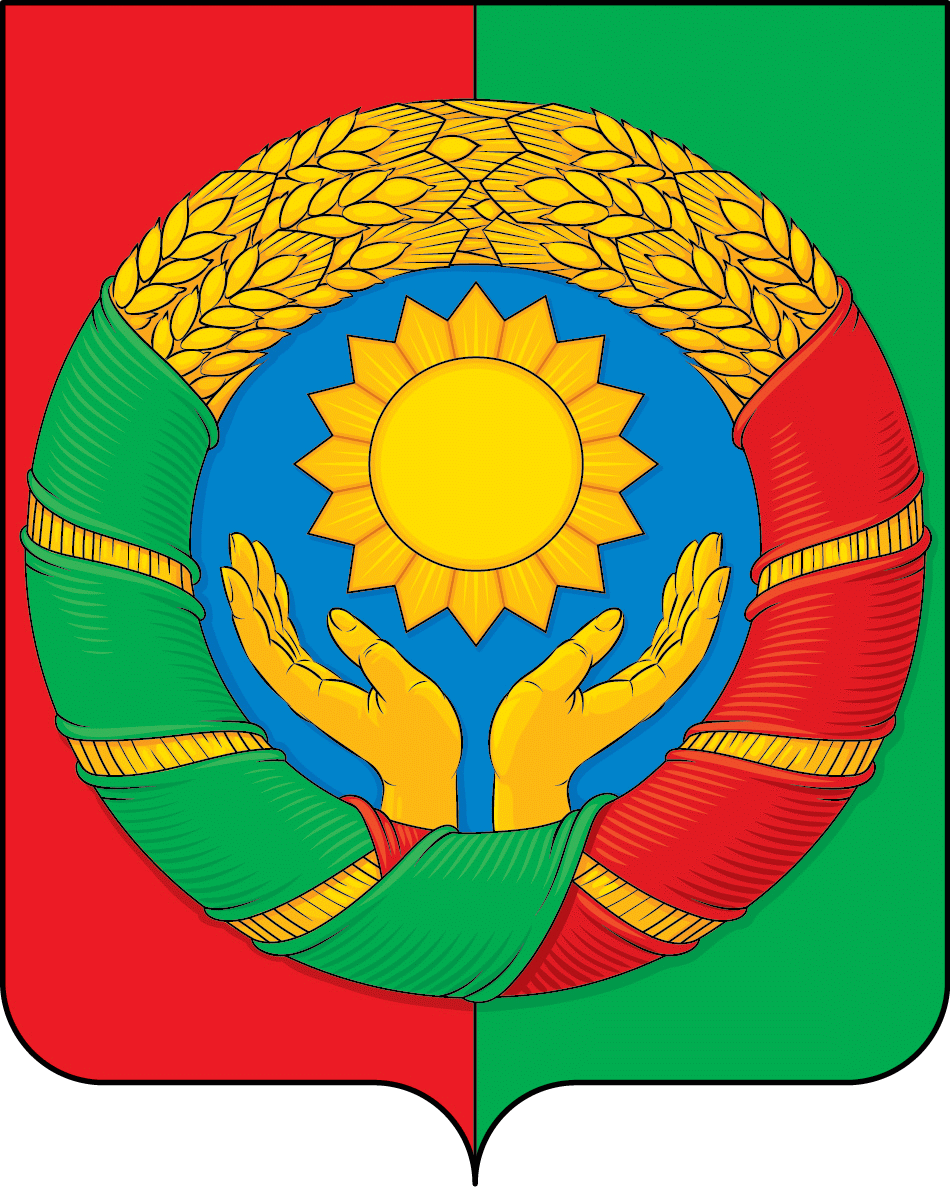
- Flag Coat of arms
- Location of Khasavyurtovsky District in the Republic of Dagestan
- Coordinates: 43°15′N 46°35′E
- Country: Russia
- Federal subject: Republic of Dagestan
- Established: 1929
- Administrative center: Khasavyurt

Area
  - Total: 1,425.0 km^{2} (550.2 sq mi)

Population (2010 Census)
  - Total: 141,232
  - Density: 99.110/km^{2} (256.69/sq mi)
  - Urban: 0%
  - Rural: 100%

Administrative structure
  - Administrative divisions: 13 Selsoviets
  - Inhabited localities: 58 rural localities

Municipal structure
  - Municipally incorporated as: Khasavyurtovsky Municipal District
  - Municipal divisions: 0 urban settlements, 42 rural settlements
- Time zone: UTC+3 (MSK)
- OKTMO ID: 82654000
- Website: http://www.khasrayon.ru

Population of Khasavyurtovsky District
- 2010 Census: 141,232
- 2002 Census: 125,454
- 1989 Census: 93,422
- 1979 Census: 84,467

Khasavyurtovsky District (Russian: Хасавю́ртовский райо́н; Avar: Хасавхъала мухъ; Kumyk: Хасавюрт якъ, Xasavürt yaq; Chechen: Хаси-Эвлан кӀошт, Xasi-Evlan khioşt) is an administrative and municipal district (raion), one of the forty-one in the Republic of Dagestan, Russia. It is located in the west of the republic. The area of the district is 1,425.0 square kilometers (550.2 sq mi). Its administrative center is the city of Khasavyurt (which is not administratively a part of the district). As of the 2010 Census, the total population of the district was 141,232.

== Administrative and municipal status ==
Within the framework of administrative divisions, Khasavyurtovsky District is one of the forty-one in the republic. It is divided into thirteen selsoviets, comprising fifty-eight rural localities. The city of Khasavyurt serves as its administrative center, despite being incorporated separately as an administrative unit with the status equal to that of the districts.

As a municipal division, the district is incorporated as Khasavyurtovsky Municipal District. Its thirteen selsoviets are incorporated as forty-two rural settlements within the municipal district. The City of Khasavyurt is incorporated separately from the district as Khasavyurt Urban Okrug, but serves as the administrative center of the municipal district as well.

== Demographics ==
As of the 2010 Census, the main ethnic groups are:

- Avars: 31.4%
- Kumyks: 30.7%
- Chechens: 25.8%
- Dargins: 5.4%
- Lezgians: 5.3%
- Laks: 0.2%
- Russians: 0.2%
