= Khasavyurt =

City in Dagestan, Russia

Khasavyurt Хасавюрт
- City
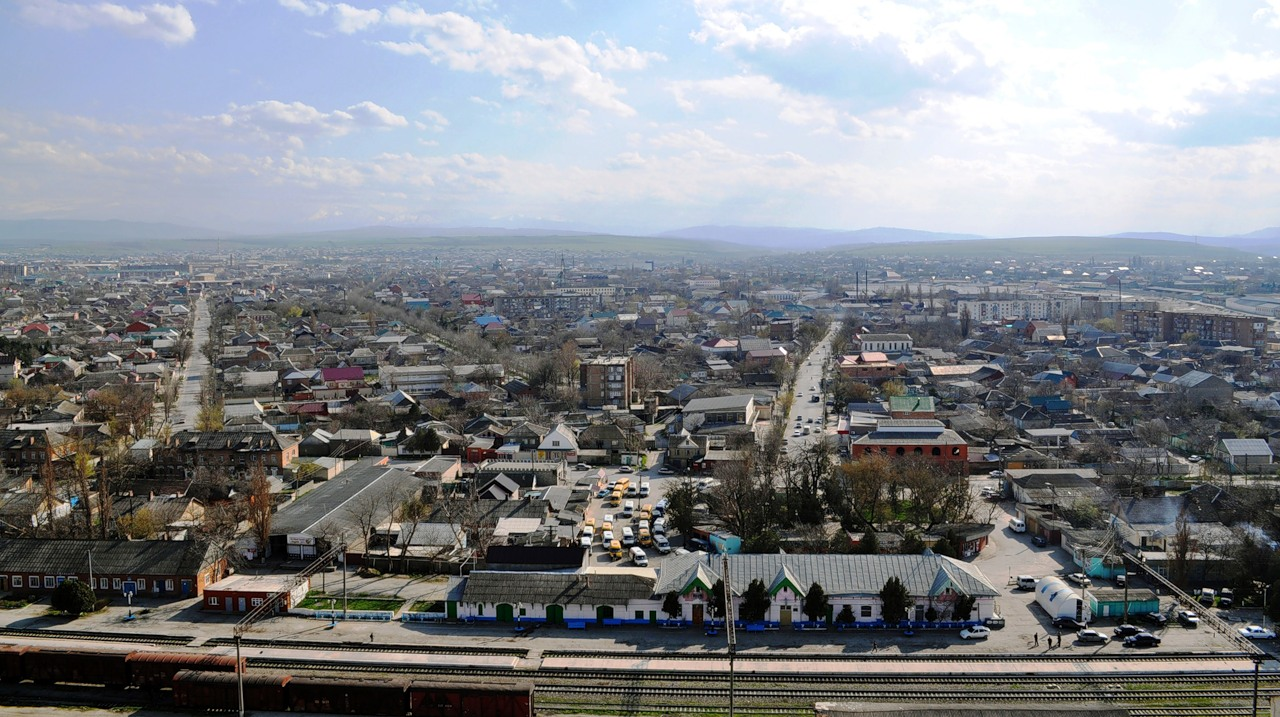
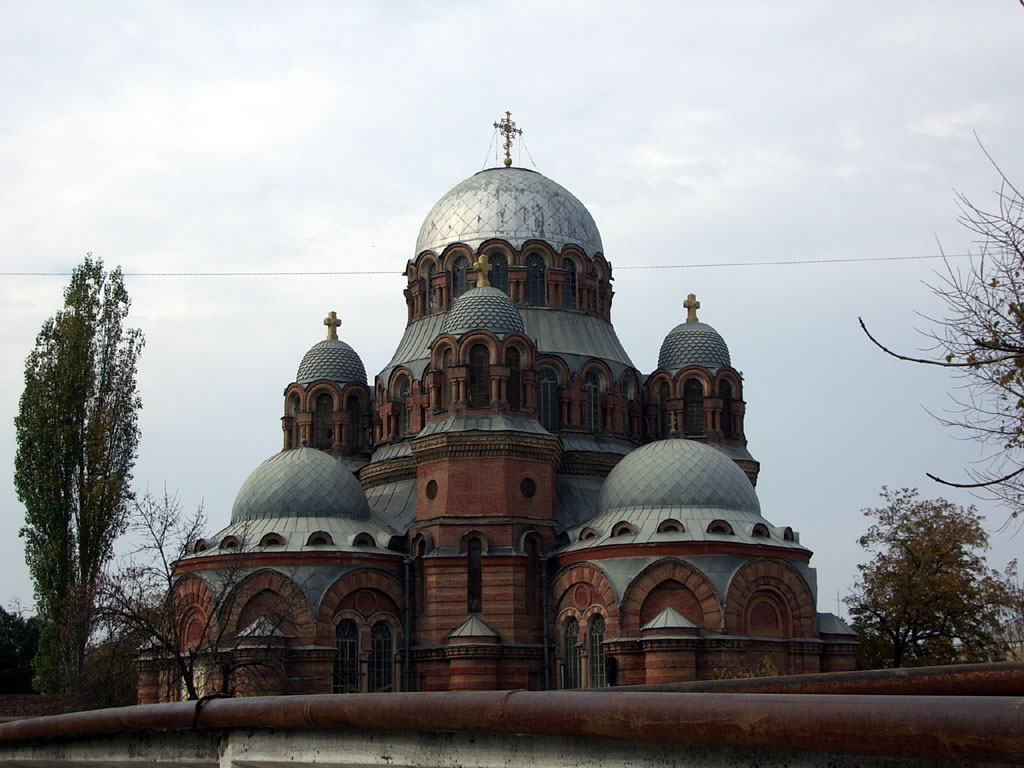
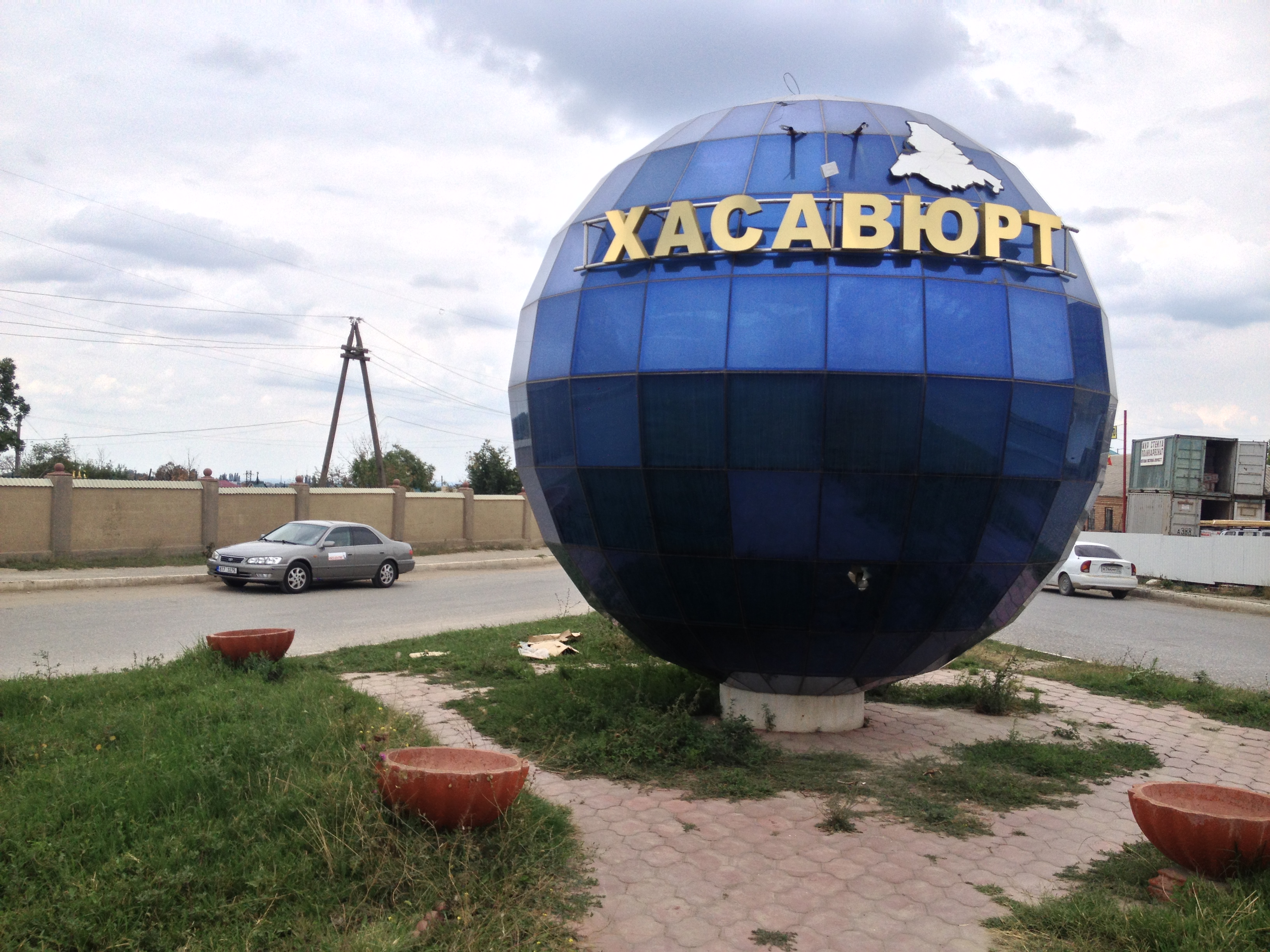
- View over Khasavyurt Cathedral of Our Lady of the Sign Entrance Sign

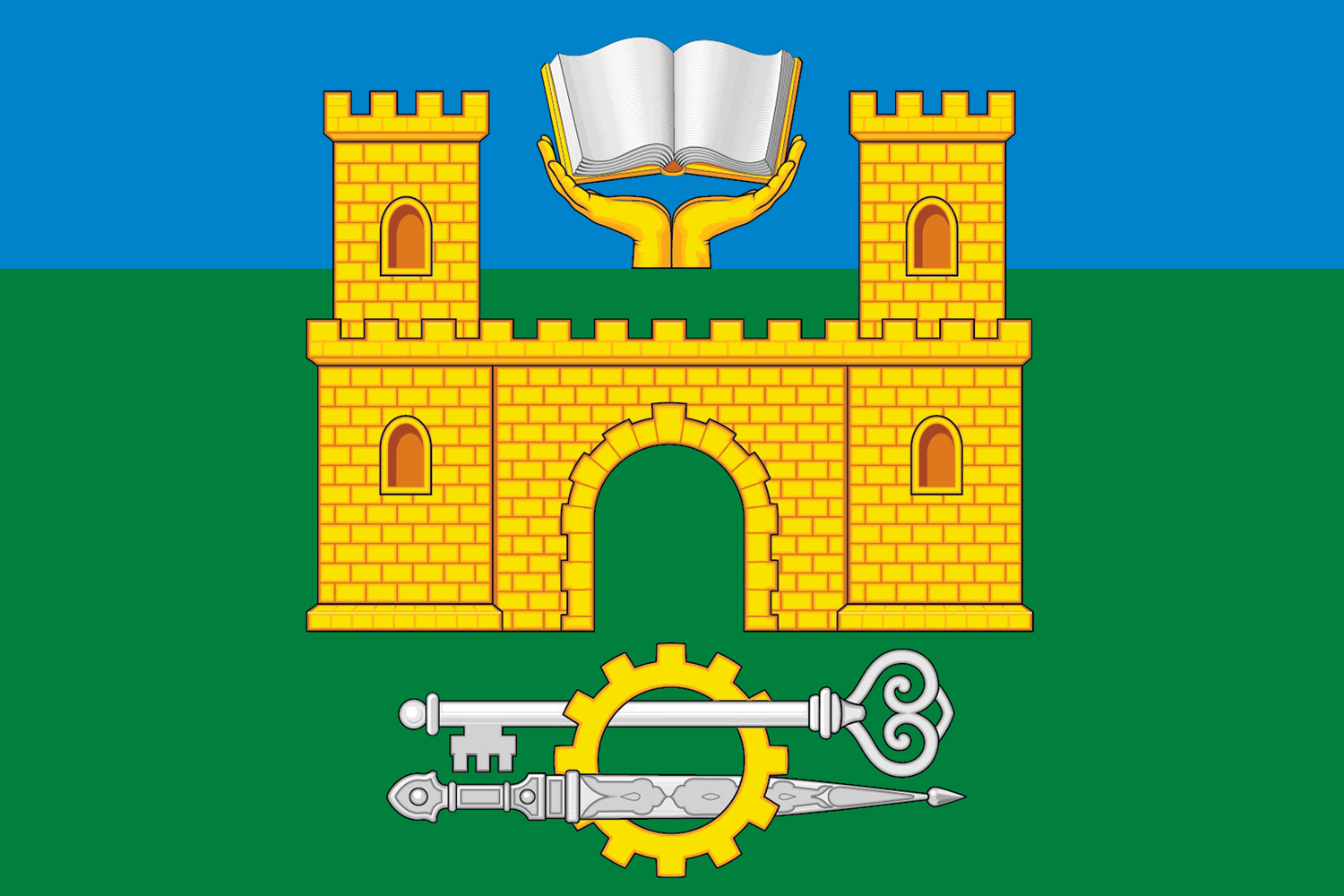
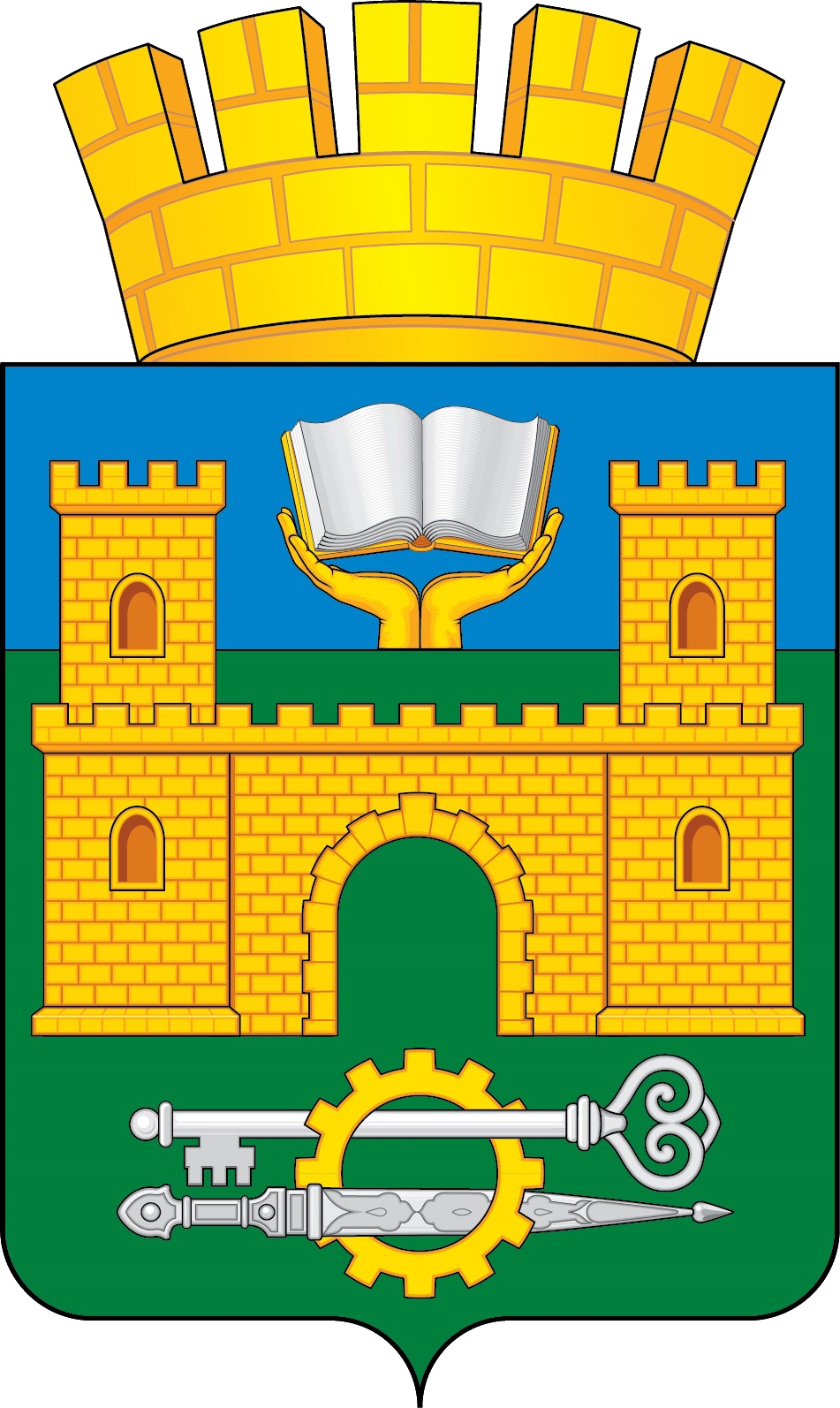
- Flag Coat of arms
- Interactive map of Khasavyurt
- Location of Khasavyurt Khasavyurt (Republic of Dagestan)
- Coordinates: 43°15′N 46°35′E
- Country: Russia
- Federal subject: Dagestan
- Founded: 1846
- City status since: 1931

Government
  - Head: S. D. Ukhmanov
- Elevation: 130 m (430 ft)

Population (2010 Census)
  - Total: 131,187
  - Estimate (2021): 155,144 (+18.3%)
  - Rank: 126th in 2010

Administrative status
  - Subordinated to: City of Khasavyurt
  - Capital of: Khasavyurtovsky District, City of Khasavyurt

Municipal status
  - Urban okrug: Khasavyurt Urban Okrug
  - Capital of: Khasavyurt Urban Okrug, Khasavyurtovsky Municipal District
- Time zone: UTC+3 (MSK)
- Postal code: 368000—368009
- Dialing code: +7 87231
- OKTMO ID: 82735000001
- Website: xacavurt.ru

Khasavyurt (Note: Avar: Хасавюрт; Aghul: Хасавюрт; Azerbaijani: Xasavyurt; Chechen: Хаси-Эвла, romanized: Khasi-Ēvla; Dargwa: Хасавюрт; Kumyk: Хасав-юрт, romanized: Xasaw-yurt; Lak: Хасавюрт; Lezgian: Хасавюрт; Nogai: Хасавюрт, romanized: Xasawyurt; Rutul: Хасавюрт; Tabassaran: Хасавюрт; Muslim Tat: Хасавюрт; Tsakhur: Хасавюрт) is a city in Dagestan, Russia. Population: 155,144 (2021 census); 131,187 (2010 census); 121,817 (2002 census); 70,514 (1989 Soviet census).

== History ==
It was founded in 1846 and granted town status in 1931. During the Russian Empire, the settlement was the administrative capital of the Khasavyurtovsky Okrug of the Terek Oblast.

In 1996, the agreement was signed in Khasavyurt between the Russian Federation and the Chechen Republic of Ichkeria following the First Chechen War, known as Khasavyurt Accord.

On August 19, 2012, six police officers were killed and eight people injured at two gun and bomb attacks in the city. The town has thousands of Salafis. In December 2016, the Russian authorities reported the existence of the Khasavyurt Group, allegedly linked to the Islamic State and a flareup of incidents and skirmishes between the police and local militants in and around the city.

== Administrative and municipal status ==
Within the framework of administrative divisions, Khasavyurt serves as the administrative center of Khasavyurtovsky District, even though it is not a part of it. As an administrative division, it is incorporated separately as the City of Khasavyurt—an administrative unit with the status equal to that of the districts. As a municipal division, the City of Khasavyurt is incorporated as Khasavyurt Urban Okrug.

=== Local government ===
The Assembly of Deputies consists of 25 deputies elected by residents for a period of 5 years. The current 6th convocation was elected in the 2018 Russian elections. The elections were held according to a proportional system in a single district. Only five parties were registered: United Russia, the Communist Party of the Russian Federation, A Just Russia, the Liberal Democratic Party of Russia, and the Labor Party of Russia. 4 parties entered the Assembly of Deputies: United Russia - 17 seats (63.68%), CPRF - 4 seats (17.95%), Labor Party of Russia - 2 (7.61%), and A Just Russia - 2 (7.58%). The LDPR list received 1.72% of the votes and received no mandates. Zagit-Salim Dadayev (United Russia) was re-elected as chairman of the 6th convocation.

The 5th convocation was elected on 8 September 2013. From among the deputies, the current head, Saygidpasha Umakhanov, was re-elected to the post of head of the municipality. In June 2015, a new charter for the urban district of the city of Khasavyurt was adopted. In September 2015, Umakhanov resigned as the head of the city and, on the same day, was elected chairman of the city assembly of deputies, and the duties of the head of the city were entrusted to the head of the Khasavyurt administration, Arslan Arslanov.

== Demographics ==
Ethnic groups (2021 census):

- Avars (47.9%)
- Kumyks (23.6%)
- Chechens (22.9%)
- Dargins (1.8%)
- Laks (1.5%)
- Lezgins (0.9%)
- Russians (0.8%)

== Geography ==
=== Climate ===
Khasavyurt has a humid continental climate with hot summers and cold winters. (Köppen climate classification: Dfa).

Climate data for Khasavyurt
Month	Jan	Feb	Mar	Apr	May	Jun	Jul	Aug	Sep	Oct	Nov	Dec	Year
Mean daily maximum °C (°F)	1.4 (34.5)	2.7 (36.9)	7.7 (45.9)	16.0 (60.8)	22.5 (72.5)	27.0 (80.6)	29.7 (85.5)	28.9 (84.0)	23.6 (74.5)	16.5 (61.7)	9.3 (48.7)	4.0 (39.2)	15.8 (60.4)
Daily mean °C (°F)	−1.8 (28.8)	−0.7 (30.7)	3.8 (38.8)	10.9 (51.6)	17.3 (63.1)	21.8 (71.2)	24.6 (76.3)	23.8 (74.8)	18.6 (65.5)	12.1 (53.8)	5.9 (42.6)	1.1 (34.0)	11.5 (52.6)
Mean daily minimum °C (°F)	−5.0 (23.0)	−4.1 (24.6)	0.0 (32.0)	5.9 (42.6)	12.2 (54.0)	16.6 (61.9)	19.5 (67.1)	18.8 (65.8)	13.7 (56.7)	7.8 (46.0)	2.6 (36.7)	−1.8 (28.8)	7.2 (44.9)
Average precipitation mm (inches)	20 (0.8)	23 (0.9)	22 (0.9)	32 (1.3)	51 (2.0)	60 (2.4)	43 (1.7)	35 (1.4)	40 (1.6)	36 (1.4)	30 (1.2)	22 (0.9)	414 (16.5)
Source: Climate-Data.org

Historical population
Year	Pop.	±%
1897	5,000	—
1926	6,888	+37.8%
1939	23,000	+233.9%
1959	34,194	+48.7%
1970	54,255	+58.7%
1979	65,114	+20.0%
1989	70,514	+8.3%
2002	121,817	+72.8%
2010	131,187	+7.7%
2021	155,144	+18.3%
Source: Census data

== Religion ==
The overwhelming majority of the city's residents are Sunni Muslim.

There were 4 churches in the city. Only one has survived to this day – the Cathedral of Our Lady of the Sign. It is the largest Orthodox church in the North Caucasus.

The city also had one domed synagogue.

There are about 19 large mosques in Khasavyurt.

== Economy ==
The main local industries are food processing, brick making and garment making.

== Notable people ==
- Imam Alimsultanov, Chechen bard
- Arsen Akayev, Former professional football player, coach
- Adam Batirov, Russian-Bahraini Olympic freestyle wrestler
- Mavlet Batirov, Olympic freestyle wrestler
- Artur Beterbiev, Boxer
- Nassourdine Imavov, MMA fighter
- Viktoriya Isakova, Actress
- Amaldan Kukullu (1935–2000), Soviet/Russian poet, storyteller, folklorist
- Zabit Magomedsharipov, MMA fighter
- Ramazan Sahin, Olympic freestyle wrestler
- Adam Saitiev, Olympic freestyle wrestler
- Buvaisar Saitiev, Olympic freestyle wrestler
- Zaur Uguev, Olympic freestyle wrestler
- Murad Umakhanov, Olympic freestyle wrestler
- Elmadi Zhabrailov (born 1965), freestyle wrestler
- Musa Murtazaliev, freestyle wrestler representing Armenia
- Dzhamal Otarsultanov, Olympic freestyle wrestler

== See also ==
- Khasavyurt Accord, a 1996 peace agreement ending the First Chechen War
- Cathedral of Our Lady of the Sign
- History of the Jews in Khasavyurt
