= Zumrud Khanmagomedova =

Tabasaran poet and teacher

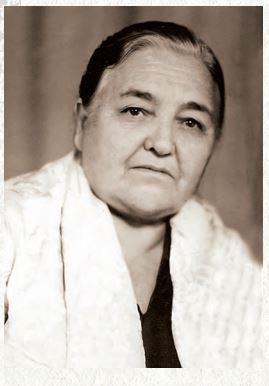
- Born: 22 March 1915; Kondik village, Khivsky District of the Dagestan
- Died: 2001 (aged 85–86); Derbend city, Dagestan, Russia
- Education: Derbend School of Teachers
- Occupations: Poet, teacher
- Relatives: Gadzhi-Kurban (father); Sekinat (mother)
- Writing career
- Language: Tabasaran
- Genre: Lyric poetry

Zumrud Khanmagomedova (Tabasaran: Ханмягьмадова Зумруд, 1915–2001) was the first Tabasaran woman who received higher education, as well as the first Tabasaran woman poet and the great-granddaughter of the scientist-historian of Dagestan Hasan Alkadari.

== Biography ==
Zumrud Khanmagomedova was born in 1915 in the village of Kondik in the Khivsky District of the Republic of Dagestan. Her father Gadzhi-Kurban (1877–1938) was a Russian officer, arrested in 1937 and shot in 1938, but posthumously rehabilitated. Her elder brother Asadulla Khanmagomedov (1911–1974) was also a writer, mathematician, and co-author of the Tabasaran alphabet based on the Cyrillic script (1938). Her younger brother was Beydullah Khanmagomedov (1927–1997), a doctor of philology and well-known specialist in the Tabasaran language.

After the dissolution of the carpet technical school, at the age of 19, she entered the Derbent school of teachers, after which she worked at the school of Khiv as a primary school teacher, in which she was entrusted with teaching mathematics and physics. During World War II, Zumrud entered the Pedagogical Institute in the city of Makhachkala at the Faculty of physics and mathematics, to which she successfully graduated in 1948. After graduation, she returned to school as a teacher of mathematics, physics, and astronomy. In 1953 she returned to work at the pedagogical college in the city of Derbent, where she worked until her retirement.

She died in 2001 at the age of 86.

== Sources ==
- Knizhna︠i︡a letopisʹ (Book chronicle): Osnovnoĭ vypusk. Kniga. 1992. p. 94.
- Bulgayeva, Sulgiyat (2021). Magazine "Women of Dagestan": Physicist-lyricist Zumrud Khanmagomedova, No. 4.
