= Khursatil =

Khursatil Хурсатиль
- Selo
- Location within Republic of Dagestan Location within Russia
- Coordinates: 41°51′N 47°47′E
- Country: Russia
- Region: Republic of Dagestan
- District: Khasavyurtovsky District
- Time zone: UTC+3:00

Khursatil (Russian: Хурсатиль) is a rural locality (a selo) in Urginsky Selsoviet, Khivsky District, Republic of Dagestan, Russia. Population: 43 (2010 census); 49 (2002 census); 64 (1989 Soviet census).

== Geography ==
Khursatil is located 24 km northwest of Khiv (the district's administrative centre) by road. Atrik is the nearest rural locality.
