= Kontsil =

Kontsil Конциль
- Settlement
- Location within Republic of Dagestan Location within Russia
- Coordinates: 41°45′N 48°01′E
- Country: Russia
- Region: Republic of Dagestan
- District: Khivsky District
- Time zone: UTC+3:00

Kontsil (Russian: Конциль) is a rural locality (a settlement) and the administrative center of Kontsilsky Selsoviet, Khivsky District, Republic of Dagestan, Russia. Population: 428 (2010 census); 467 (2002 census); 392 (1989 Soviet census). There are 4 streets in this settlement.

== Geography ==
It is located 7 km from Khiv (the district's administrative centre), 143 km from Makhachkala (capital of Dagestan) and 1,780 km from Moscow. Asakent is the nearest rural locality.
