= Chere, Republic of Dagestan =

Chere Чере
- Selo
- Location within Republic of Dagestan Location within Russia
- Coordinates: 41°48′N 48°02′E
- Country: Russia
- Region: Republic of Dagestan
- District: Khivsky District
- Time zone: UTC+3:00

Chere (Russian: Чере) is a rural locality (a selo) in Mezhgyulsky Selsoviet, Khivsky District, Republic of Dagestan, Russia. Population: 313 (2010 census); 247 (2002 census); 252 (1989 Soviet census). There is 1 street in this selo.

== Geography ==
It is located 11 km from Khiv (the district's administrative centre), 137 km from Makhachkala (capital of Dagestan) and 1,775 km from Moscow. Mezhgyul is the nearest rural locality.
