= Chuvek =

Chuvek Чувек
- Selo
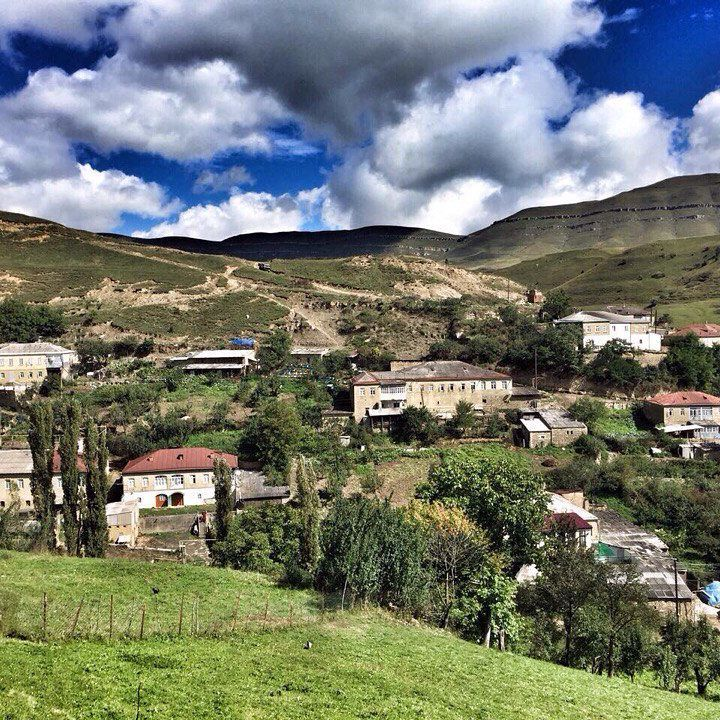

- Location within Republic of Dagestan Location within Russia
- Coordinates: 41°48′N 47°54′E
- Country: Russia
- Region: Republic of Dagestan
- District: Khivsky District
- Time zone: UTC+3:00

Chuvek (Russian: Чувек) is a rural locality (a selo) and the administrative center of Chuveksky Selsoviet, Khivsky District, Republic of Dagestan, Russia. Population: 752 (2010 census); 619 (2002 census); 529 (1989 Soviet census). There are 2 streets in this selo.

== Geography ==
Chuvek is located 6 km (3.7 mi) from Khiv (the district's administrative centre), 134 km (83 mi) from Makhachkala (capital of Dagestan) and 1,770 km (1,100 mi) from Moscow. Kondik is the nearest rural locality.
