= Ashaga-Tsinit =

Ashaga-Tsinit Ашага-Цинит Агъа-ЦIинитI
- Selo
- Location within Republic of Dagestan Location within Russia
- Coordinates: 41°43′N 48°00′E
- Country: Russia
- Region: Republic of Dagestan
- District: Khasavyurtovsky District
- Time zone: UTC+3:00

Ashaga-Tsinit (Russian: Ашага-Цинит; Lezgian: Агъа-ЦIинитI) is a rural locality (a selo) in Ashaga-Arkhitsky Selsoviet, Khivsky District, Republic of Dagestan, Russia. Population: 789 (2010 census); 695 (2002 census); 528 (1989 Soviet census).

== Geography ==
Ashaga-Tsinit is located 9 km southeast of Khiv (the district's administrative centre) by road. Ashaga-Arkhit is the nearest rural locality.
