= Ashaga-Arkhit =

Ashaga-Arkhit Ашага-Архит Агъа-АрхитI
- Selo
- Location within Republic of Dagestan Location within Russia
- Coordinates: 41°44′N 47°58′E
- Country: Russia
- Region: Republic of Dagestan
- District: Khasavyurtovsky District
- Time zone: UTC+3:00

Ashaga-Arkhit (Russian: Ашага-Архит; Lezgian: Агъа-АрхитI) is a rural locality (a selo) and the administrative centre of Ashaga-Arkhitsky Selsoviet, Khivsky District, Republic of Dagestan, Russia. Population: 808 (2010 census); 686 (2002 census); 554 (1989 Soviet census). There are 21 streets.

== Geography ==
Ashaga-Arkhit is located 6 km southeast of Khiv (the district's administrative centre) by road. Yukhari-Arkhit is the nearest rural locality.
