= Garig, Republic of Dagestan =

Garig Гариг Гварихъ
- Selo
- Location within Republic of Dagestan Location within Russia
- Coordinates: 41°52′N 47°52′E
- Country: Russia
- Region: Republic of Dagestan
- District: Khasavyurtovsky District
- Time zone: UTC+3:00

Garig (Russian: Гариг; Tabassaran: Гварихъ) is a rural locality (a selo) in Lyakhlinsky Selsoviet, Khivsky District, Republic of Dagestan, Russia. Population: 33 (2010 census); 33 (2002 census); 34 (1989 Soviet census).

== Geography ==
Garig is located 24 km north of Khiv (the district's administrative centre) by road. Lyakhlya is the nearest rural locality.
