= Zaza, Republic of Dagestan =

Zaza Заза Цацархуьр
- Selo
- Location within Republic of Dagestan Location within Russia
- Coordinates: 41°46′N 48°02′E
- Country: Russia
- Region: Republic of Dagestan
- District: Khasavyurtovsky District
- Time zone: UTC+3:00

Zaza (Russian: Заза; Lezgian: Цацархуьр) is a rural locality (a selo) in Kontsilsky Selsoviet, Khivsky District, Republic of Dagestan, Russia. Population: 38 (2010 census); 35 (2002 census); 7 (1989 Soviet census).

== Geography ==
Zaza is located 28 km northeast of Khiv (the district's administrative centre) by road. Chere is the nearest rural locality.
