= Urtil =

Urtil Уртиль Уртӏил
- Selo
- Location within Republic of Dagestan Location within Russia
- Coordinates: 41°53′N 47°53′E
- Country: Russia
- Region: Republic of Dagestan
- District: Khasavyurtovsky District
- Time zone: UTC+3:00

Urtil (Russian: Уртиль; Tabassaran: Уртӏил) is a rural locality (a selo) in Lyakhlinsky Selsoviet, Khivsky District, Republic of Dagestan, Russia. Population: 158 (2010 census); 149 (2002 census); 169 (1989 Soviet census).

== Geography ==
Urtil is located 24 km north of Khiv (the district's administrative centre) by road. Kuvig is the nearest rural locality.
