= Kuvig =

Kuvig Russian: Кувиг Tabassaran: Ккувигъ
- Selo
- Location within Republic of Dagestan Location within Russia
- Coordinates: 41°53′N 47°53′E
- Country: Russia
- Region: Republic of Dagestan
- District: Khasavyurtovsky District
- Time zone: UTC+3:00

Kuvig (Russian: Кувиг; Tabassaran: Ккувигъ) is a rural locality (a selo) in Lyakhlinsky Selsoviet, Khivsky District, Republic of Dagestan, Russia. Population: 99 (2010 census); 58 (2002 census); 102 (1989 Soviet census).

== Geography ==
Kuvig is located 23 km north of Khiv (the district's administrative centre) by road. Urtil is the nearest rural locality.
