= Chilikar =

Chilikar Чиликар ЧIилихъар
- Selo
- Location within Republic of Dagestan Location within Russia
- Coordinates: 41°44′N 48°03′E
- Country: Russia
- Region: Republic of Dagestan
- District: Khasavyurtovsky District
- Time zone: UTC+3:00

Chilikar (Russian: Чиликар; Lezgian: ЧIилихъар) is a rural locality (a selo) in Koshkentsky Selsoviet, Khivsky District, Republic of Dagestan, Russia. Population: 485 (2010 census); 563 (2002 census); 427 (1989 Soviet census). There are 10 streets.

== Geography ==
Chilikar is located 16 km southeast of Khiv (the district's administrative centre) by road. Koshkent is the nearest rural locality.
