= Tsuduk =

Tsuduk Цудук Цӏудухъ
- Selo
- Location within Republic of Dagestan Location within Russia
- Coordinates: 41°46′N 47°53′E
- Country: Russia
- Region: Republic of Dagestan
- District: Khasavyurtovsky District
- Time zone: UTC+3:00

Tsuduk (Russian: Цудук; Tabassaran: Цӏудухъ) is a rural locality (a selo) in Kondiksky Selsoviet, Khivsky District, Republic of Dagestan, Russia. Population: 417 (2010 census); 398 (2002 census); 291 (1989 Soviet census). There are 2 streets.

== Geography ==
Tsuduk is located 6 km northwest of Khiv (the district's administrative centre) by road. Kondik is the nearest rural locality.
