= Urga, Republic of Dagestan =

Urga Урга
- Selo
- Location within Republic of Dagestan Location within Russia
- Coordinates: 41°52′N 47°51′E
- Country: Russia
- Region: Republic of Dagestan
- District: Khivsky District
- Time zone: UTC+3:00

Urga (Russian: Урга) is a rural locality (a selo) and the administrative center of Urginsky Selsoviet, Khivsky District, Republic of Dagestan, Russia. Population: 269 (2010 census); 219 (2002 census); 226 (1989 Soviet census). There are 2 streets in this selo.

== Geography ==
It is located 14 km from Khiv (the district's administrative centre), 126 km from Makhachkala (capital of Dagestan) and 1,761 km from Moscow. Yarag is the nearest rural locality.
