= Khoredzh =

Khoredzh Хоредж
- Selo
- Location within Republic of Dagestan Location within Russia
- Coordinates: 41°44′N 47°52′E
- Country: Russia
- Region: Republic of Dagestan
- District: Khivsky District
- Time zone: UTC+3:00

Khoredzh (Russian: Хоредж) is a rural locality (a selo) and the administrative center of Khoredzhsky Selsoviet, Khivsky District, Republic of Dagestan, Russia. Population: 1,079 (2010 census); 886 (2002 census); 621 (1989 Soviet census). There are 6 streets in this selo.

== Geography ==
It is located 5 km from Khiv (the district's administrative centre), 140 km from Makhachkala (capital of Dagestan) and 1,774 km from Moscow. Laka is the nearest rural locality.
