= Ashaga-Zakhit =

Ashaga-Zakhit Ашага-Захит
- Selo
- Location within Republic of Dagestan Location within Russia
- Coordinates: 41°41′N 47°57′E
- Country: Russia
- Region: Republic of Dagestan
- District: Khivsky District
- Time zone: UTC+3:00

Ashaga-Zakhit (Russian: Ашага-Захит) is a rural locality (a selo) and the administrative center of Zakhitsky Selsoviet, Khivsky District, Republic of Dagestan, Russia. The population was 274 as of 1970.

== Geography ==
It is located 7 km from Khiv (the district's administrative centre), 147 km from Makhachkala (capital of Dagestan) and 1,783 km from Moscow. Yukhari-Zakhit is the nearest rural locality.
