= Ashaga-Yarak =

Ashaga-Yarak Ашага-Ярак Асккан Яракк
- Selo
- Location within Republic of Dagestan Location within Russia
- Coordinates: 41°49′N 47°57′E
- Country: Russia
- Region: Republic of Dagestan
- District: Khasavyurtovsky District
- Time zone: UTC+3:00

Ashaga-Yarak (Russian: Ашага-Ярак; Tabassaran: Асккан Яракк) is a rural locality (a selo) and the administrative centre of Ashaga-Yaraksky Selsoviet, Khivsky District, Republic of Dagestan, Russia. Population: 1,329 (2010 census); 1,156 (2002 census); 897 (1989 Soviet census). There are 11 streets.

== Geography ==
Ashaga-Yarak is located 14 km north of Khiv (the district's administrative centre) by road. Yukhari-Yarak is the nearest rural locality.
