= Furdag =

Furdag Фурдаг
- Selo
- Location within Republic of Dagestan Location within Russia
- Coordinates: 41°51′N 47°51′E
- Country: Russia
- Region: Republic of Dagestan
- District: Khasavyurtovsky District
- Time zone: UTC+3:00

Furdag (Russian: Фурдаг) is a rural locality (a selo) in Urginsky Selsoviet, Khivsky District, Republic of Dagestan, Russia. Population: 201 (2010 census); 202 (2002 census); 225 (1989 Soviet census).

== Geography ==
Furdag is located 17 km north of Khiv (the district's administrative centre) by road. Urga is the nearest rural locality.
