= Mezhgyul =

Mezhgyul Межгюль
- Selo
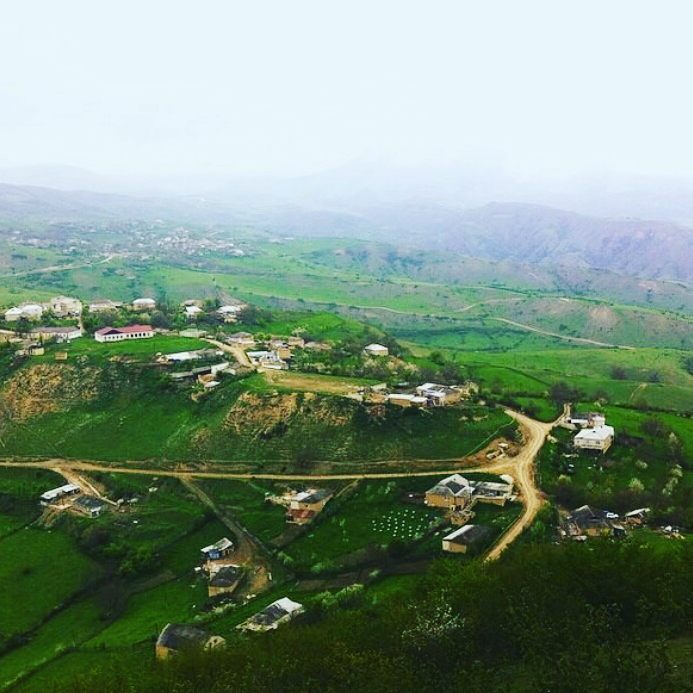

- Location within Republic of Dagestan Location within Russia
- Coordinates: 41°48′N 48°00′E
- Country: Russia
- Region: Republic of Dagestan
- District: Khivsky District
- Time zone: UTC+3:00

Mezhgyul (Russian: Межгюль) is a rural locality (a selo) and the administrative center of Mezhgyulsky Selsoviet, Khivsky District, Republic of Dagestan, Russia. Population: 1,215 (2010 census); 1,111 (2002 census); 825 (1989 Soviet census). There are nine streets in this selo.

== Geography ==
It is located 9 km from Khiv (the district's administrative centre), 137 km from Makhachkala (capital of Dagestan) and 1,774 km from Moscow. Zildik is the nearest rural locality.
