= Kushtil =

Kushtil Куштиль
- Selo
- Location within Republic of Dagestan Location within Russia
- Coordinates: 41°49′N 47°53′E
- Country: Russia
- Region: Republic of Dagestan
- District: Khasavyurtovsky District
- Time zone: UTC+3:00

Kushtil (Russian: Куштиль) is a rural locality (a selo) in Khivsky District, Republic of Dagestan, Russia. Population: 966 (2010 census); 904 (2002 census); 734 (1989 Soviet census).

== Geography ==
Kushtil is located 11 km north of Khiv (the district's administrative centre) by road. Chuvek is the nearest rural locality.
