= Tslak =

Tslak Цлак Цлахъ
- Selo
- Location within Republic of Dagestan Location within Russia
- Coordinates: 41°42′N 47°56′E
- Country: Russia
- Region: Republic of Dagestan
- District: Khasavyurtovsky District
- Time zone: UTC+3:00

Tslak (Russian: Цлак; Lezgian: Цлахъ) is a rural locality (a selo) in Ashaga-Arkhitsky Selsoviet, Khivsky District, Republic of Dagestan, Russia. Population: 147 (2010 census); 137 (2002 census); 99 (1989 Soviet census). There are 7 streets.

== Geography ==
Tslak is located 15 km south of Khiv (the district's administrative centre) by road. Yukhari-Zakhit is the nearest rural locality.
