= Trkal =

Trkal Тркал ТIркIал
- Selo
- Location within Republic of Dagestan Location within Russia
- Coordinates: 41°42′N 47°58′E
- Country: Russia
- Region: Republic of Dagestan
- District: Khasavyurtovsky District
- Time zone: UTC+3:00

Trkal (Russian: Тркал; Lezgian: ТIркIал) is a rural locality (a selo) in Ashaga-Arkhitsky Selsoviet, Khivsky District, Republic of Dagestan, Russia. Population: 27 (2010 census); 23 (2002 census); 13 (1989 Soviet census). There are 10 streets.

== Geography ==
Trkal is located 12 km southeast of Khiv (the district's administrative centre) by road. Tslak is the nearest rural locality.
