= Ghazi (warrior) =

Arabic term for a military raider

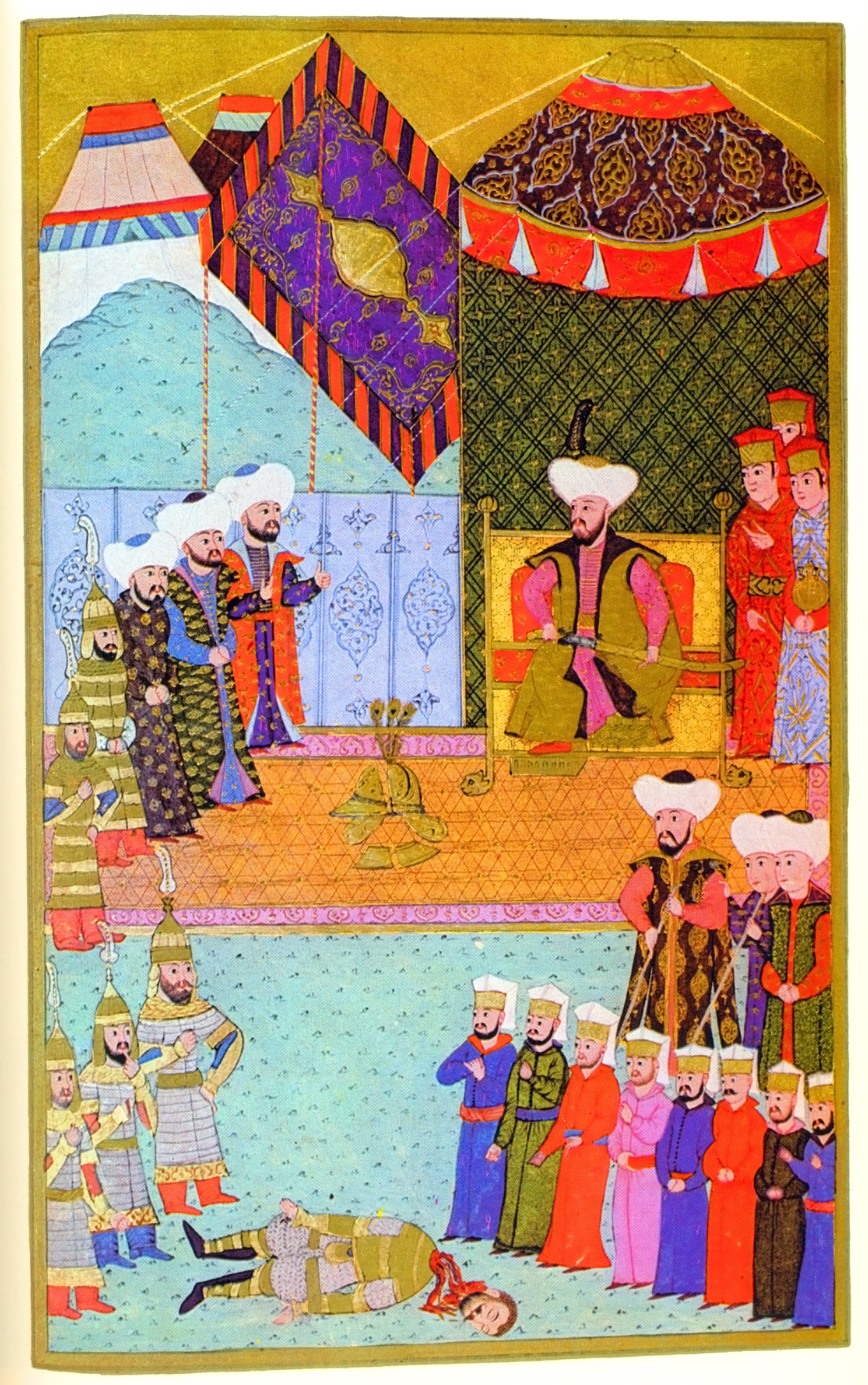
The "Ghazi Sultan" Murad II and Władysław III of Poland

A ghazi (or gazi /ˈɡæzi/; Arabic: غازي ghāzī [ɣaːˈziː], pl. ghuzāt) is an individual who participated in a ghazwa (غَزْو [ɣazw]) – a military expedition or raid against those whom they considered "Kafirs". Early Islamic literature characterised as ghazwa the expeditions led by the Islamic prophet Muhammad; later, Turkic military commanders used the word to refer to their wars of conquest.

In the context of the wars between Russia and the Muslim peoples of the Caucasus, starting as early as Sheikh Mansur's resistance to Russian expansion from 1785 to 1791, the word ghazwa usually appears in the form gazavat (Russian: газават).

In English-language literature, the word ghazw often appears as "razzia", a borrowing through French from Maghrebi Arabic.

In modern Turkish, the word gazi refers to veterans, and also (as a title) to Turkic Muslim champions such as Ertuğrul (Ertuğrul Ghazi) and Sultan Osman I (Osman Ghazi).

== Ghazwa as raid—razzia ==
In pre-Islamic Bedouin culture, ghazw[a] was a form of limited warfare verging on brigandage that avoided head-on confrontations and instead emphasized raiding and looting, usually of livestock (see cattle raiding). The Umayyad-period Bedouin poet al-Kutami wrote the oft-quoted verses: "Our business is to make raids on the enemy, on our neighbor and our own brother, in the event we find none to raid but a brother." William Montgomery Watt hypothesized that Muhammad found it useful to divert this continuous internecine warfare toward his enemies, making it the basis of his war strategy; according to Watt, the celebrated battle of Badr started as one such razzia. As a form of warfare, the razzia was then mimicked by the Christian states of Iberia in their relations with the taifa states; rough synonyms and similar tactics are the Iberian cavalgada and the Anglo-French chevauchée.

The word razzia was used in French colonial context particularly for raids to plunder and enslavement from among the people of Western and Central Africa, also known as rezzou when practiced by the Tuareg. The word was adopted from ġaziya of Algerian Arabic vernacular and later became a figurative name for any act of pillage, with its verb form razzier.

== Historical development ==
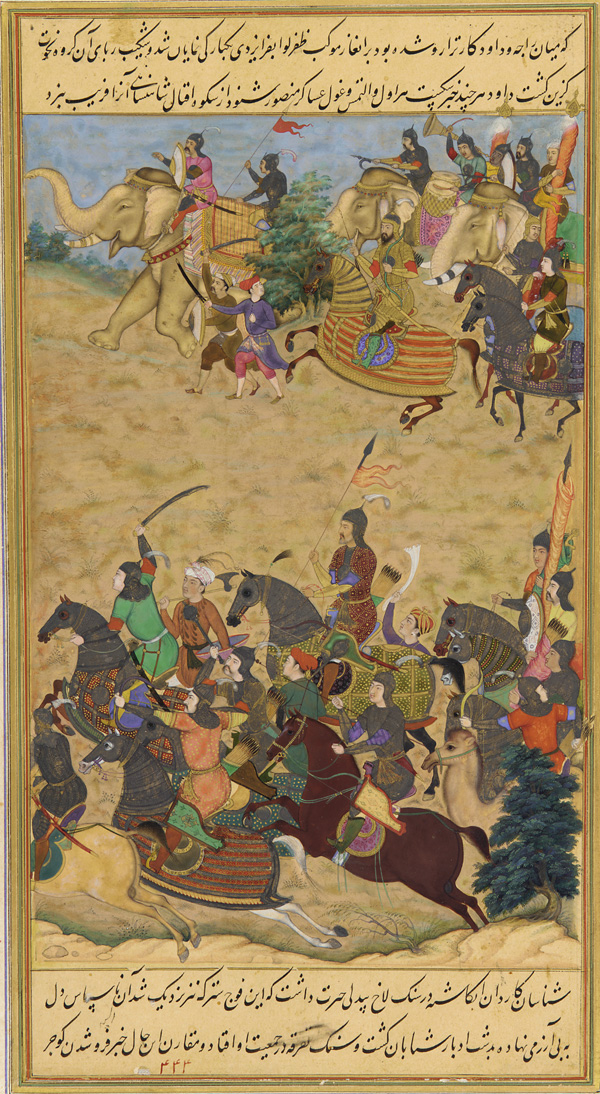
Young Akbar assumed the title Badshah Ghazi after leading a Mughal Army of 70,000 during the Second Battle of Panipat, against 30,000 mainly Hindu adversaries led by Hemu.

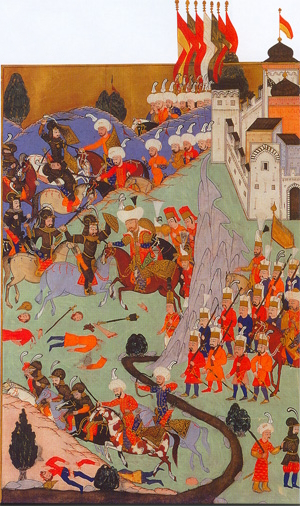
Ottoman Ghazat defeat the Crusaders during the Battle of Nicopolis.

Ghazi (Arabic: غازي, ġāzī) is an Arabic word, the active participle of the verb ġazā, meaning 'to carry out a military expedition or raid'; the same verb can also mean 'to strive for' and Ghazi can thus share a similar meaning to Mujahid or "one who struggles". The verbal noun of ġazā is ġazw or ġazawān, with the meaning 'raiding'. A derived singulative in ġazwah refers to a single battle or raid. The term ghāzī dates to at least the Samanid period, where he appears as a mercenary and frontier fighter in Khorasan and Transoxiana. Later, up to 20,000 of them took part in the Indian campaigns of Mahmud of Ghazni.

Ghāzī warriors depended upon plunder for their livelihood, and were prone to brigandage and sedition in times of peace. The corporations into which they organized themselves attracted adventurers, zealots and religious and political dissidents of all ethnicities. In time, though, soldiers of Turkic ethnicity predominated, mirroring the acquisition of Mamluks, Turkic ghilman in the Mamluk retinues and guard corps of the caliphs and emirs and in the ranks of the ghazi corporation, some of whom would ultimately rise to military and later political dominance in various Muslim states.

In the west, Turkic ghāzīs made continual incursions along the Byzantine frontier zone, finding in the akritai (akritoi) their Greek counterparts. After the Battle of Manzikert these incursions intensified, and the region's people would see the ghāzī corporations coalesce into semi-chivalric fraternities, with the white cap and the club as their emblems. The height of the organizations would come during the Mongol conquest when many of them fled from Persia and Turkistan into Anatolia.

As organizations, the ghazi corporations were fluid, reflecting their popular character, and individual ghāzī warriors would jump between them depending upon the prestige and success of a particular emir, rather like the mercenary bands around western condottiere. It was from these Anatolian territories conquered during the ghazw that the Ottoman Empire emerged, and in its legendary traditions it is said that its founder, Osman I, came forward as a ghāzī thanks to the inspiration of Shaikh Ede Bali.

In later periods of Islamic history the honorific title of ghāzī was assumed by those Muslim rulers who showed conspicuous success in extending the domains of Islam, and eventually the honorific became exclusive to them, much as the Roman title imperator became the exclusive property of the supreme ruler of the Roman state and his family.

The Ottomans were probably the first to adopt this practice, and in any case the institution of ghazw reaches back to the beginnings of their state:

By early Ottoman times it had become a title of honor and a claim to leadership. In an inscription of 1337 [concerning the building of the Bursa mosque], Orhan, second ruler of the Ottoman line, describes himself as "Sultan, son of the Sultan of the Gazis, Gazi son of Gazi… frontier lord of the horizons."

Ottoman historian Ahmedi in his work explain the meaning of Ghazi:

A Ghazi is the instrument of the religion of Allah, a servant of God who purifies the earth from the filth of polytheism. The Ghazi is the sword of God, he is the protector and the refuge of the believers. If he becomes a martyr in the ways of God, do not believe that he has died, he lives in beatitude with Allah, he has eternal life.

The first nine Ottoman chiefs all used Ghazi as part of their full throne name (as with many other titles, the nomination was added even though it did not fit the office), and often afterwards. However, it never became a formal title within the ruler's formal style, unlike Sultan ul-Mujahidin, used by Sultan Murad Khan II Khoja-Ghazi, 6th Sovereign of the House of Osman (1421–1451), styled 'Abu'l Hayrat, Sultan ul-Mujahidin, Khan of Khans, Grand Sultan of Anatolia and Rumelia, and of the Cities of Adrianople and Philippolis.

Because of the political legitimacy that would accrue to those bearing this title, Muslim rulers vied amongst themselves for preeminence in the ghāziya, with the Ottoman Sultans generally acknowledged as excelling all others in this feat:

For political reasons the Ottoman Sultans — also being the last dynasty of Caliphs — attached the greatest importance to safeguarding and strengthening the reputation which they enjoyed as ghāzīs in the Muslim world. When they won victories in the ghazā in the Balkans they used to send accounts of them (singular, feth-nāme) as well as slaves and booty to eastern Muslim potentates. Christian knights captured by Bāyezīd I at his victory over the Crusaders at Nicopolis in 1396, and sent to Cairo, Baghdad and Tabriz were paraded through the streets, and occasioned great demonstrations in favour of the Ottomans. (Cambridge History of Islam, p. 290)

Ghazi was also used as a title of honor in the Ottoman Empire, generally translated as the Victorious, for military officers of high rank, who distinguished themselves in the field against non-Moslem enemies; thus it was conferred on Osman Pasha after his famous defence of Plevna in Bulgaria and on Mustafa Kemal Pasha (later known as Atatürk) for leading the victory in the Battle of the Sakarya.

Some Muslim rulers (in Afghanistan) personally used the subsidiary style Padshah-i-Ghazi.

== Muhammad's Ghazwa ==
Ghazwah, which literally means "campaigns", is typically used by biographers to refer to all the Prophet's journeys from Medina, whether to make peace treaties and preach Islam to the tribes, to go on ʽumrah, to pursue enemies who attacked Medina, or to engage in the nine battles.

Muhammad participated in 27 Ghazwa. The first Ghazwa he participated in was the Invasion of Waddan in August 623, he ordered his followers to attack a Quraysh caravan.

=== Operationally ===
When performed within the context of Islamic warfare, the ghazw's function was to weaken the enemy's defenses in preparation for his eventual conquest and subjugation. Because the typical ghazw raiding party often did not have the size or strength to seize military or territorial objectives, this usually meant sudden attacks on weakly defended targets (e.g. villages) with the intent of demoralizing the enemy and destroying material which could support their military forces. Though Islam's rules of warfare offered protection to non-combatants such as women, monastics and peasants in that they could not be slain, their property could still be looted or destroyed, and they themselves could be abducted and enslaved (Cambridge History of Islam, p. 269):

The only way of avoiding the onslaughts of the ghāzīs was to become subjects of the Islamic state. Non-Muslims acquired the status of dhimmīs, living under its protection. Most Christian sources confuse these two stages in the Ottoman conquests. The Ottomans, however, were careful to abide by these rules... Faced with the terrifying onslaught of the ghāzīs, the population living outside the confines of the empire, in the 'abode of war', often renounced the ineffective protection of Christian states, and sought refuge in subjection to the Ottoman Empire. Peasants in open country in particular lost nothing by this change.
Cambridge History of Islam, p. 285

A good source on the conduct of the traditional ghazw raid are the medieval Islamic jurists, whose discussions as to which conduct is allowed and which is forbidden in the course of warfare reveal some of the practices of this institution. One such source is Averroes' Bidāyat al-Mujtahid wa-Nihāyat al-Muqtasid (translated in Peters, Jihad in Classical and Modern Islam: A Reader, Chapter 4).

== Use in the modern era ==
In the 19th century, Muslim fighters in North Caucasus who were resisting the Russian military operations declared a gazawat (understood as holy war) against the Russian Orthodox invasion. Although it is not known for certain, it is believed that Dagestani Islamic scholar Muhammad al-Yaraghi was the ideologist of this holy war. In 1825, a congress of ulema in the village of Yarag declared gazawat against the Russians. Its first leader was Ghazi Muhammad; after his death, Imam Shamil would eventually continue it.

After the November 2015 Paris attacks, the Islamic State group is said to have referred to its actions as "ghazwa".

In modern Turkey, gazi is used to refer to veterans. 19 September is celebrated as Veterans Day in Turkey.

== Notable examples ==
Examples of people ascribed the epithet ghazi include:

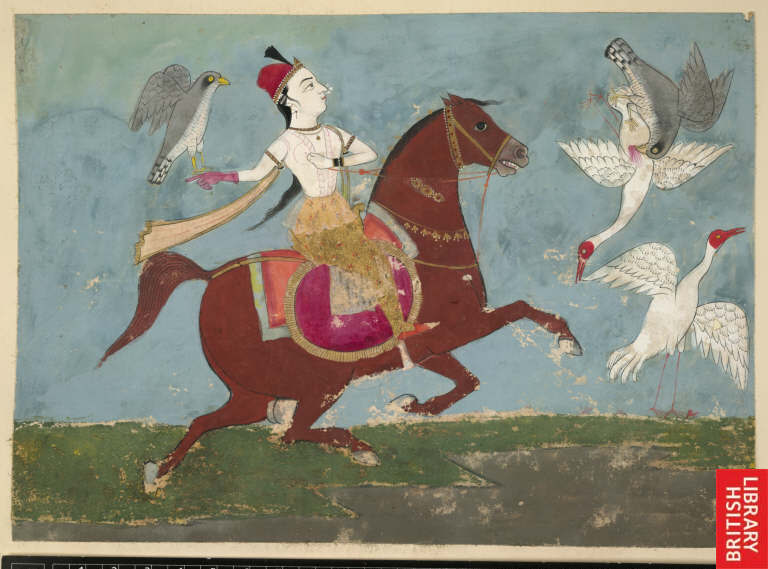
Chand Bibi hawking on a chestnut stallion.

- Battal Ghazi, 8th century, Arab military commander
- Ahmad ibn Ibrahim al-Ghazi, 16th century general and Imam of the Adal Sultanate
- Belek Ghazi, Bey of the Artuqids
- Gazi Gümüshtigin, second ruler of the Danishmendids
- Danishmend Gazi 12th century, founder of the Danishmendids
- Gazi Gümüshtigin, second ruler of the Danishmendids
- Ertuğrul (13th century), leader of the Kayı tribe, father of Osman I
- Osman Gazi (1299–1326), founder of the Ottoman Empire
- Orhan Gazi (1281–1362), second Ottoman Sultan
- Gazi Sultan Murad, sixth Ottoman Sultan
- Gazi Sultan Mehmed, conqueror of Constantinople
- Mohammad Shah Qajar, Shah of Iran from 1834 to 1848
- Gazi Çelebi (14th century), pirate and ruler of Sinop, Turkey
- Gazi Evrenos (1288–1417), Ottoman military commander
- Sikandar Khan Ghazi, a military commander during the 1303 Conquest of Sylhet
- Haydar Ghazi, second wazir of Sylhet who fought in the 1303 Conquest of Sylhet
- Ikhtiyaruddin Ghazi Shah, 14th-century Sultan of Sonargaon
- Shahzada Danyal Dulal Ghazi, Prince of Bengal who fought in the 1498 Conquest of Kamata
- Gazi Hüsrev Bey, an Ottoman bey of Bosnian origin (1480–1541)
- Ğazı I Giray, 16th century Crimean Tatar khan
- Gazi Osman Pasha (1832–1897), Ottoman field marshal
- Ghazi Saiyyad Salar Masud (1014–1034), Ghaznavid military commander
- Gazi Saiyyed Salar Sahu (early 11th century), Ghaznavid military commander
- Gazi Mustafa Kemal Atatürk, founder and first president of the Turkish Republic; commander during the First World War and the Turkish War of Independence
- Ghazi Amanullah Khan, King who launched Afghanistan's Independence war in 1919, resulting in the first independence of a country from Britain since the American Revolution of 1776
- Ghazi Umra Khan of Jandol, "Afghan Napoleon" who led the famous rebellion from Chitral against the British Empire
- Ghazi Wazir Akbar Khan, Durrani prince who led Afghan forces against the Sikh Empire at the Battle of Jamrud, and defeated the British Empire in the First Anglo-Afghan War
- Ghazi Mohammad Ayub Khan, Victor of the Battle of Maiwand
- Ghazi Mir Zaman Khan, War Hero of the Third Anglo-Afghan War
- Mahmud of Ghazni, Ghaznavid sultan who was known by this epithet due to his Indian campaigns.
- Nasir I of Kalat, 18th-century King of Balochistan, with epithet Ghazi-e-Din
- Almanzor, Andalusian hajib and regent of the Caliphate of Cordoba; famous for his many campaigns, conquests, and raids against Christian realms in Iberia as well as in North Africa.
- Chand Bibi, Queen and regent of the Sultanates of Bijapur and Ahmednagar; remembered for her defence of the Deccan Sultanates from the Mughals led by Akbar.
- Sayyida al-Hurra, Andalusian-born queen of Morocco, governor of Tetouan, and founder of the Barbary Corsairs. Forced to flee the fall of Granada in her youth, she proclaimed a maritime jihad against the newly-unified Spain, and conducted raids on Spanish treasure-ships, as well as a famous raid on Gibraltar.
- Kara Fatima Khanum, a Kurdish tribal chieftess from Marash, who volunteered to serve the Ottoman Empire in the Crimean War

== Related terms ==
- Akıncı: (Turkish) "raider", a later replacement for ghāzī
- al-'Awāsim: the Syrio-Anatolian frontier area between the Byzantine and various caliphal empires
- ribāt: fortified convent used by a militant religious order; most commonly used in North Africa
- thughūr: an advanced/frontier fortress
- uc: Turkish term for frontier; uc beği (frontier lord) was a title (roughly analogous to marquess) assumed by early Ottoman rulers; later replaced by serhadd (frontier)
- Mujahideen

== See also ==
- Anatolian Beyliks
- Battle of Hamra al-Asad
- Fedayeen
- Ghaza thesis
- Janissary
- Jihad
  - Jihadism
- Muslim conquests
- Spread of Islam
