= Kulig, Republic of Dagestan =

Kulig Кулиг Кьуликк
- Selo
- Location within Republic of Dagestan Location within Russia
- Coordinates: 41°52′N 47°51′E
- Country: Russia
- Region: Republic of Dagestan
- District: Khasavyurtovsky District
- Time zone: UTC+3:00

Kulig (Russian: Кулиг; Tabassaran: Кьуликк) is a rural locality (a selo) in Lyakhlinsky Selsoviet, Khivsky District, Republic of Dagestan, Russia. Population: 120 (2010 census); 218 (2002 census); 197 (1989 Soviet census).

== Geography ==
Kulig is located 23 km north of Khiv (the district's administrative centre) by road. Vertil is the nearest rural locality.
