= Yukhari-Zakhit =

Yukhari-Zakhit Юхари-Захит
- Selo
- Location within Republic of Dagestan Location within Russia
- Coordinates: 41°41′N 47°56′E
- Country: Russia
- Region: Republic of Dagestan
- District: Khivsky District
- Time zone: UTC+3:00

Yukhari-Zakhit (Russian: Юхари-Захит) is a rural locality (a selo) in Zakhitsky Selsoviet, Khivsky District, Republic of Dagestan, Russia. Population: 16 (2002 census); 889 (1989 Soviet census).

== Geography ==
It is located 6 km from Khiv (the district's administrative centre), 147 km from Makhachkala (capital of Dagestan) and 1,783 km from Moscow. Ashaga-Zakhit is the nearest rural locality.
