= Laka, Republic of Dagestan =

Laka Лака
- Selo
- Location within Republic of Dagestan Location within Russia
- Coordinates: 41°45′N 47°52′E
- Country: Russia
- Region: Republic of Dagestan
- District: Khivsky District
- Time zone: UTC+3:00

Laka (Russian: Лака) is a rural locality (a selo) in Khoredzhsky Selsoviet, Khivsky District, Republic of Dagestan, Russia. Population: 602 (2010 census); 414 (2002 census); 381 (1989 Soviet census). There are 4 streets in this selo.

== Geography ==
It is located 4 km from Khiv (the district's administrative centre), 139 km from Makhachkala (capital of Dagestan) and 1,774 km from Moscow. Khoredzh is the nearest rural locality.
