= Yargil =

Yargil Яргиль Яргъил
- Selo
- Location within Republic of Dagestan Location within Russia
- Coordinates: 41°47′N 47°57′E
- Country: Russia
- Region: Republic of Dagestan
- District: Khasavyurtovsky District
- Time zone: UTC+3:00

Yargil (Russian: Яргиль; Tabassaran: Яргъил) is a rural locality (a selo) in Ashaga-Yaraksky Selsoviet, Khivsky District, Republic of Dagestan, Russia. Population: 39 (2010 census); 44 (2002 census); 19 (1989 Soviet census).

== Geography ==
Yargil is located 13 km northeast of Khiv (the district's administrative centre) by road. Kug is the nearest rural locality.
