= Kug, Republic of Dagestan =

Kug Куг Хъукьвар
- Selo
- Location within Republic of Dagestan Location within Russia
- Coordinates: 41°46′N 47°57′E
- Country: Russia
- Region: Republic of Dagestan
- District: Khasavyurtovsky District
- Time zone: UTC+3:00

Kug (Russian: Куг; Lezgian: Хъукьвар) is a rural locality (a selo) in Khivsky District, Republic of Dagestan, Russia. Population: 793 (2021 census); 794 (2002 census); 722 (1989 Soviet census). There are 7 streets.

== Geography ==
Kug is located 13 km northeast of Khiv (the district's administrative centre) by road. Yargil is the nearest rural locality.
