= Lyakhlya =

Lyakhlya Ляхля Ляхла
- Selo
- Location within Republic of Dagestan Location within Russia
- Coordinates: 41°52′N 47°52′E
- Country: Russia
- Region: Republic of Dagestan
- District: Khasavyurtovsky District
- Time zone: UTC+3:00

Lyakhlya (Russian: Ляхля; Tabassaran: Ляхла) is a rural locality (a selo) and the administrative centre of Lyakhlinsky Selsoviet, Khivsky District, Republic of Dagestan, Russia. Population: 612 (2010 census); 493 (2002 census); 534 (1989 Soviet census). There are 9 streets.

== Geography ==
Lyakhlya is located 22 km north of Khiv (the district's administrative centre) by road. Garig is the nearest rural locality.
