= Zakhit =

Zakhit Захит ЗахитI
- Selo
- Location within Republic of Dagestan Location within Russia
- Coordinates: 41°43′N 48°22′E
- Country: Russia
- Region: Republic of Dagestan
- District: Khasavyurtovsky District
- Time zone: UTC+3:00

Zakhit (Russian: Захит; Lezgian: ЗахитI) is a rural locality (a selo) in Zakhitsky Selsoviet, Khivsky District, Republic of Dagestan, Russia. Population: 1,133 (2010 census); 1,132 (2002 census); 14 (1989 Soviet census). There are 12 streets.

== Geography ==
Zakhit is located 44 km east of Khiv (the district's administrative centre) by road. Novy Aul is the nearest rural locality.
