= Archug =

Archug Арчуг Арчугъ
- Selo
- Location within Republic of Dagestan Location within Russia
- Coordinates: 41°47′N 47°51′E
- Country: Russia
- Region: Republic of Dagestan
- District: Khasavyurtovsky District
- Time zone: UTC+3:00

Archug (Russian: Арчуг; Tabassaran: Арчугъ) is a rural locality (a selo) in Kondiksky Selsoviet, Khivsky District, Republic of Dagestan, Russia. Population: 109 (2010 census); 140 (2002 census); 138 (1989 Soviet census).

== Geography ==
Archug is located 12 km northwest of Khiv (the district's administrative centre) by road. Kondik is the nearest rural locality.
