= Yukhari-Yarak =

Yukhari-Yarak Юхари-Ярак Заан Яракк
- Selo
- Location within Republic of Dagestan Location within Russia
- Coordinates: 41°50′N 47°56′E
- Country: Russia
- Region: Republic of Dagestan
- District: Khasavyurtovsky District
- Time zone: UTC+3:00

Yukhari-Yarak (Russian: Юхари-Ярак; Tabassaran: Заан Яракк) is a rural locality (a selo) in Ashaga-Yaraksky Selsoviet, Khivsky District, Republic of Dagestan, Russia. Population: 349 (2010 census); 342 (2002 census); 373 (1989 Soviet census). There are 5 streets.

== Geography ==
Yukhari-Yarak is located 16 km north of Khiv (the district's administrative centre) by road. Ashaga-Yarak is the nearest rural locality.
