= Vertil =

Vertil Вертиль
- Selo
- Location within Republic of Dagestan Location within Russia
- Coordinates: 41°52′N 47°51′E
- Country: Russia
- Region: Republic of Dagestan
- District: Khasavyurtovsky District
- Time zone: UTC+3:00

Vertil (Russian: Вертиль) is a rural locality (a selo) in Urginsky Selsoviet, Khivsky District, Republic of Dagestan, Russia. Population: 168 (2010 census); 167 (2002 census); 178 (1989 Soviet census).

== Geography ==
Vertil is located 18 km north of Khiv (the district's administrative centre) by road. Urga is the nearest rural locality.
