= Yarag =

Yarag Яраг
- Selo
- Location within Republic of Dagestan Location within Russia
- Coordinates: 41°52′N 47°51′E
- Country: Russia
- Region: Republic of Daghestan
- District: Khivsky District
- Time zone: UTC+3:00

Yaragh (Russian: Яраг) is a rural locality (a selo) in Urginsky Selsoviet, Khivsky District, Republic of Daghestan, Russia. The population was 69 as of 1970.

== Geography ==
It is located 14 km from Khiv (the district's administrative centre), 127 km from Makhachkala (capital of Dagestan) and 1,762 km from Moscow. Urga is the nearest rural locality.
