= Esedulla Abachev =

Russian lieutenant general and politician (born 1984)

Hero of the Russian Federation Hero of the Luhansk People's Republic Esedulla Abachev
- Эседулла Абачев
- Abachev in 2026

Russian Federation Senator from the Luhansk People's Republic (Note: In 2014, the Russian-backed separatist Luhansk People's Republic (LPR) was proclaimed. During the 2022 Russian invasion of Ukraine, Russia announced the annexation of the LPR. The UN General Assembly rejected the annexation under Resolution ES-11/4, and the vast majority of countries do not recognise it either. The territory of the LPR is still internationally considered part of Ukraine's Luhansk Oblast but under Russian occupation.)
- Incumbent
- Assumed office 26 October 2026
- Preceded by: Darya Lantratova

Personal details
- Born: 13 June 1968 (age 58) Zildik, Dagestani ASSR, Russian SFSR, Soviet Union
- Party: United Russia
- Education: Kharkov Guards Higher Tank Command School (1989); Combined Arms Academy of the Armed Forces of the Russian Federation (2002)

Military service
- Allegiance: Soviet Union; Russia
- Branch/service: Soviet Armed Forces; Russian Armed Forces
- Years of service: 1985-2025
- Commands: 19th Motor Rifle Division (2014-2017); 5th Guards Combined Arms Army (2017-2021); 2nd Army Corps of the LPR (2022-2024)
- Battles/wars: Nagorno-Karabakh conflict; Second Chechen War; Russo-Georgian War; Russian intervention in the Syrian civil war; Russo-Ukrainian War; Russian invasion of Ukraine; Eastern Ukraine offensive

Esedulla Abdulmuminovich Abachev (Russian: Эседулла Абдулмуминович Абачев; born 13 June 1968) is a Russian lieutenant general and politician who has served as the Russian Federation Senator from the Luhansk People's Republic since 2026. Prior to entering politics in 2026, Abachev was a longtime soldier in the Russian Armed Forces, having served in numerous conflicts, most notably during the Russian invasion of Ukraine. He also commanded multiple units like the 19th Motor Rifle Division and the 2nd Army Corps of the LPR, and was also previously Chief of Staff of the 5th Guards Combined Arms Army. For his actions during the Russian invasion, he was awarded both the title of Hero of the Luhansk People's Republic and Hero of the Russian Federation.

== Early life ==
Abachev was born on 13 June 1968 in the village of Zildik, which was then part of the Dagestani ASSR of the Russian SFSR within the Soviet Union. After doing his mandatory military service with the Soviet Army starting in 1985, he graduated from the Kharkov Guards Higher Tank Command School in Kharkov (or Kharkiv), Ukrainian SSR, in 1989.

== Military career ==
=== 1990s to 2000s ===
Following his graduation in Kharkov, he was given the rank of lieutenant and was assigned to the Soviet Armed Forces in the 78th Tank Division. After the collapse of the Soviet Union, he became a commander of a tank company within the 21st Separate Tank Battalion of the 20th Guards Motor Rifle Division for Russia in the mid-1990s. As commander, he was assigned to the North Caucasus Military District of Russia, and his unit saw action in the Second Chechen War and the Nagorno-Karabakh conflict. He then decided to pursue higher education, and in 2002 graduated from the Combined Arms Academy of the Armed Forces of the Russian Federation. After graduation, he was assigned to be the head of the logistics service and later commander of a regiment for the 78th Tank Brigade, and during that time, he again saw action during the Russo-Georgian War in 2008.

=== 2010s to 2022 ===
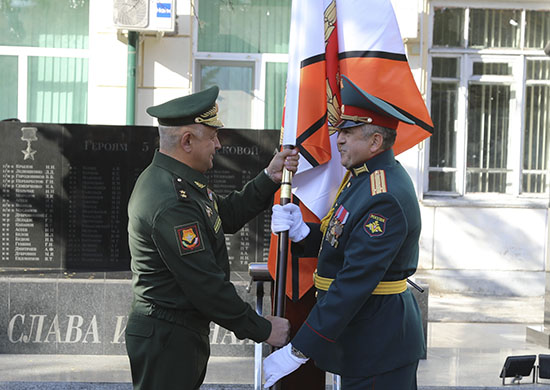
Yevgeny Nikiforov presenting Abachev with a new banner for the 5th Guards Combined Arms Army in 2016.

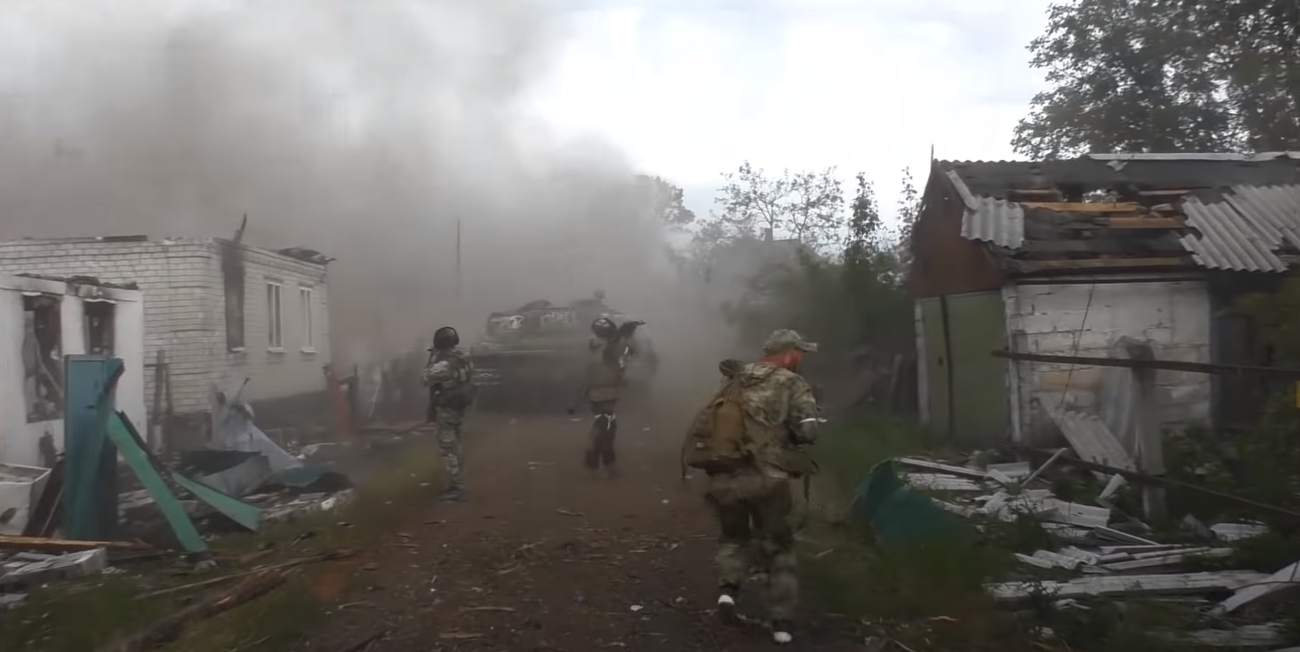
For his actions during the Battle of Lysychansk (depicted here) during the so-called "special military operation", Abachev was awarded the title of Hero of the Russian Federation.

In 2014, Abachev was finally transferred from the 78th to being commander of the 19th Motor Rifle Division, which was based in the city of Vladikavkaz. During his time commanding the brigade, the 19th was stationed during the Russian intervention in Syria. Unofficially, however, they were accused by Ukrainian sources of supporting the War in the Donbas. Although they did not cross the border, Abachev's units were said to have been stationed in the Matveyevo-Kurgansky District of Rostov Oblast (which is a couple of kilometres from Donetsk Oblast), and to have stationed combat vehicles like BM-21 Grads there. He was officially dismissed from the post in 2017 and replaced by Colonel Roman Vyazovsky. Afterwards, he was reassigned to be Chief of Staff and First Deputy Commander of the 5th Guards Combined Arms Army in Ussuriysk, a role Abachev would work until 2021.

In 2021, Abachev was given the role of plenipotentiary representative of the Ministry of Defense of Russia in the Republic of Dagestan. Just before the 2022 Russian invasion of Ukraine, he was again reassigned to become Deputy Commander of the 8th Guards Combined Arms Army within the Southern Military District.

=== 2022-2026: War in Ukraine ===
After the Russian invasion of Ukraine, Abachev was immediately assigned to be the commander of the 2nd Army Corps of the People's Militia of the Luhansk People's Republic. As a participant in the so-called "special military operation" (SVO), he was assigned alongside the troops of the Central Military District of Aleksandr Lapin to the Battle of Lysychansk. Lapin and Abachev together successfully enclosed the city in a ring, leading to what the Russian Ministry of Defense called a mass surrender, although Ukrainian president Volodymyr Zelenskyy said that the troops had already been ordered to retreat prior to save their lives.

In February 2023, he was promoted to lieutenant general in the Russian Armed Forces. Three months later, he was appointed deputy commander of the Western Military District.

In March 2024, he was reappointed as Deputy Commander of the restored Leningrad Military District under Lapin, who was chosen as commander. As Deputy Commander, he was assigned to command the Kursk direction, and he prewarned Lapin about the Kursk campaign and their plans to cut off the Belgorod region about the 2023 Belgorod Oblast incursions, although Lapin did not listen. On the night of 16-17 August 2025, it was reported that Ukrainian troops had managed to fire a missile strike and seriously injure troops near the Rylsk and Khomutovka highway in Kursk Oblast, including Abachev. The highway is near the Ukrainian border, about 15 kilometres away, and the settlements near it were ordered to undergo mandatory evacuation in September 2024. He was later transported by plane to the Vishnevsky Central Clinical Hospital in Moscow, where his arm and leg were amputated.

== Political career ==
After the end of his military career due to his injuries, Abachev was decided to enter politics. In October 2026, he became a Russian Federation Senator from the Luhansk People's Republic.

== Honours and awards ==
Abachev has been awarded the following awards and honours:

- Order "For Courage" (1995)
- Medal "For Courage" (2000)
- Order of Military Merit (2005)
- Medal of the Order "For Merit to the Fatherland", 2nd degree (2015)
- Medal of the Order "For Merit to the Fatherland", I degree with swords (2017)
- Order of Kadyrov (2022)
- Hero of the Russian Federation (with Gold Star) (2022)
- Hero of the Luhansk People's Republic (2022)
- Order "For Courage" (2024)
