= Darya Lantratova =

Russian politician (born 1984)

- Дарья Лантратова
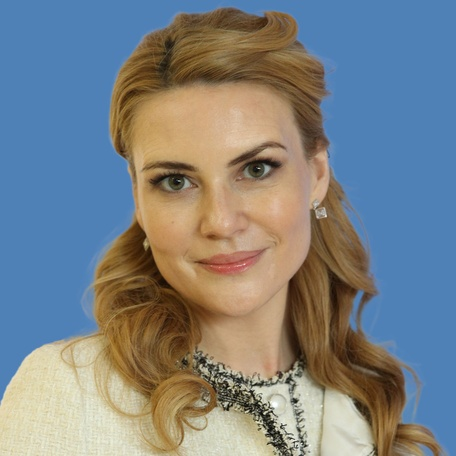

Russian Federation Senator from the Luhansk People's Republic
- In office 20 December 2022 – 30 September 2026
- Appointed by: Leonid Pasechnik
- Preceded by: office established
- Succeeded by: Esedulla Abachev

Personal details
- Born: 20 May 1984 (age 42) Mosrentgen, Moscow Oblast, Soviet Union
- Party: United Russia
- Education: Moscow State Pedagogical University; Academy of National Economy and Public Administration
- Awards: Medal of the Order "For Merit to the Fatherland" (2nd class, 2015) Medal of the Order "For Merit to the Fatherland" (1st class, 2018)

Darya Sergeyevna Lantratova (Russian: Дарья Сергеевна Лантратова; born on 20 May 1984), is a Russian politician who is currently the senator of the executive authority of the Luhansk People's Republic since 20 December 2022.

== Biography ==
According to her official biography, Darya Lantratova was born in Mosrentgen, Moscow Oblast on 20 May 1984. In 2006, she graduated from the Moscow State Pedagogical University and in 2022 from the Academy of National Economy and Public Administration.

Since 2008, she worked in the press service of the Russian Government under Vladimir Putin as Prime Minister. She then took the position of Head of the Department for Coordination of Information Interaction with Government Agencies of the presidential administration of Vladimir Putin after his return as President of Russia.

In 2021, she was appointed deputy to Andrey Turchak, then Secretary of the General Council of the ruling United Russia Party.

=== Role during the Russian invasion of Ukraine ===
According to media reports, after the Russian invasion of Ukraine in 2022 Lantratova was involved in the development of anti-Ukrainian narratives centrally communicated by Russian war propaganda.

On 20 December 2022, Leonid Pasechnik, the acting head of the Luhansk People's Republic, a Russian federal subject established on the territory of the occupied and annexed Luhansk Oblast of Ukraine, approved Lantratova as a senator representing the republic within the Federation Council of Russia. At the same time, she retained her position of deputy secretary of the General Council of the United Russia party. On 23 December, during the meeting of the Federation Council she in confirmed to the chamber.

=== Sanctions ===
On 25 February 2023, Lantratova was added to the EU sanctions list among other individuals and organisations supporting the 2022 Russian invasion of Ukraine. According to the decision of the EU Council, "In taking on and acting in this capacity [as the representative of the illegally annexed so-called “Luhansk People’s Republic”], she is therefore supporting actions and policies which undermine the territorial integrity, sovereignty and independence of Ukraine.

== Personal life ==
Lantratova is of Latvian descent. According to media reports, before 2008 she was member of the Tālava choir of the Moscow Latvian Culture Society. With the choir, she participated in the 23rd Latvian Song and Dance Festival in 2003.

In 2025, she was mentioned in an investigation about nepotism among the Russian elite, published by the award-winning Russian independent media outlet Proekt.
