= Asakent =

Asakent Асакент Асадхуьр
- Selo
- Location within Republic of Dagestan Location within Russia
- Coordinates: 41°45′N 48°00′E
- Country: Russia
- Region: Republic of Dagestan
- District: Khasavyurtovsky District
- Time zone: UTC+3:00

Asakent (Russian: Асакент; Lezgian: Асадхуьр) is a rural locality (a selo) in Kontsilsky Selsoviet, Khivsky District, Republic of Dagestan, Russia. Population: 108 (2010 census); 115 (2002 census); 80 (1989 Soviet census).

== Geography ==
Asakent is located 23 km east of Khiv (the district's administrative centre) by road. Kontsil is the nearest rural locality.
