= Atrik =

Atrik Атрик
- Selo
- Location within Republic of Dagestan Location within Russia
- Coordinates: 41°52′N 47°46′E
- Country: Russia
- Region: Republic of Dagestan
- District: Khasavyurtovsky District
- Time zone: UTC+3:00

Atrik (Russian: Атрик) is a rural locality (a selo) in Urginsky Selsoviet, Khivsky District, Republic of Dagestan, Russia. Population: 239 (2010 census); 184 (2002 census); 170 (1989 Soviet census).

== Geography ==
Atrik is located 29 km (18 mi) northwest of Khiv (the district's administrative centre) by road. Khursatil is the nearest rural locality.
