= Tabasaran people =

Northeast Caucasian ethnic group

Tabasaran

Total population
- c. 155,000

Regions with significant populations
- Russia: 151,466
- Ukraine: 977

Languages
- Tabasaran, Russian

Religion
- Sunni Islam

Related ethnic groups
- Other Lezgic Peoples, especially Aghuls

Tabasarans (Lezgian: Табасаранар) are a Lezgin sub-ethnic group native predominantly to Tabasaransky district of Dagestan, partly on the plain and in cities (Dagestanskiye Ogni, Derbent, Makhachkala, etc.). Their population in Russia is about 150,000. They speak the Tabasaran language of the Lezgin branch of the Northeast Caucasian family, but the Lezgin literary language and Russian are also common. Like their neighbors the Kaitags, the Tabasarans were converted to Islam at a fairly early date. They are mainly Sunni Muslims.

== History ==
The earliest mention of the Tabasarans are found in 7th century Armenian sources referring to them as an independent people of Dagestan. Arab historians referred to their land as "Tabarstan". In the 8th century, the Arabs conquered parts of the Caucasus including the territory of the Tabarsarans. In the 15th century, the Tabasrans formed a powerful principality called the Maisumat of Tabarsaran. However, the state was eventually divided into two due to internal struggles and both were conquered by the Russians in the early 19th century.

== Genetics ==
According to genetic study the following haplogroups are found to predominate among Tabasarans.

- J1 (77%)
- R1b (10%)
- G2 (3%)

According to another genetic study the following haplogroups are found to predominate among Tabasarans.

- R1b (64%)
- J1 (14%)
- J2 (12%)

== Culture ==
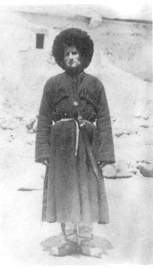
Tabasaran man in traditional costume.

=== Language ===
The main language of the Tabasaran people is the Tabasaran language (табасаран чIал, tabasaran ҫ̇al), which belongs to the Lezgic branch of Northeast Caucasian language family. It is closely related to neighbouring Lezgian and Aghul languages. UNESCO classifies Tabasaran language as "vulnerable". According to 2002 Russian census 97% of the Tabasaran can speak their ancestral language and a further 87% of them know Russian.

Under Soviet control Tabasaran has become one of the official languages of Dagestan.

=== Religion ===
The vast majority of Tabasarans profess Sunni Islam and belong to the Shafi'i school. Some elements originated from pre-Islamic Tabasaran beliefs, such as deity names and annual spring celebration known as Elbetsan (parallel to Iranic Nowruz and Lezgian Yaran-Suvar) have been preserved in the contemporary Tabasaran society.

== Economy ==
Tabasaran traditional economy has been based on agriculture and animal husbandry, as the regions inhabited by the group have a mild and warm climate with abundant water sources. Agriculturally grain farming, orchards and viticulture is common among the people. Carpet weaving, leatherworking, woolen clothes, woodworking and beekeeping form the domestic industries.

== Notable people ==
- Russian pole vaulter Yelena Isinbayeva and Kamal Khan-Magomedov, the 2015 European Games champion in men's Judo -66 kg, are both half-Tabasaran.
- Rustam Muradov, Colonel General in the Russian Armed Forces.
- Zumrud Khanmagomedova, the first Tabasaran woman who received a higher education and the first Tabasaran poetess.
