= Kondik =

Kondik Кондик Гъвандикк
- Selo
- Location within Republic of Dagestan Location within Russia
- Coordinates: 41°47′N 47°52′E
- Country: Russia
- Region: Republic of Dagestan
- District: Khasavyurtovsky District
- Time zone: UTC+3:00

Kondik (Russian: Кондик; Tabassaran: Гъвандикк) is a rural locality (a selo) and the administrative centre of Kondiksky Selsoviet, Khivsky District, Republic of Dagestan, Russia. Population: 1,457 (2010 census); 1,342 (2002 census); 1,150 (1989 Soviet census).

== Geography ==
Kondik is located 9 km northwest of Khiv (the district's administrative centre) by road. Tsuduk is the nearest rural locality.
