= Zildik =

Zildik Зильдик Цилдикк
- Selo
- Location within Republic of Dagestan Location within Russia
- Coordinates: 41°48′N 47°59′E
- Country: Russia
- Region: Republic of Dagestan
- District: Khasavyurtovsky District
- Time zone: UTC+3:00

Zildik (Russian: Зильдик; Tabassaran: Цилдикк) is a rural locality (a selo) in Khivsky District, Republic of Dagestan, Russia. Population: 524 (2021 census); 454 (2002 census); 489 (1989 Soviet census). There are 5 streets.

== Geography ==
Zildik is located 18 km northeast of Khiv (the district's administrative centre) by road. Mezhgyul is the nearest rural locality.
