= Kara Fatima Khanum =

19th century female chieftain from the Ottoman Empire

Kara Fatima Khanum 1
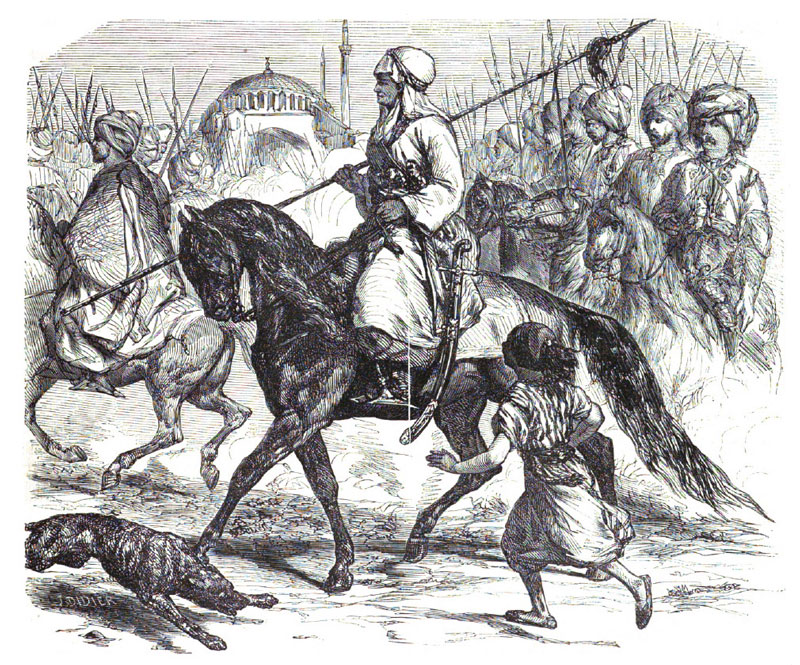
- Occupations: Tribal leader, military commander
- Years active: 1900s

Kara Fatima Khanum ("Black Lady Fatima") was a female chieftain known for volunteering in the Crimean War.

Specifics on her life are disputed and wrapped in obscurity. She was either a Kurd from the Sinemilli tribe from Marash. although there might have been multiple Kara Fatmas of different origins from different regions. According to Kurdish historian Mehmet Bayrak, she came from near Marash and is still remembered by Sinemilli Kurds as Fataraş or Fato Paşa, the first of which some of her descendants use as their surname. According to them, she was the sister of Kara Bilal, the leader of the Sinemilli tribe at the time, and had to relocate in the village of Emiruşağı after getting married.

It is proposed that she took part in the war to prove her loyalty to the Ottoman state following the imprisonment of her husband, the tribal leader.

She featured prominently in The Illustrated London News of 22 April 1854, which devotes a long article and a full-page illustration to her arrival, with a large retinue of mounted warriors of her tribe, in Constantinople. The Illustrated London News described her as:

The Queen, or Prophetess -- for she is endowed with supernatural attributes -- is a little dark old woman of about sixty, with nothing of the amazon in her appearance, although she wears what seems to be intended for male attire, and bestrides her steed like the warriors of her train. She is attended by two handmaids, like herself in masculine costume, and was brought across the Bosphorus, with a select band of followers, to a species of barrack in Stamboul.

Fatima Khanum arrived in Constantinople at the beginning of the Crimean war with a retinue of 300 horsemen "to request an audience with the padishah to show support and offer assistance." One German observer described her as having a "manly look". Fatima Khanum's exact dates appear uncertain, however, and scholar Michael Gunter has suggested that she fought in the Russo-Turkish war of 1877.

In 1887 the Chicago Tribune described Kara Fatima as 'The Redoubtable female warrior of Kurdistan'. The newspaper notes that the Ottoman government provided her with a monthly stipend and describes her as 'tall, thin, with a brown, hawklike face; her cheeks are the colour of parchment, and her face is reamed with scars. Wearing the national dress of the sterner sex, she looks like a man of 40, not like a woman who will never again see 75.'
