= Mosrentgen =

Mosrentgen Мосрентген
- Settlement
- Location within Moscow Location within Russia
- Coordinates: 55°36′49″N 37°28′11″E
- Country: Russia
- Region: Moscow
- District: Novomoskovsky Administrative Okrug
- Time zone: UTC+03:00

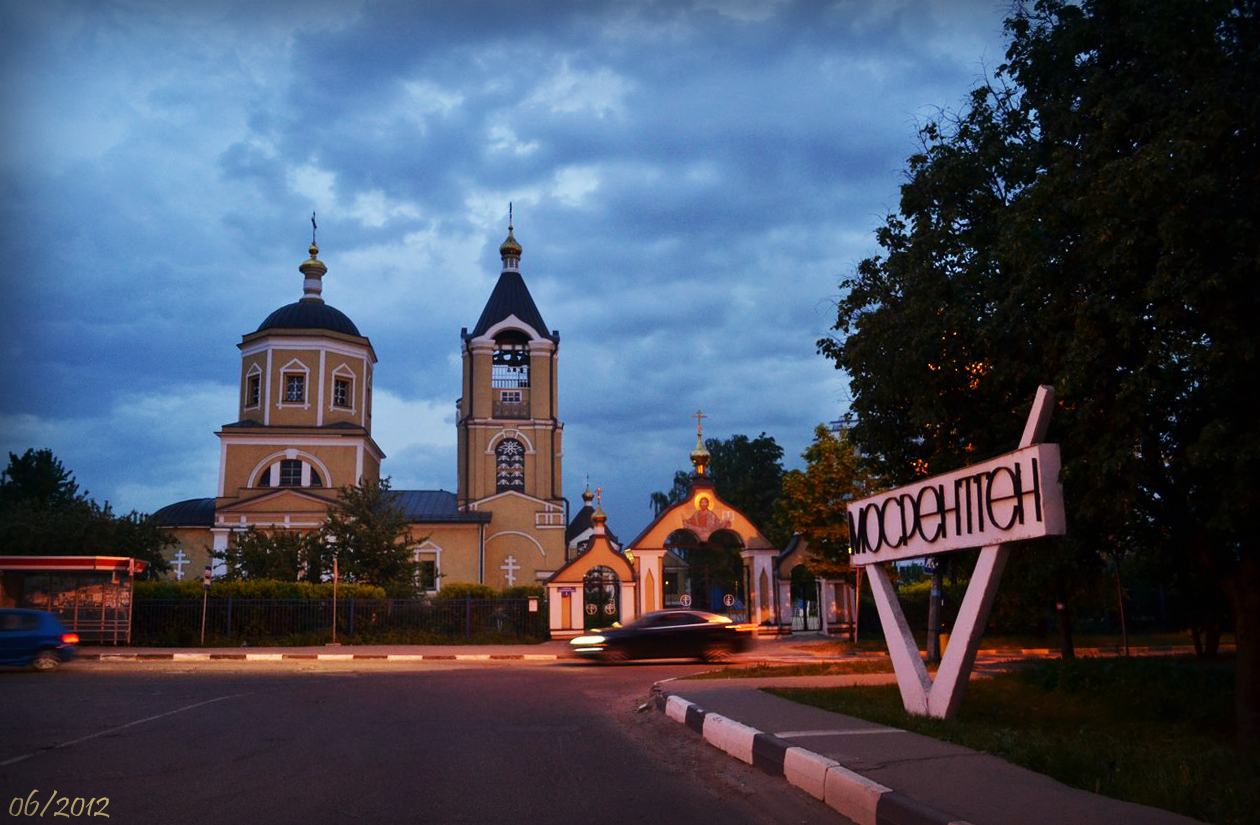
Church of the Holy Trinity, Mosrentgen

Mosrentgen (Russian: Мосрентген), known officially as Posolok zavoda Mosrentgen (Russian: Посёлок завода Мосрентген), is a settlement in Mosrentgen Settlement, Novomoskovsky Administrative Okrug of the federal city of Moscow, Russia. Population: 16,462 (2010 census); 10,336 (2002 census);
