= Khiv =

Rural locality in Dagestan, Russia

Coordinates: 41°45′18″N 47°55′52″E

Khiv (Russian: Хив, Tabassaran: Хив) is a rural locality (a selo) and the administrative center of Khivsky District of the Republic of Dagestan, Russia. Population: 2,659 (2010 census); 2,243 (2002 census); 2,162 (1989 Soviet census).
