= Khivsky District =

Khivsky District Хивский район (Russian)
- District

Other transcription(s)
  - Tabassaran and Lezgian: Хив район
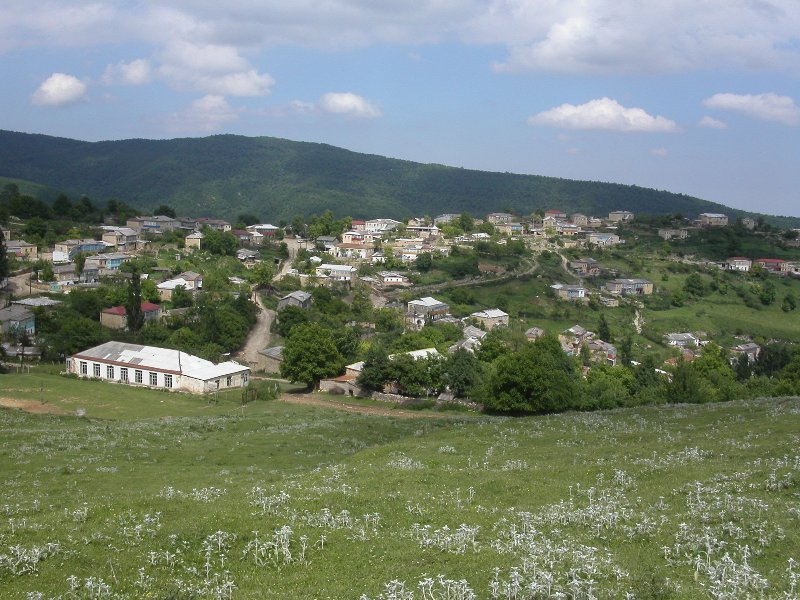
- The selo of Kug in Khivsky District

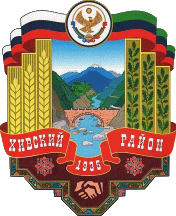
- Coat of arms
- Location of Khivsky District in the Republic of Dagestan
- Coordinates: 41°45′N 47°56′E
- Country: Russia
- Federal subject: Republic of Dagestan
- Established: 23 March 1935
- Administrative center: Khiv

Area
  - Total: 620 km^{2} (240 sq mi)

Population (2010 Census)
  - Total: 22,753
  - Density: 37/km^{2} (95/sq mi)
  - Urban: 0%
  - Rural: 100%

Administrative structure
  - Administrative divisions: 11 Selsoviets
  - Inhabited localities: 42 rural localities

Municipal structure
  - Municipally incorporated as: Khivsky Municipal District
  - Municipal divisions: 0 urban settlements, 16 rural settlements
- Time zone: UTC+3 (MSK)
- OKTMO ID: 82655000
- Website: http://www.mo-khivskiy.ru

Population of Khivsky District
- 2010 Census: 22,753
- 2002 Census: 20,747
- 1989 Census: 16,961
- 1979 Census: 19,862

Khivsky District (Russian: Хи́вский райо́н) is an administrative and municipal district (raion), one of the forty-one in the Republic of Dagestan, Russia. It is located in the southeast of the republic. The area of the district is 620 square kilometers (240 sq mi). Its administrative center is the rural locality (a selo) of Khiv. As of the 2010 Census, the total population of the district was 22,753, with the population of Khiv accounting for 11.7% of that number.

== Administrative and municipal status ==
Within the framework of administrative divisions, Khivsky District is one of the forty-one in the Republic of Dagestan. The district is divided into eleven selsoviets which comprise forty-two rural localities. As a municipal division, the district is incorporated as Khivsky Municipal District. Its eleven selsoviets are incorporated as sixteen rural settlements within the municipal district. The selo of Khiv serves as the administrative center of both the administrative and municipal district.
