= Musrukh =

Musrukh Мусрух
- Selo
- Location within Republic of Dagestan Location within Russia
- Coordinates: 42°19′N 46°31′E
- Country: Russia
- Region: Republic of Dagestan
- District: Shamilsky District
- Time zone: UTC+3:00

Musrukh (Russian: Мусрух) is a rural locality (a selo) in Shamilsky District, Republic of Dagestan, Russia. Population: 64 (2021 census); 84 (2002 census); 79 (1989 Soviet census). There is 1 street in this selo.

== Geography ==
This rural locality is located 13 km from Khebda (the district's administrative centre), 108 km from Makhachkala (capital of Dagestan) and 1,662 km from Moscow. Rugelda is the nearest rural locality.
