= Khonokh, Shamilsky District, Republic of Dagestan =

Khonokh Хонох
- Selo
- Location within Republic of Dagestan Location within Russia
- Coordinates: 42°18′N 46°30′E
- Country: Russia
- Region: Republic of Dagestan
- District: Shamilsky District
- Time zone: UTC+3:00

Khonokh (Russian: Хонох) is a rural locality (a selo) in Shamilsky District, Republic of Dagestan, Russia. Population: 98 (2021 census); 138 (2002 census); 134 (1989 Soviet census). There is 1 street in this selo.

== Geography ==
This rural locality is located 15 km from Khebda (the district's administrative centre), 109 km from Makhachkala (capital of Dagestan) and 1,664 km from Moscow. Rugelda is the nearest rural locality.
