= Khuchada =

Khuchada Хучада
- Selo
- Location within Republic of Dagestan Location within Russia
- Coordinates: 42°24′N 46°10′E
- Country: Russia
- Region: Republic of Dagestan
- District: Shamilsky District
- Time zone: UTC+3:00

Khuchada (Russian: Хучада) is a rural locality (a selo) in Shamilsky District, Republic of Dagestan, Russia. Population: 435 (2021 census); 238 (2002 census); 254 (1989 Soviet census). There are 3 streets in this selo.

== Geography ==
This rural locality is located 8 km from Khebda (the district's administrative centre), 105 km from Makhachkala (capital of Dagestan) and 1,653 km from Moscow. Tsekob is the nearest rural locality.
