= Somoda =

Somoda Сомода
- Selo
- Location within Republic of Dagestan Location within Russia
- Coordinates: 42°18′N 46°31′E
- Country: Russia
- Region: Republic of Dagestan
- District: Shamilsky District
- Time zone: UTC+3:00

Somoda (Russian: Сомода) is a rural locality (a selo) in Shamilsky District, Republic of Dagestan, Russia. Population: 200 (2021 census); 200 (2002 census); 200 (1989 Soviet census). There are 3 streets in this selo.

== Geography ==
This rural locality is located 16 km from Khebda (the district's administrative centre), 108 km from Makhachkala (capital of Dagestan) and 1,666 km from Moscow. Rugelda is the nearest rural locality.
