= Kienikh =

Kienikh Киэних
- Khutor
- Location within Republic of Dagestan Location within Russia
- Coordinates: 42°25′N 46°40′E
- Country: Russia
- Region: Republic of Dagestan
- District: Shamilsky District
- Time zone: UTC+3:00

Kienikh (Russian: Киэних) is a rural locality (a khutor) in Shamilsky District, Republic of Dagestan, Russia. Population: 22 (2021 census); 17 (2002 census); 12 (1989 Soviet census). There is 1 street in this khutor.

== Geography ==
This rural locality is located 10 km from Khebda (the district's administrative centre), 91 km from Makhachkala (capital of Dagestan) and 1,657 km from Moscow. Nizhny Kolob is the nearest rural locality.
