= Khotoda =

Khotoda Хотода
- Selo
- Location within Republic of Dagestan Location within Russia
- Coordinates: 42°23′N 46°33′E
- Country: Russia
- Region: Republic of Dagestan
- District: Shamilsky District
- Time zone: UTC+3:00

Khotoda (Russian: Хотода) is a rural locality (a selo) in Shamilsky District, Republic of Dagestan, Russia. Population: 1,037 (2021 census); 810 (2002 census); 672 (1989 Soviet census). There are 10 streets in this selo.

== Geography ==
This rural locality is located 6 km from Khebda (the district's administrative centre), 100 km from Makhachkala (capital of Dagestan) and 1,657 km from Moscow. Urada is the nearest rural locality.
