= Assab, Republic of Dagestan =

Assab Ассаб
- Selo
- Location within Republic of Dagestan Location within Russia
- Coordinates: 42°28′N 46°29′E
- Country: Russia
- Region: Republic of Dagestan
- District: Shamilsky District
- Time zone: UTC+3:00

Assab (Russian: Ассаб) is a rural locality (a selo) in Shamilsky District, Republic of Dagestan, Russia. Population: 1,591 (2021 census); 1,413 (2002 census); 831 (1989 Soviet census). There are 6 streets in this selo.

== Geography ==
Selo is located 6 km from Khebda (the district's administrative centre), 99 km from Makhachkala (capital of Dagestan) and 1,647 km from Moscow. Verkhny Batlukh is the nearest rural locality.
