= Dagbash =

Dagbash Дагбаш
- Selo
- Location within Republic of Dagestan Location within Russia
- Coordinates: 42°22′N 46°21′E
- Country: Russia
- Region: Republic of Dagestan
- District: Shamilsky District
- Time zone: UTC+3:00

Dagbash (Russian: Дагбаш) is a rural locality (a selo) in Shamilsky District, Republic of Dagestan, Russia. Population: 262 (2021 census); 239 (2002 census); 218 (1989 Soviet census). There is 1 street in this selo.

== Geography ==
This rural locality is located 18 km from Khebda (the district's administrative centre), 115 km from Makhachkala (capital of Dagestan) and 1,651 km from Moscow. Ratlub is the nearest rural locality.
