= Khindakh, Shamilsky District, Republic of Dagestan =

Khindakh Хиндах
- Selo
- Location within Republic of Dagestan Location within Russia
- Coordinates: 42°20′N 46°30′E
- Country: Russia
- Region: Republic of Dagestan
- District: Shamilsky District
- Time zone: UTC+3:00

Khindakh (Russian: Хиндах) is a rural locality (a selo) in Shamilsky District, Republic of Dagestan, Russia. Population: 109 (2021 census); 114 (2002 census); 103 (1989 Soviet census).

== Geography ==
This rural locality is located 13 km from Khebda (the district's administrative centre), 108 km from Makhachkala (capital of Dagestan) and 1,661 km from Moscow. Urchukh is the nearest rural locality.
