= Goor-Khindakh =

Goor-Khindakh Гоор-Хиндах
- Selo
- Location within Republic of Dagestan Location within Russia
- Coordinates: 42°26′N 46°35′E
- Country: Russia
- Region: Republic of Dagestan
- District: Shamilsky District
- Time zone: UTC+3:00

Goor-Khindakh (Russian: Гоор-Хиндах) is a rural locality (a selo) in Shamilsky District, Republic of Dagestan, Russia. Population: 187 (2021 census); 163 (2002 census); 130 (1989 Soviet census). There is 1 street in this selo.

== Geography ==
Selo is located 2 km from Khebda (the district's administrative centre), 95 km from Makhachkala (capital of Dagestan) and 1,652 km from Moscow. Goor is the nearest rural locality.
