= Verkhny Kolob =

Verkhny Kolob Верхний Колоб
- Selo
- Location within Republic of Dagestan Location within Russia
- Coordinates: 42°25′N 46°39′E
- Country: Russia
- Region: Republic of Dagestan
- District: Shamilsky District
- Time zone: UTC+3:00

Verkhny Kolob (Russian: Верхний Колоб) is a rural locality (a selo) in Shamilsky District, Republic of Dagestan, Russia. Population: 72 (2021 census); 81 (2002 census); 80 (1989 Soviet census). There are 2 streets in this selo.

== Geography ==
Selo is located 9 km from Khebda (the district's administrative centre), 92 km from Makhachkala (capital of Dagestan) and 1,657 km from Moscow. Nizhny Kolob is the nearest rural locality.
