= Tlyakh =

Tlyakh Тлях
- Selo
- Location within Republic of Dagestan Location within Russia
- Coordinates: 42°23′N 46°32′E
- Country: Russia
- Region: Republic of Dagestan
- District: Shamilsky District
- Time zone: UTC+3:00

Tlyakh (Russian: Тлях) is a rural locality (a selo) in Shamilsky District, Republic of Dagestan, Russia. Population: 264 (2021 census); 208 (2002 census); 182 (1989 Soviet census). There is 1 street in this selo.

== Geography ==
This rural locality is located 6 km from Khebda (the district's administrative centre), 102 km from Makhachkala (capital of Dagestan) and 1,657 km from Moscow. Machada is the nearest rural locality.
