= Tlyanub =

Tlyanub Тлянуб
- Selo
- Location within Republic of Dagestan Location within Russia
- Coordinates: 42°26′N 46°27′E
- Country: Russia
- Region: Republic of Dagestan
- District: Shamilsky District
- Time zone: UTC+3:00

Tlyanub (Russian: Тлянуб) is a rural locality (a selo) in Shamilsky District, Republic of Dagestan, Russia. Population: 294 (2021 census); 229 (2002 census); 194 (1989 Soviet census). There are 3 streets in this selo.

== Geography ==
This rural locality is located 8 km from Khebda (the district's administrative centre), 104 km from Makhachkala (capital of Dagestan) and 1,649 km from Moscow. Tsekob is the nearest rural locality.
