= Andykh =

Andykh Андых
- Selo
- Location within Republic of Dagestan Location within Russia
- Coordinates: 42°30′N 46°35′E
- Country: Russia
- Region: Republic of Dagestan
- District: Shamilsky District
- Time zone: UTC+3:00

Andykh (Russian: Андых) is a rural locality (a selo) in Shamilsky District, Republic of Dagestan, Russia. Population: 984 (2021 census); 853 (2002 census); 648 (1989 Soviet census). There is 1 street in this selo.

== Geography ==
Selo is located 8 km from Khebda (the district's administrative centre), 90 km from Makhachkala (capital of Dagestan) and 1,646 km from Moscow. Kuanib is the nearest rural locality.
