= Genitsurib =

Genitsurib Геницуриб
- Selo
- Location within Republic of Dagestan Location within Russia
- Coordinates: 42°25′N 46°42′E
- Country: Russia
- Region: Republic of Dagestan
- District: Shamilsky District
- Time zone: UTC+3:00

Genitsurib (Russian: Геницуриб) is a rural locality (a selo) in Shamilsky District, Republic of Dagestan, Russia. Population: 140 (2021 census); 110 (2002 census); 77 (1989 Soviet census).

== Geography ==
Selo is located 13 km from Khebda (the district's administrative centre), 89 km from Makhachkala (capital of Dagestan) and 1,659 km from Moscow. Ziurib is the nearest rural locality.
