= Genta, Republic of Dagestan =

Genta Гента
- Selo
- Location within Republic of Dagestan Location within Russia
- Coordinates: 42°22′N 46°33′E
- Country: Russia
- Region: Republic of Dagestan
- District: Shamilsky District
- Time zone: UTC+3:00

Genta (Russian: Гента) is a rural locality (a selo) in Shamilsky District, Republic of Dagestan, Russia. Population: 645 (2021 census); 527 (2002 census); 536 (1989 Soviet census). There are 5 streets in this selo.

== Geography ==
Selo is located 8 km from Khebda (the district's administrative centre), 102 km from Makhachkala (capital of Dagestan) and 1,660 km from Moscow. Urada is the nearest rural locality.
