= Goor, Republic of Dagestan =

Goor Гоор
- Selo
- Location within Republic of Dagestan Location within Russia
- Coordinates: 42°25′N 46°34′E
- Country: Russia
- Region: Republic of Dagestan
- District: Shamilsky District
- Time zone: UTC+3:00

Goor (Russian: Гоор) is a rural locality (a selo) in Shamilsky District, Republic of Dagestan, Russia. Population: 707 (2021 census); 714 (2002 census); 778 (1989 Soviet census). There is 1 street in this selo.

== Geography ==
Selo is located 2 km from Khebda (the district's administrative centre), 97 km from Makhachkala (capital of Dagestan) and 1,653 km from Moscow. Goor-Khindakh is the nearest rural locality.
