= Genta =

Genta may refer to:

== People ==
Given name

- Genta Alparedo (born 2001), Indonesian professional footballer
- Genta H. Holmes (born 1940), American professor of diplomacy
- Genta Ismajli (born 1984), Albanian singer
- Kazekenō Genta (風賢央 厳太; born 1999), Japanese professional sumo wrestler
- Genta Koja (古謝 玄太; born 1983), Japanese politician
- Genta Masuno (増野 元太; born 1993), Japanese athlete specialising in the 110 metres hurdles
- Genta Matsuda (松田 元太; born 1999), Japanese member of Travis Japan
- Genta Matsuo (松尾 元太; born 1986), Japanese footballer
- Genta Miura (三浦 弦太; born 1995), Japanese footballer
- Genta Omotehara (表原 玄太; born 1996), Japanese footballer

Surname

- Gérald Genta (born 1931), Swiss designer
- Giancarlo Genta (born 1948), Italian professor of mechanics
- Jordán Bruno Genta (1909–1974), Argentine Catholic writer, philosopher, journalist and educator
- Mario Genta (1912–1993), Italian footballer
- Roberto Genta (1907–1985), Argentine sprinter

== Characters ==
- Genta Kojima, fictional character in the Case Closed manga and anime series
- Genta Umemori, fictional character in the Samurai Sentai Shinkenger

== Places ==
- Genta Buana Paramita Indonesian production house founded in 1988
- Genta, Republic of Dagestan, a rural locality in Russia

== Other uses ==
- Genta (company), biotechnology company
- Gentamicin, an aminoglycoside antibiotic
