= Nitab =

Nitab Нитаб
- Selo
- Location within Republic of Dagestan Location within Russia
- Coordinates: 42°31′N 46°37′E
- Country: Russia
- Region: Republic of Dagestan
- District: Shamilsky District
- Time zone: UTC+3:00

Nitab (Russian: Нитаб) is a rural locality (a selo) in Shamilsky District, Republic of Dagestan, Russia. Population: 312 (2021 census); 234 (2002 census); 174 (1989 Soviet census). There is 1 street in this selo.

== Geography ==
This rural locality is located 11 km from Khebda (the district's administrative centre), 87 km from Makhachkala (capital of Dagestan) and 1,647 km from Moscow. Kuanib is the nearest rural locality.
