= Machada =

Machada Мачада
- Selo
- Location within Republic of Dagestan Location within Russia
- Coordinates: 42°22′N 46°32′E
- Country: Russia
- Region: Republic of Dagestan
- District: Shamilsky District
- Time zone: UTC+3:00

Machada (Russian: Мачада) is a rural locality (a selo) in Shamilsky District, Republic of Dagestan, Russia. Population: 801 (2021 census); 442 (2002 census); 448 (1989 Soviet census). There are 10 streets in this selo.

== Geography ==
This rural locality is located 7 km from Khebda (the district's administrative centre), 103 km from Makhachkala (capital of Dagestan) and 1,658 km from Moscow. Tlyakh is the nearest rural locality.
