= Magomed Ankalaev =

Russian mixed martial artist (born 1992)

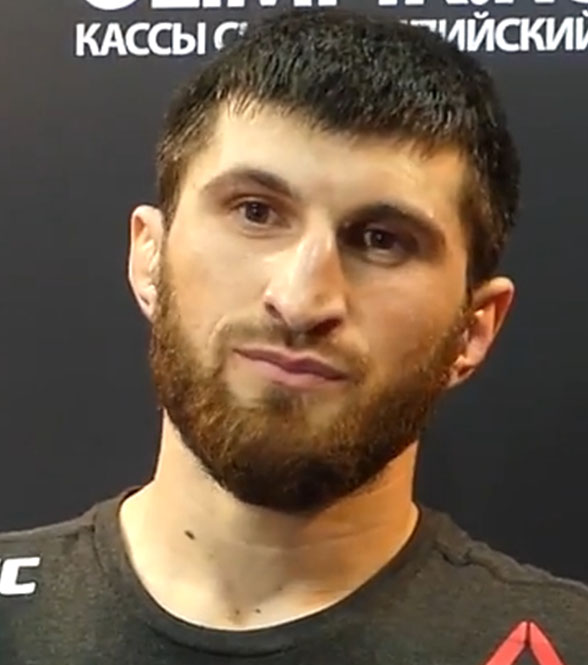
- Ankalaev in 2018
- Born: Magomed Alibulatovich Ankalaev; 2 June 1992 (age 34); Teletl, Dagestan, Russia
- Native name: Магомед Анкалаев
- Height: 6 ft 3 in (1.91 m)
- Weight: 205 lb (93 kg; 14.6 st)
- Division: Light Heavyweight
- Reach: 75 in (191 cm)
- Style: Combat Sambo
- Stance: Southpaw
- Fighting out of: Makhachkala, Dagestan, Russia
- Team: Fight Club Akhmat; Xtreme Couture Mixed Martial Arts
- Trainer: Sukhrab Magomedov (head coach); Shamil Alibatyrov
- Rank: International Master of Sport in Amateur MMA; Master of Sport in Combat Sambo
- Years active: 2014–present

Mixed martial arts record
- Total: 25
- Wins: 21
- By knockout: 11
- By decision: 10
- Losses: 2
- By knockout: 1
- By submission: 1
- Draws: 1
- No contests: 1

Other information
- University: DPSU
- Mixed martial arts record from Sherdog

Magomed Alibulatovich Ankalaev (Russian: Магомед Алибулатович Анкалаев; born 2 June 1992) is a Russian professional mixed martial artist. He currently competes in the Ultimate Fighting Championship (UFC), where he is a former UFC Light Heavyweight Champion. As of 20 June 2026, he is #2 in the Meta UFC light heavyweight rankings.

Ankalaev is the former light heavyweight champion of World Fighting Championship Akhmat. He is also the winner of 2016 Akhmat FC Light Heavyweight Grand Prix.

== Early life ==
Ankalaev was born on 2 June 1992, in Teletl, a village in the Shamilsky District of Dagestan in Russia, into an Avar family.

Ankalaev first began training in Greco-Roman wrestling for one year whilst he was a student at the Dagestan State Pedagogical University (DSPU) in Makhachkala, where he graduated in the sport faculty. At that time he also competed in combat sambo, where he was honoured with the title of Master of Sports in the discipline.

Ankalaev was compelled at the idea of transitioning to MMA, because of the similarity between MMA and combat sambo. Ankalaev then became the Russian and World champion in amateur MMA. Ankalaev was named the 2015 Mixed Martial Artist of Russia by the Russian MMA federation.

== Mixed martial arts career ==
=== Amateur MMA & combat sambo career ===
In December 2013, in the WMMAA's World Cup in Baku, Azerbaijan, Ankalaev won the gold medal, beating Kazakhstani Rustam Malaev in the finals.

In June 2014, at the Russian MMA Championship, Ankalaev ended up beating two of Fedor Emelianenko's students, Valentin Moldavsky in semi-final, and Vadim Nemkov in the finals; thereby qualifying for the WMMAA Championship in Minsk, Belarus, in September of the same year. He went on to win the silver medal.

In March 2015, Ankalaev won the finals of the MMA Cup of Dagestan, by beating Muslim Magomedov. Barely a month later, Magomed Ankalaev won the Russian Cup, by again beating his rival, Muslim Magomedov in the final. One month later, at the Russian MMA Championship, Ankalaev beat his old rival Valentin Moldavsky via split decision in the final, to win the gold medal. In November 2015, Ankalaev won the gold medal in the WMMAA World Championship held in Prague, Czech Republic.

In May 2016, Ankalaev won the Russian MMA Championship, by beating Magomed Shakhrudinov in tourney finals. In November of the same year, Ankalaev won the Combat Sambo Cup of Dagestan, and the gold medal in the WMMAA Championship a few weeks later, in Macau, China.

=== Early career ===
Ankalaev made his professional debut on 18 January 2014, at Oplot Challenge 96, where he beat Vasily Babich of Ukraine by majority decision. In December 2015, Ankalaev won the MMA Super Cup of Russia, by beating Nadyr Bulkadarov in the pro exhibition fight. At Akhmat FC in 2016, he won the Light Heavyweight Grand Prix. After winning the Chechen MMA promotion World Fighting Championship Akhmat's world title he signed with the UFC in October 2017.

=== Ultimate Fighting Championship ===
Ankalaev made his promotional debut against Paul Craig in March 2018 at UFC Fight Night: Werdum vs. Volkov. Ankalaev dominated the fight for the majority of the bout, winning with clean striking, takedowns and top control; Ankalaev had Craig badly hurt with a body kick in the first round. However, in the last five seconds of round three, Craig caught Ankalaev with a triangle choke, giving him his first professional loss at exactly 4:59 of round three.

Rebounding from this loss, Ankalaev was scheduled to fight Marcin Prachnio on 15 September 2018, at UFC Fight Night: Hunt vs. Oleinik. After a slow start, Ankalaev landed a right hook counter that knocked down Prachnio, who then got up, only to then be hit with a head kick and follow up punch which rendered him unconscious. The knockout earned Ankalaev his first UFC win and Performance of the Night award.

Ankalaev was expected to face Darko Stošić on 23 February 2019, at UFC Fight Night 145. However, Stošić pulled out of the fight on January 23 citing injury. Ankalaev instead faced promotional newcomer Klidson Abreu. Ankalaev won the fight by unanimous decision.

Ankalaev faced Dalcha Lungiambula on 9 November 2019, at UFC Fight Night 163. He won the fight via knockout in the third round. This fight earned him the Performance of the Night award.

Ankalaev faced Ion Cuțelaba on February 29, 2020, at UFC Fight Night 169. He won via a technical knockout in the first round. The win was not without controversy as referee Kevin MacDonald stopped the bout believing Cuțelaba was out on his feet while still standing, which Cuțelaba immediately protested. The stoppage was heavily criticized by media outlets, fighters, and fans as being premature. Consequently, the Virginia Department of Professional and Occupation Regulation (DPOR) reviewed the fight, denying Cuțelaba's appeal to overturn the loss.

A rematch against Cuțelaba was expected to take place on 15 August 2020, at UFC 252. Cuțelaba then pulled out on August 11 after testing positive for COVID-19 and the bout was rescheduled for UFC Fight Night 175. However, the day of the event, it was announced the fight was once again cancelled after Cuțelaba tested positive for COVID-19 for a second time. They eventually faced each other at UFC 254. Ankalaev won the fight via knockout in round one. This win earned him the Performance of the Night award.

Ankalev faced Nikita Krylov on 27 February 2021, at UFC Fight Night 186. He won the fight via unanimous decision.

Ankalaev was scheduled to face Volkan Oezdemir on 4 September 2021, at UFC Fight Night 191. The fight was later moved to UFC 267 in Abu Dhabi on 30 October 2021. He won the bout via unanimous decision.

Ankalaev faced Thiago Santos on 12 March 2022, at UFC Fight Night 203. He won the bout via unanimous decision.

Ankalaev next faced Anthony Smith on 30 July 2022, at UFC 277. He won the fight via technical knockout in the second round.

Ankalaev fought Jan Błachowicz for the vacant UFC Light Heavyweight Championship on 10 December 2022, at UFC 282. At first, it was booked as a 3-round co-main event, but then-reigning UFC Light Heavyweight champion Jiri Prochazka pulled out of his title defense against Glover Teixeira due to a shoulder injury and subsequently vacated his title, and the fight between Blachowicz and Ankalaev was changed to a 5-round title fight. The fight ended in a controversial split draw. 23 out of 25 media members scored the fight as a win for Ankalaev.

Ankalaev faced Johnny Walker at UFC 294. The fight ended in a no-contest after an illegal knee by Ankalaev and the cage-side doctor controversially deemed Walker was unable to continue the fight.

Due to the controversial ending, the pair quickly rematched at UFC Fight Night 234 on 13 January 2024. Ankalaev won the fight by knockout in the second round after dropping Walker with a right hand. This fight earned him the Performance of the Night award.

Ankalaev faced Aleksandar Rakić on 26 October 2024 at UFC 308. He won the fight via unanimous decision.

==== UFC Light Heavyweight Champion ====
Ankalaev faced Alex Pereira for the UFC Light Heavyweight Championship on 8 March 2025 at UFC 313. He won the championship by unanimous decision. 11 out of 21 media outlets scored the bout for Ankalaev.

Ankalaev made his first title defence against Alex Pereira in a rematch on 4 October 2025 at UFC 320. He lost the title by technical knockout via punches and elbows in the first round.

==== Post championship ====
Ankalaev was scheduled to face Khalil Rountree Jr. on 25 July 2026 in the main event at UFC Fight Night 282. However, on July 13, it was reported that Rountree Jr. had withdrawn from the bout due to injury, with Bogdan Guskov stepping in as a replacement. Ankalaev won the fight by technical knockout in the fifth round.

== Fighting style ==
Ankalaev is known for a disciplined striking style grounded in his background in Greco-Roman wrestling and Combat Sambo. While many Dagestani fighters lean heavily on grappling, Ankalaev has developed into a patient, counter-striking light heavyweight with a strong emphasis on distance management.

Though his wrestling credentials are strong, Ankalaev rarely rushes to use grappling offensively. Instead, he typically keeps the fight standing, using his takedown defense and balance to keep control of the pace. His approach has been described as calculated, sometimes even conservative, as he prefers to avoid unnecessary exchanges and pick his shots from the outside. That tactical mindset has allowed him to neutralize more aggressive fighters by staying composed under pressure and capitalizing on their mistakes.

== Personal life ==
Ankalaev lost his father when he was in the ninth or the tenth grade. He, as the oldest son, has three sisters and one brother.

He owns a coffee shop called "Ankl". He is a devout Muslim.

== Championships and accomplishments ==
=== Pro mixed martial arts ===
- Ultimate Fighting Championship
  - UFC Light Heavyweight Championship (One time, former)
    - First Russian UFC Light Heavyweight Champion
  - Performance of the Night (Four times) vs. Marcin Prachnio, Dalcha Lungiambula, Ion Cuțelaba, and Johnny Walker
  - Third longest win streak in UFC Light Heavyweight division history (9)
  - Second longest unbeaten streak in UFC Light Heavyweight division history (14) (behind Jon Jones)
    - Fifth longest unbeaten streak in UFC history (14)
  - Tied (Rashad Evans & Chuck Liddell) for fifth most wins in UFC Light Heavyweight division history (13)
  - Tied (Khalil Rountree Jr., Dustin Jacoby & Dominick Reyes) for third most knockouts in UFC Light Heavyweight division history (7)
- World Fighting Championship Akhmat
  - WFCA Light Heavyweight Champion (One time)
    - One successful title defense
  - 2016 Akhmat FC Light Heavyweight World Grand Prix Tournament Winner
- Russian MMA Union
  - MMA Super Cup of Russia 2015

=== Amateur MMA/combat sambo ===
- World MMA Association (WMMAA)
  - (gold) World Cup at Light Heavyweight (2013)
  - (silver) World Championship at Light Heavyweight (2014)
  - (gold) World Championship at Light Heavyweight (2015)
  - (gold) World Championship at Light Heavyweight (2016)
- Russian MMA Union
  - (gold) Russian MMA Championship at Light Heavyweight (2014)
  - (gold) Moscow Open Cup at Light Heavyweight (2014)
  - (gold) Super Cup of Russia at Light Heavyweight (2014)
  - (gold) MMA Cup of Dagestan at Light Heavyweight (2015)
  - (gold) Russian Cup: North Caucasian Federal District at Light Heavyweight (2015)
  - (gold) Russian MMA Championship at Light Heavyweight (2015)
  - (gold) Russian MMA Championship at Light Heavyweight (2016)
- Combat Sambo
  - (gold) Combat Sambo Cup of Dagestan at Light Heavyweight (2016)

== Mixed martial arts record ==
Professional record breakdown
25 matches	21 wins	2 losses
By knockout	11	1
By submission	0	1
By decision	10	0
Draws	1	
No contests	1	

Res.	Record	Opponent	Method	Event	Date	Round	Time	Location	Notes
Win	21–2–1 (1)	Bogdan Guskov	TKO (punches)	UFC Fight Night: Ankalaev vs. Guskov	July 25, 2026	5	2:41	Abu Dhabi, United Arab Emirates	
Loss	20–2–1 (1)	Alex Pereira	TKO (punches and elbows)	UFC 320	October 4, 2025	1	1:20	Las Vegas, Nevada, United States	Lost the UFC Light Heavyweight Championship.
Win	20–1–1 (1)	Alex Pereira	Decision (unanimous)	UFC 313	March 8, 2025	5	5:00	Las Vegas, Nevada, United States	Won the UFC Light Heavyweight Championship.
Win	19–1–1 (1)	Aleksandar Rakić	Decision (unanimous)	UFC 308	October 26, 2024	3	5:00	Abu Dhabi, United Arab Emirates	
Win	18–1–1 (1)	Johnny Walker	KO (punches)	UFC Fight Night: Ankalaev vs. Walker 2	January 13, 2024	2	2:42	Las Vegas, Nevada, United States	Performance of the Night.
NC	17–1–1 (1)	Johnny Walker	NC (illegal knee)	UFC 294	October 21, 2023	1	3:13	Abu Dhabi, United Arab Emirates	Accidental illegal knee rendered Walker unable to continue.
Draw	17–1–1	Jan Błachowicz	Draw (split)	UFC 282	December 10, 2022	5	5:00	Las Vegas, Nevada, United States	For the vacant UFC Light Heavyweight Championship.
Win	17–1	Anthony Smith	TKO (punches)	UFC 277	July 30, 2022	2	3:09	Dallas, Texas, United States	
Win	16–1	Thiago Santos	Decision (unanimous)	UFC Fight Night: Santos vs. Ankalaev	March 12, 2022	5	5:00	Las Vegas, Nevada, United States	
Win	15–1	Volkan Oezdemir	Decision (unanimous)	UFC 267	October 30, 2021	3	5:00	Abu Dhabi, United Arab Emirates	
Win	14–1	Nikita Krylov	Decision (unanimous)	UFC Fight Night: Rozenstruik vs. Gane	February 27, 2021	3	5:00	Las Vegas, Nevada, United States	
Win	13–1	Ion Cuțelaba	KO (punches)	UFC 254	October 24, 2020	1	4:19	Abu Dhabi, United Arab Emirates	Performance of the Night.
Win	12–1	Ion Cuțelaba	TKO (head kicks and punches)	UFC Fight Night: Benavidez vs. Figueiredo	February 29, 2020	1	0:38	Norfolk, Virginia, United States	
Win	11–1	Dalcha Lungiambula	KO (front kick and punch)	UFC Fight Night: Magomedsharipov vs. Kattar	November 9, 2019	3	0:29	Moscow, Russia	Performance of the Night.
Win	10–1	Klidson Abreu	Decision (unanimous)	UFC Fight Night: Błachowicz vs. Santos	February 23, 2019	3	5:00	Prague, Czech Republic	Catchweight (209 lb) bout; Abreu missed weight.
Win	9–1	Marcin Prachnio	TKO (head kick and punches)	UFC Fight Night: Hunt vs. Oleinik	September 15, 2018	1	3:09	Moscow, Russia	Performance of the Night.
Loss	8–1	Paul Craig	Submission (triangle choke)	UFC Fight Night: Werdum vs. Volkov	March 17, 2018	3	4:59	London, England	
Win	8–0	Celso Ricardo da Silva	KO (punches)	WFCA 43	October 4, 2017	1	1:11	Grozny, Russia	
Win	7–0	Wagner Prado	KO (punches)	WFCA 38	June 21, 2017	1	3:33	Grozny, Russia	Defended the WFCA Light Heavyweight Championship.
Win	6–0	Maxim Grishin	TKO (punches)	WFCA 30	October 4, 2016	4	1:13	Grozny, Russia	Won the vacant WFCA Light Heavyweight Championship.
Win	5–0	Artur Astakhov	Decision (unanimous)	WFCA 23	June 11, 2016	3	5:00	Grozny, Russia	
Win	4–0	Lloyd Marshbanks	TKO (submission to punches)	WFCA 18	April 9, 2016	1	0:15	Grozny, Russia	
Win	3–0	Dovletdzhan Yagshimuradov	Decision (unanimous)	Oplot Challenge 103	October 18, 2014	3	5:00	Moscow, Russia	
Win	2–0	Denić Strahinja	Decision (unanimous)	Tesla FC 4	June 14, 2014	3	5:00	Pančevo, Serbia	
Win	1–0	Vasily Babich	Decision (majority)	Oplot Challenge 96	January 18, 2014	3	5:00	Kharkiv, Ukraine	Light Heavyweight debut.

== Pay-per-view bouts ==
No.	Event	Fight	Date	Venue	City	PPV Buys
1.	UFC 282	Błachowicz vs. Ankalaev	10 December 2022	T-Mobile Arena	Las Vegas, Nevada, United States	Not Disclosed
2.	UFC 313	Pereira vs. Ankalaev	8 March 2025	T-Mobile Arena	Las Vegas, Nevada, United States	Not Disclosed
3.	UFC 320	Ankalaev vs. Pereira 2	4 October 2025	T-Mobile Arena	Las Vegas, Nevada, United States	Not Disclosed

== See also ==
- List of current UFC fighters
- List of male mixed martial artists

Achievements
Preceded by Alex Pereira	20th UFC Light Heavyweight Champion; 8 March 2025 – 4 October 2025	Succeeded by Alex Pereira
