= Tsekob =

Tsekob Цекоб
- Selo
- Location within Republic of Dagestan Location within Russia
- Coordinates: 42°25′N 46°26′E
- Country: Russia
- Region: Republic of Dagestan
- District: Shamilsky District
- Time zone: UTC+3:00

Tsekob (Russian: Цекоб) is a rural locality (a selo) in Shamilsky District, Republic of Dagestan, Russia. Population: 394 (2021 census); 82 (2002 census); 75 (1989 Soviet census). There is 1 streets in this selo.

== Geography ==
This rural locality is located 9 km from Khebda (the district's administrative centre), 105 km from Makhachkala (capital of Dagestan) and 1,650 km from Moscow. Tlyanub is the nearest rural locality.
