= Nizhny Batlukh =

Nizhny Batlukh Нижний Батлух
- Selo
- Location within Republic of Dagestan Location within Russia
- Coordinates: 42°29′N 46°31′E
- Country: Russia
- Region: Republic of Dagestan
- District: Shamilsky District
- Time zone: UTC+3:00

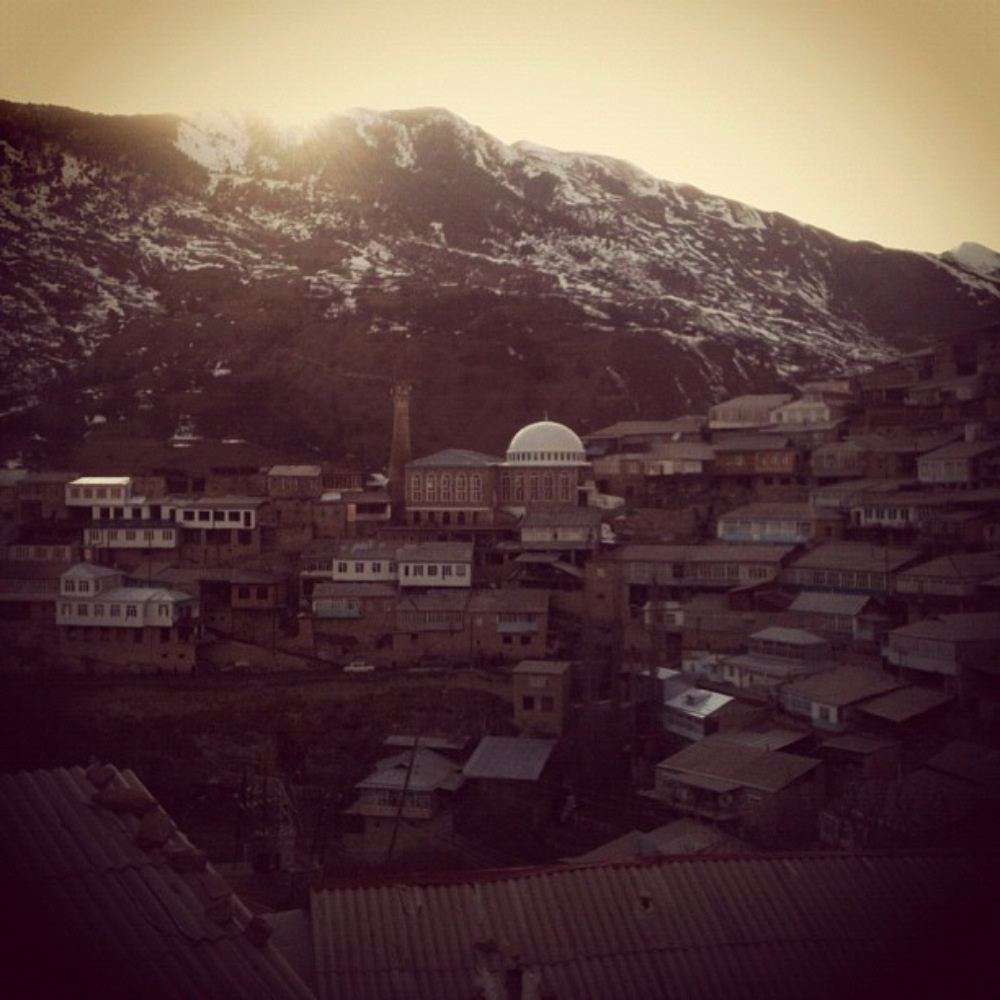
S. Nizhny Batlukh, Shamilsky district of the Republic of Dagestan

Nizhny Batlukh (Russian: Нижний Батлух) is a rural locality (a selo) in Shamilsky District, Republic of Dagestan, Russia. Population: 1,885 (2021 census); 1,653 (2002 census); 1,100 (1989 Soviet census). There are 5 streets in this selo.

== Geography ==
This rural locality is located 5 km from Khebda (the district's administrative centre), 96 km from Makhachkala (capital of Dagestan) and 1,646 km from Moscow. Verkhny Batlukh is the nearest rural locality.
