= Verkhny Batlukh =

Verkhny Batlukh Верхний Батлух
- Selo
- Location within Republic of Dagestan Location within Russia
- Coordinates: 42°29′N 46°30′E
- Country: Russia
- Region: Republic of Dagestan
- District: Shamilsky District
- Time zone: UTC+3:00

Verkhny Batlukh (Russian: Верхний Батлух) is a rural locality (a selo) in Shamilsky District, Republic of Dagestan, Russia. Population: 540 (2021 census); 543 (2002 census); 430 (1989 Soviet census). There is 1 street in this selo.

== Geography ==
Selo is located 7 km from Khebda (the district's administrative centre), 97 km from Makhachkala (capital of Dagestan) and 1,644 km from Moscow. Nizhny Batlukh is the nearest rural locality.
