= Teletl =

Teletl Телетль
- Selo
- Location within Republic of Dagestan Location within Russia
- Coordinates: 42°25′N 46°44′E
- Country: Russia
- Region: Republic of Dagestan
- District: Shamilsky District
- Time zone: UTC+3:00

Teletl (Russian: Телетль) is a rural locality (a selo) in Shamilsky District, Republic of Dagestan, Russia. Population: 3,313 (2021 census); 3,551 (2002 census); 1,873 (1989 Soviet census). There are 20 streets in this selo.

== Geography ==
This rural locality is located 15 km from Khebda (the district's administrative centre), 87 km from Makhachkala (capital of Dagestan) and 1,660 km from Moscow. Tlezda is the nearest rural locality.
