= Nakitl =

Nakitl Накитль
- Selo
- Location within Republic of Dagestan Location within Russia
- Coordinates: 42°30′N 46°39′E
- Country: Russia
- Region: Republic of Dagestan
- District: Khunzakhsky District
- Time zone: UTC+3:00

Nakitl (Russian: Накитль) is a rural locality (a selo) in Khunzakhsky Selsoviet, Khunzakhsky District, Republic of Dagestan, Russia. Population: 166 (2010 census); 174 (2002 census); 123 (1989 Soviet census). There are 2 streets in this selo.

== Geography ==
It is located 5 km from Khunzakh (the district's administrative centre), 86 km from Makhachkala (capital of Dagestan) and 1,649 km from Moscow. Nitab is the nearest rural locality.
