= Zaib, Republic of Dagestan =

Zaib Заиб
- Selo
- Location within Republic of Dagestan Location within Russia
- Coordinates: 42°29′N 46°42′E
- Country: Russia
- Region: Republic of Dagestan
- District: Khunzakhsky District
- Time zone: UTC+3:00

Zaib (Russian: Заиб) is a rural locality (a selo) in Khunzakhsky Selsoviet, Khunzakhsky District, Republic of Dagestan, Russia. Population: 224 (2010 census); 239 (2002 census); 183 (1989 Soviet census). There are 4 streets in this selo.

== Geography ==
It is located 6 km from Khunzakh (the district's administrative centre), 84 km from Makhachkala (capital of Dagestan) and 1,653 km from Moscow. Golotl is the nearest rural locality.
