= Ratlub =

Ratlub Ратлуб
- Selo
- Location within Republic of Dagestan Location within Russia
- Coordinates: 42°21′N 46°26′E
- Country: Russia
- Region: Republic of Dagestan
- District: Shamilsky District
- Time zone: UTC+3:00

Ratlub (Russian: Ратлуб) is a rural locality (a selo) in Shamilsky District, Republic of Dagestan, Russia. Population: 898 (2021 census); 961 (2002 census); 553 (1989 Soviet census). There are 3 streets in this selo.

== Geography ==
This rural locality is located 13 km from Khebda (the district's administrative centre), 111 km from Makhachkala (capital of Dagestan) and 1,656 km from Moscow. Zhalda is the nearest rural locality.
