= Verkhny Togokh =

Verkhny Togokh Верхний Тогох
- Selo
- Location within Republic of Dagestan Location within Russia
- Coordinates: 42°25′N 46°41′E
- Country: Russia
- Region: Republic of Dagestan
- District: Shamilsky District
- Time zone: UTC+3:00

Verkhny Togokh (Russian: Верхний Тогох) is a rural locality (a selo) in Shamilsky District, Republic of Dagestan, Russia. Population: 174 (2021 census); 172 (2002 census); 90 (1989 Soviet census). There is 1 street in this selo.

== Geography ==
Selo is located 12 km from Khebda (the district's administrative centre), 89 km from Makhachkala (capital of Dagestan) and 1,658 km from Moscow. Nizhny Togokh is the nearest rural locality.
