= Golotl =

Golotl Голотль
- Selo
- Location within Republic of Dagestan Location within Russia
- Coordinates: 42°29′N 46°44′E
- Country: Russia
- Region: Republic of Dagestan
- District: Shamilsky District
- Time zone: UTC+3:00

Golotl (Russian: Голотль) is a rural locality (a selo) in Shamilsky District, Republic of Dagestan, Russia. Population: 1,637 (2021 census); 1,363 (2002 census); 1,119 (1989 Soviet census). There are 33 streets in this selo.

== Geography ==
Selo is located 16 km from Khebda (the district's administrative centre), 82 km from Makhachkala (capital of Dagestan) and 1,654 km from Moscow. Zaib is the nearest rural locality.
