= Tidib =

Tidib Тидиб
- Selo
- Location within Republic of Dagestan Location within Russia
- Coordinates: 42°23′N 46°34′E
- Country: Russia
- Region: Republic of Dagestan
- District: Shamilsky District
- Time zone: UTC+3:00

Tidib (Russian: Тидиб) is a rural locality (a selo) in Shamilsky District, Republic of Dagestan, Russia. Population: 1,684 (2021 census); 1,073 (2002 census); 1,087 (1989 Soviet census). There are 18 streets in this selo.

== Geography ==
This rural locality is located 6 km from Khebda (the district's administrative centre), 100 km from Makhachkala (capital of Dagestan) and 1,658 km from Moscow. Urada is the nearest rural locality.
