= Oshiogawa stable (2022) =

Organization of sumo wrestlers

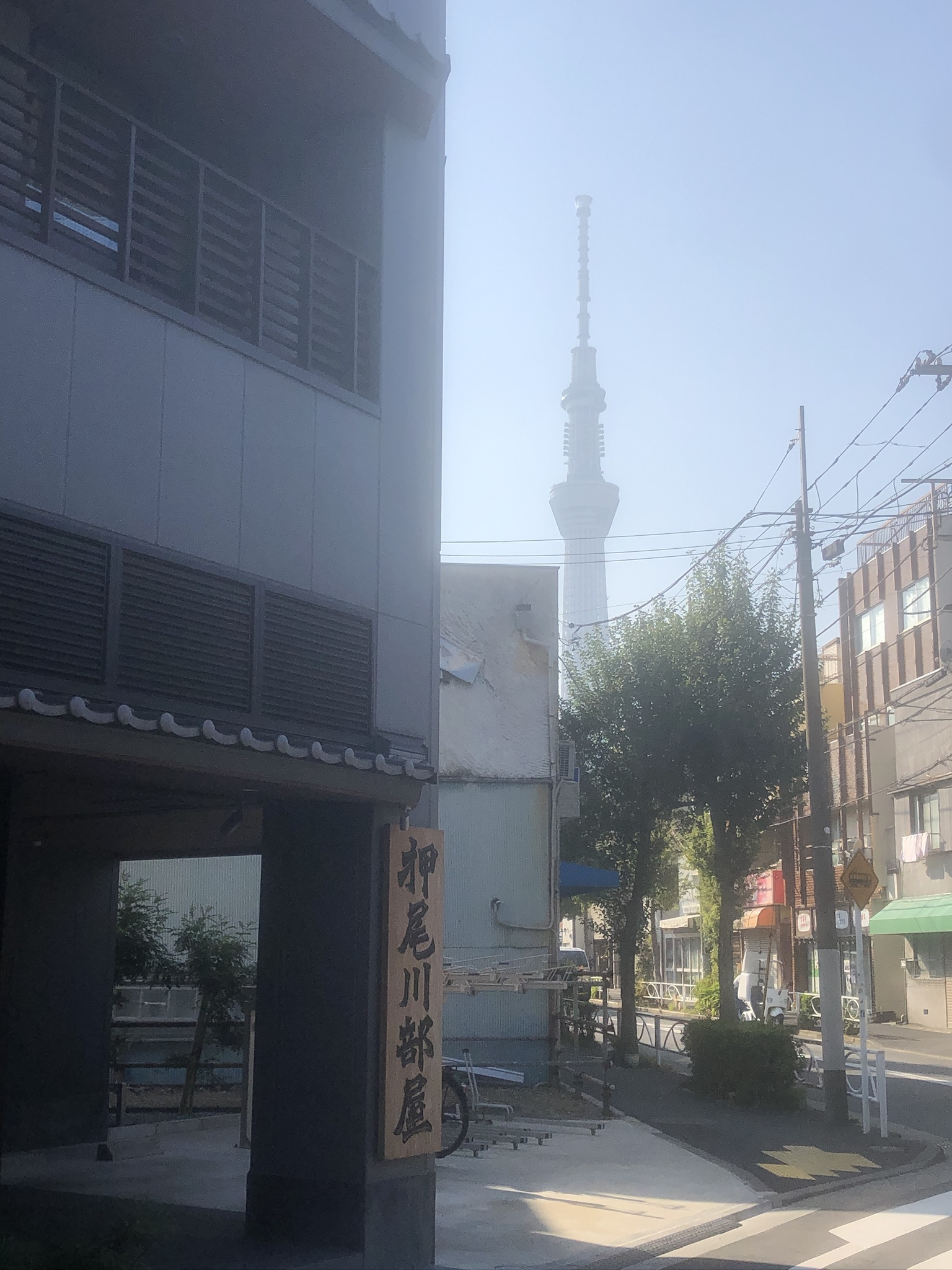
Stable with Tokyo Sky Tree in background

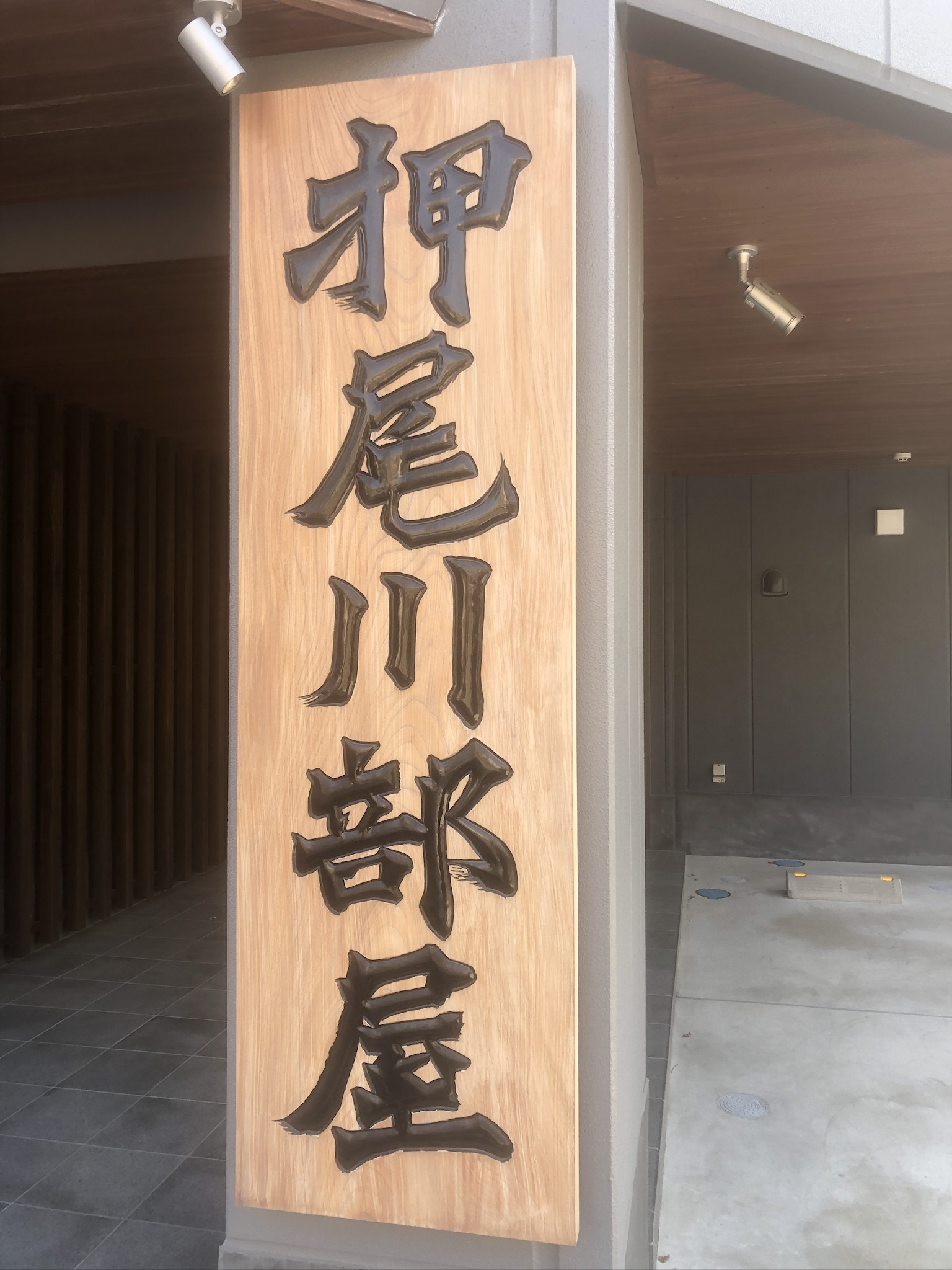

Oshiogawa stable (押尾川部屋, Oshiogawa-beya) is a stable of sumo wrestlers, one of the Nishonoseki group of stables. It broke off from Oguruma stable by its founder, sekiwake Takekaze, and officially opened in February 2022. The planned opening of the stable was first announced in April 2021, and was prompted by the imminent retirement of the head of Oguruma stable, ōzeki Kotokaze, who turned 65 years of age in April 2022.

As of May 2026, the stable has 12 active wrestlers.

== Ring name conventions ==
Oshiogawa has announced that all his recruits will have the kanji kaze (風, wind) as a prefix in their shikona. In Oguruma stable, it was used as a suffix.

== Owners ==
- 2022–Present: Oshiogawa Akira (iin, sekiwake Takekaze, born 1979)

== Coaches ==
- Oguruma Koichi (riji, ōzeki Kotokaze, born 1957)

== Assistant ==
- Nishikikaze (sewanin, makushita 1, real name Yasuyuki Adachi, born 1978)

== Notable active wrestlers ==
- Amakaze (best rank maegashira)
- Kazekenō (best rank jūryō)

== Notable former members ==
- Yago (former maegashira)

== Hairdresser ==
- Tokogō (first class tokoyama, born 1971)

== Location and access ==
Tokyo, Sumida ward, Bunka 3-6-3
6 minute walk from Omurai Station on Tobu Kameido Line

== See also ==
- List of sumo stables
- List of active sumo wrestlers
- List of past sumo wrestlers
- Glossary of sumo terms
