= Urada =

Urada Урада
- Selo
- Location within Republic of Dagestan Location within Russia
- Coordinates: 42°23′N 46°33′E
- Country: Russia
- Region: Republic of Dagestan
- District: Shamilsky District
- Time zone: UTC+3:00

Urada (Russian: Урада) is a rural locality (a selo) in Shamilsky District, Republic of Dagestan, Russia. Population: 2,412 (2021 census); 2,254 (2002 census); 1,486 (1989 Soviet census). There are 5 streets in this selo.

== Geography ==
This rural locality is located 7 km from Khebda (the district's administrative centre), 101 km from Makhachkala (capital of Dagestan) and 1,658 km from Moscow. Tidib is the nearest rural locality.
