= Amakaze Kentō =

Japanese sumo wrestler

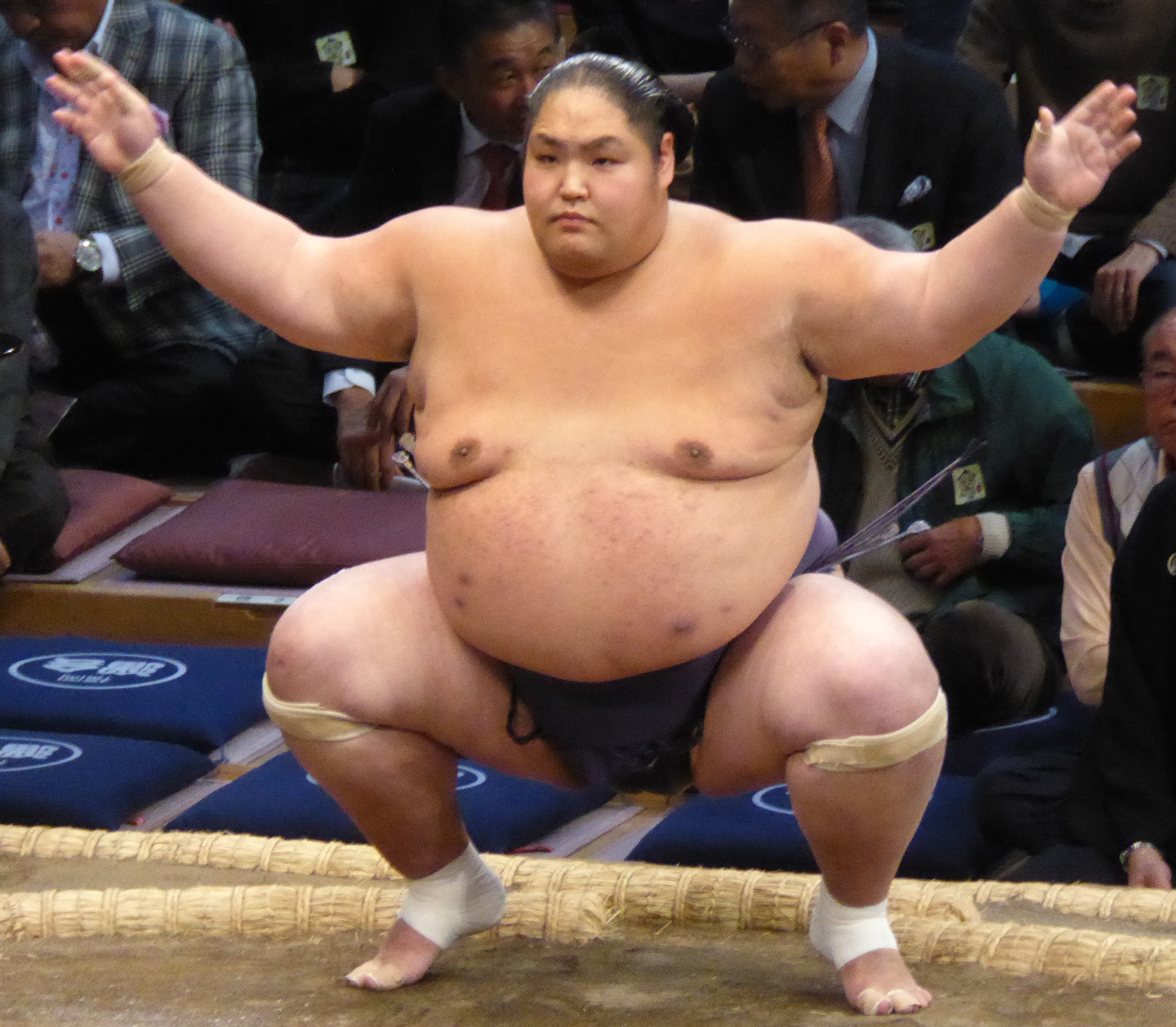

Personal information
- Native name: 天風 健人
- Born: Kentō Kawanari; July 7, 1991 (age 35) Kagawa, Japan
- Height: 184 cm (6 ft 1/2 in)
- Weight: 169.3 kg (373 lb; 26 st 9 lb)

Sport
- Sport: Sumo
- Rank: See below
- Heya: Oguruma→Oshiogawa
- Debut: March 2007
- Highest rank: Maegashira 13 (September 2016)
- Championships: 1 (Jūryō)
- Updated on November 3, 2025

Amakaze Kentō (Japanese: 天風 健人; born July 7, 1991 as Kentō Kawanari (川成 健人)) is a Japanese professional sumo wrestler from Kotohira, Kagawa. He made his professional debut in March 2007, joining Oguruma stable, and reached the top makuuchi division in September 2016. His highest rank has been maegashira 13. He has one jūryō division championship or yūshō.

== Career ==
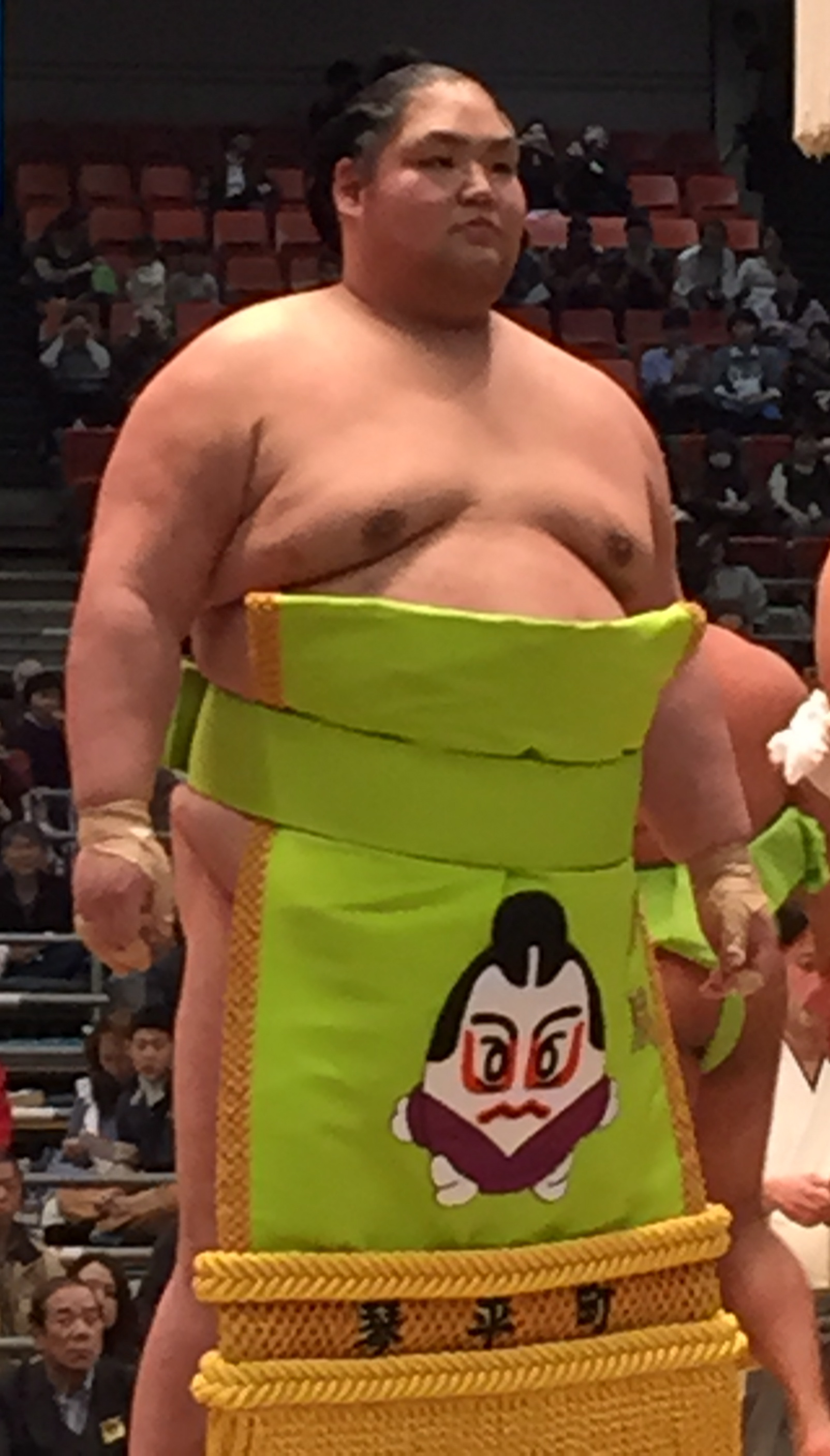
Amakaze in his debut jūryō tournament in March 2015

He had been active in judo since before elementary school, and won the Shikoku junior high school competition. He was spotted by former ozeki Kotokaze and recruited to his Oguruma stable at the age of 15. He made his debut in March 2007, fighting under his own surname of Kawanari. He was the first wrestler from Kagawa Prefecture since the retirement of Gokenzan in November 2006. He reached the sandanme division in 2008 and the third highest makushita division in 2009. He rose to the top of the makushita division in March 2013, where he was on the verge of promotion to elite sekitori status but fell short with a make-koshi or losing 1–6 record. He failed again at makushita 3 in November 2013, and then missed the January 2014 tournament through injury. After making attempts to lose weight his results began to improve and he earned promotion to the jūryō division after the January 2015 tournament.

To celebrate his promotion to sekitori status he changed his shikona from his real name to Amakaze. He chose the shikona himself, with "kaze" (wind) being a suffix used by all wrestlers at Oguruma stable, and "Ama" taken from Amanogawa (the Milky Way), because his birthday of July 7 coincides with the start of Tanabata (Star Festival) celebrations. The same kanji is also used for a river near his parents' home in Kotohira. He commented on his new name, "It means looking up to the heavens, it's good" but his stablemaster joked that he should take care not to become an "Ama-chan", or one who takes things lightly.

Amakaze came through with a winning record in his second division debut of ten wins against five losses, and in July 2016 he won the jūryō division championship or yūshō with a 13–2 record. This earned him promotion to the top makuuchi division for the first time, joining his veteran stablemates Takekaze and Yoshikaze. Working his way up the ranks Amakaze had served as a tsukebito, or personal attendant to Takekaze. Ranked at maegashira 13 in his makuuchi debut in September 2016, he managed only five wins against ten losses and was demoted straight back to jūryō. For the next eight tournaments he held his own in jūryō but did not look like earning promotion back to makuuchi. In March 2018 a poor 3–12 record caused his demotion to makushita which he followed up with another poor 2–6 record in May 2018. He injured his knee in his first bout in July 2018 and withdrew from the tournament. He did not compete again until March 2019, by which time he had fallen to the jonidan division. In this tournament he fought another former makuuchi wrestler, Terunofuji. He won promotion back to makushita for the January 2020 tournament, but fell to sandanme in March 2022.

== Personal ==
Amakaze is known for his sense of fun and love of food, and enjoys posting photos of himself and fellow wrestlers at leisure on social media. In 2015 a video of himself and two other wrestlers attempting a 40-yard dash while on a tour in Wakayama went viral.

== Fighting style ==
Amakaze is one of the heaviest wrestlers in sumo at 208 kg (459 lb; 32 st 11 lb), and likes to use his weight to his best advantage by grabbing his opponent's mawashi and forcing them out by yori-kiri. His preferred grip is hidari-yotsu, a right arm outside, left arm inside position. Roughly half of his winning bouts are with the yori-kiri technique. His other regular winning kimarite include oshi-dashi (push out) and hataki-komi (slap down).

== Career record ==
Amakaze Kentō
Year	January Hatsu basho, Tokyo	March Haru basho, Osaka	May Natsu basho, Tokyo	July Nagoya basho, Nagoya	September Aki basho, Tokyo	November Kyūshū basho, Fukuoka
2007	x	(Maezumō)	West Jonokuchi #20; 4–3	East Jonidan #114; 6–1	East Jonidan #34; 1–6	East Jonidan #72; 4–3
2008	West Jonidan #44; 5–2	East Jonidan #6; 5–2	West Sandanme #74; 5–2	West Sandanme #45; 3–4	East Sandanme #63; 4–3	East Sandanme #44; 2–5
2009	East Sandanme #72; 6–1	East Sandanme #18; 5–2	East Makushita #57; 4–3	West Makushita #47; 4–3	East Makushita #38; 2–5	East Makushita #54; 4–3
2010	West Makushita #47; 3–4	East Makushita #54; 2–5	West Sandanme #16; 4–3	West Sandanme #3; 4–3	East Makushita #51; 4–3	East Makushita #42; 3–4
2011	East Makushita #51; 3–4	West Makushita #59; Tournament Cancelled; Match fixing investigation 0–0–0	West Makushita #59; 4–3	East Makushita #38; 5–2	East Makushita #23; 2–5	West Makushita #33; 4–3
2012	West Makushita #28; 3–4	East Makushita #37; 3–4	West Makushita #49; 6–1	East Makushita #21; 4–3	East Makushita #16; 4–3	West Makushita #11; 5–2
2013	East Makushita #5; 4–3	West Makushita #1; 1–6	West Makushita #14; 5–2	East Makushita #9; 4–3	East Makushita #8; 5–2	East Makushita #3; 3–4
2014	East Makushita #6; Sat out due to injury 0–0–7	West Makushita #46; 6–1	West Makushita #20; 6–1	West Makushita #7; 3–4	East Makushita #12; 4–3	West Makushita #9; 6–1
2015	East Makushita #1; 4–3	West Jūryō #12; 10–5	West Jūryō #5; 6–9	West Jūryō #7; 6–9	East Jūryō #10; 7–8	West Jūryō #11; 6–9
2016	East Jūryō #13; 7–8	West Jūryō #13; 9–6	West Jūryō #9; 7–8	West Jūryō #11; 13–2; Champion	East Maegashira #13; 5–10	West Jūryō #1; 5–10
2017	West Jūryō #9; 9–6	West Jūryō #7; 6–9	West Jūryō #10; 9–6	East Jūryō #7; 7–8	East Jūryō #9; 8–7	West Jūryō #6; 6–9
2018	East Jūryō #8; 8–7	East Jūryō #7; 3–12	East Makushita #1; 2–6	West Makushita #13; 0–2–5	East Makushita #49; Sat out due to injury 0–0–7	West Sandanme #29; Sat out due to injury 0–0–7
2019	West Sandanme #90; Sat out due to injury 0–0–7	West Jonidan #50; 6–1	East Sandanme #84; 5–2	West Sandanme #49; 5–2	East Sandanme #27; 5–2	East Sandanme #3; 4–3
2020	East Makushita #55; 4–3	West Makushita #46; 4–3	East Makushita #36; Tournament Cancelled; State of Emergency; 0–0–0	East Makushita #36; 4–3	West Makushita #26; 4–3	East Makushita #20; 3–4
2021	East Makushita #29; 3–4	East Makushita #37; 4–3	East Makushita #27; 4–3	West Makushita #19; 3–4	East Makushita #27; 2–5	East Makushita #40; 3–4
2022	East Makushita #49; 2–5	East Sandanme #17; 5–2	East Makushita #53; Sat out due to injury 0–0–7	West Sandanme #33; Sat out due to injury 0–0–7	West Jonidan #3; 4–3	East Sandanme #74; 5–2
2023	East Sandanme #37; 3–4	West Sandanme #56; 5–2	East Sandanme #26; 4–3	East Sandanme #14; 4–3	West Sandanme #4; 5–2	West Makushita #40; 3–4
2024	East Makushita #51; 5–2	West Makushita #32; 1–6	East Sandanme #2; 5–2	East Makushita #38; 2–5	West Makushita #59; 2–5	West Sandanme #11; 2–5
2025	West Sandanme #39; 2–5	East Sandanme #65; 5–2	West Sandanme #34; 2–5	East Sandanme #65; 3–4	West Jonidan #6; 5–2	West Sandanme #52; 5–2
2026	East Sandanme #25; 1–6	East Sandanme #62; 6–1	East Sandanme #8; 1–6	East Sandanme #41; 2–5	East Sandanme #70; 3–4	West Jonidan #15; 4–3
Record given as wins–losses–absences Top division champion Top division runner-up Retired Non-participation Jūryō Lower divisions Sanshō key: F=Fighting spirit; O=Outstanding performance; T=Technique Also shown: ★=Kinboshi; P=Playoff(s); Divisions: Makuuchi — Jūryō — Makushita — Sandanme — Jonidan — Jonokuchi Makuuchi ranks: Yokozuna — Ōzeki — Sekiwake — Komusubi — Maegashira

== See also ==
- Glossary of sumo terms
- List of active sumo wrestlers
- List of heaviest sumo wrestlers
- List of sumo second division champions
