= Kimarite =

Term used for the technique used to win a sumo match

Kimarite (Japanese: 決まり手) is the technique used in sumo by a rikishi (wrestler) to win a match. It is officially decided or announced by the gyōji (referee) at the end of the match, though judges can modify this decision. The records of kimarite are then kept for statistical purposes.

The Japan Sumo Association (JSA) have officially recognized 82 such techniques since 2001, with five also recognized as winning non-techniques. However, only about a dozen of these are frequently and regularly used by rikishi.

A sumo match can still be won even without a kimarite, by the virtue of disqualification due to a kinjite (foul), such as striking with closed fist.

== Basic techniques ==
The basic techniques (基本技, kihonwaza) are some of the most common winning techniques in sumo, with the exception of abisetaoshi.

=== Abisetaoshi ===
Abisetaoshi (浴びせ倒し, 'backward force down') is a rarely used basic kimarite that pushes down the opponent into the ground back-first by leaning forward while grappling.

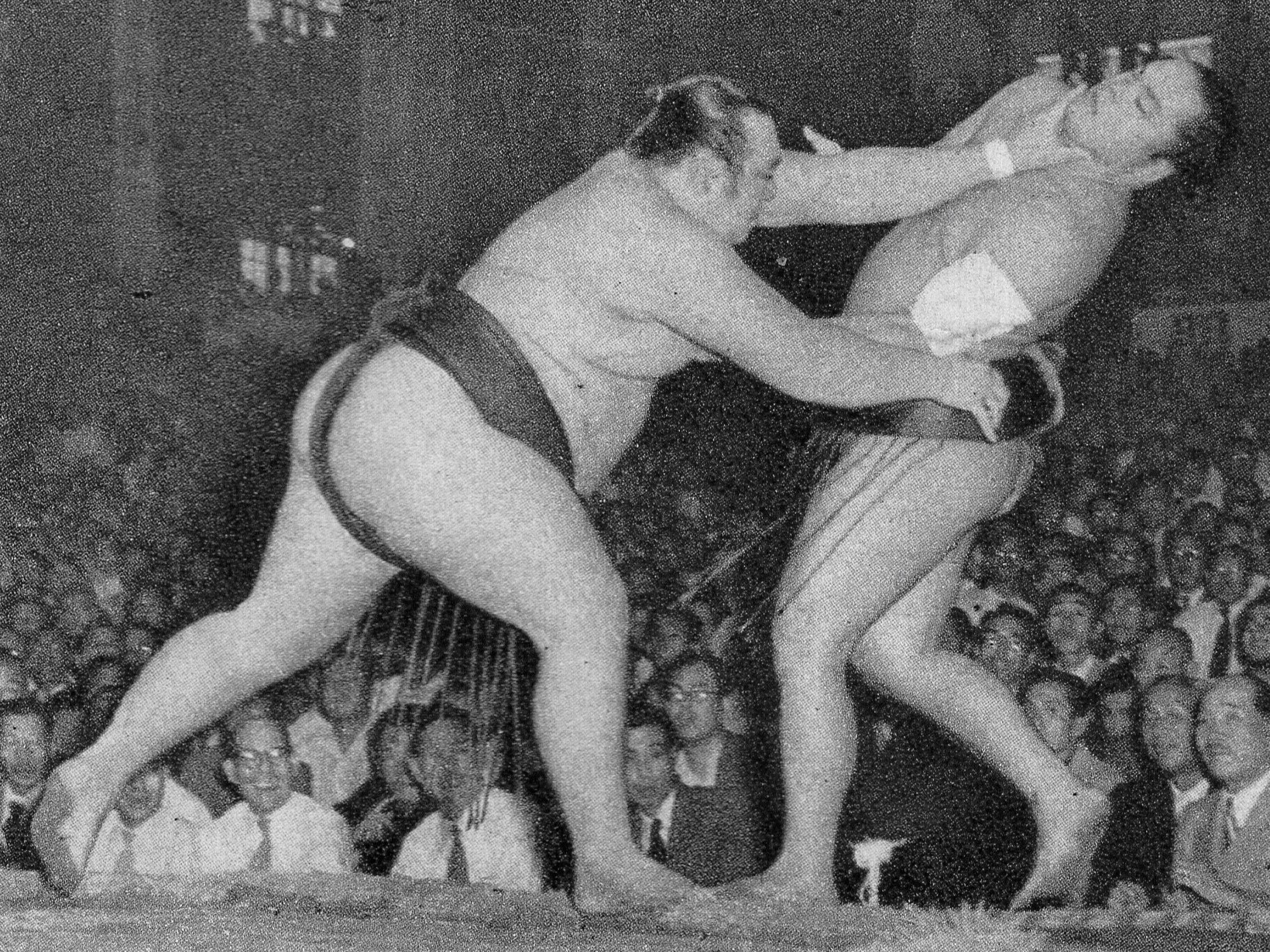
Oshidashi

=== Oshidashi ===
Oshidashi (押し出し, 'frontal push out') is a basic kimarite that requires pushing the opponent out of the ring using the arms, without holding their mawashi (belt). Contact is maintained as the opponent is pushed out.

=== Oshitaoshi ===
Oshitaoshi (押し倒し, 'frontal push down') is similar to an oshidashi, except that the opponent falls down (as opposed to standing).

=== Tsukidashi ===
Tsukidashi (突き出し, 'frontal thrust out') is a basic kimarite that uses a single or multiple hand thrusts to force the opponent out of the ring without maintaining any contact with the opponent.

=== Tsukitaoshi ===
Tsukitaoshi (突き倒し, 'frontal thrust down') is similar to a tsukidashi, except that the opponent falls down (as opposed to standing).

=== Yorikiri ===
Yorikiri (寄り切り, 'frontal force out') is a basic kimarite where the rikishi maintains a grip on their opponent's mawashi, or a full body grip, and forces them out of the ring. This is the most common kimarite in sumo and is the result of 32.4% of all professional matches.

=== Yoritaoshi ===
Yoritaoshi (寄り倒し, 'frontal crush out') is similar to a yorikiri, except that the opponent falls down out of the ring as a result (as opposed to standing), effectively crushing him out.

== Leg tripping ==
Leg tripping techniques (Japanese: 掛け手, romanized: kakete) are kimarite where the rikishi wins the match by tripping or grabbing their opponent's leg out of the ring.

=== Ashitori ===
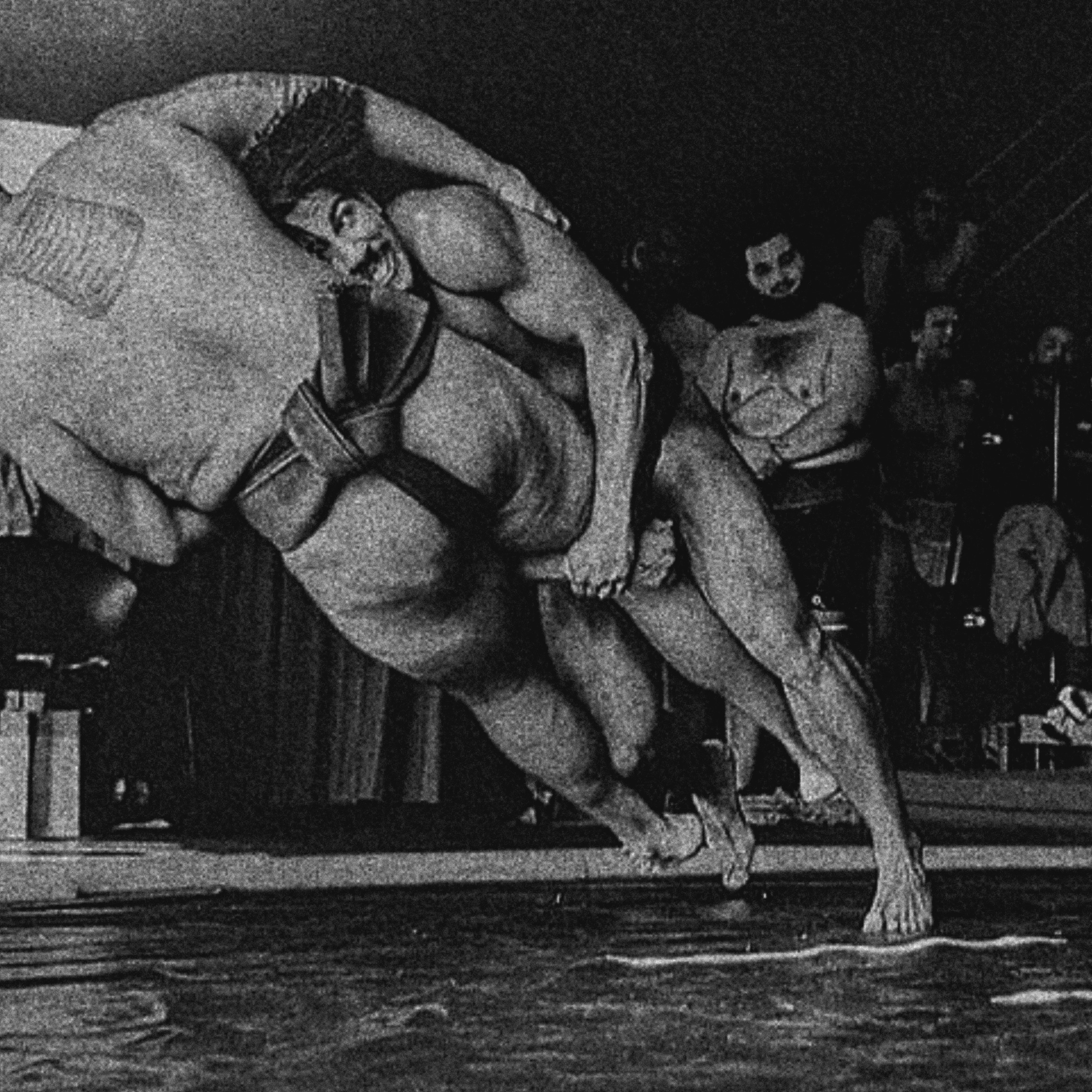
Amateur sumo wrestlers demonstrating ashitori

Ashitori (足取り; "leg pick") is a kimarite where the rikishi grabs one of their opponent's leg, resulting in a loss of balance, enabling the rikishi to force them out of the ring.

=== Chongake ===
Chongake (ちょん掛け; "pulling heel hook") is a kimarite where the rikishi trips their opponent through one of their heel by using their own heel, thereby resulting in a loss of balance and forcing their opponent to fall down back-first.

=== Kawazugake ===
Kawazugake (河津掛け; "hooking backward counter throw") is a kimarite where the rikishi wraps their leg around the opponent's leg of the opposite side and trips him backwards while grasping onto his upper body.

=== Kekaeshi ===
Kekaeshi (蹴返し; "minor inner foot sweep") is a kimarite which involves kicking the inside of the opponent's foot. This is usually accompanied by a quick pull that causes the opponent to lose balance and fall.

=== Ketaguri ===
Ketaguri (蹴手繰り; "pulling inside ankle sweep") is a kimarite in which, directly after the tachi-ai, the attacker kicks the opponent's legs to the outside and thrusts or twists him down to the dohyō.

=== Kirikaeshi ===
Kirikaeshi (切り返し; "twisting backward knee trip") is a kimarite in which the attacker places his leg behind the knee of the opponent, and while twisting the opponent sideways and backwards, sweeps him over the attacker's leg and throws him down.

=== Komatasukui ===
Komatasukui (小股掬い; "over thigh scooping body drop") is a kimarite in which an opponent responds to being thrown and puts his leg out forward to balance himself, grabbing the underside of the thigh and lifting it up, throwing the opponent down.

=== Kozumatori ===
Kozumatori (小褄取り; "ankle pick") is a kimarite in which an attacker lifts the opponent's ankle from the front, causing them to fall.

=== Mitokorozeme ===
Mitokorozeme (三所攻め; "triple attack force out") is a triple attack. Wrapping one leg around the opponent's (inside leg trip), grabbing the other leg behind the thigh, and thrusting the head into the opponent's chest, the attacker pushes him up and off the surface, then throwing him down on his back.

This is a very rare technique, first used in the modern era by Mainoumi Shūhei, who used it two or three times in the early 1990s (officially twice, on a third occasion his win was judged by most observers to be a mitokorozeme, but was officially judged an uchigake). Ishiura successfully used it against Nishikigi on Day 8 of the November 2019 tournament, for the first time in makuuchi since Mainoumi in 1993.

=== Nimaigeri ===
Nimaigeri (二枚蹴り; "ankle kicking twist down") is a kimarite in which the attacker kicks an off-balance opponent on the outside of their standing leg's foot, then throws him to the surface.

=== Ōmata ===
Ōmata (大股; "thigh scooping body drop") is a kimarite in which, when the opponent escapes from a komatsukui by extending the other foot, the attacker switches to lift the opponent's other off-balance foot and throws him down.

=== Sotogake ===
Sotogake (外掛; "outside leg trip") is a kimarite in which the attacker wraps his calf around the opponent's calf from the outside and drives him over backwards.

Lyoto Machida, with a sumo background, has successfully used this multiple times in the course of his mixed martial arts career.

=== Sotokomata ===
Sotokomata (外小股; "over thigh scooping body drop") is a kimarite in which, directly after a nage is avoided by the opponent, the attacker grabs the opponent's thigh from the outside, lifting it, and throwing them down on their back.

=== Susoharai ===
Susoharai (裾払い; "rear foot sweep") is a kimarite in which, directly after a nage is avoided by the opponent, an attacker drives the knee under the opponent's thigh and pulls them down to the surface.

=== Susotori ===
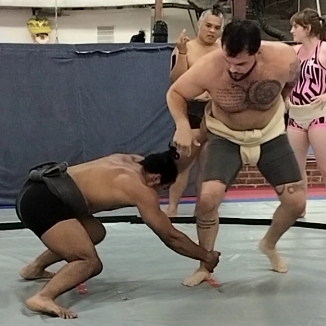
Amateur sumo wrestlers demonstrating susotori

Susotori (裾取り; "toe pick") is a kimarite in which, directly after a nage is avoided by the opponent, an attacker grabs the ankle of the opponent and pulls them down to the surface.

=== Tsumatori ===
Tsumatori (褄取り; "rear ankle pick") is a kimarite in which, as the opponent is losing their balance to the front (or is moving forward), the attacker grabs the leg and pulls it back, thereby ensuring the opponent falls to the surface.

=== Uchigake ===
Uchigake (内掛け; "inside leg trip") is performed by wrapping the calf around the opponent's calf from the inside and forcing him down on his back.

=== Watashikomi ===
Watashikomi (渡し込み; "thigh grabbing push down") is performed by grabbing the underside of the opponent's thigh or knee with one hand and pushing with the other arm, thereby forcing the opponent out or down.

== Throwing ==
Throwing techniques (Japanese: 投げ手, romanized: nagete) are kimarite where the rikishi wins the match by throwing their opponent to the dohyō or out of the ring.

=== Ipponzeoi ===
Ipponzeoi (一本背負い; "one-armed shoulder throw") is a kimarite in which, while moving backwards to the side, the opponent is pulled past the attacker and out of the ring by grabbing and pulling his arm with both hands.

=== Kakenage ===
Kakenage (掛け投げ; "hooking inner thigh throw") is performed by lifting the opponent's thigh with one's leg, while grasping the opponent with both arms, and then throwing the off-balance opponent to the ground.

=== Koshinage ===
Koshinage (腰投げ; "hip throw") is performed by bending over and pulling the opponent over the attacker's hip, then throwing the opponent to the ground on his back.

=== Kotenage ===
Kotenage (小手投げ; "armlock throw") is a kimarite in which the attacker wraps their arm around the opponent's extended arm, then throws the opponent to the ground without touching their mawashi. A common technique.

=== Kubinage ===
Kubinage (首投げ; "headlock throw") is performed by the attacker wrapping the opponent's head (or neck) in his arms, throwing him down.

=== Nichōnage ===
Nichōnage (二丁投げ; "body drop throw") is performed by extending the right (left) leg around the outside of the opponent's right (left) knee thereby sweeping both of his legs off the surface and throwing him down.

=== Shitatedashinage ===
Shitatedashinage (下手出し投げ; "pulling underarm throw") is performed when the attacker extends their arm under the opponent's arm to grab the opponent's mawashi while dragging the opponent forwards and/or to the side, throwing them to the ground.

=== Shitatenage ===
Shitatenage (下手投げ; "underarm throw") is a kimarite in which the attacker extends their arm under the opponent's arm to grab the opponent's mawashi and turns sideways, pulling the opponent down and throwing them to the ground.

=== Sukuinage ===
Sukuinage (掬い投げ; "beltless arm throw") is performed by the attacker extending their arm under the opponent's armpit and across their back while turning sideways, forcing the opponent forward and throwing him to the ground without touching the mawashi (beltless arm throw).

=== Tsukaminage ===
Tsukaminage (つかみ投げ; "lifting throw") is a technique where the attacker grabs the opponent's mawashi and lifts his body off the surface, pulling them into the air past the attacker and throwing them down.

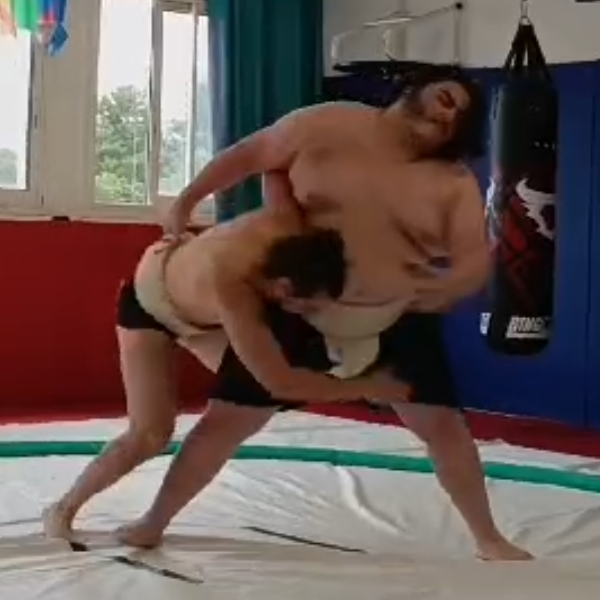
Amateur sumo wrestlers demonstrate uwatenage.

=== Uwatedashinage ===
Uwatedashinage (上手出し投げ; "pulling overarm throw") is executed when the attacker extends his arm over the opponent's arm/back to grab the opponent's mawashi while pulling him forwards to the ground.

=== Uwatenage ===
Uwatenage (上手投げ; "overarm throw") is performed by the attacker extending their arm over the opponent's arm to grab the opponent's mawashi and throwing the opponent to the ground while turning sideways.

=== Yaguranage ===
Yaguranage (櫓投げ; "inner thigh throw") is a technique performed by, with both wrestlers grasping each other's mawashi, pushing one's leg up under the opponent's groin, lifting them off the surface and then throwing them down on their side (inner thigh throw).

== Twist down ==
Twist down techniques (Japanese: 捻り手, romanized: hinerite) are kimarite where the rikishi wins the match by throwing an opponent or causing them to fall through a twisting motion.

=== Amiuchi ===
Amiuchi (網打ち; "the fisherman's throw") is a throw performed with both arms pulling on the opponent's arm, causing the opponent to fall over forward. The technique is quite rare, with fewer than 100 recorded uses in top division bouts. It is so named because it resembles the traditional Japanese technique for casting fishing nets. Yokozuna Chiyonofuji used the technique once (in January 1987) and commented afterwards that it was fitting since he was a fisherman's son.

=== Gasshōhineri ===
Gasshōhineri (合掌捻り; "clasped hand twist down") is performed with both hands clasped around the opponent's back, twisting the opponent over sideways. See Tokkurinage.

=== Harimanage ===
Harimanage (波離間投げ; "backward belt throw") is achieved when, reaching over the opponent's back and grabbing hold of their mawashi, the opponent is pulled over in front or beside the attacker.

=== Kainahineri ===
Kainahineri (腕捻り; "two-handed arm twist down") is performed by wrapping both arms around the opponent's extended arm and forcing him down to the dohyō by way of one's shoulder. (Similar to the tottari, but the body is positioned differently)

=== Katasukashi ===
Katasukashi (肩透かし; "under-shoulder swing down") is a technique where the attacker wraps his hands around the opponent's arm, both grasping the opponent's shoulder and forcing him down. This is notably used by Midorifuji.

=== Kotehineri ===
Kotehineri (小手捻り; "arm locking twist down") is performed when twisting the opponent's arm down, causing a fall.

=== Kubihineri ===
Kubihineri (首捻り; "head twisting throw") is performed by twisting the opponent's head or neck down, causing a fall.

=== Makiotoshi ===
Makiotoshi (巻き落とし; "twist down") is achieved when, reacting quickly to an opponent's actions, twisting the opponent's off-balance body down to the dohyō without grasping the mawashi.

=== Ōsakate ===
Ōsakate (大逆手; "backward twisting overarm throw") is a kimarite in which the attacker takes the opponent's arm extended over one's arm and twists the arm downward, while grabbing the opponent's body and throwing it in the same direction as the arm.

=== Sabaori ===
Sabaori (鯖折り; "forward force down") is performed by grabbing the opponent's mawashi while pulling out and down, forcing the opponent's knees to the dohyō.

=== Sakatottari ===
Sakatottari (逆とったり; "arm bar throw counter") is to wrap one arm around the opponent's extended arm while grasping onto the opponent's wrist with the other hand, twisting and forcing the opponent down (could be considered an "anti-tottari").

=== Shitatehineri ===
Shitatehineri (下手捻り; "twisting underarm throw") is a kimarite where a rikishi extends an arm under the opponent's arm to grasp the mawashi, then pulling the mawashi down until the opponent falls or touches his knee to the dohyō.

=== Sotomusō ===
Sotomusō (外無双; "outer thigh propping twist down") is a technique using the left (right) hand to grab onto the outside of the opponent's right (left) knee and twisting the opponent over one's left (right) knee.

=== Tokkurinage ===
Tokkurinage (徳利投げ; "two handed head twist down") is executed by grasping the opponent's neck or head with both hands and twisting him down to the dohyō.

=== Tottari ===
Tottari (とったり; "arm bar throw") is performed by wrapping both arms around the opponent's extended arm and forcing him forward down to the dohyō.

=== Tsukiotoshi ===
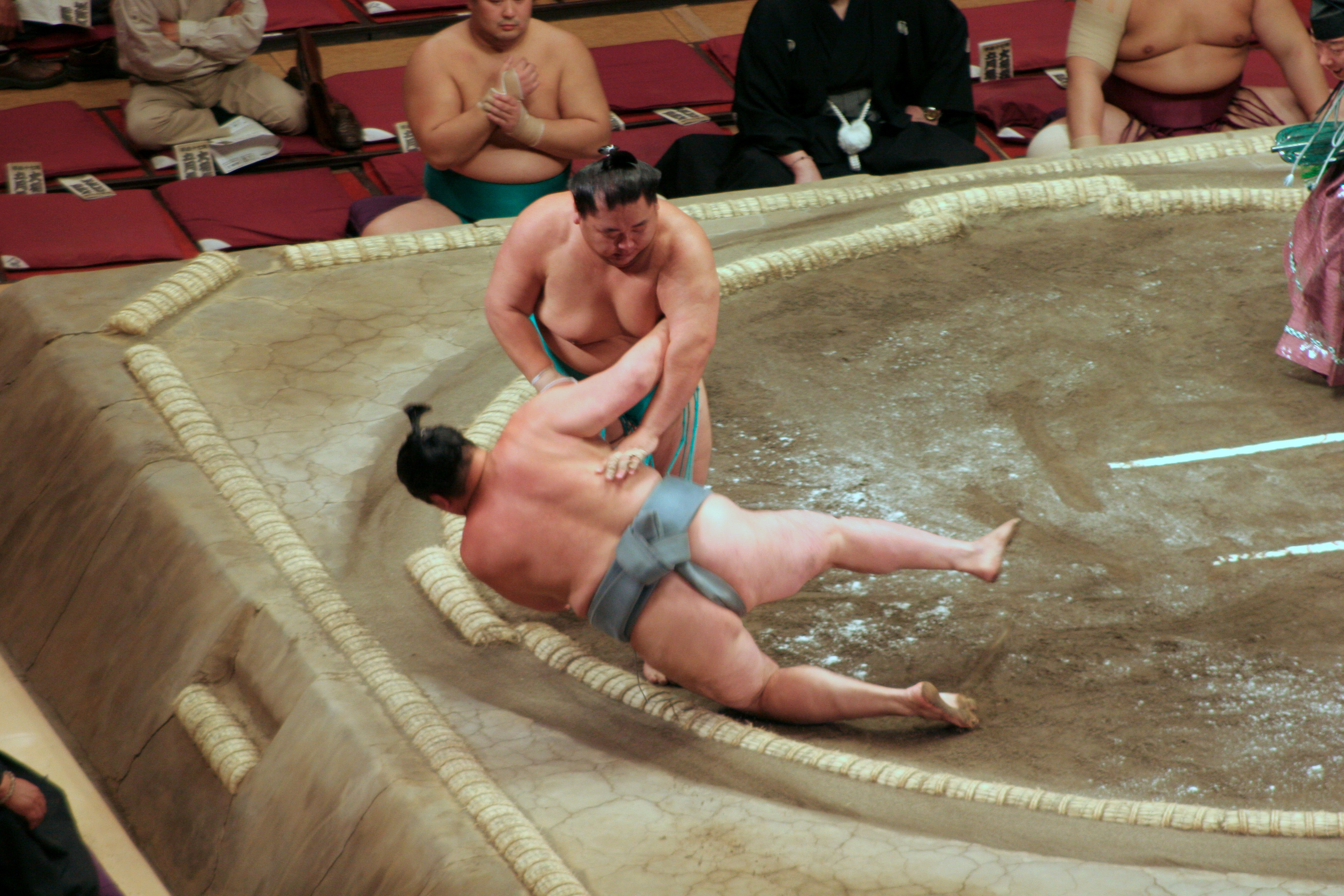
Tsukiotoshi

Tsukiotoshi (突き落とし; "thrust down") is achieved through twisting the opponent down to the dohyō by forcing the arms on the opponent's upper torso off of his center of gravity.

=== Uchimusō ===
Uchimusō (内無双; "inner thigh propping twist down") is a technique using the left (right) hand to grab onto the outside of the opponent's left (right) knee and twisting the opponent down. Aonishiki Arata is known for using this uncommon move, being responsible for 4 of the 5 top-division bouts where it was the winning technique in 2025.

=== Uwatehineri ===
Uwatehineri (上手捻り; "twisting overarm throw") is performed by extending the arm over the opponent's arm to grasp the mawashi, then pulling the mawashi down until the opponent falls or touches his knee to the dohyō.

=== Zubuneri ===
Zubuneri (ずぶねり; "head pivot throw") is called when the head is used to thrust an opponent down during a hineri.

== Backwards body drop ==
Backwards body drop techniques (Japanese: 反り手, romanized: sorite) are kimarite where the rikishi wins the match by throwing an opponent or forcing them backwards.

=== Izori ===
Izori (居反り; "backwards body drop") is a technique where, diving under the charge of the opponent, the attacker grabs behind one or both of the opponent's knees, or their mawashi and pulls them up and over backwards.

=== Kakezori ===
Kakezori (掛け反り; "hooking backwards body drop") is performed by putting one's head under the opponent's extended arm and body, and forcing the opponent backwards over one's legs.

=== Shumokuzori ===
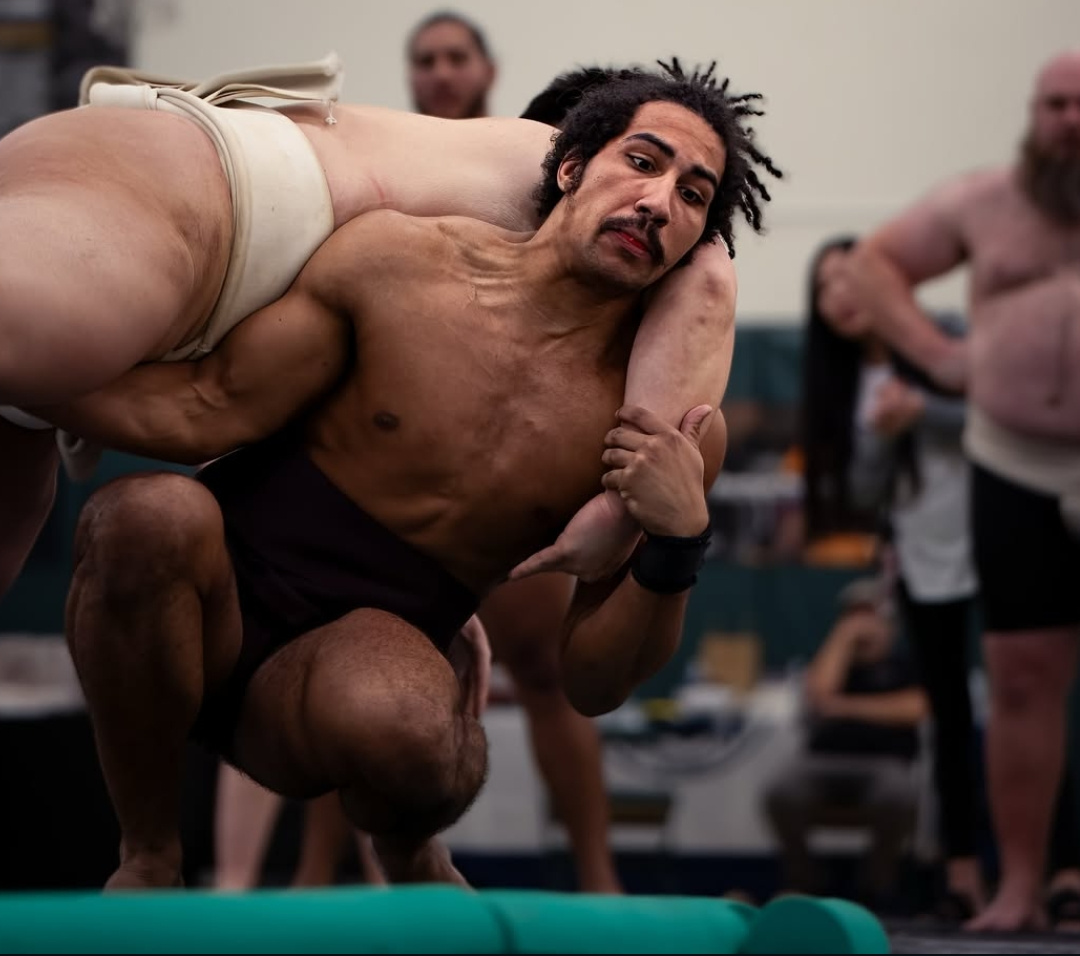
Amateur sumo wrestlers demonstrating sototasukizori; the attacker is in the black mawashi

Shumokuzori (撞木反り; "bell hammer backwards body drop") is a technique carried out in the same position as a tasukizori, but the wrestler throws himself backwards, thus ensuring that his opponent lands first under him. The name is derived from the similarity to the shape of Japanese bell hammers.

=== Sototasukizori ===
Ura (pink) performing tasukizori against Amakaze in Jan 2017; the first in 65 years

Sototasukizori (外たすき反り; "outer reverse backwards body drop") is a technique which, with one arm around the opponent's arm and one arm around the opponent's leg, one lifts their opponent and throws him sideways and backwards.

=== Tasukizori ===
Tasukizori (たすき反り; "reverse backwards body drop") is performed with one arm around the opponents arm and one arm around the opponent's leg, lifting the opponent perpendicular across the shoulders and throwing him down. The name refers to tasuki, the cords used to tie the sleeves of the traditional Japanese kimono.

=== Tsutaezori ===
Tsutaezori (伝え反り; "underarm forward body drop") is executed by shifting the extended opponent's arm around and twisting the opponent behind one's back and down to the dohyō. An uncommon move, it is associated primarily with Ura Kazuki, who is responsible for 4 of the 6 recorded top-division bouts where it was the winning technique.

== Special techniques ==
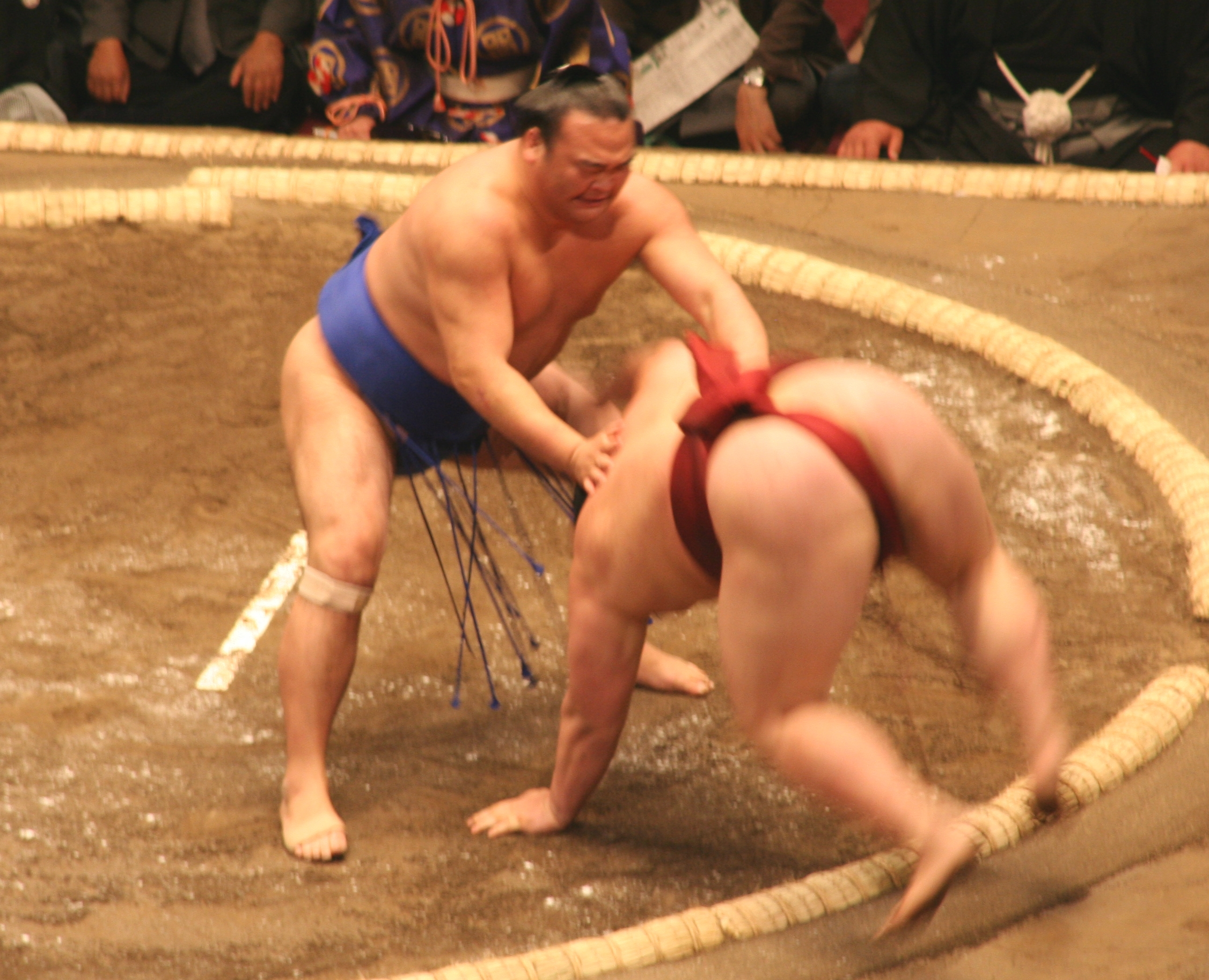
Takamisakari (left) defeats Kasugaō by hatakikomi.

Special techniques (Japanese: 特殊技, romanized: tokushūwaza) are kimarite where the rikishi wins the match by techniques outside the above categories.

=== Hatakikomi ===
Hatakikomi (叩き込み; "slap down") is slapping down the opponent's shoulder, back, or arm and forcing them to fall forwards touching the clay. For many, this technique is used as a last resort when driven back by an opponent, but some wrestlers make frequent use of the technique as their primary attack. Bulgarian sekiwake Aoiyama won with hatakikomi more than any other move. He recorded 164 victories with it in his career, about 27% of all his wins.

=== Hikiotoshi ===
Hikiotoshi (引き落とし; "hand pull down") is pulling on the opponent's shoulder, arm, or mawashi and forcing them to fall forwards touching the clay.

=== Hikkake ===
Hikkake (引っ掛け; "arm grabbing force out") is a technique in which, while moving backwards to the side, the opponent is pulled past the attacker and out of the dohyō by grabbing and pulling their arm with both hands.

=== Kimedashi ===
Kimedashi (極め出し; "arm barring force out") is performed by immobilizing the opponent's arms and shoulders with one's arms and forcing him out of the dohyō. 73rd yokozuna Terunofuji Haruo favored this technique, recording 33 wins with it during his professional career. It was his fourth most common winning technique.

=== Kimetaoshi ===
Kimetaoshi (極め倒し; "arm barring force down") is a technique executed by immobilizing the opponent's arms and shoulders with one's arms and forcing him down.

=== Okuridashi ===
Okuridashi (送り出し; "rear push out") is a kimarite in which one pushes an off-balance opponent out of the dohyō from behind.

=== Okurigake ===
Okurigake (送り掛け; "rear leg trip") is to trip an opponent's ankle up from behind.

=== Okurihikiotoshi ===
Okurihikiotoshi (送り引き落とし; "rear pull down") is a technique where a rikishi pulls an opponent down from behind.

=== Okurinage ===
Okurinage (送り投げ; "rear throw down") is to throw an opponent from behind.

=== Okuritaoshi ===
Okuritaoshi (送り倒し; "rear push down") is achieved by knocking down an opponent from behind.

=== Okuritsuridashi ===
Okuritsuridashi (送り吊り出し; "rear lift out") occurs when one picks up the opponent by his mawashi from behind and throws him out of the dohyō.

=== Okuritsuriotoshi ===
Okuritsuriotoshi (送り吊り落とし; "rear lifting body slam") is performed when a rikishi picks up an opponent by his mawashi from behind and throw him down on the dohyō. This incredibly rare technique has only been used successfully four times in top division bouts. The most recent instance was on Day 7 of the March 2022 tournament when Wakatakakage defeated Daieishō with the technique.

=== Sokubiotoshi ===
Sokubiotoshi (素首落とし; "head chop down") is achieved by pushing the opponent's head down from the back of the neck.

=== Tsuridashi ===
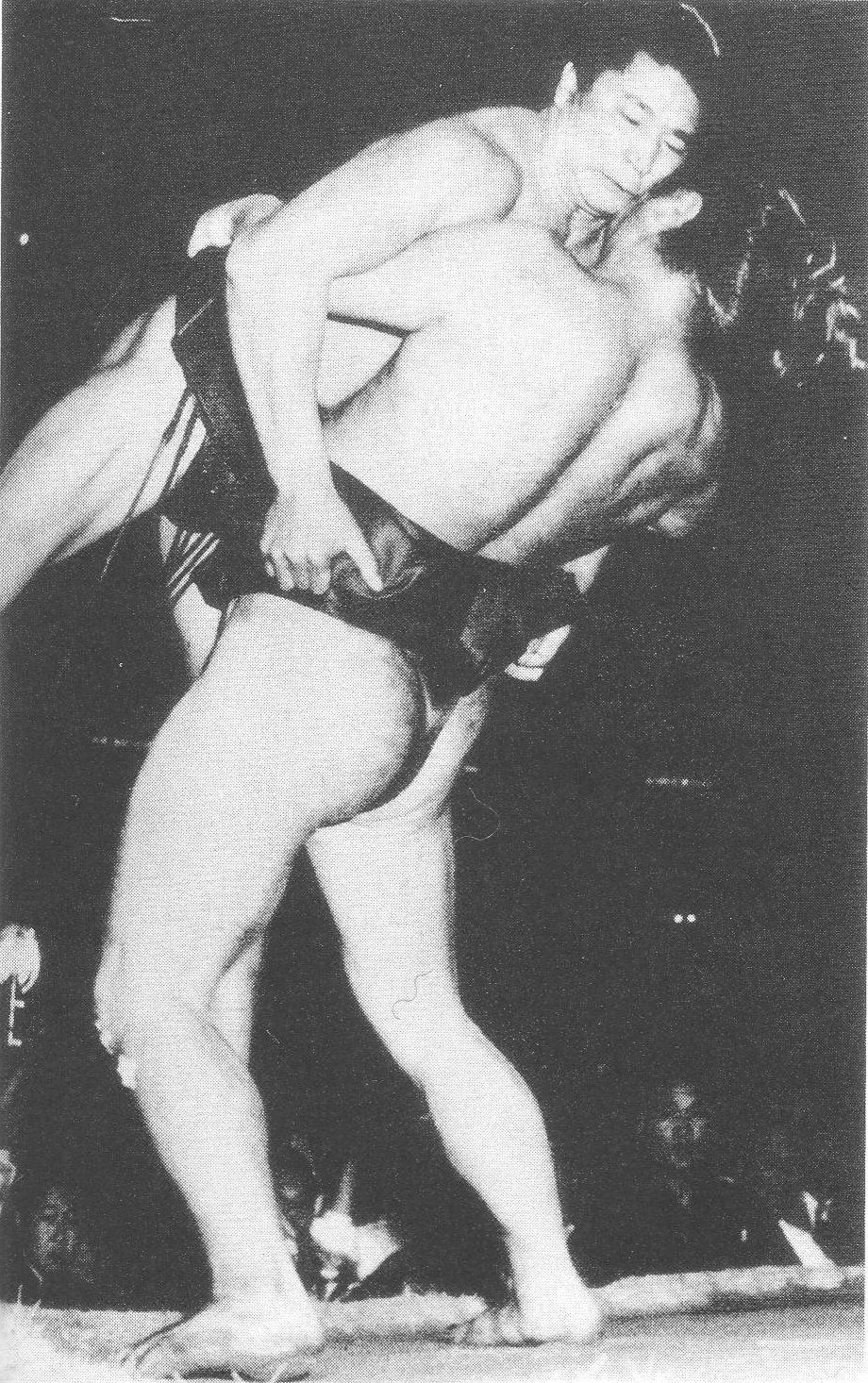
Tochinishiki (right) defeats Wakanohana by tsuridashi.

Tsuridashi (吊り出し; "frontal lift out") is a technique in which, while wrestlers face each other, one picks up their opponent by his mawashi and delivers him outside of the dohyō. Tochinoshin was famous for using this technique, earning the nickname "sky-crane".

=== Tsuriotoshi ===
Tsuriotoshi (吊り落とし; "frontal lifting body slam") is, while wrestlers face each other, to pick up the opponent by his mawashi and slam him onto the dohyō.

=== Ushiromotare ===
Ushiromotare (後ろもたれ; "backward lean out") is called when, while the opponent is behind the rikishi, to back up and push him out of the dohyō.

=== Utchari ===
Utchari (うっちゃり; "backward pivot throw") is a technique where, when near the edge of the dohyō, a rikishi bends himself backwards and twists the opponent's body until he steps out of the dohyō.

=== Waridashi ===
Waridashi (割り出し; "upper-arm force out") is to push one foot of the opponent out of the ring from the side, extending the arm across the opponent's body and using the leg to force him off balance.

=== Yobimodoshi ===
Yobimodoshi (呼び戻し; "pulling body slam") is achieved when, reacting to the opponent's reaction to an attacker's inside pull, the attacker pulls them off by grabbing around them around the waist, before throwing them down.

== Non-techniques ==
Non-techniques (Japanese: 非技, romanized: higi) are the five ways in which a wrestler can win without employing a technique.

=== Fumidashi ===
Fumidashi (踏み出し; "rear step out") occurs when an opponent accidentally takes a backward step outside the ring with no attack initiated against him.

=== Isamiashi ===
Isamiashi (勇み足; "forward step out") occurs when, in the performance of a kimarite, the opponent inadvertently steps too far forward and places a foot outside the ring.

=== Koshikudake ===
Koshikudake (腰砕け; "inadvertent collapse") is called when the opponent falls over backwards without a technique being initiated against him. This usually happens because he has over-committed to an attack.

=== Tsukihiza ===
Tsukihiza (つきひざ; "knee touch down") is called when the opponent stumbles and lands on one or both knees without any significant prior contact with the winning wrestler.

=== Tsukite ===
Tsukite (つき手; "hand touch down") occurs when the opponent stumbles and lands on one or both hands without any significant prior contact with the winning wrestler.

=== Fusen ===
Fusen (不戦) is called when the opponent is absent for the scheduled bout (by default). There are also corresponding terms for winning by default (不戦勝, fusenshō) and losing by default (不戦敗, fusenpai). Wins and losses by fusen are also visually recorded as black and white squares rather than the normal black and white circles.

=== Hansoku ===
Hansoku (反則; "foul" or "infraction") is called when the opponent is disqualified. This can be as a result of a wrestler committing a foul (禁じ手, kinjite; "forbidden technique") or other violation, such as having his mawashi come undone.

=== Archaic kimarite and draws ===
The Japan Sumo Association did not attempt to start standardizing kimarite decisions until 1935 and has modified its official list several times since. As a result, databases containing sumo results from earlier periods may list kimarite that are no longer recognized.

Additionally, the Japan Sumo Association has, over time, phased out the use of various draw states in favor of rematches (取り直し, torinaoshi) and forfeitures. Similar to fusen, the various draw states were recorded visually in a different manner than normal victories and losses, employing white triangles for both wrestlers instead.

== See also ==
- Glossary of sumo terms
