= Kazekenō Genta =

Japanese sumo wrestler

Personal information
- Native name: 風賢央 厳太
- Born: Sumiki Genta; June 4, 1999 (age 27) Asakita Ward, Hiroshima, Japan
- Height: 1.87 m (6 ft 1 1/2 in)
- Weight: 158 kg (348 lb; 24.9 st)

Sport
- Sport: Sumo
- Rank: see below
- University team: Chuo University
- Heya: Oshiogawa
- Debut: March 2022
- Highest rank: Jūryō 2 (September 2026)
- Championships: 1 Makushita; 1 Jonokuchi
- Updated on October 26, 2026

Kazekenō Genta (Japanese: 風賢央 厳太), born June 4, 1999 as Sumiki Genta (Japanese: 住木 厳太) is a professional sumo wrestler from Seiyo, Ehime Prefecture, Japan. He wrestles for Oshiogawa stable. He has won a makushita division championship and a jonokuchi division championship. Kazekenō's highest rank is juryo 2.

== Early life and sumo background ==
Kazekenō was born in Asakita Ward, Hiroshima. His family moved to Ehime prefecture when he was a child. He began sumo wrestling at the age of 10.

Kazekenō attended Nomura High School in Seiyo, where he participated in sumo. He finished as a runner up in the junior division of the National Sports Festival in his third year of high school.

Kazekenō attended Chuo University. During university, he placed top 16 in the All-Japan Championship, third in the East Japan Student Individual Weight Class Championship, and top eight in the All-Japan Student Individual Weight Class Championship. He also served as captain of the university's sumo club.

Upon graduating university, Kazekenō joined Oshiogawa stable. His stablemaster, Oshiogawa (former sekiwake Takekaze), is also a graduate of Chuo University.

== Career ==
Kazekenō debuted in the March 2022 tournament in maezumo. In the May 2022 tournament, he won the jonokuchi division with a 6-1 record. He continued to record 6-1 winning records, moving up to jonidan for the July 2022 tournament, and then to sandanme for the September 2022 tournament. Kazekenō was promoted to makushita for the January 2023 tournament, where he again scored 6-1. He maintained winning records until the July 2023 tournament, where his record dropped to 3-4. He also had losing records for the September 2023 and November 2023 tournaments. In the January 2024 tournament, he returned to a winning record of 5-2, and in the March 2024 tournament, his 7-0 winning record made him the makushita division champion. Kazekenō was then promoted to juryo. However, he struggled in the May 2024 tournament, and his 7-8 losing record resulted in his demotion back to makushita. He remained in makushita until he was promoted back to juryo for the March 2025 tournament. Kazekenō has remained in juryo since, achieving his highest rank of juryo 4 in advance of the September 2026 tournament.

== Career record ==
Kazekenō Genta
Year	January Hatsu basho, Tokyo	March Haru basho, Osaka	May Natsu basho, Tokyo	July Nagoya basho, Nagoya	September Aki basho, Tokyo	November Kyūshū basho, Fukuoka
2022	x	(Maezumō)	East Jonokuchi #22; 6–1; Champion	East Jonidan #49; 6–1	East Sandanme #74; 6–1	West Sandanme #18; 6–1
2023	West Makushita #40; 6–1	West Makushita #16; 4–3	West Makushita #13; 5–2	East Makushita #6; 3–4	West Makushita #10; 3–4	West Makushita #14; 2–5
2024	East Makushita #26; 5–2	West Makushita #13; 7–0; Champion	West Jūryō #14; 7–8	East Makushita #1; 2–4–1	East Makushita #14; 5–2	East Makushita #6; 5–2
2025	West Makushita #1; 4–3	West Jūryō #13; 8–7	East Jūryō #11; 9–6	East Jūryō #8; 5–10	East Jūryō #11; 8–7	West Jūryō #8; 6–9
2026	East Jūryō #10; 5–10	East Jūryō #14; 9–6	East Jūryō #11; 10–5	West Jūryō #6; 8–7	East Jūryō #4; 8–7	East Jūryō #2; 10–5
Record given as wins–losses–absences Top division champion Top division runner-up Retired Non-participation Jūryō Lower divisions Sanshō key: F=Fighting spirit; O=Outstanding performance; T=Technique Also shown: ★=Kinboshi; P=Playoff(s); Divisions: Makuuchi — Jūryō — Makushita — Sandanme — Jonidan — Jonokuchi Makuuchi ranks: Yokozuna — Ōzeki — Sekiwake — Komusubi — Maegashira

== See also ==
- Glossary of sumo terms
- List of active sumo wrestlers
