= Khindakh =

Khindakh Хиндах Хьиндахъ
- Selo
- Location within Republic of Dagestan Location within Russia
- Coordinates: 42°23′N 46°58′E
- Country: Russia
- Region: Republic of Dagestan
- District: Gunibsky District
- Time zone: UTC+3:00

Khindakh (Russian: Хиндах; Avar: Хьиндахъ) is a rural locality (a selo) in Gunibsky District, Republic of Dagestan, Russia. The population was 1,170 as of 2010.

== Geography ==
Khindakh is located 5 km north of Gunib (the district's administrative centre) by road. Khotoch and Gunib are the nearest rural localities.

== Nationalities ==
Avars live there.
