= Shamilsky District =

Shamilsky District Шамильский район (Russian)
- District

Other transcription(s)
  - Avar: Шамилил мухъ
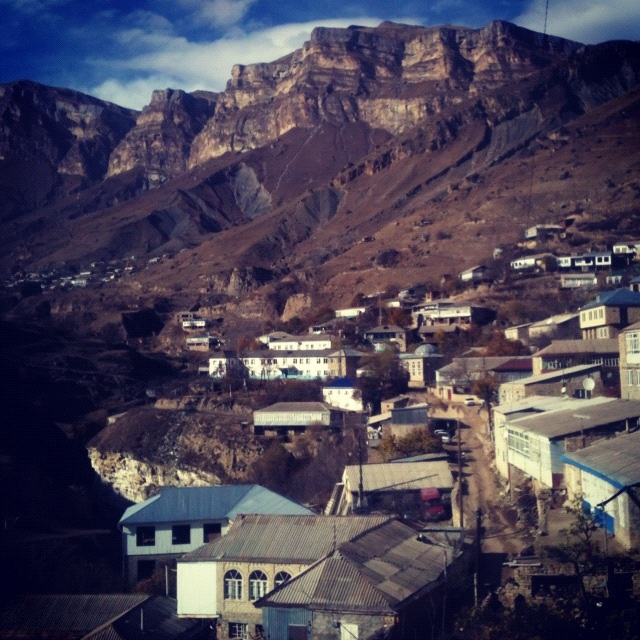
- The selo of Nizhny Batlukh in Shamilsky District

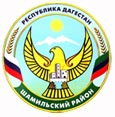
- Coat of arms
- Location of Shamilsky District in the Republic of Dagestan
- Coordinates: 42°27′N 46°33′E
- Country: Russia
- Federal subject: Republic of Dagestan
- Established: 1929
- Administrative center: Khebda

Area
  - Total: 920 km^{2} (360 sq mi)

Population (2010 Census)
  - Total: 28,122
  - Density: 31/km^{2} (79/sq mi)
  - Urban: 0%
  - Rural: 100%

Administrative structure
  - Administrative divisions: 10 Selsoviets
  - Inhabited localities: 52 rural localities

Municipal structure
  - Municipally incorporated as: Shamilsky Municipal District
  - Municipal divisions: 0 urban settlements, 25 rural settlements
- Time zone: UTC+3 (MSK)
- OKTMO ID: 82646000
- Website: http://xn--80aqaedff6b6c2b.xn--p1ai/

Population of Shamilsky District
- 2010 Census: 28,122
- 2002 Census: 26,053
- 1989 Census: 19,523
- 1979 Census: 23,459

Shamilsky District (Russian: Шамильский райо́н; Avar: Шамилил мухъ) is an administrative and municipal district (raion), one of the forty-one in the Republic of Dagestan, Russia. It is located in the western central part of the republic. The area of the district is 920 square kilometers (360 sq mi). Its administrative center is the rural locality (a selo) of Khebda. As of the 2010 Census, the total population of the district was 28,122, with the population of Khebda accounting for 9.1% of that number.

== History ==
Until 1994, the district was called Sovetsky (Сове́тский).

== Administrative and municipal status ==
Within the framework of administrative divisions, Shamilsky District is one of the forty-one in the Republic of Dagestan. The district is divided into ten selsoviets which comprise fifty-two rural localities. As a municipal division, the district is incorporated as Shamilsky Municipal District. Its ten selsoviets are incorporated as twenty-five rural settlements within the municipal district. The selo of Khebda serves as the administrative center of both the administrative and municipal district.
