= Khebda =

Coordinates: 42°26′37″N 46°32′51″E

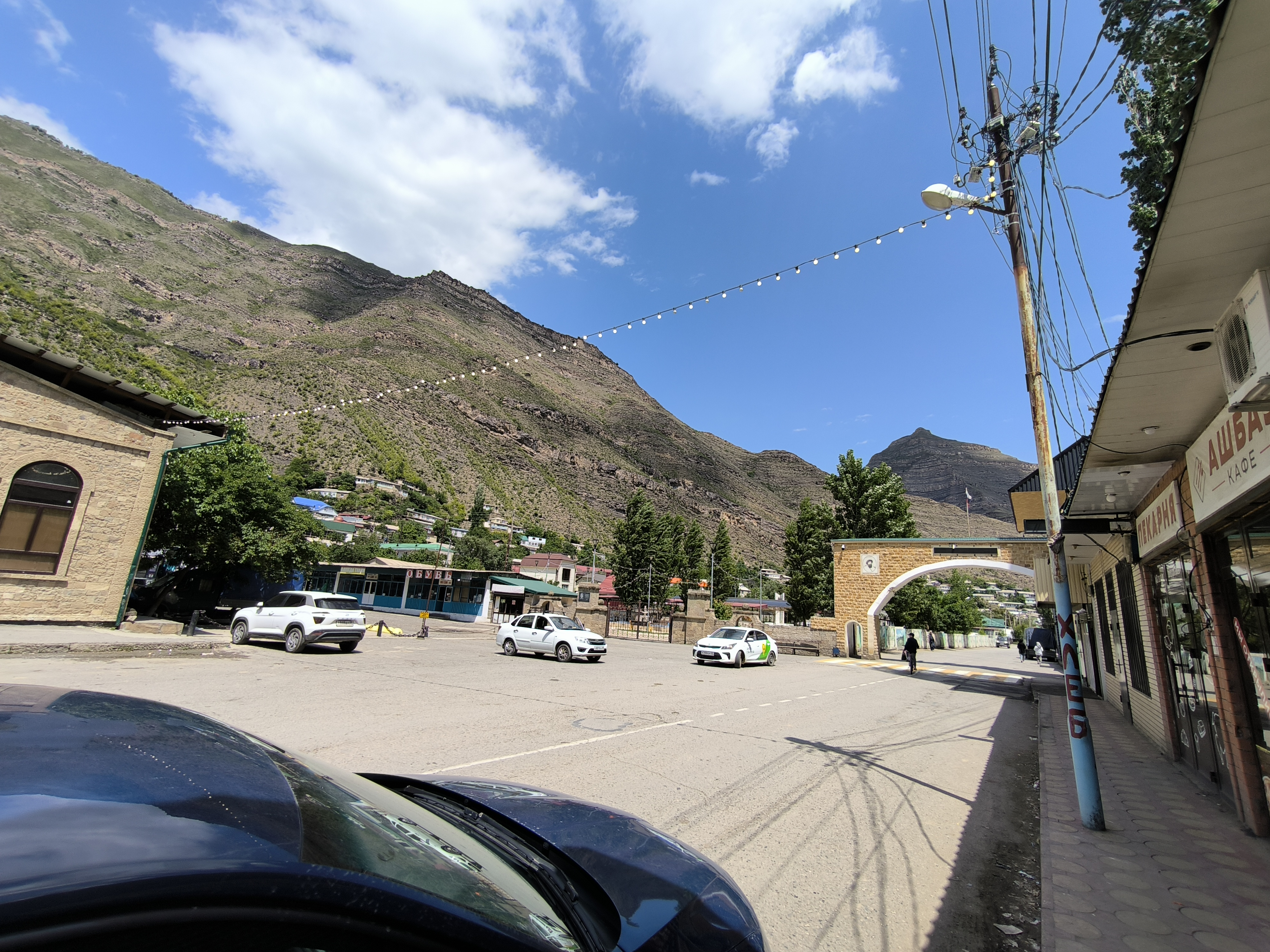

Khebda (Russian: Хебда; Avar: Хӏебда) is a rural locality (a selo) and the administrative center of Shamilsky District of the Republic of Dagestan, Russia. Population: 2,552 (2010 census); 2,568 (2002 census); 2,365 (1989 Soviet census).

Until 1994, it was known as Sovetskoye (Советское).
