= Kinoarashi Kazutoshi =

Japanese sumo wrestler (born 1961)

Personal information
- Native name: 騏ノ嵐 和敏
- Born: Kazutoshi Ishiyama; 9 July 1961 (age 65) Yūbari, Hokkaidō, Japan
- Height: 1.84 m (6 ft 1/2 in)
- Weight: 157 kg (346 lb)

Sport
- Sport: Sumo
- Retired: September, 1991
- Heya: Oshiogawa
- Record: 459-405-97
- Debut: March, 1977
- Highest rank: Maegashira 2 (November, 1982)
- Championships: 1 (Jūryō); 2 (Makushita)
- Gold Stars: 1 (Kitanoumi)

Kinoarashi Kazutoshi (born 9 July 1961 as Kazutoshi Ishiyama) is a former sumo wrestler from Yūbari, Hokkaidō, Japan. He joined professional sumo in 1977 and reached the top makuuchi division in 1982. His highest rank was maegashira 2. He fell to the sandanme division through injury before staging a successful comeback to the top division in 1987. He retired in 1991.

== Career ==
His father was a coal miner. He played baseball and table tennis at junior high school. He joined Oshiogawa stable, recruited by the former Daikirin. He made his professional debut in March 1977, alongside another future top division wrestler from the same stable, Enazakura. He reached the top division in March 1982. He was touted as a possible candidate for ozeki and was named "Rookie of the Year" by the Tokyo Chunichi Sports newspaper after earning a kinboshi for defeating yokozuna Kitanoumi in September 1982. However he suffered a serious injury to his left knee whilst training with Hōō at Nishonoseki stable in 1983 which led to him missing several tournaments and falling to the fourth sandanme division. He slowly rose again in the ranks and won the juryo division yusho or tournament championship in September 1986.

In March 1987 he was promoted back to the top division. At the time he held the record for lowest rank fallen before a successful return to makuuchi at Sandanme #25 (this record stood for 28 years before being surpassed by Tosayutaka in 2015). However, due to the severity of his injury he was unable to fulfill his early promise. He did not manage to earn another kinboshi or win a special prize and never managed to reach the sanyaku ranks, his highest rank of maegashira 2 being achieved back in November 1982. He left the sumo world upon retirement in September 1991, and opened a chanko restaurant in Koto, Tokyo.

== Fighting style ==
Kinoarashi favoured yotsu-sumo, or grappling techniques, and used a left hand outside, right hand inside (migi-yotsu) grip on his opponent's mawashi. His favourite kimarite or techniques were yori-kiri (force out), yori-taoshi (force out and down) uwate nage (overarm throw), and sukui nage (scoop throw).

== Career record ==
Kinoarashi Kazutoshi
Year	January Hatsu basho, Tokyo	March Haru basho, Osaka	May Natsu basho, Tokyo	July Nagoya basho, Nagoya	September Aki basho, Tokyo	November Kyūshū basho, Fukuoka
1977	x	(Maezumo)	East Jonokuchi #15; 5–2	West Jonidan #70; 4–3	East Jonidan #48; 3–4	West Jonidan #57; Sat out due to injury 0–0–7
1978	East Jonidan #102; 5–2	West Jonidan #58; 4–3	East Jonidan #25; 1–6	West Jonidan #64; 4–3	East Jonidan #45; 6–1	West Sandanme #74; 5–2
1979	East Sandanme #49; 4–3	West Sandanme #37; 5–2	East Sandanme #15; 4–3	West Sandanme #6; 4–3	West Makushita #54; 4–3	West Makushita #43; 4–3
1980	East Makushita #33; 2–5	West Makushita #54; 6–1	East Makushita #27; 3–4	West Makushita #35; 6–1	East Makushita #15; 4–3	West Makushita #9; 7–0; Champion
1981	East Jūryō #12; 6–9	West Makushita #3; 3–4	West Makushita #7; 5–2	East Makushita #2; 3–4	West Makushita #6; 7–0; Champion	West Jūryō #10; 9–6
1982	West Jūryō #2; 9–6	East Maegashira #12; 8–7	West Maegashira #8; 8–7	East Maegashira #4; 6–9	West Maegashira #7; 9–6 ★	East Maegashira #2; 7–8
1983	West Maegashira #3; Sat out due to injury 0–0–15	East Jūryō #2; 8–7	West Maegashira #13; Sat out due to injury 0–0–15	West Jūryō #9; 2–5–8	West Makushita #9; Sat out due to injury 0–0–7	East Makushita #45; Sat out due to injury 0–0–7
1984	East Sandanme #25; 7–0–P	East Makushita #28; 5–2	West Makushita #11; 6–1	East Makushita #2; 4–3	East Makushita #1; 4–3	West Jūryō #12; 6–9
1985	West Makushita #2; Sat out due to injury 0–0–7	West Makushita #42; 6–1	West Makushita #19; 5–2	West Makushita #10; 6–1	East Makushita #3; 5–2	West Makushita #1; 4–3
1986	West Jūryō #12; 9–6	East Jūryō #7; 8–7	East Jūryō #5; 6–9	West Jūryō #11; 8–7	East Jūryō #8; 12–3; Champion	East Jūryō #2; 8–7
1987	West Jūryō #1; 8–7	East Maegashira #14; 9–6	East Maegashira #8; 6–9	West Maegashira #12; 8–7	East Maegashira #9; 5–10	East Jūryō #2; 5–10
1988	West Jūryō #7; 7–8	West Jūryō #8; 8–7	West Jūryō #5; 8–7	West Jūryō #2; 9–6	East Maegashira #14; 5–10	West Jūryō #3; 6–9
1989	West Jūryō #7; 9–6	West Jūryō #3; 9–6	East Jūryō #1; 8–7	West Maegashira #14; 9–6	East Maegashira #9; 7–8	East Maegashira #10; 6–9
1990	West Maegashira #13; 5–10	East Jūryō #4; 5–10	East Jūryō #11; 9–6	West Jūryō #5; 6–9	East Jūryō #10; 8–7	West Jūryō #5; 5–10
1991	East Jūryō #13; 0–8–7	East Makushita #21; Sat out due to injury 0–0–7	East Sandanme #1; 0–4–3	East Sandanme #46; Sat out due to injury 0–0–7	West Jonidan #6; Retired; 0–0–7	x
Record given as wins–losses–absences Top division champion Top division runner-up Retired Lower divisions Non-participation Sanshō key: F=Fighting spirit; O=Outstanding performance; T=Technique Also shown: ★=Kinboshi; P=Playoff(s); Divisions: Makuuchi — Jūryō — Makushita — Sandanme — Jonidan — Jonokuchi Makuuchi ranks: Yokozuna — Ōzeki — Sekiwake — Komusubi — Maegashira

== See also ==
- Glossary of sumo terms
- List of past sumo wrestlers
- List of sumo tournament second division champions
