= Aobajō Yukio =

Japanese sumo wrestler

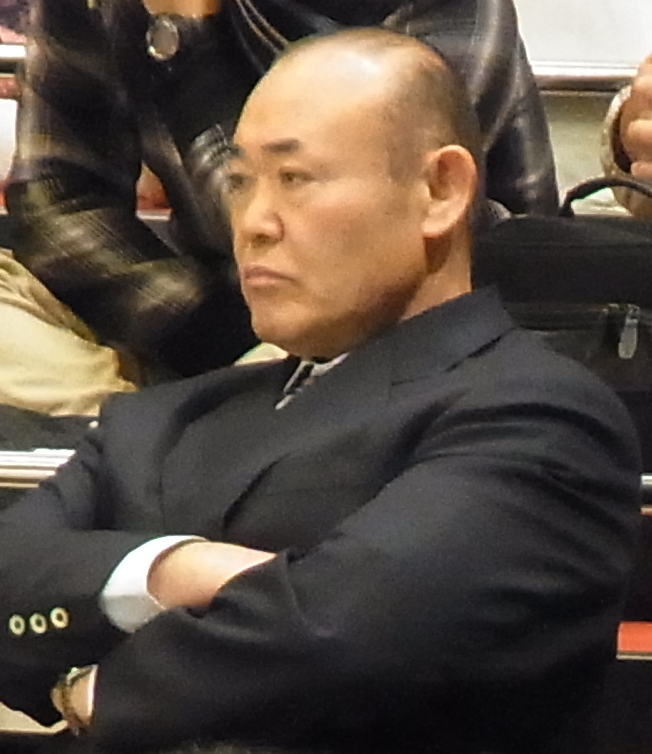
- Aobajō in December 2011

Personal information
- Native name: 青葉城 幸雄
- Born: Shōji Yukio; 14 November 1948 (age 77) Sendai, Miyagi Prefecture, Japan
- Height: 1.81 m (5 ft 11 1/2 in)
- Weight: 152 kg (335 lb; 23.9 st)

Sport
- Sport: Sumo
- Retired: July 1986
- Heya: Nishonoseki, Oshiogawa
- Record: 789-842-0
- Debut: March 1964
- Highest rank: Sekiwake (July 1983)
- Elder name: Shiranui
- Championships: 1 (Jūryō); 1 (Makushita)
- Special Prizes: Fighting Spirit (1)
- Gold Stars: 1 (Kitanoumi)
- Updated on June 2020

Aobajō Yukio (Japanese: 青葉城 幸雄; born 14 November 1948 as Yukio Shōji (庄司 幸雄)) is a Japanese former professional sumo wrestler from Sendai, Miyagi Prefecture. He did not miss a single bout in his 22-year professional career, and held the record for the most consecutive matches fought, at 1,630, until September 10, 2024, when Tamawashi Ichirō broke the record. After his retirement from active competition, he served as an elder of the Japan Sumo Association and worked as a coach.

== Career ==
He made his debut in March 1964, joining Nishonoseki stable. He reached the top makuuchi division for the first time in January 1975. In only his fourth top division tournament, he finished as a runner-up, won a sanshō (for Fighting Spirit), and earned a kinboshi for defeating a yokozuna. Although he never achieved any of those things again, he fought in the top division for a total of 62 tournaments. He made his san'yaku debut in September 1975 at komusubi and in October of that year he followed the former ōzeki Daikirin to the newly established Oshiogawa stable. He dropped into the jūryō division in 1981, but fought his way back, and an 8-7 score at maegashira 1 in May 1983 took him to his highest rank of sekiwake, which he held for just one tournament. This was his second and final appearance in the san'yaku ranks, coming 47 tournaments after his first—the longest such gap since the six tournaments per year schedule began in 1958. It also took him 116 tournaments from his professional debut to reach the rank of sekiwake, which is the slowest ever. In 1985, he surpassed Fujizakura's record of 1,543 consecutive career appearances. When he retired in July 1986—having not missed any matches since his debut—he had set a new record of 1,630 consecutive bouts. He was nearly 38 years old, having been an active wrestler for over 22 years.

== Retirement from sumo ==
After retirement from active competition, he became an elder in the Japan Sumo Association (at Deputy Director level) under the name Shiranui Oyakata. He later on coached at the Oshiogawa and Oguruma stables and reached the Sumo Association's mandatory retirement age of 65 in November 2013.

== Fighting style ==
Aobajo was a yotsu-sumo wrestler, preferring a hidari-yotsu, or right hand outside, left hand inside grip on his opponent's mawashi. His most common winning kimarite was yori-kiri (force out), though he also regularly used tsuri-dashi (the lift out) and sukuinage (the scoop throw).

== Career record ==
Aobajō Yukio
| Year | January Hatsu basho, Tokyo | March Haru basho, Osaka | May Natsu basho, Tokyo | July Nagoya basho, Nagoya | September Aki basho, Tokyo | November Kyūshū basho, Fukuoka |
|---|---|---|---|---|---|---|
| 1964 | x | (Maezumo) | East Jonokuchi #24; 3–4 | East Jonidan #131; 5–2 | West Jonidan #74; 3–4 | East Jonidan #84; 5–2 |
| 1965 | West Jonidan #33; 2–5 | East Jonidan #65; 4–3 | West Jonidan #35; 1–6 | East Jonidan #70; 2–5 | West Jonidan #87; 4–3 | West Jonidan #46; 3–4 |
| 1966 | East Jonidan #65; 5–2 | East Jonidan #25; 6–1 | West Sandanme #71; 5–2 | West Sandanme #29; 4–3 | East Sandanme #10; 4–3 | West Makushita #89; 3–4 |
| 1967 | West Makushita #98; 3–4 | West Sandanme #7; 4–3 | West Sandanme #39; 4–3 | West Sandanme #22; 3–4 | West Sandanme #30; 5–2 | West Sandanme #6; 4–3 |
| 1968 | West Makushita #55; 4–3 | East Makushita #44; 3–4 | East Makushita #52; 5–2 | East Makushita #39; 5–2 | West Makushita #26; 3–4 | East Makushita #31; 4–3 |
| 1969 | West Makushita #25; 3–4 | West Makushita #31; 4–3 | West Makushita #25; 4–3 | East Makushita #22; 5–2 | East Makushita #10; 4–3 | East Makushita #8; 4–3 |
| 1970 | East Makushita #7; 2–5 | West Makushita #15; 3–4 | West Makushita #20; 4–3 | East Makushita #15; 5–2 | East Makushita #7; 3–4 | East Makushita #12; 6–1–PPPPP; Champion |
| 1971 | East Makushita #4; 4–3 | West Makushita #2; 5–2 | West Jūryō #12; 8–7 | West Jūryō #9; 8–7 | East Jūryō #8; 7–8 | West Jūryō #9; 7–8 |
| 1972 | West Jūryō #10; 9–6 | East Jūryō #4; 8–7 | West Jūryō #2; 5–10 | East Jūryō #7; 6–9 | East Jūryō #9; 7–8 | East Jūryō #10; 9–6 |
| 1973 | West Jūryō #4; 3–12 | West Jūryō #13; 2–13 | East Makushita #10; 4–3 | East Makushita #9; 5–2 | West Makushita #5; 4–3 | East Makushita #3; 4–3 |
| 1974 | East Makushita #1; 5–2 | West Jūryō #12; 9–6 | East Jūryō #7; 8–7 | West Jūryō #5; 7–8 | West Jūryō #6; 8–7 | East Jūryō #3; 10–5–PP |
| 1975 | West Maegashira #11; 8–7 | East Maegashira #10; 8–7 | East Maegashira #7; 8–7 | East Maegashira #5; 12–3; F★ | East Komusubi #1; 6–9 | East Maegashira #3; 6–9 |
| 1976 | West Maegashira #5; 8–7 | West Maegashira #2; 6–9 | East Maegashira #5; 9–6 | West Maegashira #1; 8–7 | East Maegashira #1; 3–12 | East Maegashira #8; 8–7 |
| 1977 | East Maegashira #5; 6–9 | West Maegashira #8; 9–6 | West Maegashira #2; 7–8 | West Maegashira #3; 6–9 | East Maegashira #7; 7–8 | East Maegashira #8; 7–8 |
| 1978 | East Maegashira #9; 8–7 | West Maegashira #5; 8–7 | East Maegashira #3; 3–12 | West Maegashira #12; 9–6 | West Maegashira #6; 8–7 | East Maegashira #5; 6–9 |
| 1979 | West Maegashira #8; 9–6 | West Maegashira #2; 3–12 | West Maegashira #9; 8–7 | Maegashira #6; 6–9 | East Maegashira #11; 10–5 | West Maegashira #3; 5–10 |
| 1980 | West Maegashira #7; 6–9 | East Maegashira #12; 9–6 | West Maegashira #7; 4–11 | East Maegashira #13; 8–7 | East Maegashira #11; 4–11 | West Jūryō #4; 8–7 |
| 1981 | East Jūryō #2; 7–8 | West Jūryō #2; 6–9 | West Jūryō #6; 8–7 | West Jūryō #2; 10–5; Champion | West Maegashira #11; 8–7 | West Maegashira #7; 7–8 |
| 1982 | West Maegashira #8; 8–7 | West Maegashira #3; 7–8 | East Maegashira #5; 7–8 | West Maegashira #6; 8–7 | East Maegashira #3; 4–11 | East Maegashira #10; 9–6 |
| 1983 | West Maegashira #4; 6–9 | East Maegashira #8; 8–7 | West Maegashira #1; 8–7 | West Sekiwake #1; 4–11 | East Maegashira #5; 7–8 | East Maegashira #6; 8–7 |
| 1984 | East Maegashira #2; 6–9 | West Maegashira #3; 6–9 | West Maegashira #6; 7–8 | West Maegashira #9; 8–7 | East Maegashira #5; 4–11 | West Maegashira #11; 10–5 |
| 1985 | East Maegashira #3; 6–9 | West Maegashira #5; 6–9 | West Maegashira #9; 8–7 | East Maegashira #5; 5–10 | West Maegashira #11; 8–7 | West Maegashira #6; 6–9 |
| 1986 | East Maegashira #12; 4–11 | East Jūryō #4; 8–7 | East Jūryō #2; 4–11 | West Jūryō #10; Retired; 4–8 | x | x |
Record given as wins–losses–absences Top division champion Top division runner-up Retired Lower divisions Non-participation Sanshō key: F=Fighting spirit; O=Outstanding performance; T=Technique Also shown: ★=Kinboshi; P=Playoff(s); Divisions: Makuuchi — Jūryō — Makushita — Sandanme — Jonidan — Jonokuchi Makuuchi ranks: Yokozuna — Ōzeki — Sekiwake — Komusubi — Maegashira

== See also ==
- List of sumo record holders
- List of sumo tournament top division runners-up
- List of sumo tournament second division champions
- Glossary of sumo terms
- List of past sumo wrestlers
- List of sekiwake
