= Wakatoba Hiromi =

Japanese sumo wrestler (born 1977)

Personal information
- Native name: 若兎馬 裕三
- Born: Hiromi Yamada; June 15, 1977 (age 49) Tokyo, Japan
- Height: 1.75 m (5 ft 9 in)
- Weight: 130 kg (290 lb)

Sport
- Sport: Sumo
- Retired: September, 2007
- Heya: Oshiogawa → Oguruma
- Record: 416-406-28
- Debut: March, 1993
- Highest rank: Maegashira 11 (November, 2003)
- Elder name: See retirement
- Updated on June 25, 2020

Wakatoba Hiromi (born June 15, 1977, as Hiromi Yamada) is a former sumo wrestler from Fuchū, Tokyo, Japan. His highest rank was maegashira 11.

== Career ==
He made his professional debut in March 1993, joining Oshiogawa stable, run by former ōzeki Daikirin. He initially wrestled under his own surname of Yamada. After a long apprenticeship in the junior ranks he achieved senior sekitori status in May 2001 upon promotion to the jūryō division. To mark the occasion he changed his shikona to Wakatoba. After a 10–5 record at the rank of jūryō 4 in July 2003 he was promoted to the top makuuchi division. An 8–7 mark in his top division debut saw him promoted to his highest rank of maegashira 11. He fought in the top division for a total of seven tournaments. In March 2005 he was transferred to Oguruma stable when Oshiogawa stable shut down. He was demoted back to jūryō in March 2006 and after pulling out of the January 2007 tournament after only five days with an injury to his left leg he was relegated to the unsalaried ranks.

== Retirement ==
After the May 2007 tournament it was reported that Wakatoba had retired, and he was quoted as saying he had lost his will to continue, and that his most memorable match was one against Terao. However, he subsequently denied that he had retired, and he competed in the following tournament in July. However, after that tournament, having fallen to the rank of makushita 57, he did retire and became an elder of the Japan Sumo Association under his old stablemaster's name of Oshiogawa the following month. His danpatsu-shiki, or official retirement ceremony, was held in February 2008, and he introduced his fiancé at the event. He worked as a coach at Oguruma stable until leaving the Sumo Association in August 2010. This move coincided with the death of the previous Oshiogawa, and the Oshiogawa stock was obtained by Takekaze.

In June 2018 he was featured in Tokyo Broadcasting System Television's The Friday, working alongside fellow former sumo wrestlers Wakanojō and Wakatenrō, in care for the elderly.

== Career record ==
Wakatoba Hiromi
| Year | January Hatsu basho, Tokyo | March Haru basho, Osaka | May Natsu basho, Tokyo | July Nagoya basho, Nagoya | September Aki basho, Tokyo | November Kyūshū basho, Fukuoka |
|---|---|---|---|---|---|---|
| 1993 | x | (Maezumo) | East Jonokuchi #5; 5–2 | East Jonidan #140; 5–2 | West Jonidan #95; 3–4 | East Jonidan #118; 4–3 |
| 1994 | West Jonidan #93; 5–2 | West Jonidan #50; 5–2 | East Jonidan #11; 4–3 | East Sandanme #94; 4–3 | East Sandanme #76; 6–1 | East Sandanme #24; 2–4–1 |
| 1995 | West Sandanme #50; 2–5 | West Sandanme #78; 4–3 | East Sandanme #62; 2–4–1 | East Sandanme #84; 5–2 | West Sandanme #53; 4–3 | West Sandanme #33; 6–1 |
| 1996 | East Makushita #53; 3–4 | East Sandanme #11; 4–3 | East Makushita #60; 5–2 | East Makushita #38; 5–2 | East Makushita #21; 3–4 | West Makushita #29; 3–4 |
| 1997 | West Makushita #37; 2–5 | West Makushita #57; 3–4 | East Sandanme #12; 3–4 | West Sandanme #25; 5–2 | West Makushita #59; 2–3–2 | East Sandanme #21; Sat out due to injury 0–0–7 |
| 1998 | East Sandanme #21; Sat out due to injury 0–0–7 | East Sandanme #81; 5–2 | East Sandanme #51; 7–0–P | East Makushita #32; 3–4 | West Makushita #40; 5–2 | West Makushita #27; 2–5 |
| 1999 | East Makushita #44; 2–5 | East Makushita #29; 5–2 | West Makushita #17; 2–5 | East Makushita #31; 1–6 | West Makushita #50; 3–4 | East Sandanme #4; 4–3 |
| 2000 | West Makushita #54; 4–3 | West Makushita #44; 4–3 | East Makushita #37; 5–2 | East Makushita #21; 4–3 | East Makushita #16; 5–2 | West Makushita #7; 5–2 |
| 2001 | East Makushita #4; 4–3 | East Makushita #2; 4–3 | East Jūryō #12; 7–8 | West Jūryō #13; 9–6–P | West Jūryō #9; 6–9 | East Jūryō #12; 7–8 |
| 2002 | East Jūryō #13; 4–11 | West Makushita #5; 6–1 | East Jūryō #12; 2–13 | West Makushita #10; 4–3 | East Makushita #8; 6–1 | East Makushita #1; 4–3 |
| 2003 | West Jūryō #11; 8–7 | West Jūryō #8; 8–7 | West Jūryō #5; 8–7 | East Jūryō #4; 10–5 | East Maegashira #13; 8–7 | East Maegashira #11; 7–8 |
| 2004 | West Maegashira #12; 4–11 | East Jūryō #4; 8–7 | West Jūryō #3; 9–6 | Maegashira #15; 3–12 | East Jūryō #5; 5–10 | East Jūryō #10; 11–4 |
| 2005 | West Jūryō #3; 7–8 | West Jūryō #4; 8–7 | East Jūryō #1; 6–9 | East Jūryō #5; 10–5 | West Maegashira #15; 8–7 | East Maegashira #12; 5–10 |
| 2006 | West Maegashira #15; 4–11 | East Jūryō #6; 6–9 | East Jūryō #10; 9–6 | East Jūryō #7; 5–10 | West Jūryō #11; 9–6 | East Jūryō #8; 7–8 |
| 2007 | East Jūryō #10; 1–4–10 | West Makushita #8; 2–5 | West Makushita #22; 1–6 | East Makushita #46; 3–4 | East Makushita #57; Retired – | x |
Record given as wins–losses–absences Top division champion Top division runner-up Retired Lower divisions Non-participation Sanshō key: F=Fighting spirit; O=Outstanding performance; T=Technique Also shown: ★=Kinboshi; P=Playoff(s); Divisions: Makuuchi — Jūryō — Makushita — Sandanme — Jonidan — Jonokuchi Makuuchi ranks: Yokozuna — Ōzeki — Sekiwake — Komusubi — Maegashira

== See also ==
- Glossary of sumo terms
- List of past sumo wrestlers
