= Wakakirin Shinichi =

Japanese sumo and professional wrestler

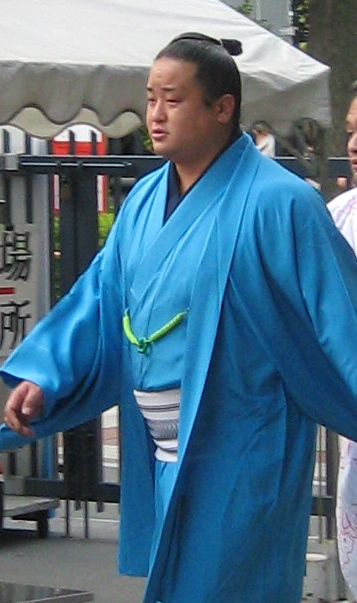

Personal information
- Native name: 若麒麟 真一
- Born: Shinichi Suzukawa; September 21, 1983 (age 43) Kawanishi, Hyōgo, Japan
- Height: 1.86 m (6 ft 1 in)
- Weight: 125 kg (276 lb)

Sport
- Sport: Sumo
- Retired: February 2009
- Heya: Oshiogawa → Oguruma
- Record: 279-232-22
- Debut: March 1999
- Highest rank: Maegashira 9 (January, 2008)
- Championships: 2 (Makushita)
- Updated on Jan 2009

Wakakirin Shinichi (若麒麟 真一, Wakakirin Shin'ichi), born September 21, 1983, as Shinichi Suzukawa (鈴川真一, Suzukawa Shin'ichi), is a former sumo wrestler from Hyōgo prefecture in Japan. His highest rank was maegashira 9. He was thrown out of the sport in February 2009 after being arrested for cannabis possession. In 2010 he became a professional wrestler.

== Sumo career ==
Born in Kawanishi, his father ran a restaurant. He has a younger brother. He did baseball at elementary school. He was asked to join Oshiogawa stable while visiting the heya with a classmate of his father, and was contacted a number of times after that. He made his professional debut in March 1999. He is the fourth wrestler from that class to make the top division, following Kotomitsuki, Takamisakari and Hamanishiki, but the first to do so after making his debut at the lowest level of sumo entry, mae-zumo. He began competing under his own surname, but upon reaching the second highest jūryō division for the first time in July 2004 his stablemaster Oshiogawa Oyakata honoured him with the name of Wakakirin. The "Kirin" part of his name, meaning giraffe or qilin, had only been given to three previous wrestlers: his own stablemaster (former ōzeki Daikirin), former sekiwake Kirinji, and Tamakirin, who quit sumo to become a professional wrestler.

Wakakirin scored an impressive ten wins in his jūryō debut, but in January 2005 he suffered an anterior cruciate ligament injury that forced him to sit out two tournaments, resulting in demotion back to the unsalaried makushita division. The injury reduced the effectiveness of his favoured tsuppari, or thrusting techniques, and although he returned to the second division in January 2006 he could manage only four wins and was immediately demoted once again.

He slowly returned to full fitness and after a series of solid performances he took his second makushita championship in May 2007 with a perfect 7-0 record from the rank of makushita 3, to earn promotion back to jūryō. After scores of 10-5 in July and 9-6 in September, he was promoted to the top makuuchi division for the November 2007 tournament. In April 2005 Oshiogawa stable was absorbed into Oguruma stable, in anticipation of Oshiogawa Oyakata's retirement the following year. Wakakirin is the third member of Oguruma stable to make his top division debut, following Takekaze and Yoshikaze.

Wakakirin achieved ten wins in his top division debut, a feat that normally wins the Fighting Spirit Award, but he missed out, the prize going to Baruto instead. He was promoted to what was to be his highest rank of maegashira 9 for the January 2008 tournament, but disappointing scores of 4-11 there and 6-9 in March meant he was demoted back to the jūryō division. He missed out on a kachi-koshi winning score on the final day in May 2008, falling to 7-8. He scored 7-8 once again in July. He remained in the top half of jūryō after that, but did not win promotion back to the top division. He produced a good 9-6 score at jūryō 3 in January 2009 but lost to Tamawashi on the final day when a win would have virtually guaranteed a return to makuuchi.

=== Dismissal ===
On January 30, 2009, Wakakirin was arrested for possession of cannabis, at a CD shop in Roppongi that had been monitored by police for some time. The following day, Oguruma, his stable master, declared his intention to dismiss him as a professional sumo wrestler in the wake of the scandal and submitted his letter of resignation to Japan Sumo Association by proxy. The Sumo Association fired him on February 2, deciding on dismissal rather than the heavier penalty of expulsion that would have deprived him of a 5.3 million yen retirement bonus.

This decision split the Association and was criticized by some as being too lenient. However, Wakakirin subsequently apologized and said he would not accept the severance pay. An editorial in the Asahi Shimbun said the newspaper was "appalled by his utter folly" in taking the drug. After being in jail for a month, Wakakirin was released on bail on February 27. He appeared at the Yokohama District Court on April 13 and pleaded guilty to cannabis possession. On April 22 he was given a ten-month prison sentence, suspended for three years. He was believed to be working for a time at his father's restaurant business.

Wakakirin is the fourth wrestler to be dismissed because of cannabis use, following Wakanohō, Rohō and Hakurozan, but the first Japanese. In the same tests in September 2008 that led to Rohō and Hakurozan being dismissed, it was reported that Wakakirin's result was borderline, which put the wrestler under suspicion.

The March 2009 banzuke or ranking list had a blank space where Wakakirin's name should have been (jūryō 1 West). This previously occurred with Wakanohō and Tokitsuumi, who retired between tournaments after the expulsion of his stablemaster.

=== Fighting style ===
Wakakirin was a oshi-sumo wrestler whose favourite technique was tsuppari, or a series of rapid thrusts to the opponent's chest. His most common winning kimarite were oshidashi (push out) and tsuki dashi (thrust out).

== Professional wrestling career ==
In 2010, Wakakirin, still using his sumo name returned to the ring as a professional wrestler, training in Antonio Inoki's Inoki Genome Federation (IGF) stable. His first match was on the IGF-13 card in December, when he defeated Mark Coleman by referee stop. The match was controversial, and Coleman's colleague, Phil Baroni accused Wakakirin of shooting on Coleman in what was supposed to be a worked match. He made his comments on this on the Nightmare of Battle website.

Wakakirin's next fight was scheduled for December 31, 2010, against Bob Sapp, but the match never took place as Sapp refused to leave his dressing room. He was also scheduled to face Kimbo Slice on February 5, 2011, in Fukuoka, but that fight never took place as Kimbo went down with an injury. In 2011 he was named the sport's rookie of the year by Tokyo Sports.

His first MMA fight was in December 2012 when he lost to Mirko Cro Cop. In April 2014 he was defeated by Bob Armstrong at Inoki Genome Fight.

In October 2013 he formed a tag team with fellow ex-sumo wrestler Kirinowaka.

He left the IGF in 2017 and participated in a martial arts event run by the ISM, Inoki's new company.

In March 2021, and May 2025, he was arrested again on suspicion of possessing cannabis. Following his arrest in May 2025, the Tokyo District Public Prosecutors Office decided not to prosecute Wakakirin, without explaining its reasons.

== Sumo career record ==
Wakakirin Shinichi
Year	January Hatsu basho, Tokyo	March Haru basho, Osaka	May Natsu basho, Tokyo	July Nagoya basho, Nagoya	September Aki basho, Tokyo	November Kyūshū basho, Fukuoka
1999	x	(Maezumo)	East Jonokuchi #30; 4–3	West Jonidan #161; 2–5	East Jonokuchi #21; 2–5	East Jonokuchi #30; 5–2
2000	East Jonidan #122; 3–4	West Jonidan #134; 5–2	East Jonidan #79; 1–6	West Jonidan #106; 4–3	East Jonidan #79; 4–3	West Jonidan #53; 3–4
2001	East Jonidan #82; 5–2	West Jonidan #39; 5–2	East Jonidan #4; 3–4	East Jonidan #18; 6–1	East Sandanme #56; 3–4	West Sandanme #78; 5–2
2002	West Sandanme #46; 4–3	West Sandanme #32; 4–3	East Sandanme #20; 5–2	West Makushita #57; 3–4	West Sandanme #14; 5–2	East Makushita #48; 3–4
2003	West Sandanme #3; 2–5	West Sandanme #29; 5–2	West Sandanme #2; 6–1	East Makushita #29; 3–4	West Makushita #39; 4–3	East Makushita #31; 5–2
2004	West Makushita #18; 4–3	East Makushita #16; 4–3	East Makushita #12; 5–2	East Makushita #2; 4–3	West Jūryō #13; 10–5	West Jūryō #9; 7–8
2005	East Jūryō #10; 7–8	East Jūryō #11; Sat out due to injury 0–0–15	East Makushita #10; Sat out due to injury 0–0–7	West Makushita #50; 4–3	East Makushita #42; 7–0; Champion	West Makushita #3; 4–3
2006	East Jūryō #14; 4–11	East Makushita #6; 2–5	East Makushita #18; 2–5	West Makushita #32; 5–2	East Makushita #20; 4–3	East Makushita #13; 4–3
2007	East Makushita #9; 4–3	West Makushita #7; 5–2	West Makushita #3; 7–0; Champion	West Jūryō #9; 10–5	West Jūryō #2; 9–6	West Maegashira #15; 10–5
2008	West Maegashira #9; 4–11	East Maegashira #15; 6–9	East Jūryō #1; 7–8	East Jūryō #2; 7–8	East Jūryō #4; 6–9	West Jūryō #6; 9–6
2009	East Jūryō #3; 9–6	Dismissed	x	x	x	x
Record given as wins–losses–absences Top division champion Top division runner-up Retired Lower divisions Non-participation Sanshō key: F=Fighting spirit; O=Outstanding performance; T=Technique Also shown: ★=Kinboshi; P=Playoff(s); Divisions: Makuuchi — Jūryō — Makushita — Sandanme — Jonidan — Jonokuchi Makuuchi ranks: Yokozuna — Ōzeki — Sekiwake — Komusubi — Maegashira

== Mixed martial arts record ==
Professional record breakdown
6 matches	2 wins	4 losses
By knockout	2	3
By submission	0	1
By decision	0	0

Res.	Record	Opponent	Method	Event	Date	Round	Time	Location	Notes
Loss	2–4	Chris Barnett	TKO (punches)	Inoki Bom-Ba-Ye 2015	December 31, 2015	1	1:44	Tokyo, Japan	
Win	2–3	Ik Tae Jin	TKO (punches)	Inoki Genome Fight 3	April 11, 2015	1	0:18	Tokyo, Japan	IGF World Grand Prix Reserve Bout
Loss	1–3	Chris Barnett	TKO (punches)	Inoki Bom-Ba-Ye 2014	December 31, 2014	1	1:57	Tokyo, Japan	
Win	1–2	Ikuhisa Minowa	TKO (corner stoppage)	Inoki Genome Fight 2	August 23, 2014	2	0:59	Tokyo, Japan	
Loss	0–2	Bob Armstrong	KO (punch)	Inoki Genome Fight 1	April 5, 2014	1	2:00	Tokyo, Japan	
Loss	0–1	Mirko Cro Cop	Submission (armbar)	Inoki Bom-Ba-Ye 2012	December 31, 2012	1	1:18	Tokyo, Japan	

== Championships and accomplishments ==
- Tokyo Sports
  - Newcomer Award (2011)

== See also ==
- Glossary of sumo terms
- List of past sumo wrestlers
