= Kimikaze Toshiji =

Japanese sumo wrestler

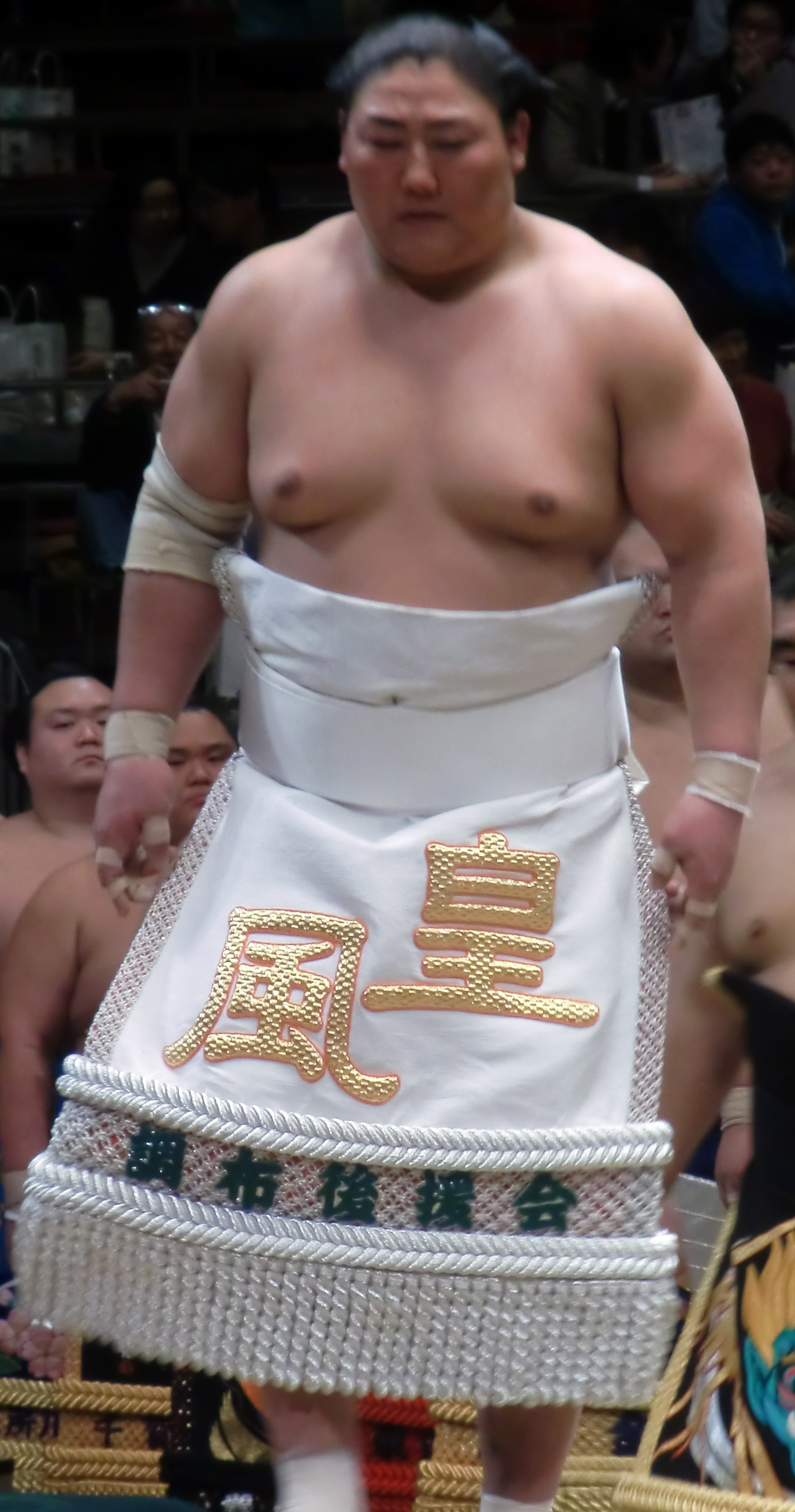

Personal information
- Native name: 皇風 俊司
- Born: Toshiji Naoe; 23 September 1986 (age 40) Chōfu, Tokyo, Japan
- Height: 1.82 m (5 ft 11 1/2 in)
- Weight: 133 kg (293 lb; 20.9 st)

Sport
- Sport: Sumo
- University team: Waseda University
- Retired: May, 2014
- Heya: Oguruma
- Record: 141-112-20
- Debut: January, 2009
- Highest rank: Maegashira 13 (May, 2012)
- Championships: 1 (Jūryō); 1 (Makushita)
- Updated on June 2014

Kimikaze Toshiji (皇風 俊司) (born 23 September 1986 as Toshiji Naoe) is a former professional sumo wrestler from Chōfu, Tokyo, Japan. His highest rank was maegashira 13. He won the jūryō championship in March 2012.

== Career ==
He was the first professional sumo wrestler from Waseda University in 78 years. He joined Oguruma stable in January 2009, recruited by former ozeki Kotokaze. He was promoted to the juryo division in July 2011 after winning the makushita division championship or yusho with a perfect 7-0 record. At this point he changed his shikona from his family name of Naoe to Kimikaze. After winning the juryo championship in March 2012 with a 12-3 record, he was promoted to the top makuuchi division. He had to withdraw from his debut tournament in the top division on the 13th day and never managed to return to makuuchi. He is the first wrestler since Sakaizawa to have to withdraw from his only top division tournament.

== Retirement from sumo ==
Due to persistent injuries, including a torn rotator cuff in his right shoulder, he announced his retirement in May 2014. His danpatsu-shiki or official retirement ceremony took place on June 22, 2014 at the Tokyo Metropolitan Hotel with around 230 guests taking part in the hair-cutting. His marriage was announced at the event. After leaving sumo he returned to his hometown of Chofu to open a sumo-themed restaurant.

== Fighting style ==
Kimikaze was an oshi-sumo specialist, preferring pushing techniques to fighting on the mawashi or belt. His most common winning kimarite was oshi-dashi (push out) but he was also very reliant on slap downs (hataki-komi).

== Career record ==
Kimikaze Toshiji
Year	January Hatsu basho, Tokyo	March Haru basho, Osaka	May Natsu basho, Tokyo	July Nagoya basho, Nagoya	September Aki basho, Tokyo	November Kyūshū basho, Fukuoka
2009	(Maezumo)	East Jonokuchi #25; 5–2	West Jonidan #90; 6–1	East Jonidan #15; 6–1	East Sandanme #54; 6–1	West Sandanme #3; 4–3
2010	East Makushita #57; 5–2	West Makushita #43; 3–4	West Makushita #51; 4–3	West Makushita #43; 4–3	East Makushita #34; 5–2	East Makushita #21; 6–1–PP
2011	West Makushita #7; 3–4	Tournament Cancelled; 0–0–0	West Makushita #15; 4–3	West Makushita #5; 7–0; Champion	West Jūryō #8; 8–7	West Jūryō #6; 6–7–2
2012	East Jūryō #9; 8–7	West Jūryō #7; 12–3; Champion	West Maegashira #13; 5–8–2	West Jūryō #2; 2–7–6	West Jūryō #13; 3–12	East Makushita #7; 3–4
2013	West Makushita #11; 2–5	East Makushita #21; 3–4	West Makushita #32; 6–1	West Makushita #13; 5–2	East Makushita #9; 3–4	West Makushita #13; 4–3
2014	West Makushita #9; 2–2–3	East Makushita #22; 1–6	West Makushita #51; Retired; 0–0–5	x	x	x
Record given as wins–losses–absences Top division champion Top division runner-up Retired Lower divisions Non-participation Sanshō key: F=Fighting spirit; O=Outstanding performance; T=Technique Also shown: ★=Kinboshi; P=Playoff(s); Divisions: Makuuchi — Jūryō — Makushita — Sandanme — Jonidan — Jonokuchi Makuuchi ranks: Yokozuna — Ōzeki — Sekiwake — Komusubi — Maegashira

== See also ==
- List of sumo tournament second division champions
- Glossary of sumo terms
- List of past sumo wrestlers
