= Kotokaze Kōki =

Japanese sumo wrestler (born 1957)

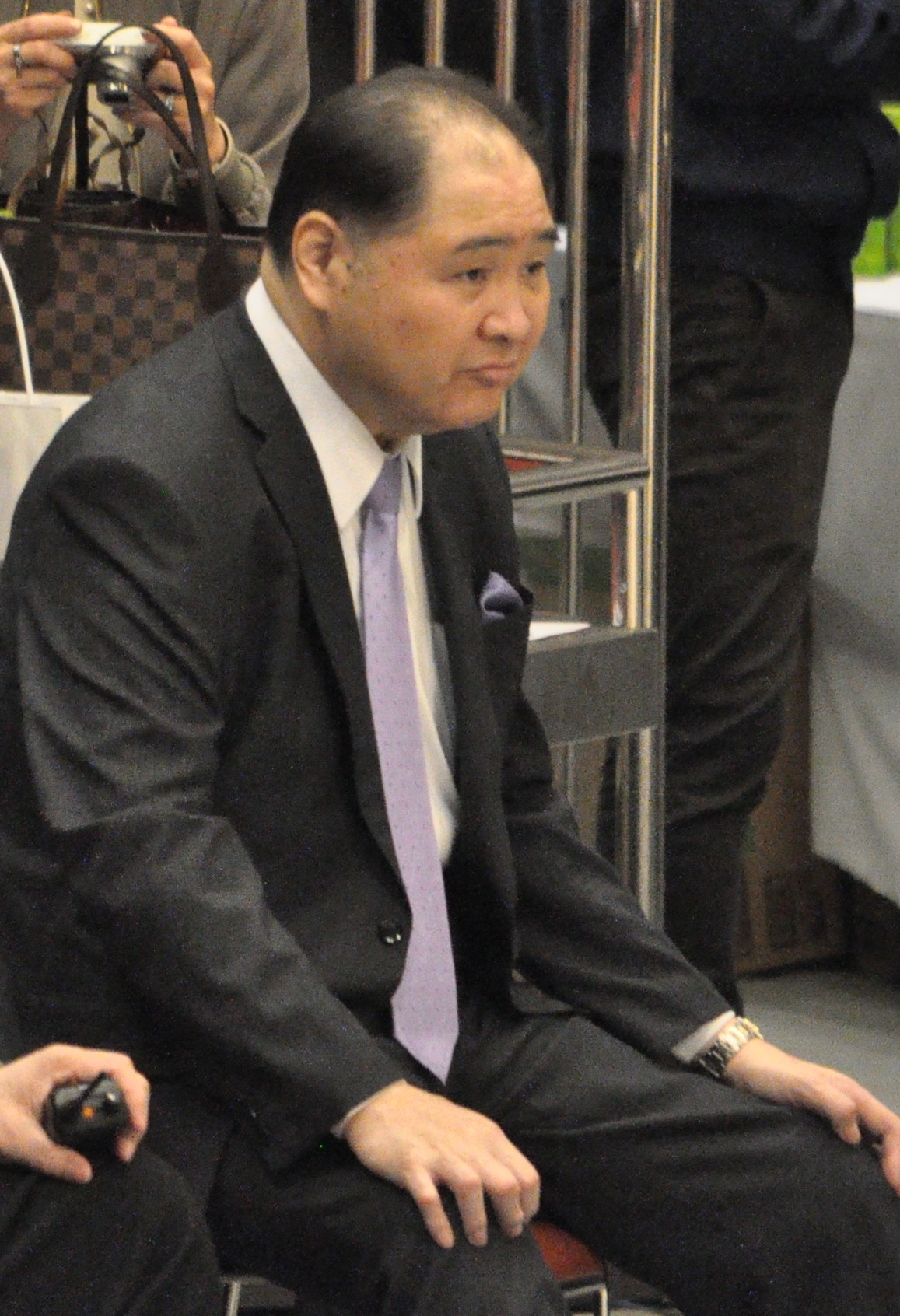
- Kotokaze in May 2017

Personal information
- Native name: 琴風 豪規
- Born: Koichi Nakayama; 26 April 1957 (age 69) Mie, Japan
- Height: 1.84 m (6 ft 1/2 in)
- Weight: 173 kg (381 lb)

Sport
- Sport: Sumo
- Retired: November, 1985
- Heya: Sadogatake
- Record: 561-352-102
- Debut: July, 1971
- Highest rank: Ōzeki (November, 1981)
- Elder name: Oguruma
- Championships: 2 (Makuuchi); 1 (Jūryō); 1 (Makushita)
- Special Prizes: Outstanding Performance (3); Fighting Spirit (2); Technique(1)
- Gold Stars: 6 Kitanoumi (3); Mienoumi; Wajima; Wakanohana II
- Updated on August 2012

Kotokaze Kōki (born 26 April 1957 as Koichi Nakayama) is a former sumo wrestler from Tsu, Mie, Japan. Beginning his career in 1971, he reached the top makuuchi division in 1977 but after a serious injury in 1979 he fell greatly in rank before staging a comeback. His highest rank was ōzeki, which he reached in 1981. He won two tournament championships and was a runner-up in two others. He won six special prizes and six gold stars for defeating yokozuna. He retired in 1985 and became an elder of the Japan Sumo Association and the head coach of Oguruma stable.

== Career ==
Scouted by the 53rd yokozuna Kotozakura, he joined Sadogatake stable in July 1971. He was only 14 years old and still at junior high school, and in his early days in the jonidan division he was excused from fighting some matches to attend school, not travelling to the regional tournaments and fighting only on Sunday in the Tokyo ones. He reached the sekitori level in November 1975 upon promotion to the second highest jūryō division and in January 1977 he made his debut in the top makuuchi division. He got as far as sekiwake before suffering a severe injury to his left knee joint which forced him to miss several tournaments and plunge all the way down to the unsalaried makushita division. He made his way back to the top division in just one year. By March 1981 he had returned to sekiwake and in September 1981 he captured his first tournament championship with a 12–3 record, finishing one win ahead of yokozuna Wakanohana II. He was immediately promoted to sumo's second highest rank of ōzeki. For a brief period in January 1982 he was the only ōzeki on the banzuke, a rare occurrence not seen again until 2020. He took his second championship in January 1983 with a 14–1 score, beating Asashio in a playoff. In September 1984 he defeated a newcomer to the division who was in contention for the tournament title, the gigantic Konishiki, in a mammoth two-minute struggle on the final day. Kotokaze later recalled this bout as his most memorable ever. In May 1985 he suffered another serious injury, this time to his right knee, and he decided to retire in November 1985 at the age of twenty-eight.

== After retirement ==
Kotokaze became an elder of the Sumo Association under the name Oguruma-oyakata. In 1987 he left Sadogatake to set up his own Oguruma stable. He gives all of his new recruits shikona with the suffix "kaze" (wind), taken from his own fighting name. The first wrestler from the stable to achieve sekitori status was Tomikaze in July 2000. As of March 2019, Oguruma stable has produced six wrestlers with top division experience, Takekaze, Yoshikaze, Kimikaze, Amakaze, Yago and Tomokaze. Another, Wakakirin, (who originally came from a different stable) was dismissed from the Sumo Association because of cannabis use in February 2009. Oguruma was demoted from his post in the Sumo Association as a result. In despair he briefly considered closing his stable, but was told by Yoshikaze that he would retire if Oguruma was no longer his stablemaster. In September 2010, two men were arrested for attempting to blackmail Kotokaze, sending him a letter threatening to reveal his connections to a "violent criminal gang" (usually a euphemism for yakuza) in his younger years. In April 2011 he was hit with another demotion after a jūryō division wrestler from his stable, Hoshikaze, was forced to retire after a match-fixing scandal. However, in February 2012 he was elected to the Sumo Association board of directors. In April 2012 he was hospitalized after injuring his cervical spine in a fall at Obama, Fukui. In 2019 he instructed wrestlers that they would no longer be allowed to grow five o'clock shadows during tournaments for superstitious reasons, in order to maintain a suitable appearance on the dohyō. As head of the Sumo Association's legal compliance committee, he announced the one-year suspension for Asanoyama in June 2021 for breaking COVID-19 protocols. Earlier in the same year he had warned that tournaments could be cancelled due to rising COVID-19 infections.

Kotokaze is also a regular commentator on NHK's sumo tournament broadcasts.

Kotokaze announced on 25 December 2021 that his stable would close following the January 2022 sumo tournament. He reached the standard retirement age for an elder of 65 years in April 2022, but was employed for a further five years on a reduced salary as a sanyo or consultant. In May 2024, however, he decided not to make use of his full period of re-employment, and took his final retirement at the age of 67. He entrusted the management of the elder share Oguruma to his original stable, where it was inherited by former maegashira Kotoekō.

In November 2024, he made his debut as a tournament commentator on NHK.

== Fighting style ==
Kotokaze's most common winning kimarite or technique was overwhelmingly a straightforward yori-kiri or force out, which accounted for over half his wins at sekitori level. He favoured hidari-yotsu, or a right hand outside, left hand inside grip on his opponent's mawashi. He very rarely employed throwing moves.

== Career record ==
Kotokaze Koki
| Year | January Hatsu basho, Tokyo | March Haru basho, Osaka | May Natsu basho, Tokyo | July Nagoya basho, Nagoya | September Aki basho, Tokyo | November Kyūshū basho, Fukuoka |
|---|---|---|---|---|---|---|
| 1971 | x | x | x | (Maezumo) | West Jonokuchi #9; 3–4 | East Jonidan #97; 3–1 |
| 1972 | West Jonidan #59; 1–2 | West Jonidan #77 – | West Jonidan #77; 2–1 | East Jonidan #47 – | East Jonidan #46; 1–2 | East Jonidan #54 – |
| 1973 | East Jonidan #54; 3–0 | West Jonidan #19; 3–4 | East Jonidan #32; 6–1 | East Sandanme #69; 4–3 | West Sandanme #52; 5–2 | East Sandanme #24; 5–2 |
| 1974 | East Sandanme #1; 3–4 | East Sandanme #10; 4–3 | East Makushita #57; 3–4 | West Sandanme #8; 3–4 | East Sandanme #18; 5–2 | East Makushita #54; 5–2 |
| 1975 | West Makushita #31; 4–3 | East Makushita #25; 6–1 | West Makushita #8; 5–2 | West Makushita #2; 4–3 | West Makushita #1; 5–2 | West Jūryō #12; 8–7 |
| 1976 | East Jūryō #9; 8–7 | West Jūryō #7; 9–6 | West Jūryō #2; 5–10 | West Jūryō #7; 8–7 | East Jūryō #7; 9–6 | East Jūryō #1; 9–6 |
| 1977 | West Maegashira #11; 8–7 | East Maegashira #6; 9–6 | East Maegashira #1; 5–10 | West Maegashira #7; 8–7 | West Maegashira #5; 8–7 | East Maegashira #1; 10–5; O★ |
| 1978 | West Sekiwake #1; 5–10 | East Maegashira #3; 6–9 ★ | West Maegashira #6; 12–3; O★ | West Sekiwake #1; 7–8 | West Komusubi #1; 7–8 | West Maegashira #1; 0–3–12 |
| 1979 | East Maegashira #13; 3–2–10 | West Jūryō #7; Sat out due to injury 0–0–15 | West Makushita #5; Sat out due to injury 0–0–7 | West Makushita #30; 6–1 | West Makushita #8; 7–0–P; Champion | West Jūryō #11; 14–1; Champion |
| 1980 | West Maegashira #14; 12–3; F | East Maegashira #1; 10–5; F | West Sekiwake #1; 10–5; O | East Sekiwake #1; 6–4–5 | West Maegashira #2; Sat out due to injury 0–0–15 | West Maegashira #2; 7–8 ★ |
| 1981 | West Maegashira #3; 10–5 ★★ | West Sekiwake #1; 9–6 | West Komusubi #1; 9–6 | East Sekiwake #1; 10–5 | East Sekiwake #1; 12–3; T | East Ōzeki; 11–4 |
| 1982 | East Ōzeki #1; 10–5 | East Ōzeki #1; 9–6 | West Ōzeki #1; 9–6 | West Ōzeki #1; 11–4 | East Ōzeki #1; 9–6 | West Ōzeki #1; 10–5 |
| 1983 | West Ōzeki #1; 14–1–P | East Ōzeki #1; 11–4 | West Ōzeki #1; 11–4 | West Ōzeki #2; 12–3 | East Ōzeki #1; 11–4 | West Ōzeki #1; 11–4 |
| 1984 | West Ōzeki #1; 11–4 | West Ōzeki #1; 9–6 | East Ōzeki #2; 9–6 | West Ōzeki #2; 8–7 | West Ōzeki #2; 10–5 | East Ōzeki #2; 10–5 |
| 1985 | East Ōzeki #2; 8–7 | West Ōzeki #2; 5–10 | West Ōzeki #2; 3–4–8 | West Sekiwake #2; Sat out due to injury 0–0–15 | East Sekiwake #2; Sat out due to injury 0–0–15 | East Maegashira #10; Retired; 0–4 |
Record given as wins–losses–absences Top division champion Top division runner-up Retired Lower divisions Non-participation Sanshō key: F=Fighting spirit; O=Outstanding performance; T=Technique Also shown: ★=Kinboshi; P=Playoff(s); Divisions: Makuuchi — Jūryō — Makushita — Sandanme — Jonidan — Jonokuchi Makuuchi ranks: Yokozuna — Ōzeki — Sekiwake — Komusubi — Maegashira

== See also ==
- Glossary of sumo terms
- List of ōzeki
- List of past sumo wrestlers
- List of sumo elders
- List of sumo tournament top division champions
- List of sumo tournament top division runners-up
- List of sumo tournament second division champions
