= Oshiogawa stable =

Defunct sumo stable

Oshiogawa stable (押尾川部屋, Oshiogawa-beya) (1975–2005) was a sumo stable of the Nishonoseki group.

In its modern form it dates from March 1975 when it was founded by Daikirin, a former Nishonoseki stable wrestler. It produced eleven sekitori in total, such as Masurao, Enazakura, Daishi, Wakatoba and Wakakirin. In March 2005, with Oshiogawa approaching the mandatory retirement age and no obvious successor available, the stable was absorbed into the affiliated Oguruma stable.

== History ==
Founded in 1975 by former ōzeki Daikirin after a succession dispute over Nishonoseki stable. The former head coach of Nishonoseki stable Saganohana died in 1975. His heir apparent and successor was thought to be Daikirin but after being unable to come to an agreement with Saganohana's widow. This was because wrestler Kongō who retired at only 28 to marry Saganohana's daughter and take over the stable was the widow's choice as the next head. Daikirin realizing he now had no chance of taking over so instead he broke away and established his own Oshiogawa stable. He attempted to take a number of high-ranking wrestlers with him, such as Aobajō and Tenryū, but Nishonoseki stable objected to this. The Japan Sumo Association intervened and Tenryū was forced to return to Nishonoseki and, disillusioned, quit to become a professional wrestler. The stable would produce its first homegrown sekitori in January 1981 following Kinoarashi promotion to jūryō. This would be followed by Masurao's promotion in July 1983. The stable would continue this trend producing nine more sekitori over time. In March 2005, with Oshiogawa approaching the mandatory retirement age and no obvious successor available, his stable was absorbed into the affiliated Oguruma stable included in this was sekitori Wakatoba and Wakakirin. Oshiogawa retired from his position in the Sumo Association a year before reaching the mandatory retirement age, in June 2006.

== Owner ==
- 1975–2005: 17th Oshiogawa (ōzeki Daikirin)

== Notable members ==
- Aobajō (sekiwake)
- Masurao (sekiwake)
- Enazakura (maegashira 1)
- Kinoarashi (maegashira 2)
- Daishi (maegashira 3)
- Wakakirin (maegashira 9)
- Wakatoba (maegashira 11)
- Hitachiryu (maegashira 14)
- Saganobori (maegashira 14)

== See also ==
- List of sumo stables
- List of sumo elders
- List of active sumo wrestlers
- List of past sumo wrestlers
- List of years in sumo
- Glossary of sumo terms
