= Daishi Nobuyuki =

Japanese sumo wrestler (born 1968)

Personal information
- Native name: 大至 伸行
- Born: Nobuyuki Takano; 23 August 1968 (age 58) Hitachi, Ibaraki, Japan
- Height: 1.82 m (5 ft 11 1/2 in)
- Weight: 163 kg (359 lb)

Sport
- Sport: Sumo
- Retired: March, 2002
- Heya: Oshiogawa
- Record: 574-593-21
- Debut: March, 1984
- Highest rank: Maegashira 3 (July, 1996)
- Updated on Sep. 2012

Daishi Nobuyuki (born 23 August 1968 as Nobuyuki Takano) is a former sumo wrestler from Hitachi, Ibaraki, Japan. He made his professional debut in March 1984, and reached the top division in July 1994. His highest rank was maegashira 3. He retired in March 2002 and remained in the Sumo Association as jun-toshiyori before leaving in June 2003. He is now a professional singer.

== Career ==
He joined Oshiogawa stable in March 1984 after completing junior high school. Fighting under his own surname of Takano, he weighed 114 kg in his debut but he struggled to adapt and his weight dropped to 98 kg by November 1985. He rose slowly up the ranks, adopting the shikona of Daishi in 1987 and steadily increasing his weight to 143 kg by 1992, around average. In May 1993 after nine years in sumo he finally reached sekitori status upon promotion to the juryo division. He reached the top makuuchi division in July 1994. He fought in the top division for 23 tournaments, compiling a record of 145 wins against 191 losses, but never managed to win a special prize or defeat a yokozuna. His highest rank was maegashira 3, which he reached in July 1996. He was demoted from makuuchi in July 1997, but managed to return in September 2000 after three years in juryo. He retired in March 2002 after a 3–12 record at juryo 9 left him facing demotion to makushita.

== Retirement from sumo ==
He remained in sumo as Daishi Oyakata under the jun-toshiyori system, working as a coach at Oshiogawa stable. With his stablemaster, former ozeki Daikirin, due to reach the mandatory retirement age in 2007 it was thought Daishi might be in line to take over the running of the stable. However, he left the Sumo Association in June 2003, ahead of the two year grace period he had to acquire a permanent toshiyori, to launch a career as a professional singer. He had been allowed by the Sumo Association to record a CD and sing at danpatsu-shiki, but only jinku music. He continued to sing to the audience at retirement ceremonies, such as yokozuna Takanohana's in 2003, ozeki Musoyama's in 2005, and Wakatenro’s in 2011. He produced a jinku CD by active top division wrestler Ikioi in 2012. He auditioned for the role of the Genie in Aladdin in 2014.

== Fighting style ==
Daishi favoured yotsu-sumo (grappling techniques), preferring a migi-yotsu (right hand inside, left hand outside) grip on his opponent's mawashi. His most common winning kimarite was a straightforward yori-kiri, or force out.

== Career record ==
Daishi Nobuyuki
Year	January Hatsu basho, Tokyo	March Haru basho, Osaka	May Natsu basho, Tokyo	July Nagoya basho, Nagoya	September Aki basho, Tokyo	November Kyūshū basho, Fukuoka
1984	x	(Maezumo)	West Jonokuchi #15; 6–1	East Jonidan #85; 3–4	East Jonidan #103; 5–2	West Jonidan #60; 5–2
1985	East Jonidan #28; 0–7	East Jonidan #84; 3–4	West Jonidan #99; 6–1	East Jonidan #33; 4–3	East Jonidan #18; 3–4	West Jonidan #32; 4–3
1986	East Jonidan #11; 5–2	West Sandanme #70; 1–6	West Jonidan #7; 6–1	East Sandanme #50; 2–5	West Sandanme #76; 4–3	East Sandanme #54; 4–3
1987	East Sandanme #37; 4–3	East Sandanme #21; Sat out due to injury 0–0–7	West Sandanme #70; 4–3	West Sandanme #52; 3–4	West Sandanme #66; 6–1	West Sandanme #17; 2–5
1988	East Sandanme #44; 4–3	East Sandanme #29; 2–5	East Sandanme #56; 6–1	East Sandanme #8; 2–5	West Sandanme #38; 4–3	West Sandanme #21; 4–3
1989	East Sandanme #8; 3–4	East Sandanme #22; 5–2	East Makushita #56; 4–3	West Makushita #42; 4–3	West Makushita #30; 4–3	West Makushita #19; 3–4
1990	East Makushita #26; 2–5	East Makushita #44; 3–4	East Makushita #56; 5–2	West Makushita #37; 4–3	West Makushita #26; 6–1	East Makushita #10; 5–2
1991	West Makushita #3; 2–5	West Makushita #14; 2–5	West Makushita #33; 4–3	East Makushita #23; 3–4	West Makushita #31; 4–3	West Makushita #21; 3–4
1992	East Makushita #30; 2–2–3	East Makushita #50; 4–3	East Makushita #39; 4–3	West Makushita #27; 5–2	West Makushita #13; 4–3	East Makushita #10; 5–2
1993	East Makushita #3; 4–3	East Makushita #1; 5–2	East Jūryō #10; 6–9	East Jūryō #13; 8–7	East Jūryō #10; 8–7	West Jūryō #7; 8–7
1994	West Jūryō #5; 7–8	West Jūryō #6; 11–4	West Jūryō #1; 8–7	East Maegashira #15; 8–7	West Maegashira #14; 9–6	East Maegashira #6; 6–9
1995	East Maegashira #10; 8–7	East Maegashira #5; 3–12	East Maegashira #15; 8–7	East Maegashira #14; 8–7	East Maegashira #10; 8–7	East Maegashira #4; 3–12
1996	West Maegashira #13; 8–7	West Maegashira #7; 6–9	East Maegashira #11; 10–5	East Maegashira #3; 4–11	West Maegashira #7; 6–9	West Maegashira #13; 9–6
1997	East Maegashira #11; 8–7	West Maegashira #5; 5–10	East Maegashira #9; 5–10	West Maegashira #14; 2–4–9	West Jūryō #6; 6–9	West Jūryō #9; 9–6
1998	East Jūryō #4; 6–9	West Jūryō #7; 5–8–2	West Jūryō #11; 10–5–P	West Jūryō #3; 6–9	East Jūryō #6; 7–8	East Jūryō #7; 8–7
1999	West Jūryō #5; 6–9	East Jūryō #9; 8–7	West Jūryō #6; 6–9	West Jūryō #10; 9–6	West Jūryō #7; 7–8	East Jūryō #9; 8–7
2000	East Jūryō #5; 5–10	East Jūryō #9; 8–7	East Jūryō #5; 8–7	East Jūryō #3; 10–5	West Maegashira #14; 5–10	East Jūryō #3; 9–6
2001	East Maegashira #13; 7–8	West Maegashira #14; 4–11	West Jūryō #5; 8–7	East Jūryō #1; 8–7	East Maegashira #15; 5–10	East Jūryō #4; 6–9
2002	East Jūryō #7; 6–9	East Jūryō #9; Retired; 3–12	x	x	x	x
Record given as wins–losses–absences Top division champion Top division runner-up Retired Lower divisions Non-participation Sanshō key: F=Fighting spirit; O=Outstanding performance; T=Technique Also shown: ★=Kinboshi; P=Playoff(s); Divisions: Makuuchi — Jūryō — Makushita — Sandanme — Jonidan — Jonokuchi Makuuchi ranks: Yokozuna — Ōzeki — Sekiwake — Komusubi — Maegashira

== See also ==
- Glossary of sumo terms
- List of past sumo wrestlers
