= Takekaze Akira =

Japanese sumo wrestler

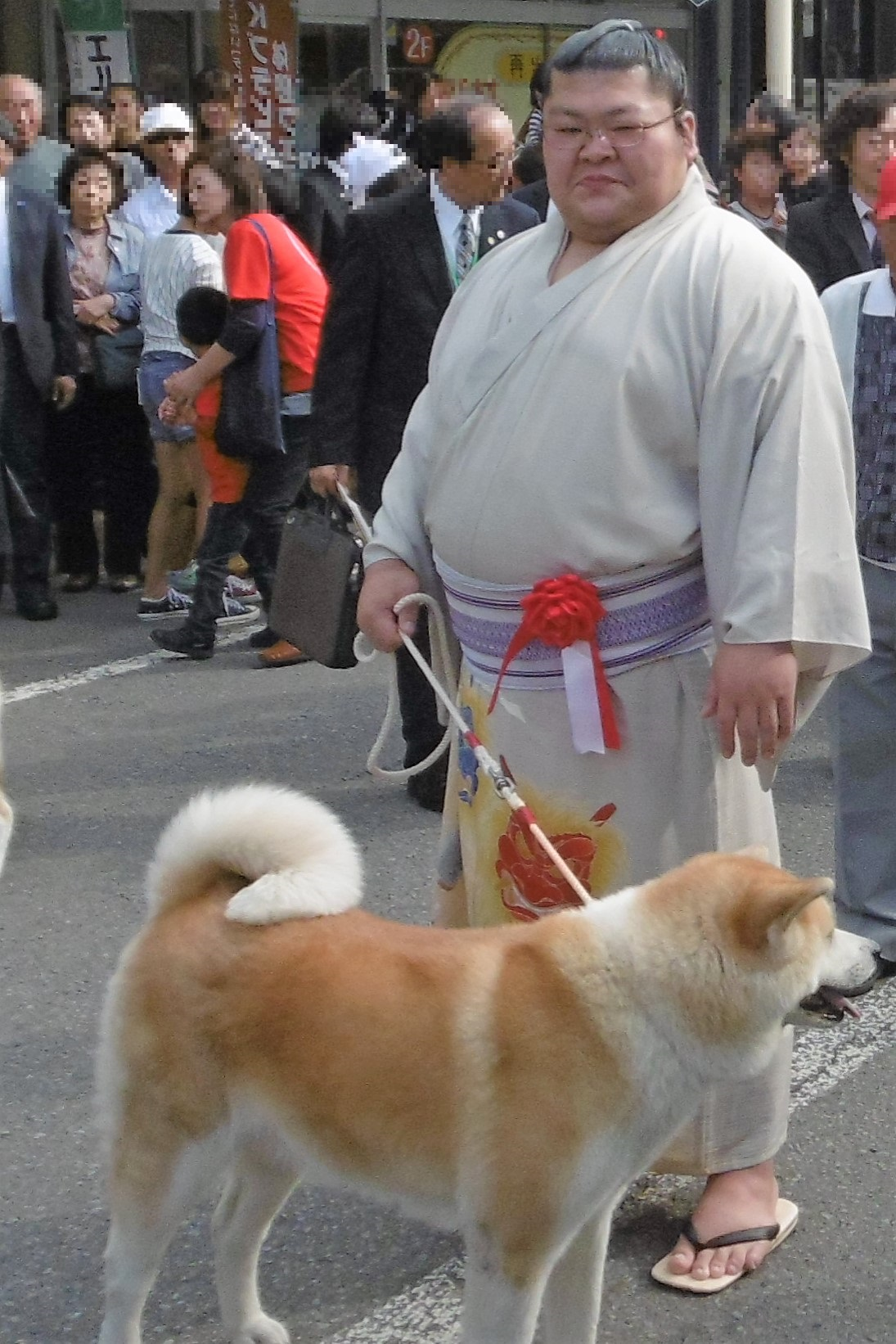
- Takekaze in 2016

Personal information
- Native name: 豪風 旭
- Born: Akira Narita; June 21, 1979 (age 47) Akita, Japan
- Height: 1.72 m (5 ft 7 1/2 in)
- Weight: 152 kg (335 lb; 23.9 st)

Sport
- Sport: Sumo
- University team: Chuo University
- Retired: January 2019
- Heya: Oguruma
- Record: 687–745–46
- Debut: May 2002
- Highest rank: Sekiwake (September, 2014)
- Elder name: Oshiogawa
- Championships: 1 (Jūryō)
- Special Prizes: Fighting Spirit (2)
- Gold Stars: 1 (Harumafuji)
- Updated on Jan 22, 2019

Takekaze Akira (born June 21, 1979 as Akira Narita) is a former professional sumo wrestler from Akita Prefecture, Japan. A former amateur sumo champion, he turned professional in 2002, reaching the top makuuchi division the following year. He was a runner-up in one tournament, earned two special prizes for Fighting Spirit, and one gold star for defeating a yokozuna. Takekaze is in first place for the slowest promotion from makuuchi debut to the third highest sekiwake rank in history. Aged 35 years and two months, he is in first place for the eldest to make his sekiwake debut post World War II. He was a member of Oguruma stable. He retired in January 2019 to become an elder of the Japan Sumo Association under the name Oshiogawa-oyakata and is the owner of Oshiogawa stable.

== Early life and sumo background ==
Born in Moriyoshi, Kitaakita District, Narita practised sumo in college and was a very dominant player, having achieved the student equivalent of yokozuna after winning the Kokutai (Japan Games) and All Japan University Championship sumo tournaments in 2001, his fourth year at Chuo University. He made his professional debut in May 2002, joining former ōzeki Kotokaze's Oguruma stable.

== Career ==
Upon entry he was given makushita tsukedashi status and allowed to enter at the rank of makushita 15 due to his amateur achievements. He reached sekitori level in just two tournaments, and was promoted to the top makuuchi division in March 2003, the first wrestler from his stable to achieve this.

Takekaze had to pull out of his debut tournament in the top division due to injury and fell back to the jūryō division. However upon winning the jūryō championship in September 2003 with a 13–2 record he was promoted back to the top division. He took time to adjust to the stronger opposition in makuuchi and did not achieve a kachi-koshi or winning record above the mid maegashira ranks until May 2007. However, in January 2008 he produced his best score in the top division, 12–3, which included a defeat of ōzeki Kotoōshū. He was awarded his first special prize, for Fighting Spirit. Consequently, in the March, 2008 tournament he debuted at the komusubi rank, finally breaking into san'yaku. He was the first wrestler from his stable to make the titled ranks.

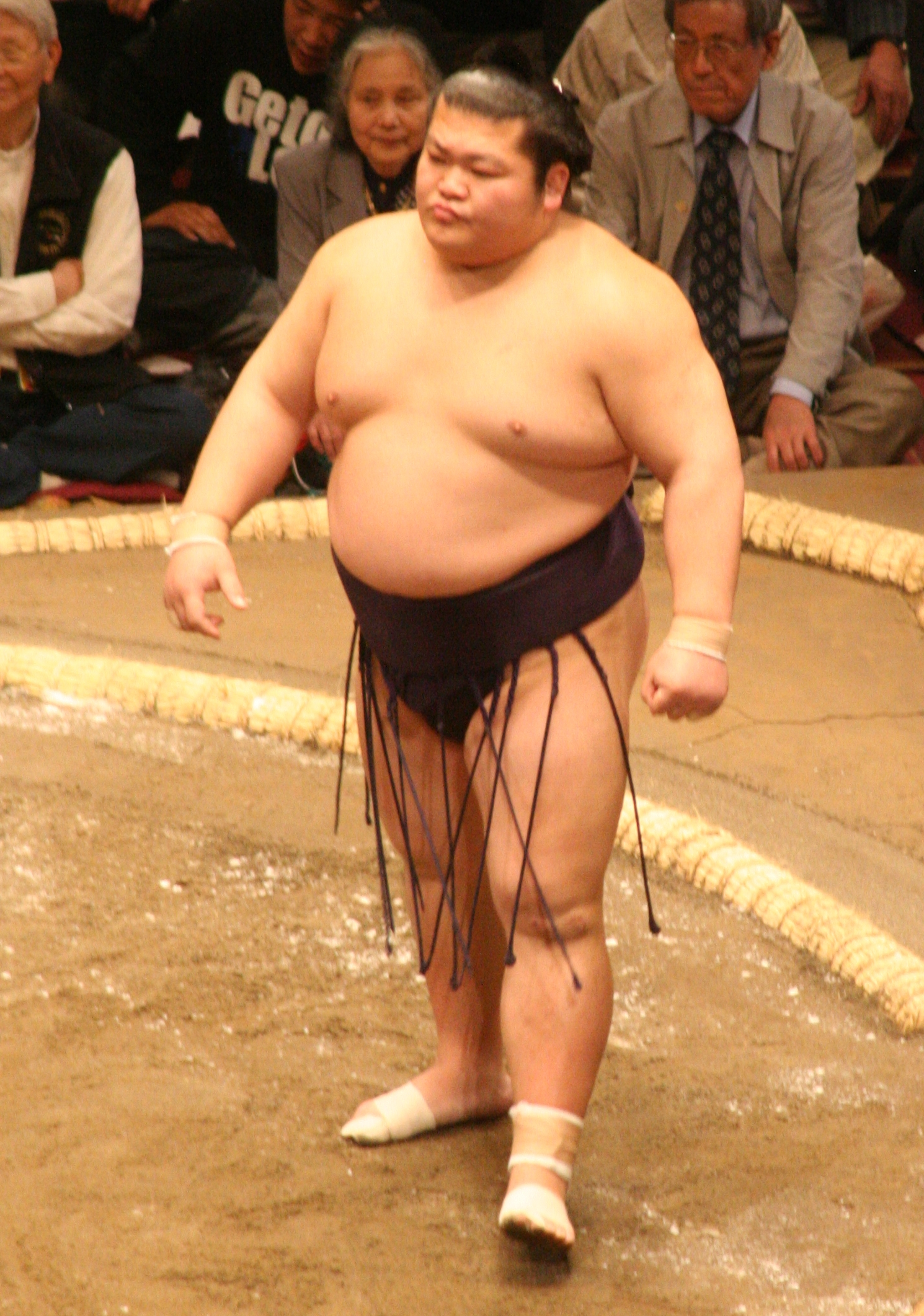
Takekaze in May 2009.

Takekaze could manage only three wins in his komusubi debut and was demoted to maegashira 8 for the May 2008 tournament. However, an 8–7 score at maegashira 4 in March 2009, which included a defeat of ōzeki Kotomitsuki, saw him climb to maegashira 2 for the May 2009 tournament. He also reached maegashira 1 in November 2009. In September 2010 he finished runner-up in a tournament for the first time, and was awarded his second Fighting Spirit prize, shared with stablemate Yoshikaze.

In July 2014 Takekaze earned his first kinboshi or gold star for a defeat of a yokozuna with a win over Harumafuji. His 9–6 score at maegashira 4 was enough to earn him promotion to sekiwake for the first time, as everyone else in the division from sekiwake down to maegashira 3 had a losing score, with the exception of sekiwake Gōeidō who was promoted to ōzeki. Not only did Takekaze become the oldest sekiwake debutant since the end of World War II at the age of 35 years two months, but the 64 tournaments it took to reach the sekiwake rank from his top division debut is also a record. He performed creditably in the September 2014 tournament, only just missing out on kachi-koshi with a 7–8 record. He remained in the san'yaku ranks at komusubi for the following tournament in November, but could only score 2–13. In 2015 he managed only two winning tournaments and dropped down the rankings. By January 2016 he had fallen to maegashira 13, his lowest rank for seven years but secured his top division status with a 10–5 result. He went on to secure four winning records out of six tournaments in 2016.

In September 2017 Takekaze appeared in his 83rd top division tournament, a record for a college graduate and 10th all-time. He has also fought more top division matches than any other former amateur champion and is in the top ten all-time. His 5–10 record in the January 2018 tournament saw him demoted to jūryō for the first time since 2005, but he resolved to continue wrestling, and earned immediate promotion back to makuuchi, becoming at 38 years and 10 months the second oldest wrestler to do so since the beginning of the Showa era after Aminishiki. However he lasted only one tournament and was demoted back to jūryō after the May 2018 basho.

== Retirement from sumo ==
He announced his retirement during the January 2019 tournament after his eighth loss at the low rank of jūryō 12 made demotion to the makushita division virtually certain. He is the owner of the Oshiogawa toshiyori kabu and stayed in sumo as a coach at Oguruma stable. His danpatsu-shiki was held in front of a 9000 crowd at the Ryōgoku Kokugikan on 1 February 2020, with his son taking part in a bout with him, and around 200 to 300 people participating in the hair-snipping ritual.

In February 2022 Oguruma stable closed and he branched out to open his own Oshiogawa stable, taking former makuuchi wrestlers Yago and Amakaze and a number of other personnel with him.

== Fighting style ==
Takekaze was almost entirely reliant on oshi-sumo or pushing techniques, and usually lost if his opponents grabbed hold of his mawashi or belt. He commented, "Sumo at the mawashi is not my style – I haven't learned to do it." He has won only around four percent of his career matches by yori-kiri (force out), which is the most popular overall technique in sumo. As well as oshi-dashi (push out) he also regularly employed hiki-otoshi, the pull-down, and tsuki-otoshi, the thrust over. At just 172 cm (5 ft 7 1/2 in) he was of the shortest wrestlers in the top division.

== Personal life ==
Takekaze was married in August 2006. He has a son, born at the end of 2007.

== Career record ==
Takekaze Akira
| Year | January Hatsu basho, Tokyo | March Haru basho, Osaka | May Natsu basho, Tokyo | July Nagoya basho, Nagoya | September Aki basho, Tokyo | November Kyūshū basho, Fukuoka |
|---|---|---|---|---|---|---|
| 2002 | x | x | Makushita tsukedashi #15; 6–1 | West Makushita #3; 4–3 | West Jūryō #12; 8–7 | East Jūryō #10; 10–5 |
| 2003 | West Jūryō #3; 10–5 | West Maegashira #13; 1–3–11 | East Jūryō #8; Sat out due to injury 0–0–15 | East Jūryō #8; 9–6 | East Jūryō #5; 13–2; Champion | West Maegashira #11; 9–6 |
| 2004 | West Maegashira #6; 4–11 | West Maegashira #11; 9–6 | East Maegashira #8; 9–6 | East Maegashira #5; 6–9 | West Maegashira #7; 8–7 | West Maegashira #6; 6–9 |
| 2005 | West Maegashira #8; Sat out due to injury 0–0–15 | East Jūryō #3; 11–4 | East Maegashira #15; 9–6 | East Maegashira #11; 8–7 | East Maegashira #9; 7–8 | West Maegashira #9; 9–6 |
| 2006 | East Maegashira #3; 4–11 | West Maegashira #9; 9–6 | West Maegashira #4; 2–13 | West Maegashira #13; 9–6 | East Maegashira #10; 10–5 | East Maegashira #4; 6–9 |
| 2007 | West Maegashira #8; 8–7 | West Maegashira #4; 7–8 | East Maegashira #5; 8–7 | East Maegashira #3; 4–11 | East Maegashira #8; 9–6 | East Maegashira #5; 6–9 |
| 2008 | East Maegashira #7; 12–3; F | West Komusubi #1; 3–12 | West Maegashira #8; 6–9 | East Maegashira #12; 7–8 | East Maegashira #14; 9–6 | East Maegashira #8; 9–6 |
| 2009 | East Maegashira #3; 7–8 | East Maegashira #4; 8–7 | East Maegashira #2; 4–11 | East Maegashira #9; 8–7 | West Maegashira #5; 9–6 | East Maegashira #1; 6–9 |
| 2010 | West Maegashira #4; 6–9 | West Maegashira #8; 5–10 | East Maegashira #12; 8–7 | East Maegashira #11; 6–9 | West Maegashira #12; 12–3; F | West Maegashira #4; 6–9 |
| 2011 | East Maegashira #7; 8–7 | Tournament Cancelled; 0–0–0 | West Maegashira #4; 7–8 | West Maegashira #4; 8–7 | East Maegashira #3; 5–10 | West Maegashira #7; 10–5 |
| 2012 | East Maegashira #1; 4–11 | West Maegashira #8; 9–6 | West Maegashira #3; 7–8 | West Maegashira #4; 7–8 | West Maegashira #5; 8–7 | West Maegashira #3; 4–11 |
| 2013 | West Maegashira #9; 6–9 | East Maegashira #11; 9–6 | West Maegashira #6; 9–6 | East Maegashira #1; 1–9–5 | East Maegashira #11; 9–6 | West Maegashira #3; 7–8 |
| 2014 | West Maegashira #4; 6–9 | West Maegashira #6; 9–6 | West Maegashira #1; 6–9 | West Maegashira #4; 9–6 ★ | West Sekiwake #1; 7–8 | East Komusubi #1; 2–13 |
| 2015 | West Maegashira #9; 9–6 | East Maegashira #4; 4–11 | East Maegashira #8; 8–7 | West Maegashira #4; 5–10 | East Maegashira #8; 5–10 | East Maegashira #12; 7–8 |
| 2016 | East Maegashira #13; 10–5 | East Maegashira #7; 5–10 | East Maegashira #12; 8–7 | West Maegashira #8; 6–9 | West Maegashira #9; 8–7 | East Maegashira #7; 9–6 |
| 2017 | East Maegashira #5; 10–5 | East Maegashira #1; 5–10 | East Maegashira #6; 4–11 | West Maegashira #12; 8–7 | West Maegashira #10; 6–9 | East Maegashira #13; 7–8 |
| 2018 | East Maegashira #13; 5–10 | West Jūryō #1; 9–6 | West Maegashira #14; 6–9 | East Jūryō #1; 4–11 | West Jūryō #6; 6–9 | East Jūryō #9; 6–9 |
| 2019 | East Jūryō #12; Retired; 1–9 | x | x | x | x | x |
Record given as wins–losses–absences Top division champion Top division runner-up Retired Lower divisions Non-participation Sanshō key: F=Fighting spirit; O=Outstanding performance; T=Technique Also shown: ★=Kinboshi; P=Playoff(s); Divisions: Makuuchi — Jūryō — Makushita — Sandanme — Jonidan — Jonokuchi Makuuchi ranks: Yokozuna — Ōzeki — Sekiwake — Komusubi — Maegashira

== See also ==
- List of sumo tournament top division runners-up
- List of sumo tournament second division champions
- List of sumo record holders
- Glossary of sumo terms
- List of past sumo wrestlers
- List of sekiwake
- List of sumo elders
