= Oguruma stable =

Defunct sumo stable

Coordinates: 35.6833°N 139.7966°E

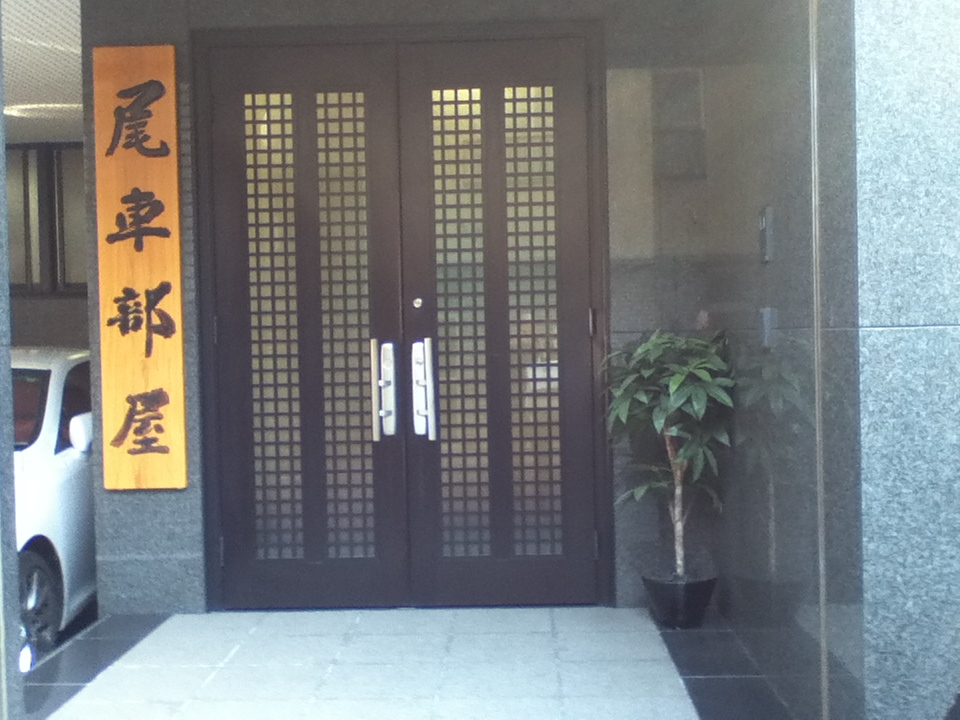
Entrance to Oguruma Stable

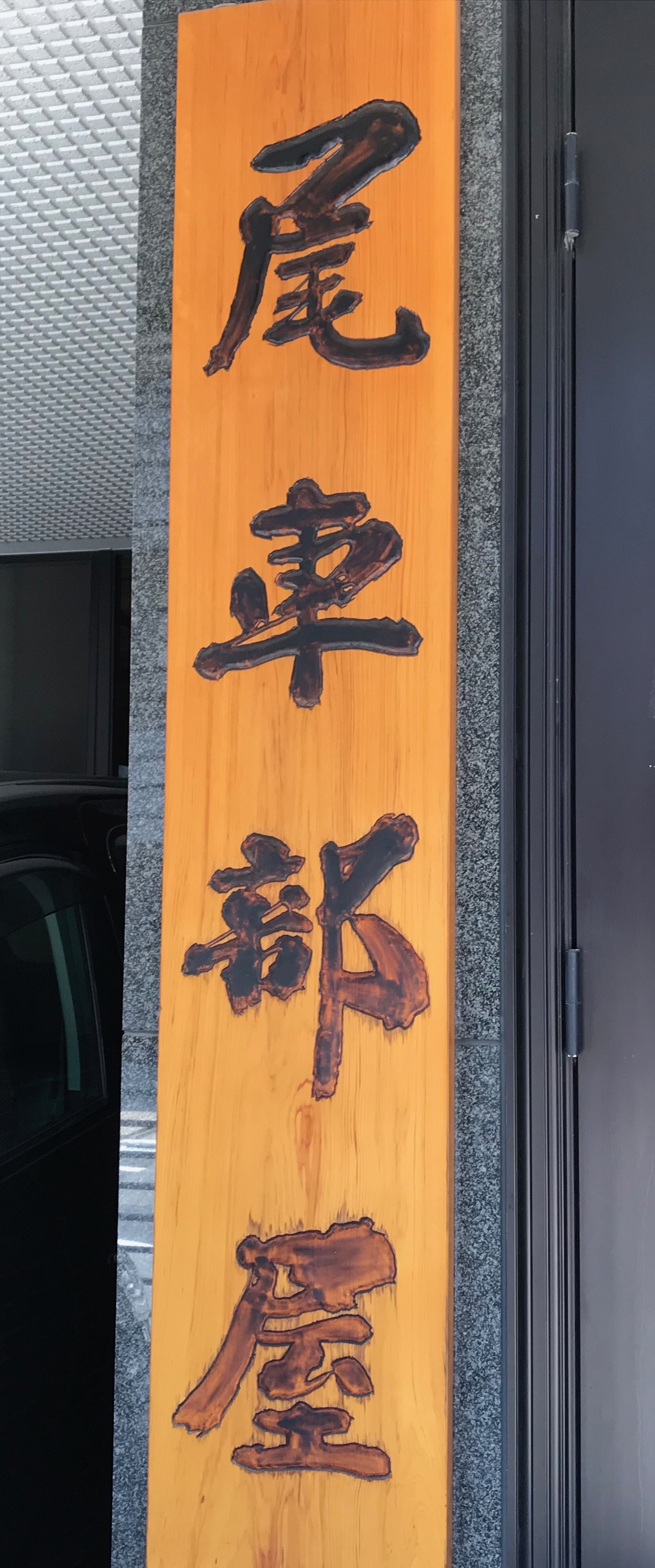

Oguruma stable (尾車部屋, Oguruma-beya) (1987–2022) was a sumo stable of the Nishonoseki group.

In its modern form it existed from March 1987 when it was founded by Kotokaze, a former Sadogatake stable wrestler, until February 2022. The first wrestler from the stable to achieve sekitori status was Tomikaze in July 2000. Initially the stable had a policy of not accepting foreign born wrestlers or college recruits, but this was waived when Chuo University graduate Takekaze personally asked to join in 2002. Their first foreigner was the Mongolian Hoshikaze, who joined in the same year and eventually reached jūryō but was thrown out of sumo after the 2011 match-fixing scandal. The stable absorbed Oshiogawa stable in 2005 ahead of the retirement of Oshiogawa-oyakata, with Wakakirin and Wakatoba among the wrestlers transferring over. As of January 2022, it has 14 wrestlers. The stable produced seven makuuchi or top division wrestlers - Takekaze, Yoshikaze, Wakakirin, Kimikaze, Amakaze, Yago and Tomokaze.

Kotokaze announced on 25 December 2021 that Oguruma stable would close following the January 2022 sumo tournament. The closure officially took place on 7 February 2022, with the stable's personnel being split between a new Oshiogawa stable run by the former Takekaze, and Nishonoseki stable, with the former Yoshikaze assisting the coaching there.

== Ring name conventions ==
Almost all wrestlers at this stable took ring names or shikona that end with the character 風 (read: kaze), meaning "wind" or "breeze", in deference to their coach and the stable's owner, the former Kotokaze.

== Owner ==
- 1987–2022: 8th Oguruma (riji, ōzeki Kotokaze)

== Notable former wrestlers ==
- Takekaze (sekiwake)
- Yoshikaze (sekiwake)
- Kimikaze (maegashira)

== Coaches ==
- Nakamura Masatsugu (toshiyori, sekiwake Yoshikaze)
- Oshiogawa Akira (toshiyori, sekiwake Takekaze)

== Assistant ==
- Nishikikaze (sewanin, makushita, real name Yasuyuki Adachi, born 1978)

== Usher ==
- Rokurō (jūryō yobidashi, real name Kenzō Araki)

== Hairdresser ==
- Tokogō (1st class tokoyama)

== Location and access ==
Tokyo, Edogawa ward, Kiyosumi 2-15-5
3 minutes from Kiyosumi-shirakawa Station on the Toei Ōedo Line and Hanzōmon Line

== See also ==
- List of sumo stables
- List of sumo elders
- List of active sumo wrestlers
- List of past sumo wrestlers
- List of years in sumo
- Glossary of sumo terms
