= Yago Takanori =

Japanese sumo wrestler

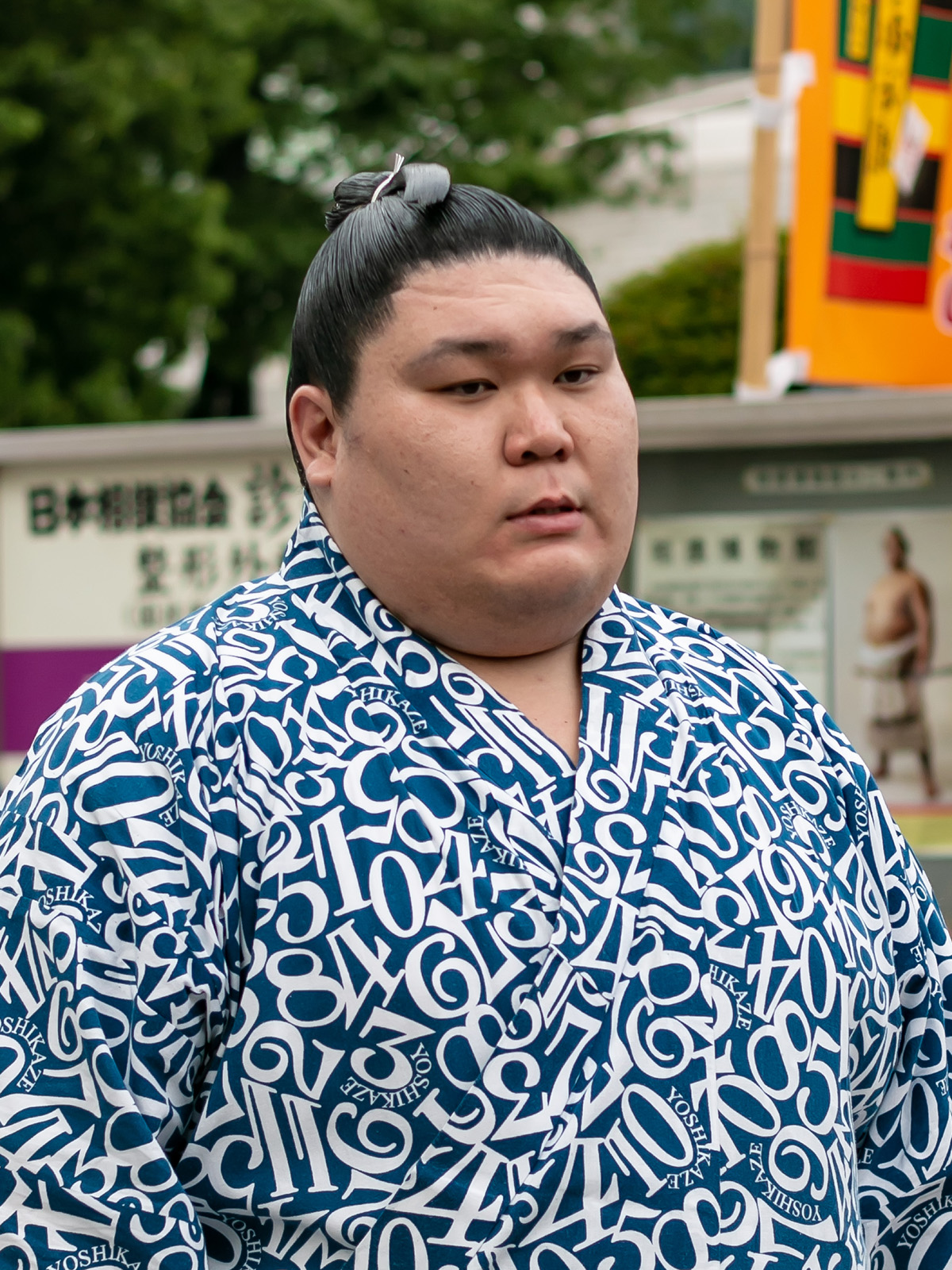
- Yago in 2019

Personal information
- Native name: 矢後 太規
- Born: Takanori Yago; July 8, 1994 (age 32) Hokkaidō
- Height: 188 cm (6 ft 2 in)
- Weight: 172.4 kg (380 lb)

Sport
- Sport: Sumo
- University team: Chuo University
- Retired: September 2026
- Heya: Oguruma→Oshiogawa
- Debut: May 2017
- Highest rank: Maegashira 10 (March 2019)
- Championships: 1 (Makushita); 1 (Jonidan)
- Updated on September 25, 2026

Yago Takanori (Japanese: 矢後 太規; born 8 July 1994) is a Japanese former professional sumo wrestler from Memuro, Hokkaido. He was an amateur champion at Chuo University and won the amateur yokozuna title at the All-Japan Sumo Championships in December 2016. He made his professional debut in May 2017, joining Oguruma stable. He reached the jūryō division in September 2017 and the top makuuchi division in January 2019. His highest rank has been maegashira 10. Yago retired during the September 2026 tournament.

== Early life ==
He was born in Memuro, Kasai District, Hokkaido, the second of three children. This was also the hometown of yokozuna Ōnokuni. He started swimming from kindergarten, and also did judo. He began participating in local sumo tournaments from the fifth grade of elementary school. He was already 180 cm (5 ft 11 in) and 120 kilograms (260 lb) upon graduation from elementary school. At Memuro junior high he won the Hokkaido Junior High School Championships three years running, he suffered major cruciate ligament injuries in his knee, and was praised by the director of his high school sumo club for working hard at rehabilitation from the injury without complaining. He enrolled at Saitama Sakae High School, known for its prowess in sumo with ōzeki Gōeidō among its alumni. He left his parents house at this time and lived in a dormitory with other students. After graduating from high school he entered the law department of Chuo University and was the captain of the sumo club by his fourth year. He finished in the top 8 at the National Student Sumo Championships, and in 2016 won the Amateur Yokozuna title, the first from Chuo University to achieve this since Mutetsuyama in 1990.

== Career ==
Because of his amateur achievements, Yago was allowed to enter professional sumo in the third highest makushita division, leap-frogging the lower divisions. He joined Oguruma stable, recruited by the former ōzeki Kotokaze. He made his debut in May 2017 at the rank of makushita tsukedashi 15, and earned a 5–2 record. In his next tournament he won the makushita divisional championship or yūshō with a perfect 7–0 record, which guaranteed him promotion to the second highest jūryō division and elite sekitori status. Two losing records of seven wins against eight losses saw him drop back down to makushita in January 2018, but he made an immediate return to jūryō with a 5–2 score. He progressed steadily up the jūryō division in 2018, recording four consecutive winning records, and entered the top makuuchi division in January 2019. He scored nine wins against six losses in his top division debut, which saw him promoted to his highest rank to date of maegashira 10 for the March 2019 tournament. However, three straight losing records saw him demoted to jūryō for the September 2019 tournament. He managed an 8–7 record in September, but then three straight scores of only four wins against eleven losses saw him demoted to the makushita division for the (cancelled) Natsu tournament in May 2020. Following the cancellation, he had surgery on his knees. He returned to jūryō for the January 2021 tournament, scoring eight wins and seven losses, but he was only able to obtain four wins in the March tournament and was demoted to makushita for the May 2021 tournament. A 4–3 record in May was enough to return him immediately to jūryō.

After being demoted to makushita again in 2022 and suffering an injury that forced him to miss three tournaments in 2024, Yago found himself competing in the jonidan and sandanme divisions in 2026. Struggling to regain his former status, Yago was ultimately forced to end his career during the September tournament, after posting a losing record on the twelfth day of the tournament. In a press release, Yago explained that despite his efforts, his determination to regain his former rank was hampered by a knee injury, leading him to decide to end his career. After careful consideration, he also stated his intention to join the coaching staff at the Chuo University sumo club.

== Fighting style ==
Yago is a yotsu-sumo wrestler, who prefers fighting on the mawashi to pushing or thrusting at his opponents. His favourite grip is hidari-yotsu, a right hand outside and left hand inside position. His most common winning kimarite is a straightforward yori-kiri or force out.

== Career record ==
Yago Takanori
Year	January Hatsu basho, Tokyo	March Haru basho, Osaka	May Natsu basho, Tokyo	July Nagoya basho, Nagoya	September Aki basho, Tokyo	November Kyūshū basho, Fukuoka
2017	x	x	Makushita tsukedashi #15; 5–2	East Makushita #11; 7–0; Champion	West Jūryō #13; 7–8	West Jūryō #14; 7–8
2018	East Makushita #1; 5–2	East Jūryō #11; 7–8	East Jūryō #12; 9–6	West Jūryō #8; 10–5	West Jūryō #2; 8–7	East Jūryō #1; 10–5
2019	East Maegashira #13; 9–6	West Maegashira #10; 6–9	West Maegashira #12; 6–9	East Maegashira #15; 4–11	East Jūryō #4; 8–7	West Jūryō #2; 4–11
2020	West Jūryō #7; 4–11	East Jūryō #10; 4–11	West Makushita #1; Tournament Cancelled; State of Emergency; 0–0–0	West Makushita #1; 3–5	East Makushita #8; 6–1	East Makushita #2; 4–3
2021	West Jūryō #13; 8–7	West Jūryō #10; 4–11	West Makushita #1; 4–3	West Jūryō #14; 9–6	East Jūryō #10; 7–8	East Jūryō #10; 5–10
2022	West Jūryō #14; 11–4	East Jūryō #8; 8–7	West Jūryō #7; 4–11	West Jūryō #12; 4–11	West Makushita #2; 1–6	West Makushita #14; 4–3
2023	East Makushita #11; 4–3	West Makushita #8; 2–5	West Makushita #17; 4–3	East Makushita #13; 3–4	East Makushita #19; 5–2	East Makushita #9; 4–3
2024	East Makushita #6; 2–5	East Makushita #20; 5–2	East Makushita #12; 3–4	East Makushita #16; Sat out due to injury 0–0–7	East Makushita #59; Sat out due to injury 0–0–7	West Sandanme #39; Sat out due to injury 0–0–7
2025	West Jonidan #19; 7–0; Champion	West Sandanme #12; 5–2	West Makushita #51; 4–3	West Makushita #40; 6–1	West Makushita #16; 3–4	East Makushita #22; 3–4
2026	East Makushita #28; 3–4	East Makushita #38; 4–3	East Makushita #29; 1–6	East Makushita #53; 1–6	West Sandanme #22; Retired; 3–4	x
Record given as wins–losses–absences Top division champion Top division runner-up Retired Lower divisions Non-participation Sanshō key: F=Fighting spirit; O=Outstanding performance; T=Technique Also shown: ★=Kinboshi; P=Playoff(s); Divisions: Makuuchi — Jūryō — Makushita — Sandanme — Jonidan — Jonokuchi Makuuchi ranks: Yokozuna — Ōzeki — Sekiwake — Komusubi — Maegashira

== See also ==
- List of past sumo wrestlers
