= Enazakura Tooru =

Sumo wrestler

Personal information
- Native name: 恵那櫻 徹
- Born: Toru Hayakawa; 29 July 1960 (age 66) Sakashita, Gifu, Japan
- Height: 1.81 m (5 ft 11 1/2 in)
- Weight: 135 kg (298 lb)

Sport
- Sport: Sumo
- Retired: July, 1994
- Heya: Oshiogawa
- Record: 555-565-0
- Debut: March, 1977
- Highest rank: Maegashira 1 (November 1990)
- Elder name: See retirement
- Championships: 1 (Jūryō)
- Special Prizes: Fighting Spirit (1)
- Updated on June 25, 2020

Enazakura Tooru (born 29 July 1960 as Toru Hayakawa) is a former sumo wrestler from Sakashita, Gifu, Japan. He made his professional debut in March 1977 and reached the top division in November 1987. His highest rank was maegashira 1. Upon retirement from active competition in 1994 he became an elder in the Japan Sumo Association, leaving in July 1999.

== Career ==
He was recruited by the former ozeki Daikirin and joined Oshiogawa stable in March 1977 at the age of 16. He began fighting under his own surname of Hayakawa, receiving the shikona of Enazakura (meaning ″the cherry blossoms of Ena″, a region in his native Gifu Prefecture) in 1980. He was not particularly large, at around 180 cm and 120 kg, so it took him nine years of toil in the lower divisions before he became an elite sekitori ranked wrestler in March 1986. He won promotion to the top makuuchi division in November 1987, alongside Kotoinazuma and Nankairyu, and all three came thorough with kachi-koshi or winning records. In July 1989 he earned what was to be his only sansho or special prize, for Fighting Spirit after a fine 10–5 score. He never reached the sanyaku ranks, peaking at maegashira 1 which he reached in November 1990 at the age of 30. He was unable to defeat a yokozuna in his career, but won both of his two matches against ōzeki Konishiki.

Enazakura enjoyed cooking and listening to traditional Japanese music, and was an enka singer himself.

== Retirement ==
Enazakura′s last appearance in the top division was in March 1993, and he was demoted from the second juryo division a year later. He retired in July 1994 after two losing scores in the unsalaried makushita division. He remained in a sumo as a coach at Oshiogwawa stable, under the elder name Shikoroyama which was owned by the former komusubi Wakabayama. He switched to the Takenawa elder name in 1995, but when this was needed by the retiring Tochinowaka in July 1999, Enazakura had to leave the sumo world. He received a 2 million yen retirement payoff. Afterwards he ran a sumo-themed chanko restaurant.

== Fighting style ==
Enazakura was a solid if unspectacular wrestler who favoured pushing and thrusting techniques to fighting on the mawashi or belt. He regularly used oshi dashi (push out), tsuki otoshi (thrust over), hataki komi (slap down), hiki otoshi (pull down) and yori kiri (force out). He rarely employed throwing moves, occasionally using sukuinage (scoop throw).

== Career record ==
Enazakura Tooru
Year	January Hatsu basho, Tokyo	March Haru basho, Osaka	May Natsu basho, Tokyo	July Nagoya basho, Nagoya	September Aki basho, Tokyo	November Kyūshū basho, Fukuoka
1977	x	(Maezumo)	East Jonokuchi #8; 4–3	West Jonidan #79; 5–2	West Jonidan #45; 3–4	West Jonidan #53; 2–5
1978	West Jonidan #78; 6–1	West Jonidan #16; 2–5	West Jonidan #40; 5–2	East Jonidan #5; 3–4	East Jonidan #21; 3–4	West Jonidan #28; 5–2
1979	East Sandanme #89; 4–3	West Sandanme #72; 1–6	East Jonidan #11; 5–2	West Sandanme #68; 3–4	East Sandanme #83; 5–2	East Sandanme #54; 4–3
1980	East Sandanme #42; 3–4	East Sandanme #55; 3–4	West Sandanme #68; 5–2	East Sandanme #38; 4–3	West Sandanme #22; 4–3	East Sandanme #5; 4–3
1981	West Makushita #50; 4–3	West Makushita #35; 2–5	West Makushita #50; 4–3	West Makushita #38; 4–3	West Makushita #30; 3–4	West Makushita #37; 2–5
1982	East Sandanme #2; 4–3	West Makushita #51; 2–5	West Makushita #14; 5–2	West Makushita #48; 5–2	West Makushita #27; 2–5	West Makushita #45; 5–2
1983	East Makushita #30; 4–3	East Makushita #26; 5–2	West Makushita #50; 4–3	West Makushita #40; 6–1	East Makushita #15; 3–4	East Makushita #23; 4–3
1984	East Makushita #15; 3–4	East Makushita #24; 4–3	West Makushita #15; 3–4	West Makushita #21; 5–2	West Makushita #11; 4–3	West Makushita #8; 2–5
1985	East Makushita #26; 3–4	East Makushita #36; 4–3	East Makushita #25; 4–3	East Makushita #17; 4–3	West Makushita #12; 4–3	East Makushita #10; 5–2
1986	East Makushita #3; 5–2	West Jūryō #13; 10–5	East Jūryō #7; 8–7	West Jūryō #4; 5–10	East Jūryō #9; 10–5	West Jūryō #5; 9–6
1987	West Jūryō #3; 5–10	West Jūryō #9; 8–7	East Jūryō #6; 9–6	East Jūryō #3; 8–7	East Jūryō #2; 9–6	East Maegashira #13; 9–6
1988	East Maegashira #8; 8–7	East Maegashira #3; 4–11	West Maegashira #11; 8–7	East Maegashira #8; 8–7	West Maegashira #3; 3–12	East Maegashira #12; 8–7
1989	East Maegashira #8; 6–9	East Maegashira #11; 7–8	West Maegashira #12; 10–5; F	West Maegashira #5; 6–9	West Maegashira #7; 6–9	East Maegashira #13; 9–6
1990	West Maegashira #5; 6–9	East Maegashira #11; 8–7	West Maegashira #5; 6–9	West Maegashira #10; 8–7	West Maegashira #7; 8–7	West Maegashira #1; 3–12
1991	East Maegashira #12; 10–5	West Maegashira #4; 4–11	East Maegashira #14; 10–5	East Maegashira #6; 3–12	West Maegashira #14; 7–8	East Jūryō #1; 4–11
1992	East Jūryō #10; 8–7	East Jūryō #8; 11–4; Champion	East Jūryō #1; 9–6	West Maegashira #13; 4–11	West Jūryō #4; 5–10	East Jūryō #10; 10–5
1993	West Jūryō #5; 10–5	West Maegashira #15; 6–9	East Jūryō #4; 9–6	West Jūryō #2; 8–7	East Jūryō #2; 6–9	East Jūryō #6; 6–9
1994	East Jūryō #10; 7–8	East Jūryō #11; 3–12	West Makushita #10; 2–5	West Makushita #27; Retired; 3–4	x	x
Record given as wins–losses–absences Top division champion Top division runner-up Retired Lower divisions Non-participation Sanshō key: F=Fighting spirit; O=Outstanding performance; T=Technique Also shown: ★=Kinboshi; P=Playoff(s); Divisions: Makuuchi — Jūryō — Makushita — Sandanme — Jonidan — Jonokuchi Makuuchi ranks: Yokozuna — Ōzeki — Sekiwake — Komusubi — Maegashira

== See also ==
- Glossary of sumo terms
- List of past sumo wrestlers
- List of sumo tournament second division champions
