= Daikirin Takayoshi =

Sumo wrestler (1942–2010)

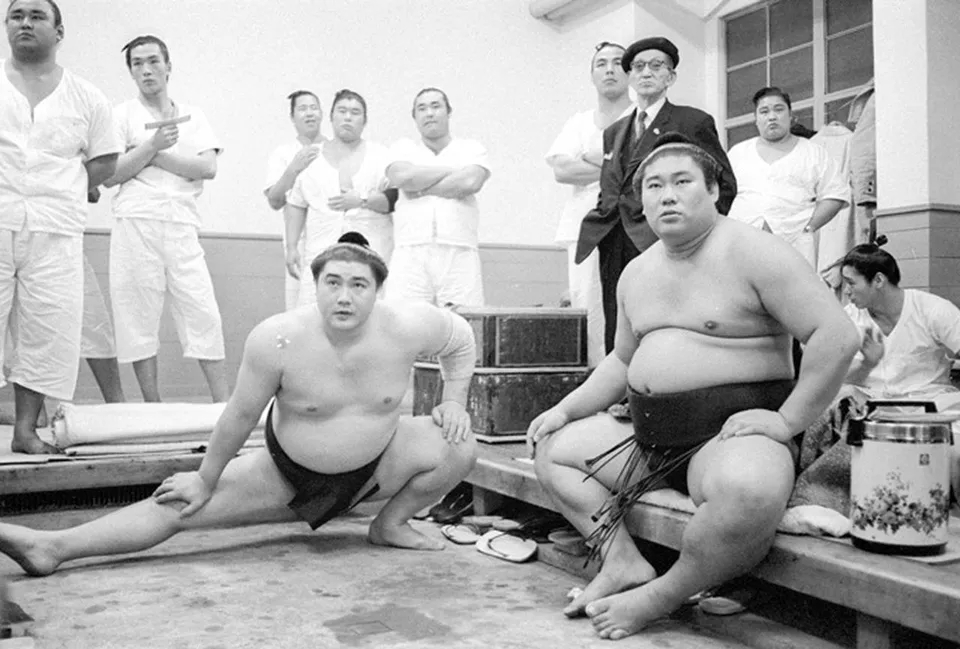
- Daikirin (front right) and his stablemate Taihō (c. 1970)

Personal information
- Native name: 大麒麟 將能
- Born: Masakatsu Tsutsumi; 20 June 1942 Saga, Japan
- Died: 4 August 2010 (aged 68)
- Height: 1.82 m (5 ft 11 1/2 in)
- Weight: 140 kg (309 lb)

Sport
- Sport: Sumo
- Retired: November 1974
- Heya: Nishonoseki
- Record: 710–507–69
- Debut: May 1958
- Highest rank: Ōzeki (November 1970)
- Elder name: Oshiogawa
- Championships: 1 (Jūryō); 1 (Sandanme)
- Special Prizes: Technique (4); Outstanding Performance (5)
- Gold Stars: 3 Kashiwado (2); Sadanoyama
- Updated on June 2020

Daikirin Takayoshi (大麒麟 將能) (20 June 1942 – 4 August 2010), born Masakatsu Tsutsumi, was a sumo wrestler from Saga Prefecture, Japan. He began his professional career in 1958 and reached his highest rank of ōzeki twelve years later in 1970. He retired in 1974, and until June 2006 he was an elder of the Sumo Association under the name Oshiogawa.

== Career ==
Born in Morodome in the city of Saga, he joined Nishonoseki stable and made his professional debut in May 1958. He initially fought under his own surname of Tsutsumi. After four years in the lower ranks he reached sekitori status in May 1962 upon promotion to the jūryō division, and changed his shikona to Kirinji. He did not make an immediate impact but in May 1963 took the jūryō yūshō or championship with a 13–2 score which pushed him up to jūryō 1. A 10–5 record in the next tournament saw him enter the top makuuchi division for the first time but he had to pull out halfway into his debut tournament and returned to the second division.

After suffering some more injury problems he finally won promotion back to makuuchi in July 1965. He slowly climbed up the maegashira ranks before earning three kinboshi in successive tournaments from May to September 1966, defeating yokozuna Kashiwado twice, and then Sadanoyama. (He did not have to face the most successful yokozuna, Taihō, because they were members of the same stable). His 11–4 score in the September tournament saw him promoted to sekiwake. He remained in the san'yaku ranks for the next seven tournaments, earning several awards, before dropping back briefly to the maegashira ranks. In March 1968 at komusubi rank he defeated Sadanoyama, the winner of the previous two tournaments, in what was to be the yokozuna's last ever bout. Kirinji went on to finish runner-up, his final day defeat handing the yūshō to maegashira Wakanami, who did not face any yokozuna or ōzeki during the tournament.

Kirinji remained comfortably within the san'yaku ranks for the next two years, but with mainly 8–7 and 9–6 scores he was not a candidate for ōzeki promotion. He was runner-up for the second time (to Kitanofuji) in November 1969, and in the July and September tournaments of 1970 he finally managed to put together two strong performances in a row, scoring 12–3 each time, and was promoted to ōzeki at the age of 28. To mark the occasion he adopted a new shikona, Daikirin.

Daikirin remained as an ōzeki for 25 tournaments over four years. He was unable to win a championship, although he was a runner-up twice more, to Tamanoumi in July 1971 and Wajima in May 1972. However he was also kadoban (in danger of relegation) a number of times. In November 1974, having barely maintained his rank with an 8–7 record in the previous tournament, he retired from sumo on the fourth day at the age of 32.

== Retirement from sumo ==
He remained in the sumo world as an elder under the name Oshiogawa. In 1975, upon the death of his old stablemaster (former ōzeki Sagonohana), he expected to inherit Nishonoseki stable, but could not come to agreement with Saganohana's widow. After former sekiwake Kongō's engagement to Saganohana's daughter was announced, Oshiogawa realised he now had no chance of taking over so instead he broke away and established his own Oshiogawa stable. He attempted to take a number of high-ranking wrestlers with him, such as Aobajō and Tenryū, but Nishonoseki stable objected to this. The Japan Sumo Association intervened and Tenryū was forced to return to Nishonoseki and, disillusioned, quit to become a professional wrestler. Meanwhile, in addition to Aobajō, Oshiogawa produced a number of other sekitori such as Masurao, Enazakura, Daishi, Wakatoba and Wakakirin. In March 2005, with Oshiogawa approaching the mandatory retirement age and no obvious successor available, his stable was absorbed into the affiliated Oguruma stable. Oshiogawa retired from his position in the Sumo Association a year before reaching the mandatory retirement age, in June 2006.

He died of pancreatic cancer in August 2010 at the age of 68.

== Career record ==
Daikirin Takayoshi
Year	January Hatsu basho, Tokyo	March Haru basho, Osaka	May Natsu basho, Tokyo	July Nagoya basho, Nagoya	September Aki basho, Tokyo	November Kyūshū basho, Fukuoka
1958	x	x	(Maezumo)	West Jonokuchi #8; 5–3	West Jonidan #99; 6–2	West Jonidan #57; 4–4
1959	East Jonidan #57; 4–4	West Jonidan #47; 5–3	East Jonidan #25; 5–3	East Jonidan #8; 6–2	East Sandanme #88; 4–4	West Sandanme #82; 4–4
1960	East Sandanme #80; 4–4	West Sandanme #70; 5–3	East Sandanme #45; 6–2	East Sandanme #13; 6–1	East Makushita #68; 1–6	East Makushita #81; 2–4–1
1961	East Sandanme #13; 3–4	East Sandanme #22; 3–4	East Sandanme #31; 7–0–P; Champion	East Makushita #51; 4–3	West Makushita #46; 3–4	West Makushita #51; 6–1
1962	West Makushita #22; 6–1	East Makushita #5; 4–3	East Makushita #1; 4–3	East Jūryō #18; 9–6	West Jūryō #12; 7–8	West Jūryō #13; 6–9
1963	East Jūryō #16; 8–7	East Jūryō #14; 8–7	East Jūryō #9; 13–2; Champion	West Jūryō #1; 10–5	East Maegashira #14; 4–5–6	West Jūryō #4; Sat out due to injury 0–0–15
1964	East Jūryō #17; 4–11	West Makushita #5; 6–1	West Jūryō #16; 9–6	West Jūryō #11; 9–6	East Jūryō #6; 4–7–4	East Jūryō #12; 7–8
1965	West Jūryō #13; 10–5	East Jūryō #7; 9–6	East Jūryō #3; 11–4	East Maegashira #14; 8–7	West Maegashira #9; 9–6	West Maegashira #4; 7–8
1966	East Maegashira #5; 6–9	East Maegashira #8; 8–7	East Maegashira #5; 9–6; O★	East Maegashira #3; 6–9 ★	West Maegashira #4; 11–4; T★	West Sekiwake #1; 7–8
1967	West Komusubi #1; 9–6; O	West Sekiwake #1; 7–8	West Komusubi #1; 12–3; TO	East Sekiwake #1; 10–5	West Sekiwake #1; 10–5	East Sekiwake #1; 4–11
1968	East Maegashira #4; 10–5	East Komusubi #1; 12–3; O	West Sekiwake #1; 8–7	West Sekiwake #1; 8–7	West Sekiwake #1; 6–9	West Maegashira #2; 9–6
1969	East Komusubi #1; 8–7	East Komusubi #1; 9–6	East Komusubi #1; 8–7	East Komusubi #1; 8–7	East Komusubi #1; 11–4	East Komusubi #1; 11–4; O
1970	East Sekiwake #1; 8–7	West Sekiwake #1; 8–7	West Sekiwake #1; 9–6	West Sekiwake #1; 12–3; T	East Sekiwake #1; 12–3; T	East Ōzeki #1; 9–6
1971	West Ōzeki #1; 11–4	East Ōzeki #1; 10–5	West Ōzeki #1; 10–5	West Ōzeki #1; 11–4	East Ōzeki #1; 10–5	East Ōzeki #1; 9–6
1972	East Ōzeki #1; Sat out due to injury 0–0–15	West Ōzeki #2; 10–5	West Ōzeki #2; 11–4	East Ōzeki #1; 2–2–11	West Ōzeki #2; 8–7	West Ōzeki #3; 10–5
1973	West Ōzeki #2; 9–6	West Ōzeki #1; 3–12	East Ōzeki #2; 9–6	West Ōzeki #1; 9–6	West Ōzeki #1; 3–6–6	East Ōzeki #2; 8–7
1974	East Ōzeki #2; 9–6	West Ōzeki #2; 9–6	East Ōzeki #2; 10–5	West Ōzeki #1; 0–4–11	West Ōzeki #1; 8–7	West Ōzeki #1; Retired; 1–3
Record given as wins–losses–absences Top division champion Top division runner-up Retired Lower divisions Non-participation Sanshō key: F=Fighting spirit; O=Outstanding performance; T=Technique Also shown: ★=Kinboshi; P=Playoff(s); Divisions: Makuuchi — Jūryō — Makushita — Sandanme — Jonidan — Jonokuchi Makuuchi ranks: Yokozuna — Ōzeki — Sekiwake — Komusubi — Maegashira

== See also ==
- Glossary of sumo terms
- List of sumo tournament top division runners-up
- List of sumo tournament second division champions
- List of past sumo wrestlers
- List of ōzeki
