= Lakia =

Toponym of the ethnic territory of the Laks in Dagestan

The map showing the territory of Lakia in bright red in the mountainous southern Dagestan

Lakia (Lak: Lak, Lakral kanu, or Lakkuy) is the later name for the ethnic territory of the Laks, located in the central part of mountainous Dagestan. Historically, this region was known as Gumik or Tuman. It was also informally known as Lakistan. The town of Kumukh serves as the main historical, cultural, spiritual, and political center of Lakia, which encompasses the Lakskiy and Kulinskiy districts.

== Territory ==
=== Geographical location ===
Lakia is bordered to the north and west by Avaria, to the east by Dargo (also occasionally referred to as Darginstan or Darganstan), and to the south by Agul and Rutul. Beyond the Caucasus lie Georgia and Azerbaijan, including the historical kingdom of the Tsakhurs.

Lakia is shaped like a triangle with slightly rounded sides, its apex pointing north and the base to the south. The apex is marked by the gorge of Tsudakhar, while the sides of the triangle are defined by the cross-ridges of the Caucasian Mountains. The eastern side includes the Karinsko-Kundi Mountains, Ali Mountain, Shunudag, and the Kulinsko-Khosrekh Ridge, whereas the western side features the Turchidag, Shali Ridge, and the Archavarsky Ridge. The base of the triangle is formed by Dultidag and the Kukminski Mountains.

Russian general and historian A. V. Komarov (1869) wrote:

The country of the Lak people consists of many canyons that converge into one about three miles (5 km) below the main village of Gumuk. It is separated from the Samur Valley by a high ridge parallel to the Greater Caucasus Mountain Range, whose many peaks are covered with eternal snow. Passage through these peaks is possible only during the summer months. Similar ridges, though slightly lower, separate the Lak people from their neighbors—the Kurins, Dargins, and Avars.

=== Settlements ===
In the Laksky and Kulinsky Districts, there are about 90 Lak villages, most of which are located within the triangular region that encompasses the basin of the Kazikumukh Koisu and its tributary, the Kulinka River. This basin is intersected by various tributaries of the major rivers, with mountains and smaller ridges rising above them. The rivers often occupy the entire bottom of the valleys, with steep slopes towering above, leaving only narrow footpaths for passage. Between the mountain ranges lie alpine plateaus, with an average elevation of 1,400–2,000 meters. Lakia has very few forests, likely because they were cleared to expand grazing land for livestock.

== History ==
=== Antiquity ===
The Laks have lived in the mountains of Dagestan for centuries. According to M. Kurbiev, a fortress was built in Kumukh in the 4th century by a Lak king. Traces of this ancient fortress can still be seen among the ruins: "These are remnants of stone fortress walls, three meters thick, over which a cart could pass freely, and the remains of three massive, circular towers at the northern part of the settlement." The state of the Laks, or the Lak state (as referred to in the Lak language), is believed to be one of the oldest in Dagestan.

Armenian historian Vardapet Yeghishe reported that, in the 5th century, 11 kings of the mountains waged war against Sassanian Iran. Historical records indicate that the Sassanian conquerors sought to subjugate existing political power centers, one of which was Kumukh in mountainous Dagestan, a region of political importance to the Sassanids. Chronicles state that Persian ruler Khosrow I Anushirvan captured Kumukh, "appointed [there] a ruler," and noted that "the rulers of Kumukh were from the family of Nushirwan."

By the 6th century, the ruling dynasty of Kumukh was related to the royal family of Anushirvan. During the 6th and 7th centuries, the Persian rulers allied with the rulers of mountainous Dagestan against the Khazars. V. V. Bartold wrote that the Sassanids fortified not only the Derbent passage but also neighboring mountainous valleys. Additionally, the rulers of the mountains were integrated into the Persian nobility and received titles and ranks from the Sassanids.

=== Middle Ages ===
An important milestone in the history of the Laks was the arrival of the Arabs in Dagestan. Following prolonged Arab invasions in the 8th century, Lakia came under the rule of a Shamkhal, an appointee of the Arabs. Kumukh became one of the centers of Arab influence in Dagestan, and in 778, a cathedral mosque was constructed there. Bahadur Gamzatovich Malachihanov wrote, "Kumukh was the largest stage in the great ancient pass of the people. As such, drawing attention to itself, it must have been, from a very early period of Arab conquests in the Caucasus, the subject of fierce Islamic expansion directed to the north."

In 1240, Kumukh was invaded by the Mongolo-Tatars. By the end of the 13th century, the rulers of Kumukh had embraced Islam. In the 14th century, the state of Shamkhal emerged as the leading political and military power in Dagestan.

In the 15th century, with the decline of the Golden Horde's influence in the North Caucasus, the Shamkhal of Gazi-Kumukh asserted his authority in northern Dagestan and resisted territorial expansion by Iran, Shirvan, and Georgia. By the 16th century, the ruler of Gazi-Kumukh was granted the Iranian title Padishah. In the 17th century, an anti-Shamkhalate coalition, which included Iran, Russia, and Turkey, sought to reduce the authority of the ruler of Gazi-Kumukh. In 1642, the title of Shamkhal was transferred from Gazi-Kumukh to a branch of Shamkhals in Tarki.

=== Modern era ===
Alibek II established the Gazikumukh Khanate, and Lakia was divided into six districts or principalities: "Machimi," "Vitskhi," "Gumuchi," "Kullal," "Uri-Mukarki," and "Bartki." The "qat" of Gazi-Kumukh held authority over the region. In 1710, Surkhay Khan I unified Lakia into a single state and formed a regular army. By 1725, Surkhay Khan I had become the ruler of Shirvan. In 1820, Lakia became part of Russia.

== Rulers ==
=== Shamkhals ===
Shakhbal ibn Abdullah (740), Badr I (1295–1304), Akhsuvar I (14th century), Surkhay I (16th century), Umal-Muhammad I (1551), Budai I ibn Umal-Muhammad (1566–1567), Surkhay I ibn Umal-Muhammad (1567–1569), Chopan ibn Budai (1569–157?), Surkhay II ibn Chopan (1605–1614), Andia ibn Chopan (1614–1623), Eldar ibn Surkhay (1623–1635), Aidemir ibn Sultan Mahmud (1635–1640).

=== Khans ===
Alibek II ibn Tuchilav (1642–1700), Surkhay ibn Garai-Bek (1700–1741), Murtazali ibn Surkhay (1741–1743), Muhammad ibn Surkhay (1743–1789), Surkhay ibn Muhammad (1789–1820), Aslan ibn Shakhmardan (1820–1836), Nutsal-Aga ibn Aslan (1836), Muhammad-Mirza ibn Aslan (1836–1838), Ummu Kulsum-Beke (1838–1841), Abdurrahman ibn Umar (1841–1847), Aglar ibn Umar (1847–1859), Jafar ibn Aglar (1877).

== Secular education ==
=== Schools ===
In 1861, a secular school was opened in Kumukh, offering instruction in the Russian language and basic arithmetic. In October 1912, two male rural schools were established in Unchukatl and Kaya, with 27 and 50 students, respectively. A year later, one-class male schools were opened in Tsovkra and Kurkli. The school in Kumukh was transformed into a higher primary school. One of the most prominent figures in the educational development of Dagestan in the early 19th century was Sayed Gabiev of Kumukh, who later became one of the leaders of Dagestan. Madrasa schools developed alongside secular schools, and by 1913, there were about 40 of them in the Gazi-Kumukh District.

In 1967, a children's music school was established in Kumukh, with its first director, Zinaida Abakarova, a graduate of Makhachkala Music College. The school offered instruction in piano and folk instruments. In 1990, a choreography department was added to the school, which operated for six years. In 1996, the school was renamed in honor of the prominent Lak singer Maryam Dandamaeva. In 2003, the music school was reorganized into the School of Arts, which introduced jewelry and choreography departments. The Kumukh choreographic ensemble, "Ozornie Devchata," represented the district in television shows such as "Rainbow-Bow," "Stars of Dagestan," "Quail," and the annual "Shamil Sabre" contest, where it consistently secured first place. In 2006, the ensemble won the award at the "Schunudag" festival and received a third-degree diploma at the national competition "My Home — Native Dagestan." In 2008, at the 5th International Competition of Young Performers in Sochi, the ensemble earned second place.

=== Native language ===
Literary language began to take shape among the Laks as early as the 15th century. In the early 18th century, several works were translated from Persian and Arabic into Lak, including the historical chronicle Derbent-Nameh and the medical treatise Hannal Murad (Khan's Desire). The education of children in Lak literacy in Kumukh was made possible through the tireless efforts of P. K. Uslar, who compiled the Lak alphabet, which was published in 1865. The first lecturer of the Lak language was Abdullah Omar, a student and friend of P. K. Uslar, and a native of the village of Kurkli. Uslar wrote that A. Omar "is a young man, very talented and hardworking, with whom I could freely communicate in Russian. Now he writes in his own language without the slightest difficulty and has learned the grammatical structure of it. On him rests the hope for the distribution of literature among the Laks."

Under Soviet rule, the Lak language was granted literary status and assigned the functions of teaching and learning. It successfully served as the language of instruction in elementary and high schools, as well as colleges and universities. Textbooks in Lak were written by figures such as G.-G. Gitinaev, Ali al-Ghumuqi, and G.B. Murkelinski (who later became the first Doctor of Philology and Sciences in the North Caucasus). Haroun Saidov, a post-revolutionary writer born in Vachi village in 1891 and shot by Denikin's bandits in Kumukh in 1919, founded the Lak newspaper Ilchi. He was also the author of several poetry and prose pieces, including the first social drama in the Lak language, Kalaychital. His works include the collection of poems The Sounds of Lak Chungury (1927) and the novel The People. Lak poets of the post-October period (1917) included Ahmed Karadi, Zak-Zade (Kurdi), Khalil Ibrahim, Eid Aliyev, Abakar Mudunov, and Magomed Bashaev. Gadis Hajiyev and Mueddin (Murad) Charin translated works by Pushkin, Lermontov, Heine, Shakespeare, and others into Lak.

== Culture ==
=== Craft ===
The culture of the Laks is rich in folklore and handicrafts, with traditions that trace back to ancient times, as well as modern practices. Archaeological evidence suggests that metalworking has been present in Kumukh and the surrounding areas since the mid-1st millennium BC.

The art of working with precious metals was practiced by many peoples of the Caucasus, and the Laks were no exception. For instance, in the Gazikumukh district, 55 out of 100 villages engaged in the processing of gold and silver. Many Lak towns, such as Kumukh, Hurukra, Unchukatl, Kai Kurkli, Nitsovkra, Duchi, Chitur, Churtah, and Chara, were known as jewelry centers. Researchers distinguished Kumukh (Gazi-Kumukh) for its elegant examples of craftsmanship and high skill in decorating various products with silver, gold, ivory, and enamel. Lak gunsmiths were considered among the best in the Caucasus, with famous families such as Chargada (17th–18th century), Akiyev (18th century), Guzunov (17th–19th and early 20th century), and Malla-Umarov (17th–20th century). In 1886, the Gazi-Kumukh county had 608 master silversmiths and 276 blacksmiths.

=== Theater ===
The Lak State Music and Drama Theatre, named after E. Kapiev, operates in Dagestan and traces its origins to the amateur circle of Lak intellectuals in Kumukh, which was established in 1914. In 1920, the theater was renamed the Soviet Theater of Said Gabiev. In early 1935, by the decision of the Provincial Committee of the CPSU (B) and the CPC of the Dagestan ASSR, the Lak Drama Theatre of E. Kapiev was officially opened. The founders of the theater included I. Balugov, A. Dzhalalov, A. Aliev, Gunashev, G. Buganov, H. Sultanov, A. Huseynov, and M. Ramazanov. In 2001, the play "Party-Patima" by M. Aliyev won the Republican State Award in Theatrical Arts of G. Tsadasa (directed by Efendiyev). In 2004, the Ministry of Culture of the Russian Federation and the Ministry of Culture of Dagestan awarded the Lak Theatre the Festival Diploma "Poetic Theater of Dagestan" for its contribution to the genre enrichment of Dagestan's theatrical arts, particularly for staging the musical The Wheel of Life. Popular shows in Lakia include the old Lak song "Shaza of Kurkli", amateur art dedicated to "Part-Patima", and the Shunudag festival. These activities are recorded on video and shown on the local television channel "Lakia" and sometimes on Dagestani television.

=== Monuments ===
The Krinski and Vareyski rock paintings, ruins of ancient settlements, and old stone buildings are notable historical landmarks in the Lak district. In total, the district has 114 monuments of history, culture, and architecture. Among them, 40 are architectural monuments and one is a monumental art piece. In Kumukh, there is an ancient underground water conveyance system, the shamkhal and Yemeni cemeteries, and the tombstone stele of Murtazali-Khan. In the village of Chukna, there is the old house of Suleyman Chupalov, who, at the beginning of the 19th century, was the chief judge of Dagestan and met with Tsar Nicholas II in Derbent, as well as the house of the poet Shazy Kurklinskaya from Kurkli village. Among the fortresses in the capital of Lakia, the bastion built on a hill in Kumukh, named Gurd (Gurd-bakIu), is particularly notable. This bastion was home to the rulers of Kazi-Kumukh. The name "Gurd" is also the origin of the name for the ancient Lak weapon, "Gurda-tur."

=== Celebrations ===
In 2002, Lak District celebrated its 80th anniversary. The celebration was attended by Mukhtar Majidov, First Deputy Prime Minister of Dagestan, pilot-cosmonaut and Hero of the Soviet Union Musa Manarov, State Duma deputy, Ilyasov Sirazhudinov, Chairman of NBRD Bank of Russia, as well as heads of administrations from cities and districts of Dagestan. Famous singers of Lak songs were also invited. A delegation from Agul District, headed by Yuri Ismailov, came to offer congratulations. The Head of the MO "Lak District," Yusup Magomedov, stated, "Lakia is a unique formation in the central part of mountainous Dagestan." The book Lakia by Musanip Uvaysov was presented at the National Library named after R. Gamzatov. The presentation was attended by intellectuals, scholars, and prominent figures from Dagestan's culture, art, science, and education.

== See also ==
- History of Lakia
- Shamkhalate of Kazi-Kumukh
- Khanate of Kazi-Kumukh
- Dagestan
- History of Dagestan
