= Gazikumukh Shamkhalate =

Term denoting the Kumyk-Lak state

"Gazikumukh Shamkhalate" is a term introduced in Russian-Dagestan historiography starting from the 1950s–60s to denote the Kumyk state that existed on the territory of present-day Dagestan in the period of the 8th to 17th centuries with the capital in Gazi-Kumukh, and allegedly disintegrated in 1642. However, In the 16th century's Russian archival sources Tarki is stated to be the "capital of Shamkhalate" and "the city of Shamkhal", while "Kazi-Kumuk" is mentioned as a residence. These facts contradict "1642 disintegration" date. Moreover, there is absolutely no source before the 1950s containing the term "Gazikumukh Shamkhalate" or a statement that Gazi-Kumukh had ever been the capital of Shamkhalate. Historically, Shamkhalate is widely described as Tarki Shamkhalate or just Shamkhalate.

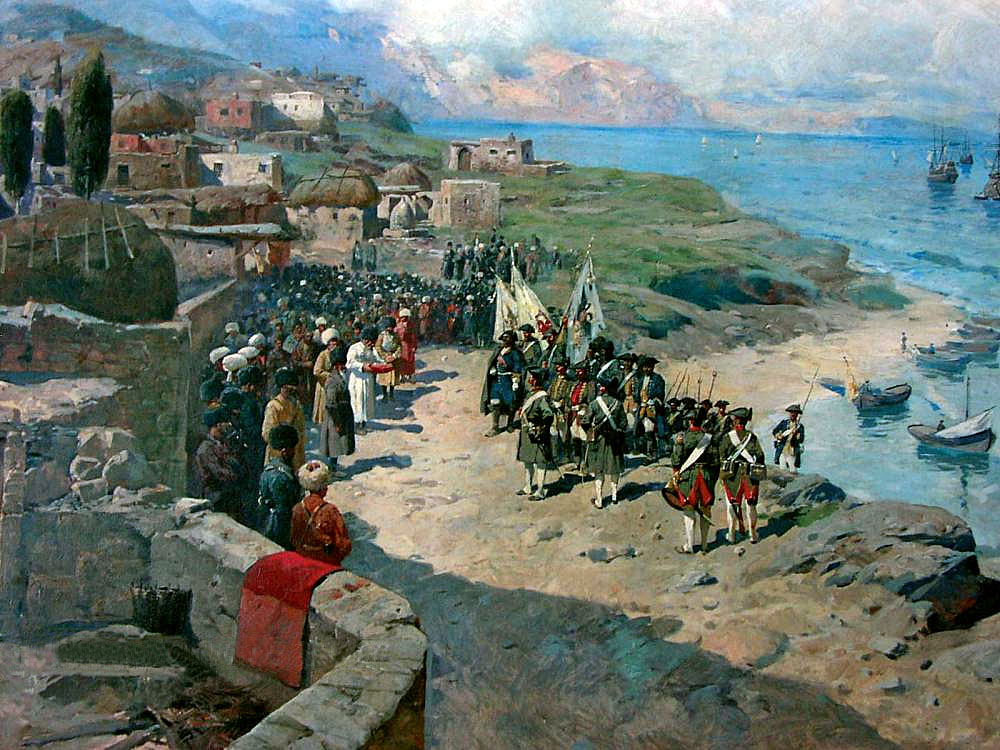
The city of Tarki in the 19th century

== Formation of shamkhalate in the 8th to 12th centuries ==
=== Turkic-Tatar version ===
Among the supporters of Turkic version of the creation of the Shamkhalian state is Lak historian Ali al-Ghumuqi:

Shamkhal wasn't a descendant of Abbas Hamza but a Turk, who came with his companions. After him the Shamkhalate became a hereditary state.

Also it was supported by the historian Fahrettin Kirzioglu, the early 20th century historian D. H. Mamaev, Halim Gerey Sultan, Mehmet-Efendi, and others. Dagestanian historian R. Magomedov stated that:

there is all necessary proofs to relate the term to the Golden Horde, but not to the Arabs. We may think that in the period of the Mongol-Tatars they put a Kumyk ruler in that status [Shamkhal].

Russian professor of oriental studies, the Doctor of Historical Sciences I. Zaytsev, also shared the opinion that the Shamkhalate was a Kumyk state with the capital in the town of Kumuk (written thus in medieval sources). While studying works of the Timurid historians Nizam al-Din Shami and Sharaf al-Din Ali Yazdi, Soviet historians V. Romaskevich and S. Volin, and Uzbek historian Ashraf Ahmedov, as well as professor in Alan studies O. Bubenok, call Gazi-Kumuk (also Gazi-Kumukluk in medieval sources) call the Shamkhalate area as the lands of Kumyks.

Ottoman traveler Evliya Çelebi called the Shamkhal "a natural Oghuz". One of the arguments of the Turkic version is that Shamkhals were elected in the way that is traditional for Turkic peoples — tossing a red apple. Ancient pre-Muslim names of the Kumuk [today Kumukh] inhabitants, as fixed in Khuduk inscription — Budulay, Ahsuwar, Chupan and others — are of Turkic origin. On the graves of the Shamkhals in Kumukh there are Turkic inscriptions, as noted by professor of Caucasian studies L. Lavrov. The grave itself was called by the locals "Semerdalian" after the Khazar city of Semender; the gravestones there are patterned in a Kipchak style. In the "Maza chronicle" Shamkhals are described as "a branch of the Khan-Hakhan generations". Nizam al-Din Shami in his 14th century Timurid chronicle The Book of Triumph and Sheref ad-din Yezdi mentioned the land as Gazi-Kumukluk, where the suffix "luk" suffi is a Turkic linguistic sign.

The ruler of Andi people Ali-Beg, who founded a new ruling dynasty, also had a title of "Shamkhal". According to the local story, starting from Ali-Beg until Khadjik, the rulers of their land spoke in the "language of the plains", i.e. Kumyk.

Jamalutdin-haji Mamaev in the beginning of the 20th century wrote:

The fact that the ruler in Dagestan was chosen from the Chinghiz dynasty and called shawkhal-khan [sic], derived from the Turkic, Tatar spiritual tradition, as a reliance on their genealogical ancestry (nasab), not paying attention to the science or courtesies (edeb). The house of Chinghiz is highly esteemed amongst them (shawkhals), as Quraysh amongst Muslims. They didn't allow someone to stand higher than them or lift heads.

According to French historian Chantal Lemercier-Quelquejay, Shamkhalate was dominated by the Turkic Kumyks, and the Lak people hold the honorable title of Gazis (because of the earlier adoption of Islam). Apart from that, the Shamkhalate had a feudal class of Karachi-beks, a title exclusively related to Mongol-Turkic states.

Piano Karpini mentioned from his travels that Khazaria and Lak, even before falling in the hands of the "Western Tatars", belonged to the Cumans.:

The first King of the Western Tatars was Sain. He was strong and mighty. He conquered Russia, Comania, Alania, Lak, Mengiar, Gugia and Khazaria, and before his conquest, they all belonged to Comans.

Vasily Bartold also stated that the Arabic version is a compilation by local historians trying to merge legends with history.

The original population of the "Kazi-Kumykskiy" possession, as wrote F. Somonovich in 1796, were Dagestan Tatars (Kumyks). After the resettlement of some Lezginian peoples from Gilan province of Persia, under the rule of Shamkhal, the population mixed, and the power of Shamkhal decreased, and the new population formed their own Khanate independent of the Shamkhal dynasty:

The people of this province come from Dagestan Tatars, mixed with the Persian settlers; they follow the same [religious] law, and speak [one of the] Lezginian languages.

and

As some Persian sources say, this people settled here under the Abumuselim shah, from the Gilan Province and served under the cleric official kazi, under the rule of Shamkhal. Because of that cleric and the people of Kumukh place, who resettled here from Gilan, or, better said, by the mixture with the indigenous Kumukh people, who originate from Dagestan Tatars, the name Kazikumuk emerged. This clerics were the ancestors of Khamutay [contemporary Khan of Kazikumukh], who following the example of others claimed in their parts independence and in the present times adopted the Khan title.

=== Critics of the Arabic version ===
V. Bartold also stated, that the term "Shamkhal" is a later form of the original form Shawkhal, which is mentioned both in the Russian and Persian (Nizam al-Din Shami and Sharaf al-Din Ali Yazdi) sources. Dagestani historian Shikhsaidov wrote that the version claiming Arab descent was in favor of the dynasty and clerics (the descendants of Muhammad). A. Kandaurov wrote that the Arab version was elaborated by the Shamkhals themselves. Also, the title Shamkhals is not mentioned in the works of the Medieval Arabic historians and geographers.

=== Arabs in Kumukh ===
In the middle of the 7th century the Rashidun Caliphate, in its expansion to the north, engaged in the conquest of Dagestan. At the beginning of the 8th century the Arabs captured Kumukh, a fact that could have obliged Laks to be in alliance with the Arabs against the Khazars. It is known that the Arabs lost power in Dagestan on successful Khazars invasion and Laks then could have been in alliance with the Khazars. Arabs had to reconquer Dagestan.

=== Campaigns of Maslamah and Marwan II ===
In 734 Maslamah ibn Abd al-Malik, the commander of the Arab army, after one of his victories against the Khazars in Dagestan appointed several governors, one of whom was Shakhbal of Kumukh. The authority of Shakhbal could not have been permanent in Kumukh if he was an Arab. It will be correct to assume that Shakhbal was a local ruler of Kumukh who among Laks held the title Shamkhal. He was probably related to the Arabs and his title was distorted in pronunciation. Historians Barthold and Polievktov associated Shakhbal with Shamkhal, both meaning the ruler of Kumukh. Bakikhanov A. K. wrote that in 734: "Abu Muslim advanced to Kumuk ... The main mosque and other buildings built by him in Kumuk still exist today. He left here Shakhbal ibn Abdullah a ruler".

The chronicle Derbent-Nameh gave the following description of the formation of the Dagestani principalities: "Hamri, Kura, Ahti, Rutul, Zeyhur – they are subject to Kumuk ... for the ruler of Derbent [he] ordered to take kharaj from Kaytak, Tabarsaran and Gyubechi ... If against Shakhbal comes any enemy from [the side of] Avar or from the other side, then, when Shakhbal will assemble his troops, let there come to his aid the army of Kaytak with its ruler Hamza and with army of Tabarsaran – Mohammad Masoom and let [them] join the army of Shakhbal". In 734 there were in Dagestan such principalities with their own rulers, as Derbent, Tabasaran, Kaitag, Lak and Avar which remained independent of the Arabs.

Historian Al-Kufi reported that in 738 the Arab commander Marwan ibn Muhammad "moved from Kassak, crossed the river al-Kur and headed for the city called Shaki. From Shaki he went to the land of al-Sarir." In 738 according to Derbent-Nameh, Marwan obliged the rulers of mountainous Dagestan to pay tribute.

Historian Baileys V.M. reported about the campaign of Marwan in Dagestan: "He [Marwan] came to the fortress 'of the throne' killed and captured prisoners. ... He came to Gumik – a fortress where the 'house of possession' was and here the seat of 'the ruler of the throne' was, the ruler left fleeing and arrived at the fortress called Humradzh where the golden throne was. Marwan spent winter and summer near it and then made peace with [Malik] on conditions of [tribute] – a thousand cattle and a hundred thousand Mudd – and then went from there into the land of Tumen."

=== Juma mosque ===
In 778 the Juma mosque of Kumukh was built where there is an ancient inscription: "In 162 AH, they built the sacred mosque for the Almighty Allah". This inscription was read by Arabists such as Anuchin D. (1882), D. B. Bushaev (1894), M. Alikhanov-Avar and E. Kazubski (1902).

=== Collapse of the caliphate ===
In the 9th century the anti-Arab revolt of Babak Khorramdin and later the Anarchy at Samarra led to the disintegration of the Abbasid Caliphate. Muslim rule in the mountainous Dagestan declined. In the 9th to 11th centuries some territories of southern Dagestan as Tabasaran, Kura, Akhti, Rutul and Tsakhur were under the influence of a stronger Shirvan. The Derbent emirate was formed. Kumukh Shamkhalate consisted of one Lakia.

=== Eastern authors ===
Historians report that "in the first half of the 10th century Gumik was dependent upon neighboring Serir". Ahmad ibn Rustah wrote in the 10th century that "the king of Serir has a fortress called Alal and Gumik". Al-Masudi wrote in the 10th century that the residents of Gumik are "Christian and not subject to any king, but have chiefs (raissi) and live in peace with the kingdom of Alans". Vladimir Minorsky wrote that in 1064 "the infidels of Gumik attacked the village of al-Bab, killed many Muslims and looted their property then obliged the survivors with kharaj and returned home".

=== Principalities ===
Oriental sources reported such names of Dagestani principalities as Derbent, Tabasaran, Gumik, Sarir, Lakz, Haidak, Philan, Shandan, Zirihgeran, Tumen, Djidan, Khamzin, Samandar and Balanjar. Oriental authors have not been to Kumukh and did not mention shamkhal (or utsmi, nutsal, maisum) and their descriptions of Dagestani possessions had distorted character.

=== Sources ===
Al-Masudi's report about the Christian population of Gumik in the 10th century may not be reliable as Al-Masudi did not visit Gumik and in his works he could use only reports of the earliest centuries. Reports of eastern authors about Gumik should be related not to the period of their lives but to the time of Arab presence in Dagestan in the 8th century.

Al-Ghumuqi suggested the Seljuk invasion of Dagestan in the beginning of the 12th century that established the authority of shamkhals in Kumukh. Al-Ghumuqi probably had one of the Turkic translations of Derbent-nameh. Referred to therein, Gazi-Qalandar, which means Islamic warlord, must have been the Arab commander Abu Muslim who in the 8th century captured Tabasaran, Kaitag and Kumukh, but decided not to move into Avaria.

History shows that no Arab or Seljuk conquest of mountainous Dagestan took place during the 9th to 12th centuries. In this period there was a long feud that spanned southern Dagestan, Derbent and Shirvan. At the beginning of the 12th century Seljuks were not able to hold on to Shirvan. In 1123 a joint army of Georgians and Shirvanians defeated the Seljuks in the battle of Shamakha. In 1173 Shirvanshah Akhsitan I ibn Minuchihr III in union with Georgia and Byzantium waged a war on Dagestanis, Kipchaks and Russians.

There are no reports from sources that the rulers of Kumukh embraced Islam before the invasion of the Mongol-Tatars in the 13th century. The names of Kumukh rulers appear only after the Mongol invasion. Islamic "Gazi-Kumukh" was first mentioned in the 14th century.

Researchers thought of the Derbent-nameh chronicle as doubtful written by the people of shamkhal in the 17th century. This chronicle is not contrary to the history and describes the Arab invasion of Dagestan. There are some facts confirming this chronicle such as the mosque built at the end of the 8th century in Kumukh and the fame of Kumukh as the old residence of the influential shamkhal. The dynasty of rulers of Kumukh with the title shamkhal must have existed in the 8th century as the rulers of shamkhalate believed.

== Mongolo-Tatar invasions in the 13th to 14th centuries ==
=== Capture of Kumukh ===
In 1239 Mongolo-Tatars advanced to capture Kumukh, the highland capital of Laks. The siege of Kumukh fortress using machines and catapults lasted about six months. In 1240 on April 8, Kumukh was captured and destroyed. Ismey-Haji Guseinov wrote: "In spring of 1240 Bugdei, one of warlords of Batu Khan, approaches Kumukh and after a fierce resistance of defenders of the fortress takes the capital of shamkhalate. However, Mongols had not managed then to establish themselves in Lakia as well as in other regions in the mountains of Dagestan".

=== Alliances ===
In the middle of the 13th century the rulers of Kumukh converted to Islam and shamkhalate became an influential Islamic state. In 1302 the ruler of Iran, who sent gifts to Badr-shamkhal of Kumukh was none other than the descendant of Genghis Khan, Ghazan Khan (1295–1304). According to Lavrov, Badr-shamkhal carried out a gazi-raid on Zirikh-Geran and built a mosque there. The records of Ali al-Ghumuqi showed that by the early 14th century in Kumukh along there were several mosques.

=== Campaign of Tamerlane ===
In 1395 Tamerlane moved to Kaitag. Shamkhal with an army of 3,000 persons attacked Tamerlane in the neighborhood of Akusha-Dargo. Nizameddin Shami reported that "Gazi-Kumuk" was an ally of the Golden Horde and that "shamkhal of Gazi-Kumuk had a custom to fight the unbelievers" that Tamerlane wanted to put to his use. Despite this Tamerlane marched against the shamkhal and after several months of siege and battles captured fortress Kuli and Tayus. Sharafuddin Yezdi, Tamerlane's court historian, wrote about the capture of "Kazi-Kumuk": "Heavy resistance is overcome, fortresses captured, inhabitants defeated, shamkhal was killed himself".

== Strengthening of shamkhalate in the 15th and 16th centuries ==
=== Authority ===
In the 15th century Shamkhalate became the largest political and Islamic center of southern Dagestan and in that connection shamkhal assumed the functions of the ruler of entire Dagestan and was named as "padishah", "wali" and "tsar". Academician M. Hasanov wrote: "Shamkhalate reached its height in the 15th century. Sources name shamkhals "walis" i.e. the rulers of entire Dagestan. The title did not match the reality. Shamkhal never managed to be the ruler of entire Dagestan. The emergence of the term speaks of the strengthening of shamkhalate".

=== Government ===
Gazikumukh Shamkhalate was ruled by the supreme council or divan where the viziers (advisers), qadis (Islamists), ameers (warlords) and shamkhal (ruler) were present in the meetings.

=== Federalism ===
The possessions of Dagestan were prone to political independence and entered into alliances with the rulers in their own interests, such as the need to defend by united forces against the invaders. In the 15th century shamkhal was in alliance with such possessions as Agul, Kurakh, Akhti, Rutul, Tsakhur, Andalal, Andi, Gidatl, Gotsatl, Karakh, Kusrakhi, Tsudakhar, Gubgen, Akusha, Kubachi, Tarki, Bujnak, Andirey and Tumen, that were managed by Jamaats, Qadis or Beks.

=== Army ===
According to Andunik-nutsal, the army of shamkhal numbered up to 100 thousand men. Turkic chronicler Mehmet Efendi wrote about Dagestanis that "when their security is threatened, under the banner of shamkhal there gathers one hundred thousand army of horsemen and footmen. It's a known fact".

=== Aggression of Iran ===
At this time the Persians decided to raise an army, seize Shirvan and Dagestan and "create a large Shi'ite state". In 1456 Iran's Safavid ruler Shaykh Junayd (1447-1456) was defeated and killed on the banks of the Samur river. In 1488 Sheykh Haydar (1456-1488), the son of Junayd, was too defeated and killed in Tabasaran. In 1500 Shah Ismail I, the son of Heydar, made a foray into Dagestan, seized Tabasaran and brutally cracked down on the civilians in retaliation for the death of Haydar.

=== Expansion of territory ===
In the 16th century shamkhals, with the support of utsmi of Kaitag, maisum of Tabasaran and nutsal of Khunzakh, directed the energy of highlanders to external wars. Raids on "unbelievers" of Georgia and Cherkessia became regular. Historian Gadjiev V. wrote that "shamkhalate in the period of its political domination became a large state on the map of medieval Caucasus". Shamkhal and the ruler of Shirvan began competing for the hegemony in the northern Azerbaijan. King of Kakhetia Levan an ally and kinsman of shamkhal also feuded with Shirvan.

=== Era of prosperity ===
A common economic zone emerged with neighbouring regions. Almost every village was a workshop organization, supplying the needs of common internal and external market. The city of Tarki became a trading point of Caspian Sea passage that brought large revenues to the treasury. The second name of Gazi-Kumukh was a "Large market" where a fair every Thursday was conducted. Ismey-Haji Guseinov writes: "Between Safavid shah and shamkhal a political and military alliance was made which was strengthened by a marriage between shah Tahmasp I and the daughter of shamkhal. The house of shamkhals became related to the rulers of Kabarda, Persia, Kakheti and Crimea.

== Rulers ==
=== Relocation to the plain ===
Ali al-Ghumuqi wrote about shamkhals that "their strong branch migrated from Gazi-Kumukh to the lowlands" of Dagestan.

=== Election of shamkhal ===
The title "shamkhal" in the first half of the 16th century was passed by seniority.

The shamkhal rulers were assumed to be descendants of Genghis Khan from the dynasty of the rulers of the Golden Horde, though no evidence for such a claim exists. The rulers were called in Turkic as "Kazikumuks" and in Persian as "Lezgins". In the Iranian works "History of Persian tazkere" and "Safina-ye hoshgu" the rulers Shamkhalate and their descendants in the royal court of the Shah were referred to as "Lezgins". Iranian "Lezgins" corresponded to the modern name of "Dagestanis". The naming of shamkhalate as "Gazikumukh" is Turkic and refers to the invasion of Tamerlane at the end of the 14th century. The naming of shamkhalate can be original only according to the Lak language, as Lak shamkhalate.

== Foreign policy ==
=== Relations with Russia ===
In 1556 diplomatic relations with the Moscow state were set. The peaceful embassy of shamkhal brought Ivan the Terrible a number of rich gifts, one of which was extraordinary: an elephant, not seen up to that time in Moscow. Shamkhal's envoy to Russia had no success as in 1557 prince Temruk Idar of Kabardia asked Ivan the Terrible to help him against the raids of shevkalski tsar (shamkhal), Crimean khan and the Turks. Ivan the Terrible sent his general Cheremisov who took over Tarki but decided not to remain there.

=== Sunzha fortress ===
In 1566 prince Matlov of Kabarda asked the Moscow tsar to put a fortress at the confluence of the Sunzha and Terek. For the construction of the fortress "came princes Andrew Babichev and Peter Protasiev with many people, guns and musket". In 1567 trying to prevent the Russians to build their stronghold at the mouth of the Sunzha, Budai-shamkhal and his son Surkhay were killed on the battlefield as evidenced by their tombstones at the cemetery of shamkhals in Gazi-Kumukh.

In 1569 prince Chopan, son of Budai-shamkhal, was elected shamkhal in Gazi-Kumukh. Territory of Chopan-shamkhal in the north extended beyond Terek river and adjoined the Khanate of Astrakhan. In the west his territory included part of Chechnya up to Kabarda. In the south, territories of Chopan-shamkhal extended "up to Shemakha itself" according to I. Gerber.

In 1570 Chopan-shamkhal jointly with Turks and Crimeans undertook an expedition to capture Astrakhan. The city was not taken and the army retreated to Azov but then invaded Kabarda. Despite the demolition of the Sunzha fortress the Russian advance to the Caucasus by the end of the 1580s recommenced.

=== Alliance with Iran ===
In Persia in the court of the shah, shamkhal had an honorable place next to the shah. Sister of Chopan-shamkhal was married to shah Tahmasp I (1514–1576). "First of all, in Persia at the time of the great festivities there were made on the right and left side of Shah's throne, the two seats on each side for the four noble defenders of the state against the four strongest powers, namely: for the khan of Kandahar, as a defender against India; for shamkhal, as a defender against Russia; for the king of Georgian, as a defender of the state against the Turks; for the khan who lives on the Arab border". According to A. Kayaev, the influence of Chopan-shamkhal in Caucasus was great so that he "intervened in the affairs of succession of Persion throne in Iran".

=== Alliance with Turkey ===
IN 1577 Chopan-shamkhal jointly with his brother Tuchelav-Bek, Gazi-Salih of Tabasaran and in alliance with the Turkish army undertook a military campaign against Sufi-Qizilbashes who were defeated. After the victory over Qizilbashes in Shirvan, Chopan-shamkhal carried out a visit to Turkey and was met in Eastern Anatolia with honors. Chopan-shamkhal was given many gifts. For his services in the war with the Persians shamkhal was given sanjak Shaburan and his brother Tuchelav sanjak Akhty and Ikhyr. Ibrahim Pechevi reported that the governor of Shirvan Osman Pasha married a daughter Tuchelav. Chopan Shamkhal pledged to defend Shirvan.

== Collapse of shamkhalate in the 17th century ==
=== Aggression of Turkey, Russia and Iran ===
At the end of the 16th century shamkhal feuded with krym-shamkhal who was supported by part of the "Kumyk land". King Alexander of Kakheti reported at the time that "shamkhal affair was bad as they (shamkhal and krym-shamkhal - E. K.) scold among themselves". In 1588 the Georgian ambassador Kaplan and Hursh reported that shamkhalate was in turmoil and asked the Russian tsar to send troops as a measure of military action against the raids shamkhal on Georgia. Russians captured Tumen principality in the northern Dagestan.

In 1594 a Khvorostinin's campaign into Dagestan took place who retreated after fighting. In 1599 Georgian ambassadors in Moscow, Saravan and Aram, reported to king Alexander of Kakheti that "neither you nor your men should be sent to fight shevkal (shamkhal), shevkal lives in the mountains, the road to him is narrow". Georgian ambassador Cyril in 1603 reported in Moscow that "shevkal and his children live more in Gazi-Kumuk in the mountains, because that place is strong".

In 1604 a Buturlin's campaign into Dagestan took place. In 1605 Russian army that occupied lowlands of Dagestan (about 8,000 men) was surrounded and routed in Karaman field 20 kilometres north of Makhachkala.

In the early 17th century Dagestan was under the threat of Iranian conquest. Iskandar Beg Munshi informed that Shah Abbas I pursued Sunnis in Azerbaijan and then took Derbent.

=== Alliance with Russia ===
Shamkhalate rulers unable to unite against the Persians concluded a military and political alliance with Russia. Shamkhalate was ruled by prince Alibek I, son of Budai-shamkhan I. In 1614 Giray of Tarki and Tuchelav of Shamkhalate (Andi-shamkhal), son Alibek I, gave an oath of allegiance to the Russian Tsar.

In 1623 Eldar of Tarki was elected shamkhal. Coronation and large banquet took place in Gazi-Kumukh. In 1635 Aidemir of Andirey, son of Sultan-Mahmud, became shamkhal. Aidemir travelled to Gazi-Kumukh "where according to their customs shamkhal is crowned". In 1640 Surkhay of Tarki was elected shamkhal.

== Known shamkhals ==
Shakhbal ibn Abdullah (740), Badr I (1295–1304), Akhsuvar I (14th century), Surkhay I (16th century), Umal-Muhammad I (1551), Budai I ibn Umal-Muhammad (1566–1567), Surkhay I ibn Umal-Muhammad (1567–1569), Chopan ibn Budai (1569–1588), Andia ibn Chopan (1605–1623), Eldar ibn Surkhay (1623-1635), Aidemir ibn Sultan Mahmud (1635–1640).

== See also ==
- History of the Lak people
- Dagestan
