= History of Lakia =

Lakia is an ancient ethnic region within the state of Dagestan. Its historical capital is Kumukh, one of the ancient cultural and religious centres of Lakia. The people of Lakia are self-designated as Laks and their native language is Lak.

== Persian Empire in the 5th century BC ==
According to the Encyclopaedia of Islam published by Brill, the ancestors of the Lak people may have been known to the ancient Greeks as "Ligyes (Λίγυες) (not to be confused with the Ligurians of ancient Northern Italy), Legaes (Λήγας), and Leges (Λήγες)". If this is the case, Herodotos mentions in his Histories these "Ligyes" as part of the contingent from the Caucasus region led by Akhaimenid prince Gobryas in his half-brother Xerxes' invasion of Greece in 480 BC.

== Persian invasions in the 5th-6th centuries ==
In the 6th century, following a long war, the Sassanid Empire took over the Eastern and North-Eastern Caucasus. In 552 the Khazars invaded Caucasus and occupied the northern plains of Dagestan. The reigning shah of Persia, Khosrau I Anushirvan, began the construction of Derbent fortress in order to protect his possessions from the new wave of nomads. Khosrau I appointed a local ruler in Kumukh, as he also did in many other possessions.

== Arab invasions in the 7th-8th centuries ==
In the 7th-8th centuries, Arab conquerors continually strove to gain a foothold in Dagestan in order to maintain political hegemony in the North-Eastern Caucasus. At the end of a long war (730-740), Arab armies (led initially by Maslamah and then by Marwan) captured mountainous Dagestan. During the Arab invasions and in the period following, such principalities as Tabasaran, Dargin, Lak and Avar were active in Dagestan.

== Shamkhalate rule in the 8th-17th centuries ==
In the middle of the 8th century, Kumukh joined the Arab Caliphate. Arabs built a mosque in Kumukh and appointed a ruler with the title "shamkhal". In 1239, the Mongolo-Tatars captured Kumukh. In the 13th century, the shamkhals of Kumukh accepted Islam. In 1396, Tamerlane waged a war with the shamkhal of Gazi-Kumukh. During the 15th century, the political influence of the shamkhals increased in the region. Then in 1642, the shamkhalate disintegrated into independent principalities.

== Khanate rule in the 17th-19th centuries ==
In 1642, Laks formed the Gazikumukh Khanate. The state was ruled by a supreme council, which was constituted by the viziers, chief qadis, warlords, and the ruler. The rulers of Kazi-Kumukh took an active part in an anti-Iranian movement in Shirvan and Dagestan. In 1725, Surkhay-khan I received the title of khan of Shirvan and Kazi-Kumukh. During the period 1734-1741, Kazi-Kumukh was thrice invaded by the Persians. In 1738, Murtazali-khan, at the head of the Dagestan army, defeated the Persians in Daria, and then in 1741 in Andalal. A later khanate fought with Russia, and in 1820 Russian general Madatov captured Kazi-Kumukh.

== Rebellion of 1877 ==
In 1877, with the beginning of the Russian-Turkish war, the Chechens and Ingush and Dagestani peoples organized a revolt, with support from Turkey. Laks captured a fortress outside Kazi-Kumukh, and the reestablishment of the Kazikumukh Khanate was proclaimed. Jafar-Bek, the son of Aglar-khan, was elected ruler, and directed his army from Kazi-Kumukh to help the insurgents in Kaitag and Tabasaran. Religious figures leading the revolt included Hasan Al-Kadarski, Kazi-Muhammad and Haji-Muhammad of Sogratl, Qadi of Tsudakhar, and Kazi-Ahmed and Abdul of Kazi-Kumukh. Small armies besieged Russian fortresses in Gunib and Levashi, but after heavy fighting were driven back by Russian troops moving in from North Caucasus, Transcaucasia, Middle Asia, and the Volga region.

After the Russian retaking of Tsudakhar, Kazi-Kumukh, and Sogratl and the execution of the "instigators" of the revolt, many were deported to distant provinces of the Russian empire. Some captives managed to escape to Iran, England, and the Ottoman Empire.

== Revolution of 1917/Soviet rule ==
In 1920, following the Russian revolution, Soviet rule was established in Lakia. On 28 October 1922 the Kazi-Kumukh district was renamed Lak. On 29 March 1935 the district was split into the Lak and Kuli districts. Collectivization and "socialist construction in the area of national culture development" was then carried out. In 1937, in a number of villages, operated cells of SVB — "Union of militant atheists": in Khosrekh - 25, in Vikhli - 16. In 1940, mosque buildings were demolished in 5 out of 14 villages of the Kuli district.

In 1930 Ali al-Ghumuqi, a Dagestani Muslim reformer and a native of Kumukh, was arrested and exiled to Southern Ural. He was accused of participating in a counterrevolutionary organization. In 1934 al-Ghumuqi returned from exile and worked in a Research Institute of Dagestan.

Local industry began to develop in the Lak district during this period. Mechanized mills and factories were built for processing raw materials. A small hydroelectric power plant was built to supply electricity. Primary-school education was made compulsory. Mass publication and distribution of books and newspapers in Lak language were initiated.

== Second World War ==
In the summer of 1944 to the lowlands of Dagestan, instead of Chechens deported on February 23, part of Laks was forcefully resettled from 43 mountainous villages and their houses demolished: 26 villages partly and 18 fully. Among these were Akbar, Archuta, Bartni, Charavali, Chayakh, Duchi, Khalapki, Khanar, Kurkhi, Marki, Nitsovkra, Shushiya, Sundaralu, Tukhchar, Turchi, Varay, and Viltakh. Ethnic Avars and Kumyks were also forcibly resettled.

During the Second World War many Lak people fought in the Red Army, and five of them were awarded the title Hero of the Soviet Union – Gadj Buganovi, Ramazan Kuznetsov, Tsakhay Makaev, Rizvan Suleymanov, and Yakov Suleymanov. Expatriate soldier Gasan-Gusain Kamalov became a national hero of Italy, and Gusain Kushayev, of France. In all, eight Laks reached the military rank of general during the war: Mikhail Khalilov, Ahmed Suleymanov, Salikh Khalilov, Vyacheslav Khalilov, Isa Pirmagomedov, Efendi Magomedov, Lev Kunbuttaev, and Imanali Shtanchaev.

== Famous Lak individuals ==
- Musa Manarov – Cosmonaut, Colonel of the Soviet Air Force; spent 541 days in space.
- Shirvani Muradov – Gold medalist in Freestyle Wrestling, Beijing 2008.
- Islam Makhachev (Russian: Ислам Рамазанович Махачев; born October 27, 1991, in Dagestan) – MMA fighter, Current UFC Lightweight Champion, Combat Sambo World Champion.
- Omari Akhmedov (Russian: Омари Ахмедов; born October 12, 1987, in Kizlyar) – Russian of Lak descent (born in Dagestan), professional mixed martial artist, competes in the Welterweight division of the Ultimate Fighting Championship.
- Khachilaev Nadirshah Mugadovich – former head of the Muslim Union of Russia, member of parliament, State Duma of Russia.

== See also ==
- Lakia
- Shamkhalate of Kazi-Kumukh
- Khanate of Kazi-Kumukh
- Dagestan
- History of Dagestan
- Lak people of Iran
