= Kurkli =

Kurkli Куркли Ккурккул
- Selo
- Location within Republic of Dagestan Location within Russia
- Coordinates: 42°16′N 47°07′E
- Country: Russia
- Region: Republic of Dagestan
- District: Laksky District
- Time zone: UTC+3:00

Kurkli (Russian: Куркли; Lak: Ккурккул) is a rural locality (a selo) and the administrative centre of Kurklinksy Selsoviet, Laksky District, Republic of Dagestan, Russia. The population was 419 as of 2010. There are 6 streets.

== Geography ==
Kurkli is located 28 km south of Kumukh (the district's administrative centre) by road. Kuli and Sumbatl are the nearest rural localities.

== Nationalities ==
Laks live there.

== Famous residents ==
- Chukundalav (poet)
- Shchaza iz Kurkli (poet)
