= Ilchi (1917) =

Ilchi ('The Herald') was a Lak language newspaper published in 1917 by the Daghestani Propaganda Bureau. It was edited by G. S. Saidov and A. K. Zakuev.
