= Kumukh =

Kumukh Гъумук
- Village
- Location within Republic of Dagestan Location within Russia
- Coordinates: 42°10′14″N 47°07′03″E
- Country: Russia
- Federal Subject: Dagestan
- District: Laksky District
- Elevation: 1,512 m (4,961 ft)

Population
  - Total: 2,483
- Time zone: UTC+3 (MSK)
  - Summer (DST): UTC+4 (MSD)
- Area code: +7 87267
- Website: www.gazikumuh.ru

Kumukh (Russian: Кумух; Lak: Гъумук), also known as Gazi Kumukh, is a village and the administrative center of Laksky District in Dagestan. It is located on the banks of the Kazikumukh Koysu, a branch of the Sulak River.

== Etymology ==
Laks use the name "Lak" or "Lakral kanu" (the Lak place) to refer to Kumukh. The naming of the surrounding villages as "Lakral sharhurdu" meant that they belong to Lak. In all probability, in ancient times Laks lived in the small village of Lak. The toponym "Lak" was adopted only in the Lak language. In the understanding of Laks, Kumukh was a fortress of Lak city and then in the general sense became the capital of the Lak principality.

Historical literature mentioned Kumukh in a variety of pronunciations. Al-Masudi in the 10th century mentioned "Gumik" as a city or a principality. Al-Kufi in the 10th century mentioned fortress "'Amik" which is taken as "Gumik ". Ibn Rushd in the 10th century named Kumukh as a fortress "Alal and Gumik". The prefix "Alal" can be taken as "al-Lak" that was the name of the inhabitants of Kumukh or its territory.

In the 14th century Kumukh was named "Gazi-Gumuk" (in Lak). The prefix "Gazi" meant that Kumukh was the military and political center of Muslims. In the 14th century Turkic historians (Shami, Yezdi) mentioned Kumukh as "Gazi-Kumuk" (the possession of shamkhal). In the 15th–16th centuries the inhabitants of northern Dagestan named Kumukh as "Kazi-Kumuk" (in Turkic) and "Kazi-Kumukh" (in Russian). In the chronicle Derbent-Nameh (17th century) Kumukh of 6th century and the 8th century was named "Kumuk". In the 19th century Russians capturing Kumukh named it "Kazi-Kumyk" and its inhabitants "Lak" which for the Laks also meant a toponym.

== History ==
Kumukh is the historical center of the Lak people and existed before they converted to Islam. The first reliable information about Kumukh dates to the 6th century when Kumukh was part of Sassanid Empire. In 734 Kumukh became part of the Arab caliphate. General and historian Vasily Potto wrote: "The Arabs have put someone named Shah-Bal the ruler of the Laks". In 778 the construction of the first mosque was completed in Kumukh and Islam got established in Lakia. Gazi-Kumukh had been in the past a large trading and political center of Dagestan and capital of Gazikumukh Khanate. During the Russian Empire, the settlement was the administrative capital of the Kazikumukhsky Okrug.

== Craftsmen ==
In the 19th century the main market for products of Kazi-Kumukh Khanate was in Kazi-Kumukh where one could see not only Laks with their goods, but also Avars, Dargins and Lezgins. Inhabitants of Kazi-Kumukh supplied almost all of Dagestan with different sorts of copperware. The pottery products of Lak Balkhar was popular in Dagestan. Kazi-Kumukh was the center of arms production too.

O. V. Markgraf, one of the members of the Committee on artisanal crafts of the Caucasus, wrote in his book "Essay on the artisanal crafts of the Northern Caucasus in 1882": "In the past Kumukh village deservedly became famous as a kind of capital and production center of the district, known for the most exquisite examples of weapons art."

Lak artisans were mainly engaged in weapons manufacturing. After the completion of Caucasian War, Laks began to develop other types of crafts — gold and silver processing, production of footwear and clothing, copper work. The best known jewellers were from Kumukh, Nitsovkra, Duchi, Khurukra, Chitur, Churtakh, Tsushar, Chari and Unchukatl. Gold and silver produce decorated with enamel and ivory of Kumukh masters was well priced. There were 150 goldsmiths in Kumukh along.

J. L. Lazorev noted that "In the industrial and property sense Kazikumuks serve as an example for all the mountaineers of Dagestan, like the Armenians in Transcaucasia they are smart, brave and warlike". In 1882 Gazi-Kumukh was visited by Russian scientist Dmitry Anuchin (earned a worldwide reputation in research on archaeology and ethnography) who wrote that "Kazi-Kumukh is frequented very seldom, meanwhile it is one of the most famous in Dagestan. Some residents are engaged in agriculture but more in manufacturing of weapons, copper utensils, as well as trade.

== Seasonal work ==
At the end of the 19th century Laks went to work in different cities of Russia. In 1868 Alexander Komarov wrote that from Gazi-Kumukh District "almost all adult men travel to work to different places". At the Paris exhibition in 1889 there was presented a copper washstand with a lantern of Lak master Ali Buta Shaban. In Kutaisi province there were over 50 registered Lak jewelers, 120 in Tiflis province, and 90 in Tiflis along. Gunsmiths to Vladikavkaz came mainly from Dagestan and in particular from Gazi-Kumukh and Kubachi.

Among Lak gunsmiths families of Guzunov, Abdullah Akiyev and Mulla Omarov were well known. Osman Omarov was a master of cold arms, the native of Gazi-Kumukh, who led a workshop in Vladikavkaz that employed 15–20 people. Osman's blades were highly priced and enjoyed the greatest popularity. Frequent customers were the Cossacks. Guzun Guzunov was master of cold arms and silversmiths, the native of Gazi-Kumukh, who led the workshop with his brother Durpal. In 1889 the workshop of Guzun had expanded and employed 20–30 people from Gazi-Kumukh and Kubachi. Guzunov produced sabers, swords, daggers or kinjals (after the end of the Caucasian War the tsarist administration banned residents of the Caucasus and master gunsmiths to produce modern firearm). The Lak scholar and madrassa teacher Ali al-Ghumuqi was born in Gazi-Kumukh. The city's historic craftsmen, including Munchaev, Abdurahman Shakhshaev, Haji-Muhammed, are well known.

== Climate ==
Kumukh has a warm-summer humid continental climate (Köppen climate classification Dfb).

Climate data for Kumukh
Month	Jan	Feb	Mar	Apr	May	Jun	Jul	Aug	Sep	Oct	Nov	Dec	Year
Mean daily maximum °C (°F)	−0.9 (30.4)	−0.4 (31.3)	3.6 (38.5)	10.8 (51.4)	15.7 (60.3)	19.6 (67.3)	22.7 (72.9)	21.6 (70.9)	18.1 (64.6)	12.4 (54.3)	6.2 (43.2)	1.7 (35.1)	10.9 (51.7)
Mean daily minimum °C (°F)	−8.5 (16.7)	−7.5 (18.5)	−4.1 (24.6)	0.7 (33.3)	6.1 (43.0)	9.2 (48.6)	12.0 (53.6)	11.7 (53.1)	7.4 (45.3)	3.1 (37.6)	−1.0 (30.2)	−5.5 (22.1)	2.0 (35.6)
Average precipitation mm (inches)	18 (0.7)	26 (1.0)	38 (1.5)	60 (2.4)	97 (3.8)	104 (4.1)	73 (2.9)	66 (2.6)	63 (2.5)	51 (2.0)	35 (1.4)	18 (0.7)	649 (25.6)
Source: Climate-Data.org

== Economy ==
The city's economy centers on farming and construction, and the city is served by a school and hospital.

== Notable people ==
- Jamaluddin al-Kumuki (1788-1869), a Naqshbandi tariqa shaykh and relative of Shaykh Shamil.

== Gallery ==
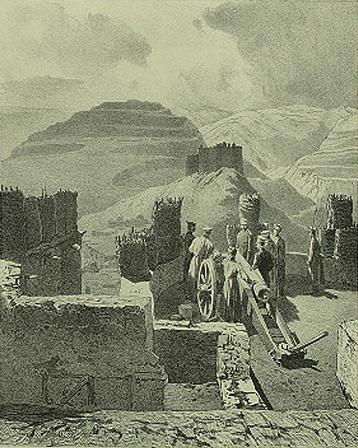

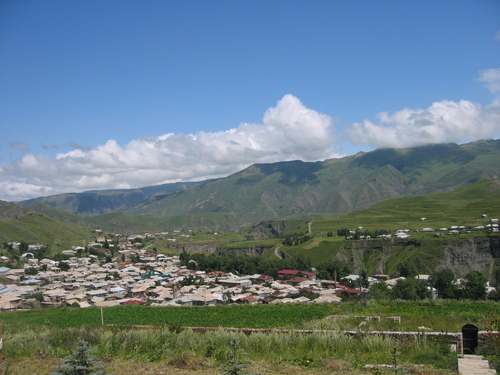

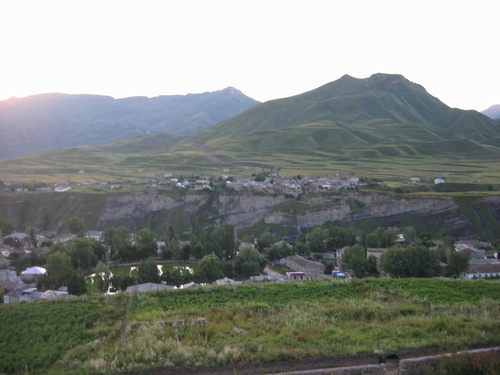

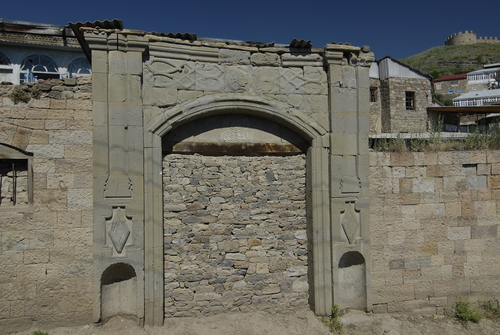

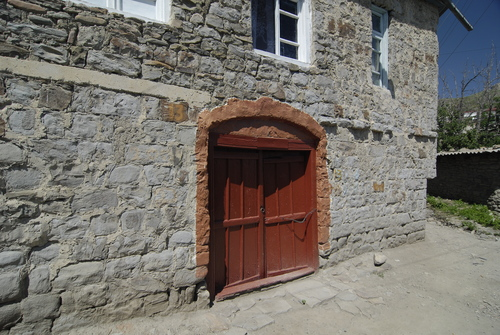

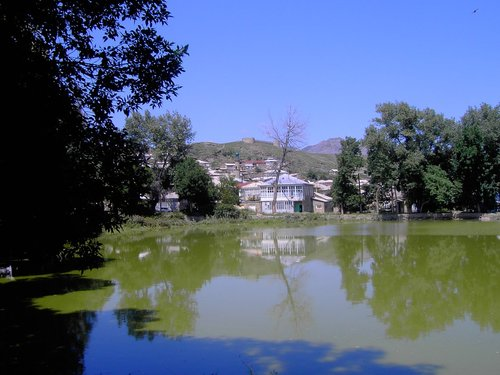

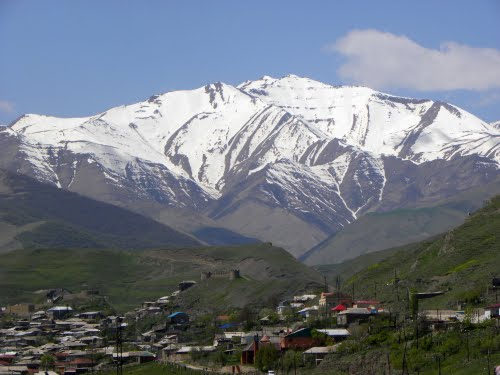

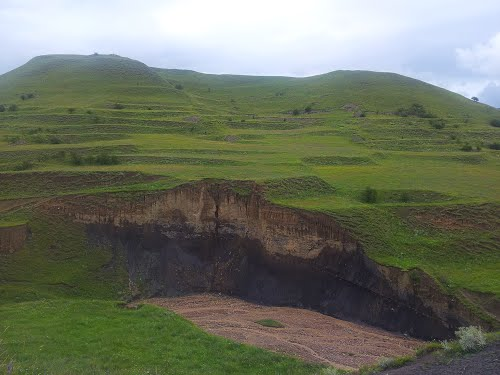

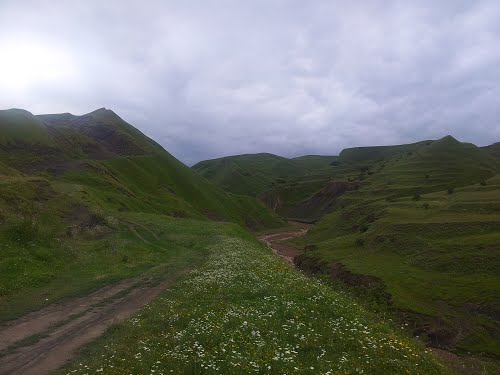

== See also ==
- History of the Lak people
- History of Dagestan
- Northeastern Caucasian languages
- Lak language
- Laksky District
- Kulinsky District
