= Ali al-Ghumuqi =

Dagestani Islamic theologian and polymath (1878–1943)

ʿAlī al-Ghumūqī
- على بن عبد الحميد الغموقى; Аьли Къаяхъал
- Title: ʿĀlim; Qadi

Personal life
- Born: 1878 Gazikumukh, Dagestan Oblast, Caucasus Viceroyalty
- Died: 21 December 1943 (aged 64–65) Georgiyevka, Kazakh SSR, Soviet Union
- Cause of death: Typhus
- Resting place: Ayagoz, Kazakhstan
- Region: Dagestan
- Education: Al-Azhar University

Religious life
- Religion: Sunni Islam
- School: Shafi'ism
- Movement: Islamic modernism (Jadid)

Senior posting
- Based in: Dagestan
- Period in office: 1905–1938
- Influenced by: Muhammad Abduh, Jamal al-Din al-Afghani, Rashid Rida
- Influenced: Abu Sufyan Akayev, Muhammad-Sa'id al-Awari, Nazir ad-Durgeli, Said Gabiyev, Djelal ed-Din Korkmasov, Najm al-Din Samursky, Gamzat Tsadasa

ʿAlī ibn ‘Abd al-Ḥamīd al-Ghumūqī (Note: Arabic: على بن عبد الحميد الغموقى; Lak: Аьли Къаяхъал, romanized: Äli Q:aaˤqal) (Note: Written in Russian as Али Каяев (Ali Kayayev) or Али ал-Гумуки (Ali al-Gumuki).) (1878 – 21 December 1943) was a Dagestani Islamic theologian and polymath who was at various points a traveller, historian, educator, journalist, politician, ʿālim, qadi and ethnographer. One of the most prominent intellectuals in Dagestan's history, al-Ghumūqī was one of the leaders of the Jadid movement in the region during the early 20th century.

Born into an aristocratic family, al-Ghumūqī studied under several sheikhs before travelling to Astrakhan, where he developed an interest in academia. He later studied at Al-Azhar University in Egypt, becoming acquainted with Islamic modernism. He was deported from the Ottoman Empire during the 1908 Young Turk Revolution and returned to Dagestan, where he became the unofficial editor of the Jaridat Daghistan newspaper, advocating for the spread of Jadid policies across the North Caucasus. Al-Ghumūqī supported the Russian Revolution and was an important influence on Dagestan's early communist leadership, many of whom had been his students. He was arrested and exiled during the Great Purge after his students' downfall, dying in 1943 of typhus.

== Early life and education ==
ʿAlī ibn ‘Abd al-Ḥamīd al-Ghumūqī was born in 1878 in the village of Gazi Kumukh to an aristocratic (uzden) family of ethnic Laks. The al-Ghumūqī family was among the oldest extant families in the village at the time, first being mentioned in 1474. Alī's father was a gunsmith active in southern Dagestan and Elizavetpol Governorate, and was killed in a knife fight in 1884, when Alī was seven years old. Following his father's death, Alī and his brother Ramazan were raised by their paternal aunt, Nazhavat. He was educated at the madrasa of Gazi Kumukh's grand mosque, as was common at the time. After completing his studies in Gazi Kumukh, al-Ghumūqī lived as a nomad, studying at several madrasas throughout the Caucasus and the Ottoman Empire. During this time he became well-read in Arabic, tafsir and the fiqh of the Shafi'i school.

Al-Ghumūqī was a student of several prominent sheikhs in Dagestan; the exact number of sheikhs that he studied under is unclear. It is known that sheikh Ali of Sogratl was particularly fond of al-Ghumūqī and played a significant role in his education, housing him for five years and supporting his studies by giving him full access to his personal library. His first major work, produced for his first teacher sheikh Ghazi ibn Sayyid Hussein, was a copy of Muhammad Tahir al-Qarakhi's Brilliance of Dagestani Sabres in Some of the Battles of Shamil, which he completed in 1899 and delivered to Abd al-Rahman ibn Abd al-Wahhab, an Islamic scholar in Astrakhan. Abd al-Rahman soon invited al-Ghumūqī to Astrakhan to teach at the city's madrasa and study the sciences, an offer which al-Ghumūqī accepted.

=== Astrakhan period, studies at Al-Azhar ===
Al-Ghumūqī arrived in Astrakhan in 1899, at the age of twenty. His "Astrakhan period", (Note: Russian: Астраханский период, romanized: Astrakhansky period) as this time is termed by historian Vladimir Bobrovnikov, was the basis for his later activities, as he began studying the history of Islam in the Caucasus. Al-Ghumūqī was particularly interested in primary sources dating as far back as the medieval period, and he publicised several sources which had previously languished in obscurity in his former teachers' libraries. During this period al-Ghumūqī began to attract a devoted group of students, many of whom (such as Muhammad-Sa'id al-Awari) would later become academics in their own right.

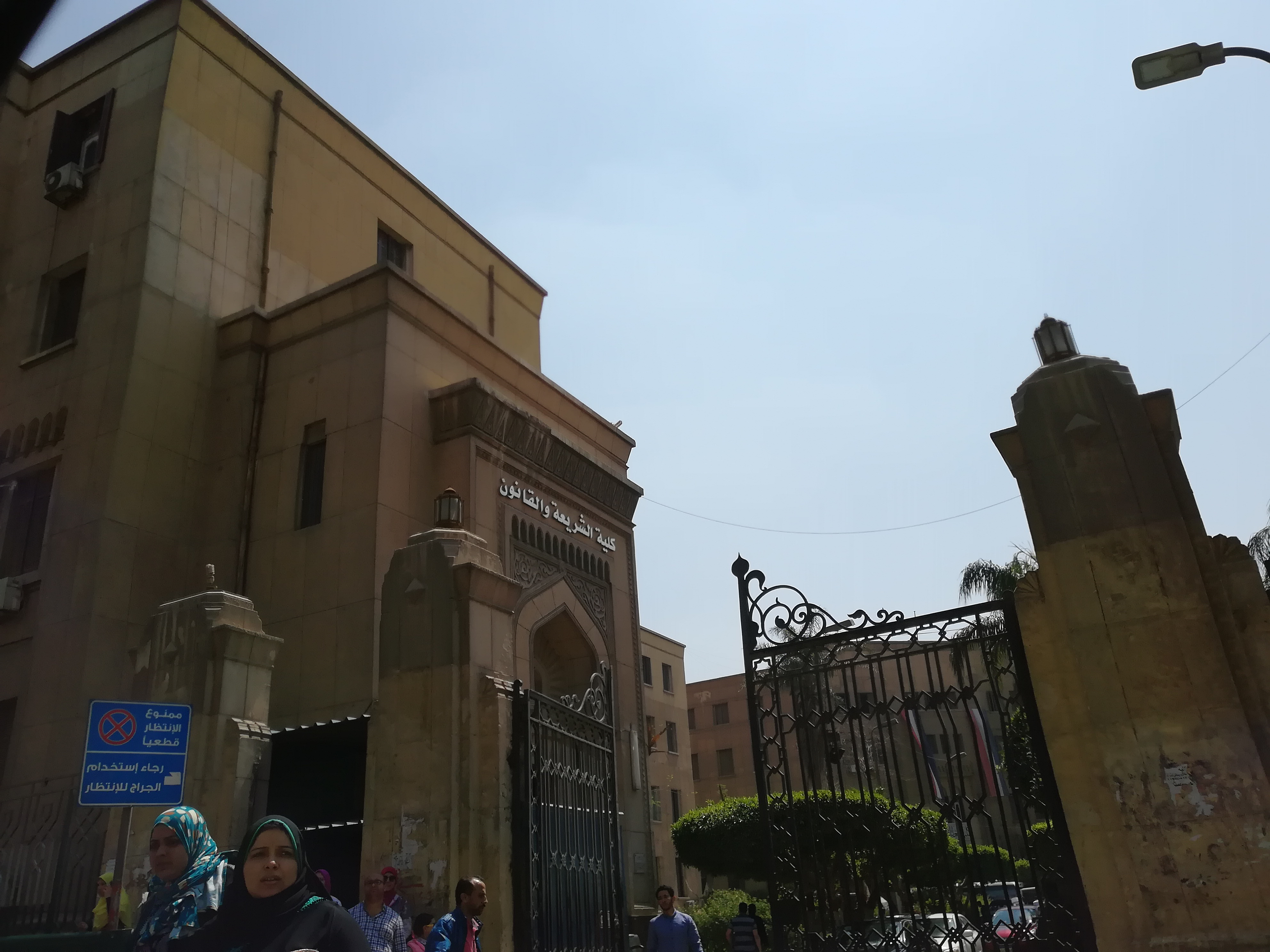
Al-Ghumūqī studied at Al-Azhar University (pictured in 2018) from 1905 to 1907 or 1908

In 1905 al-Ghumūqī left Astrakhan for Cairo, then part of the Ottoman Khedivate of Egypt, in order to further his studies at Al-Azhar University. Al-Ghumūqī's activities at Al-Azhar were disputed until the discovery of his manuscripts following the dissolution of the Soviet Union, and a popular legend claimed that he had been appointed as a professor due to his knowledge surpassing the university's curriculum.

At the time of al-Ghumūqī's arrival, Egyptian Islam was experiencing significant upheaval due to the Nahda and the emergence of Islamic modernism. The Egyptian modernists advocated for educational reform on the basis of Islamic sources and fiqh, in contrast to Muslim intellectuals within Russia, who argued that it was necessary to adopt European models of education to further develop society. Unlike Crimea and the Volga region, where Islamic modernism had previously emerged in the Russian Empire, the North Caucasus had closer connections to the Ottoman Empire and Arab world as a result of Arabic's status as the region's lingua franca at the time; Egyptian modernism was therefore more appealing to the North Caucasus than other forms of Islamic modernism.

Al-Ghumūqī left Al-Azhar in 1907 or 1908 for Constantinople, intending to continue his academic studies. However, he soon became a supporter of the Young Turk Revolution, condemning Sultan Abdul Hamid II's rule as despotic and maintained by espionage, repression and fear. In response, the Ottoman government arrested al-Ghumūqī and, after a month in prison, deported him back to Russia. Later Soviet historiography claimed without evidence that he was deported due to his association with Young Turk revolutionary Mizancı Murat. Al-Ghumūqī would be one of the last citizens of the Soviet Union to have studied at Al-Azhar, and his time in Turkey and Egypt inspired his later ideological and theological views.

== The Jadid and Jaridat Daghistan ==
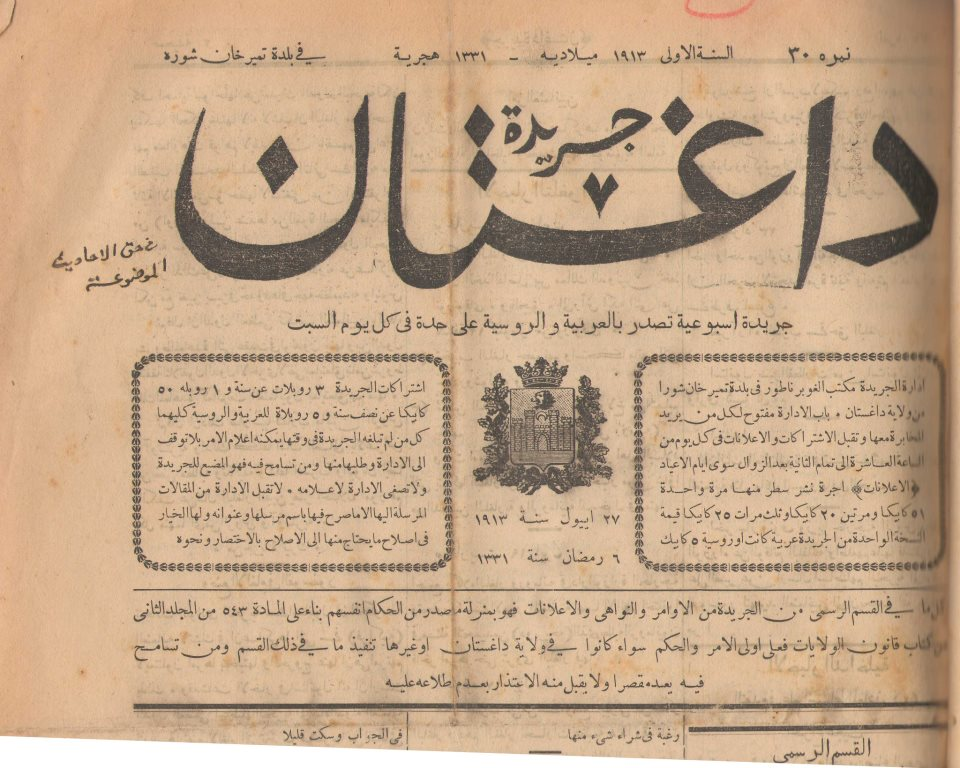
Jaridat Daghistan, a newspaper which al-Ghumūqī frequently wrote in and served as de facto editor of

By the time al-Ghumūqī returned to Dagestan, the Jadid movement was on the rise. The Jadids advocated for a return to Islam as preached by Muhammad and his followers, as well as the adoption of technological achievements from Europe in order to bring about the end of Russian colonialism. They generally advocated for a system of classes and teaching in the local language, rather than Arabic, in madrasas, as well as the introduction of desks and blackboards to education.

Al-Ghumūqī, like many other Jadids, believed that poverty, neglect and the enforced teaching of Arabic were responsible for the poor state of Dagestan's education; he noted that complex Arabic grammar and syntax was presented to students at the beginning of their studies with the belief that they would spend one to two decades learning Arabic, which instead resulted in high rates of dropping out. Al-Ghumūqī instead argued that students should first be taught simple Arabic in their native language and later given more complex parts of Arabic grammar. He further advocated for the introduction of the sciences into madrasa curriculum and often criticised local Islamic theologians.

Al-Ghumūqī's proposed reforms were controversial at the time; more conservative voices argued that deemphasising Arabic would lead to moral decay and a decline in Islam, while other, more liberal scholars, following the model of Jadids elsewhere in Russia, believed that al-Ghumūqī's "Egyptian model" was too strict in its interpretation of Islam and that European models of education needed to be further emulated. Al-Ghumūqī attracted a group of loyal followers, including sheikhs Muhammad Aburrashid al-Qarakani, Masud al-Muquqi, Muhammad Umari al-Uqli. In 1908, he established a madrasa in the Terek Oblast village of Kyondelen, followed by two madrasas in the Dagestani villages of Temir-Khan-Shura (now Buynaksk, 1913) and Gazi Kumukh (1918). As an educator, al-Ghumūqī was sought out by students from throughout the North Caucasus, and during his time at the Gazi Kumukh madrasa he had 300 students. Al-Ghumuqi published his first book, a history of Dagestan between the 8th and 19th centuries titled al-Hikayat al-Madiyah, was published in 1910 by Muhammad-Mirza Mavrayev, beginning a lifelong political and business partnership between the two men.

The newspaper Jaridat Daghistan (Arabic: جريدة داغستان, lit. 'Newspaper of Dagestan') began operating in January 1913 as the mouthpiece of the Russian colonial administration in Dagestan. Despite the Russian government's intentions, the newspaper quickly became an organ for Muslim intellectuals from as far west as Circassia. Al-Ghumūqī was the de facto editor of Jaridat Daghistan, and frequently wrote in favour of his reformist viewpoints. He expressed support for the revival of ijtihad among adherents of the Shafi'i school and used the newspaper to propagate the Jadid movement's ideas throughout the North Caucasus.

During this time al-Ghumūqī, influenced by Egyptian Islamic modernist Jamal al-Din al-Afghani, argued that women were incapable of possessing equal intelligence to men, and that the statement that "men are the guardians of women" would soon be scientifically proven. At the same time, he lamented that men "have used and continue to use women for themselves as captives, slaves, and servants", and praised Ottoman feminists. Like many Jadids in Dagestan, al-Ghumūqī felt that women could contribute significantly to the reform of education due to their role in raising children, and he wrote in 1916 that it was positive for women to be taught the sciences.

Al-Ghumūqī was controversial among intellectuals at the time for his opposition to armed struggle in order to liberate the Caucasus from Russian rule after the Caucasian War and the subsequent Circassian genocide; he cited Muhammad's refusal to begin the jihad until after the hijrah as an example, saying that in both cases to declare a jihad prematurely would have caused unnecessary deaths of Muslims. He instead believed that only a revolution in Russia proper would lead to the end of colonialism.

== Revolution and Soviet rule ==
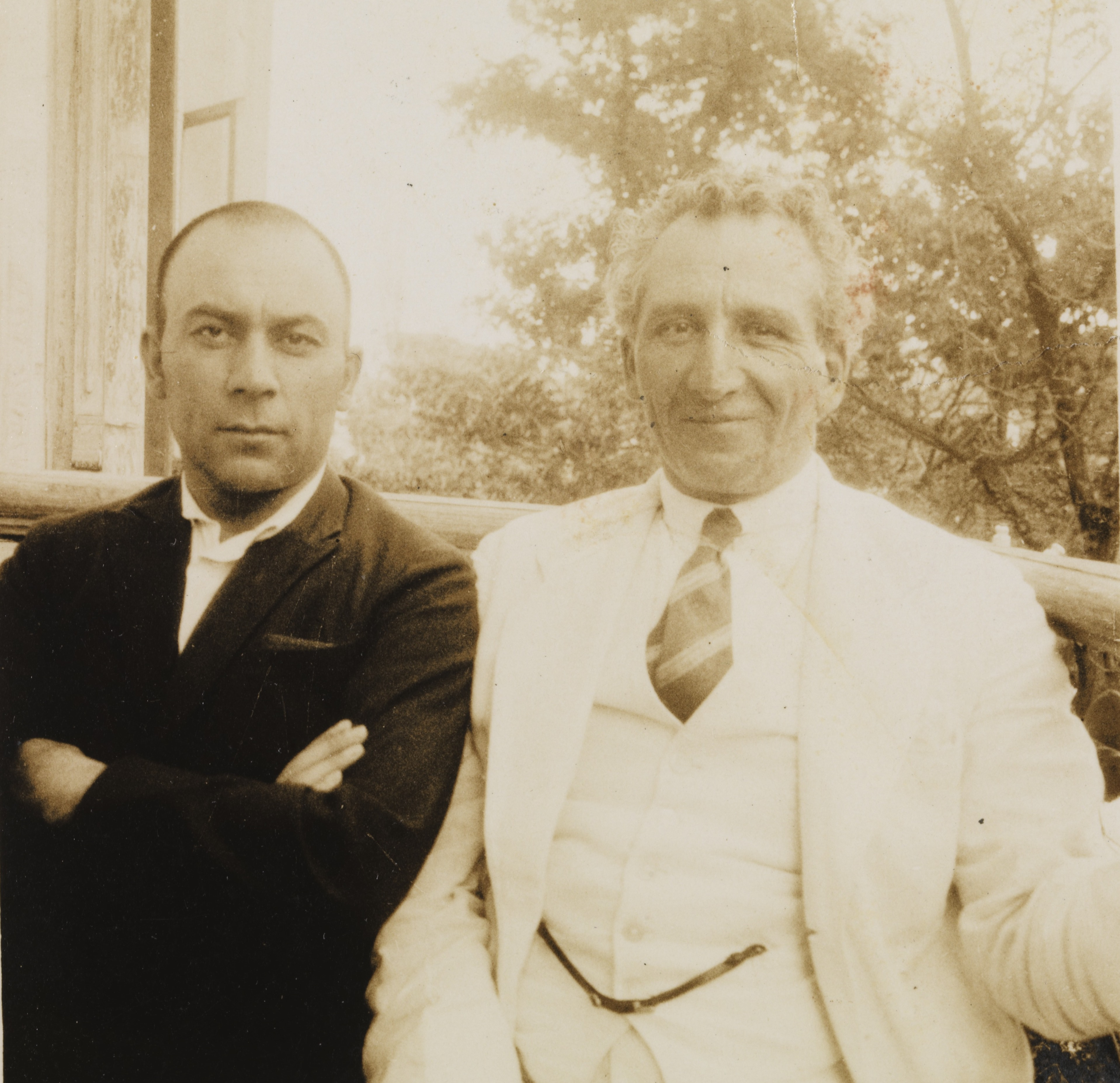
Najm al-Din Samursky and Djelal ed-Din Korkmasov, early leaders of the Dagestan Autonomous Soviet Socialist Republic, were both former students of al-Ghumūqī who were influenced by his Jadidism

Al-Ghumūqī, like most other Muslims, supported the February Revolution, writing in Jaridat Daghistan,

If we ourselves do not act for the decision of our fates, if we do not awaken from sleep, then others shall begin to decide our fates, treating us as cattle, they will do as they desire. And what shall emerge from this is not freedom, but autocracy.

At the time of the revolution, al-Ghumūqī was an ʿālim. After the Mountainous Republic of the Northern Caucasus became independent from Russia, he successfully ran for election to the Dagestan Regional Committee, and he was also elected to the province's Executive Committee in January 1918. Meanwhile, the Russian Civil War was beginning to reach the North Caucasus. Ullu-biy Buynaksky's soviet in the city of Port-Petrovsk (now Makhachkala) formed units of Red Guards and began harassing the local bourgeois, while Najmuddin of Gotzo attempted to declare himself Imam of Dagestan and Chechnya, a title of prestige among local Muslims. Al-Ghumūqī sided with communists Djelal ed-Din Korkmasov and Mahach Dahadayev in denouncing Najmuddin's efforts as illegal and unjustified.

Al-Ghumūqī closed the offices of Jaridat Daghistan in March 1918 amidst the First Battle of Port-Petrovsk and fled from Temir-Khan-Shura, the Dagestani capital, to Gazi Kumukh. Following his flight, al-Ghumūqī remained active in the scientific community, maintaining his contacts with prominent scientists from the region. The White Russian invasion of Dagestan and subsequent 1919–1920 North Caucasus uprising led him to generally withdraw from politics, and he served as qadi of a sharia court in Gazi Kumukh from 1918.

While not holding any office, al-Ghumūqī, like other Jadids, significantly influenced the leadership of early communist Dagestan. His madrasas had served as the source of education for what historian Alex Marshall describes as "a whole generation" of communist politicians, and his works on awqaf were a significant influence on Najm al-Din Samursky, the first head of government of the Dagestan Autonomous Soviet Socialist Republic. Al-Ghumūqī's belief that waqf endowments should be used to fund education was combined with Sergei Yesenin's advocacy for a "steel enema" of infrastructure as part of Samursky's proposal to diminish and eventually abolish Islamic clergy without sparking local uprisings.

Al-Ghumūqī retained a high level of popularity among the communist elite throughout the 1920s, with Alibek Takho-Godi, Dagestan's Commissar for Education, commissioning him to create a book detailing the 1919–1920 uprising. Al-Ghumūqī began creating a work which soon grew to several volumes in size, and it ultimately went unfinished due to the expiration of the book's November 1929 deadline. The government of Joseph Stalin soon began persecuting Jadids, and in 1930 or 1931 al-Ghumūqī was imprisoned and sentenced to five years' internal exile in Chelyabinsk. He was later moved to Voronezh before being released in 1934 upon the intercession of former student Korkmasov, who was now Secretary of the Dagestan Regional Committee of the All-Union Communist Party. After his release, al-Ghumūqī turned to ethnography, working at the Dagestan Research Institute of National Cultures.

=== Exile and death ===
During the Great Purge, al-Ghumūqī was re-arrested in 1938 on the basis of his personal connection to Korkmasov (who was executed) and claims that he was committing espionage on behalf of Turkey. Shortly before his arrest, al-Ghumūqī hid his extensive library of manuscripts in a barrel and told his wife Aishat to hide them from the Soviet secret police. He told her to inform their son, Abdul Majid, of the manuscripts, but Aishat instead told their daughter Nazhavat, fearing that if the family was discovered as having such a large collection of manuscripts it would lead to Abdul Majid being sent to a Gulag.

Al-Ghumūqī was exiled to the village of Georgiyevka in the Kazakh Soviet Socialist Republic (now part of Semey, Kazakhstan). He retained faith in the Soviet system and government despite his persecution, saying "Don't be sad, sonny, we shall prevail," to a local youth who was conscripted during World War II. He also continued to write manuscripts on scraps of paper during his exile. While living in Kazakhstan, he contracted typhus, dying on 21 December 1943. He was later rehabilitated on 17 November 1981, formally clearing him of any guilt.
