= Laks (Caucasus) =

Ethnic group in Dagestan, Russia

Laks, Gazikumuks
Лакру, Гъумучи

Total population
- c. 200,000

Regions with significant populations
- Russia: Dagestan 162,518: 173,416
- Turkmenistan: 4,100
- Uzbekistan: 3,400
- Tajikistan: 2,300
- Azerbaijan: 1,600
- Ukraine: 900
- Kazakhstan: 700

Languages
- Lak

Religion
- Sunni Islam

Related ethnic groups
- Other Northeast Caucasian peoples

The Laks (also Gazikumuks, self-designation: Лакру, [Lakru] ) Гъумучи, [Gumuchi] ) are a Northeast Caucasian ethnic group native to an inland region known as Lakia within Dagestan in the North Caucasus. They speak the Lak language. Laks historically live in the Lakskiy and Kulinskiy districts of Dagestan. There are about 200,000 ethnic Laks in the world.

== Ethnonym ==
Areas in Dagestan where Laks live

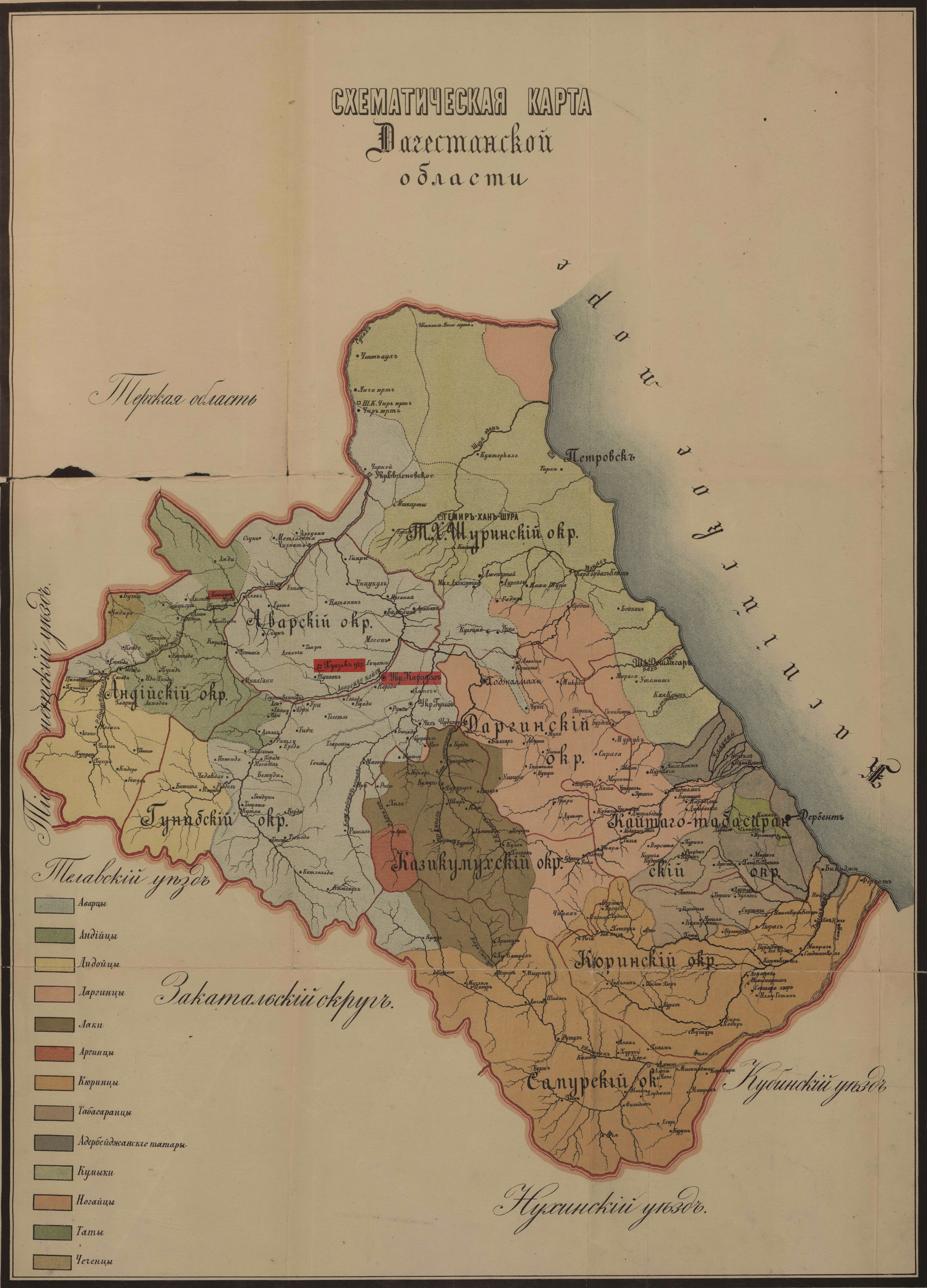
Schematic map of the Dagestan Oblast from 1895 by E. I. Kozubskiy

The word "Lak" is the self-designation of the Lak people as in Lak expressions: "zhu Lak buru" — we are Lak; "zhu Lakral khalq buru" — we are Lak people; "Laktal" — Laks; "Lakssa" — Lakian, Laks, Lak man; "Lakkuchu" — Lakian man; "Lakku maz" — Lakian language; "Lakkuy" — Lakia; "Lakral kanu" — Lak place; "Lakral kanu" — Lak district; "Lakku bilayat" — Lak country; "Lakral pachchahlug" — Lak state. Laks use the name "Lak" as their ethnonym and placename.

P. K. Uslar (1864) reported on the use of self-designation "Lak" by residents of Gazi-Kumukh: "Lakkuchu, Lakkuchunal, nominative plural Lak, genitive Lakral — Kazikumukh man; Lak — the name of the whole country; ta uri Lakkuy — he lives in Kazikumukh; ta nai uri Lakkuya — he comes from Kazikumukh; ta Lakku mazray galga ti uri — he speaks in Laks language; Lakku adat — Kazikumukh custom; Lakral kanu — Kazikumukh, lit. the place of Lak people".

Russian army generals and historians A. V. Komarov (1869) and N. F. Dubrovin (1871) in their distinct writings on the history and ethnography of Caucasus mentioned that the self-designation of the residents of Gazi-Kumukh was "Lak" whom they named "Laki" (Laks).

In the population census of Dagestan Oblast of 1886 the residents of Kazikumukh Okrug were named "Laki" (Russian "Лаки"). On the schematic map of the Dagestan Oblast of 1895, compiled by historian and ethnographer E. I. Kozubskiy, the residents of Kazikumukh Okrug are called "Laki".

According to the Soviet and Russian scientist-philologist, linguist-Iranian scholar and etymologist V. I. Abaev, the self-name "lak" is in connection with the term "lag", as the Caucasian peoples called the "serf".

The former self-name of the Laks was Kumuk.

Soviet and Russian onomatologist (onomast), philologist and toponymist R. A. Ageeva writes: "The use of the term 'varnish' as a self-designation of the Laks is a secondary phenomenon ... In a number of surrounding languages, the more ancient self-name of the Laks has been preserved - gumuk, gumek, kumuk, etc. "

== History ==
Kumukh historically was a fortress-city where the residence of the rulers of Lak people was. Kumukh is the ancient capital of Lakia. The history of the Laks can be divided into several parts. The first part is the era of Anushirwan, who appointed a ruler called Kumukh. In the 6th century Kumukh was one of the political centers in the highlands of Dagestan. The second part is the era of the shamkhals of Kumukh, who were first mentioned as the rulers of the Laks in the 8th century. In the 13th century the shamkhals of Kumukh accepted Islam and Lakia became an Islamic state. In the 15th century Kumukh became the main Islamic and political center of Dagestan. The third part is the era of the khans of Kumukh who opposed the colonial policy of Persia, Russia and Turkey.

== Society ==
=== Religion ===
Most Laks believe in Sunni Islam (Shafi'i school). Sunni Islam encourages group solidarity; their members help each other find work and housing, arrange marriages, pay the kalim, maintain burial societies, resolve disputes, and so forth. The first mosque of the Lak people was built in 777-778 in Kumukh. Historian A. V. Komarov (1869) wrote: "Laki and in particular the residents of their main village of Gumuk were among the first Dagestani tribes who accepted Islam ... Abu Muselim himself went to Gumuk and built there a mosque in 777 AD as the inscription on the mosque reads". According to Al-Masudi, the residents of Kumukh in the 8th century were Christians. Shamkhals of Kumukh embraced Islam at the end of the 13th century. In the 14th century, Kumukh became the gazi-center and was named Gazi-Kumukh. In the 15th century, shamkhals played a role in spreading Islam in Dagestan.

=== Anthropology ===
According to prof. Gadjiyev A.G., Lak people belong to the Northcaucasian race: "Our research in 1961 has led to some clarification of the area of Caucasionic race (Northcaucasian race) in Dagestan. In this paper the groups that belong to Caucasionic race are those of western variant. These are the Ando-Tsunti people and the bulk of Avars, Laks, Dargin. According to the specifics of pigmentation, but not the size of the face, Rutuls are close to them".

=== Economy ===
Because the traditional Lak lands are mountainous and very dry, agriculture was of secondary importance in the traditional economy. In the mountainous regions, the economy was dominated by the raising of sheep and goats, and also some horses, cattle, and mules. Meat and milk products were major components of the Lak diet, although they also grew barley, peas, wheat and some potatoes. Most animal husbandry was the responsibility of males, whereas agriculture was mostly that of women. The Lak territory had no forests, and there was a chronic shortage of wood for building and fuel. Wheat and fruits and vegetables were grown in the lower areas, especially in the new Lak areas in northern Dagestan.

The practice of transhumant sheepherding required that for several months each year, males moved to the lowlands to pasture their animals. Here they came into contact with different Dagestani peoples. Other Dagestani mountaineers grazed their sheep along with those of the Laks in the lands of the Kumyks. This is why most Lak males were multilingual. Many villages specialized in artisanry and crafts. Kumukh was famed for its jewelers and coppersmiths; Kaya was known for its merchants and markets; Unchukatl for saddle and harness makers; Ubra for masons and tinsmiths; Kuma for candy makers; Shovkra for shoe- and bootmakers; Tsovkra for acrobats; and Balkar for ceramics and jug makers. Lak women also engaged in cottage industries such as rug weaving, spinning, textile making, and ceramics, whereas the men engaged in leather working and tool making.

Many of these traditions survived during the Soviet period because it was difficult to develop the Lak territories, which are isolated and have few resources. Textiles and clothing, leather working and shoe making, and the production of meat, cheese, and butter are still the dominant industries in this region. Many Laks continue to migrate (both permanently and seasonally) to other areas of Dagestan (and in particular to the cities) and to other surrounding areas to find employment. Whereas in the traditional pattern of transhumant animal husbandry, Lak males and their animals walked over the treacherous mountain passes and forded rivers, the herds are now taken by truck to their winter pastures in the lowlands and similarly brought back in the spring. Traditionally, extended families held the limited amount of agricultural land, the pastures, and the herds in common and did not have a strong sense of individual ownership. The Laks nevertheless resisted Soviet collectivization policies.

=== Kinship ===
Traditionally Laks, like most Dagestani highlanders, lived in patriarchal clan units (tukhums) consisting of a large extended family having a common ancestor, either recently deceased or still living. All members had the same patronymic and all property was owned mutually by the clan; decision making was the responsibility of either the elder patriarch or the elder males. Clan members were expected to provide mutual assistance in work and in family affairs, and to assume collective responsibility in vendettas, as prescribed by adat. The term for close family members within the tukhum is kk'ul, and they refer to each other as usursu (sibling). The importance of tukhums is today being eroded by modernization and continuing emigration.

=== Marriage ===
Marriages were traditionally arranged by the families of the couple, with the oldest women taking the most prominent role in the decision making. The bride and groom were most likely to be from the same clan. The custom of paying kalïm (bride-price) persists to a limited degree, but the transaction is more symbolic than financial.

=== Feudal system ===
The Laks are reported to have been the first Dagestani people to establish a feudal system. Their feudal society consisted of the khans; the bagtal (beks), who were the khan's family and the nobility; the chankri (children of marriages between beks and women of lower social orders); the uzdental (uzden), who were free peasants (numerically the largest of all classes); the rayat (serfs); and the laghart (slaves). This feudal system coexisted with a system of free societies, which were composed of the more democratic tukhums. These free societies were military and economic arrangements that were fluid in structure and worked on a democratic and voluntary basis. The laws governing the relations of groups within these free societies were codified in adat.

=== Language ===
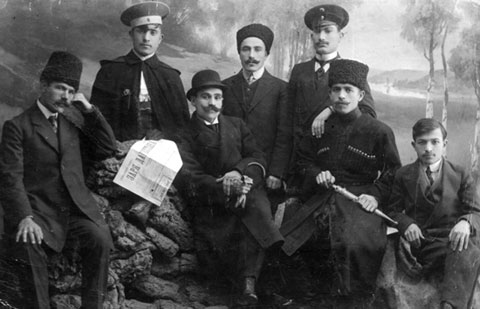
Said Gabiev (third from left) with subscribers to the Zarya Dagestan newspaper in Baku, c. 1913

The native language of all Laks is the Lak language. Lak is a member of the highly diverse Northeast Caucasian language family. Within the family, its position is highly debated, but it is generally thought to be an isolate, which either developed separately from an early point or, alternatively, a language of whose close relatives all have gone extinct.

Initially, Lak by lexicon was found to be close to Dargin and the two were often combined in one Lak–Dargin subgroup of Dagestani languages. However, further research has led linguists to conclude that this association was insufficient.

== Genetics ==
According to genetic studies in 2023, the following haplogroups are found to predominate among Laks:

- J1 (73%)
- R1b (10%)
- G2 (4%)

== Notable Laks ==
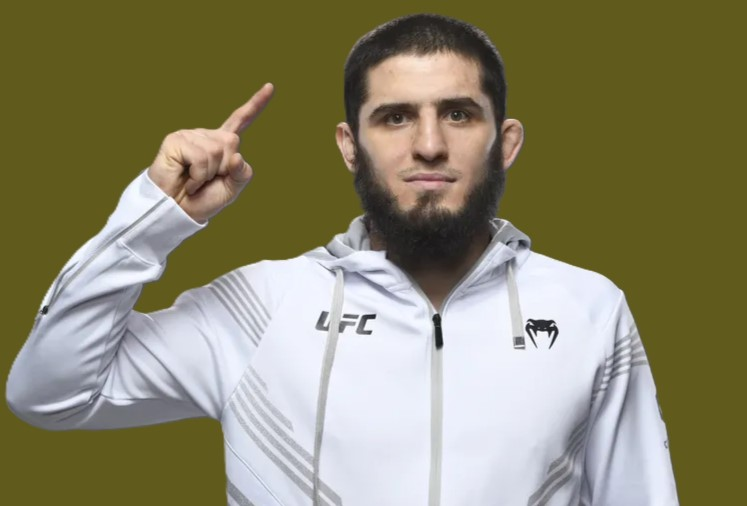
Islam Makhachev, Former UFC Lightweight Champion, Current UFC Welterweight Champion

- Islam Makhachev, mixed martial artist, former UFC lightweight champion, current UFC welterweight champion.
- Omari Akhmedov, professional mixed martial artist, current UFC and PFL fighter.
- Shirvani Muradov, Olympic wrestler, gold medalist at the 2008 Summer Olympics.
- Musa Manarov, former Soviet cosmonaut.
- Ibragim Ibragimov, a Russian freestyle wrestler world gold medalist.

== See also ==
- History of Lakia
