= Lak language =

Northeast Caucasian language

Lak
- лакку маз lakku maz لاکّو ماز
- Pronunciation: [lakːu maz]
- Native to: North Caucasus
- Region: Mountain Dagestan
- Ethnicity: Laks
- Native speakers: 152,050 (2010 census)
- Language family: Northeast Caucasian: Lak
- Writing system: Cyrillic (Lak alphabet); Latin (formerly); Arabic (formerly)

Official status
- Official language in: Russia: Dagestan

Language codes
- ISO 639-3: lbe
- Glottolog: lakk1252
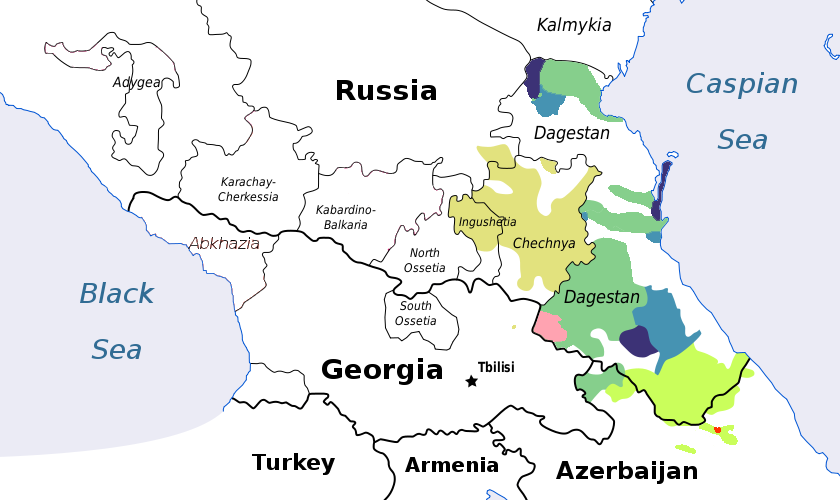
- Lak

- Lak is classified as Vulnerable by the UNESCO Atlas of the World's Languages in Danger.

Lak (лакку маз, [lakːu maz]) is a Northeast Caucasian language forming its own branch within the family. It is the language of the Lak people from the Russian autonomous republic of Dagestan, where it is one of six official languages. It is spoken by about 157,000 people.

== History ==
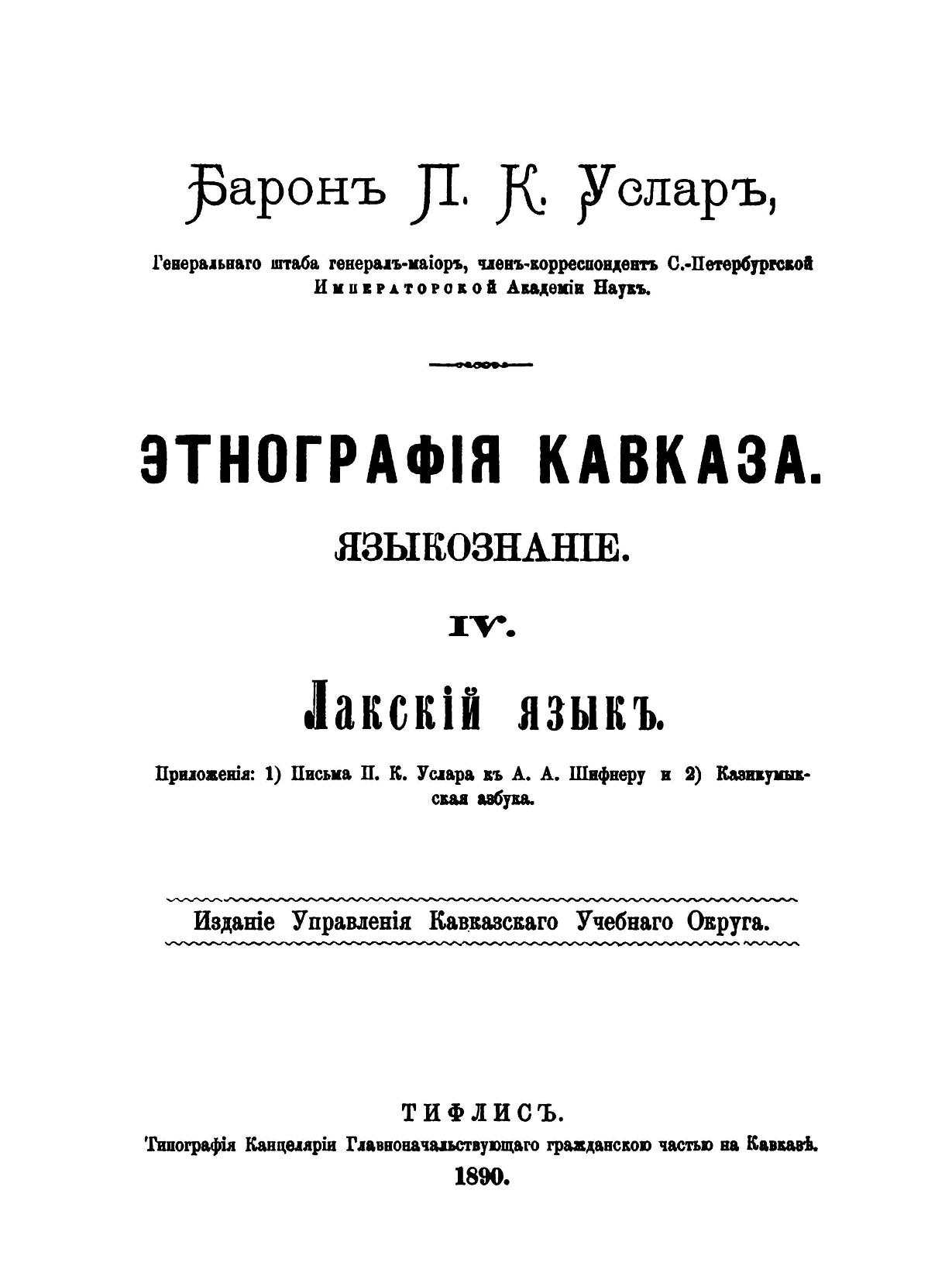
Cover page of the textbook on Lak grammar named "Лакскiй языкъ" or The Lak language compiled by P. K. Uslar in 1890

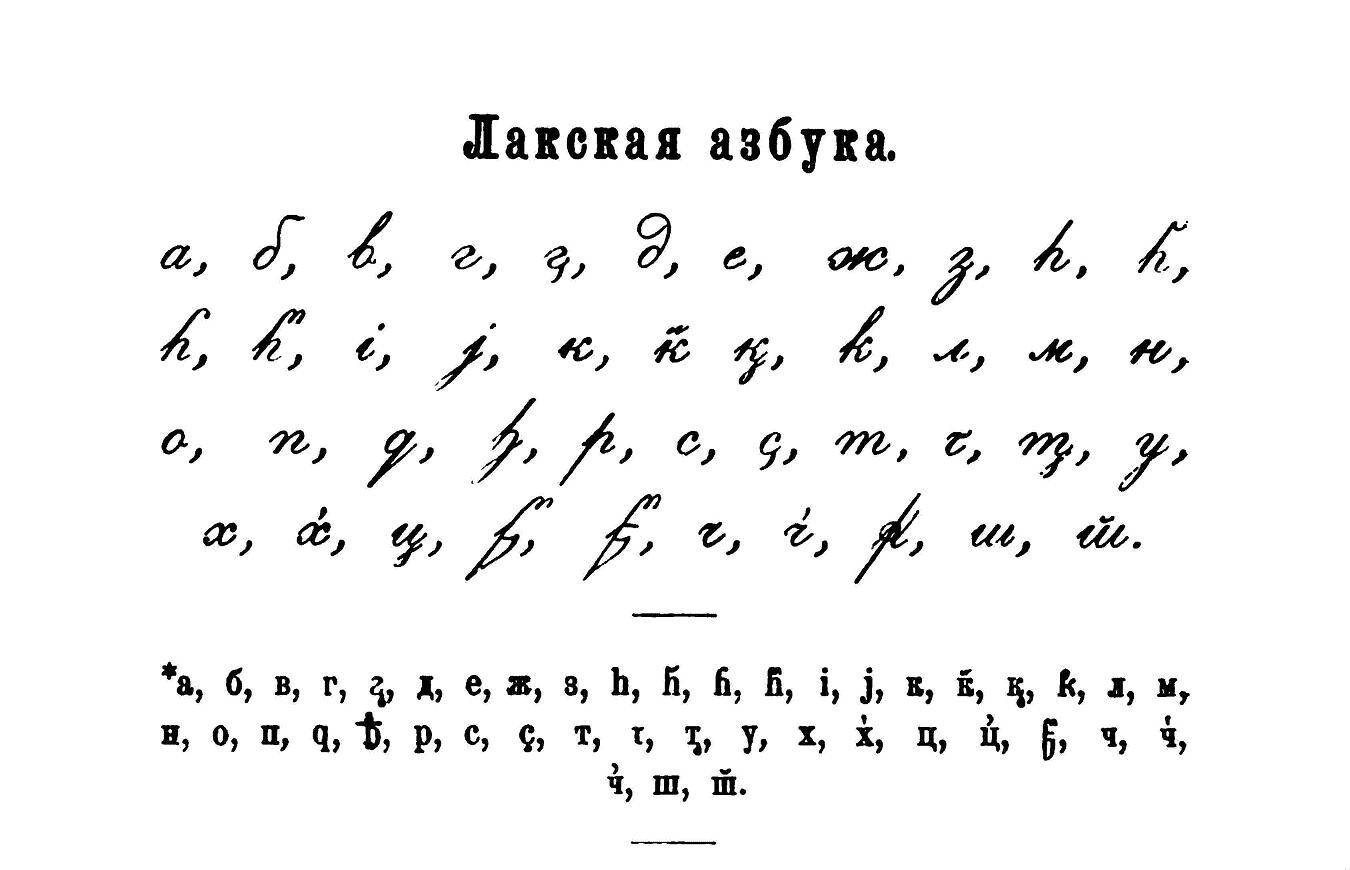
"Лакская азбука" or The Lak alphabet. Many called the language "Bak Tak" from Peter Uslar's Lak Grammar.

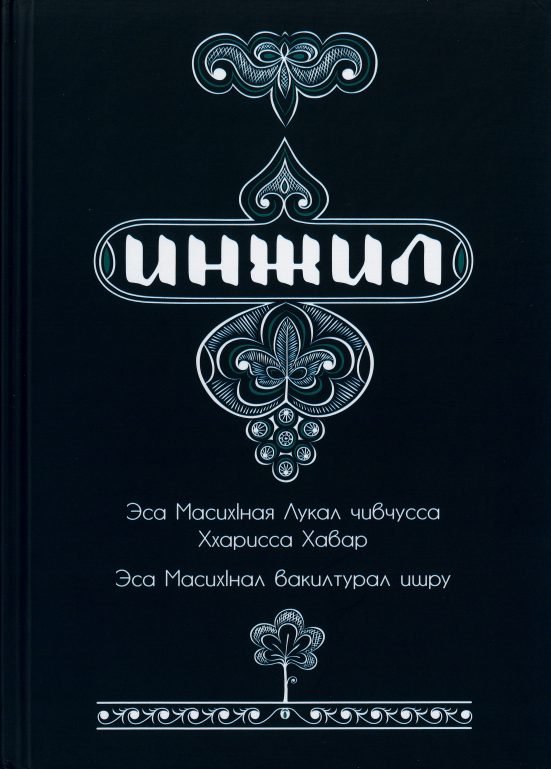
Gospel of Luke and Acts of the Apostles in Lak, 2019

In 1864, Russian ethnographer and linguist P. K. Uslar wrote: "Kazikumukh grammar or as I called it for short in the native language, the Lak grammar, Lakku maz, the Lak language, is ready".

In 1890, P. K. Uslar compiled a textbook on Lak grammar titled The Lak Language. It stated under the title "Lak alphabet": "The proposed alphabet is written for people who name themselves collectively Lak, genitive Lakral. From among these people each one is named separately Lakkuchu 'Lakian man', the woman – Lakkusharssa 'Lakian woman'. Their homeland they name Lakral kIanu – 'Lak place'."

Lak has throughout the centuries adopted a number of loanwords from Arabic, Turkish, Persian, and Russian. Ever since Dagestan was part of the Soviet Union and later Russia, the largest portion of loanwords have come from Russian, especially political and technical vocabulary. There is a newspaper and broadcasting station in Lak.

In accordance with the Constitution of the Republic of Dagestan of 1994, Lak was named as the state language along with Russian and some other major languages spoken in Dagestan (about 20 local languages are unwritten and have no official status). Lak is used as a teaching tool in elementary school and taught as a subject in secondary schools, vocational schools and universities. There is a Lak newspaper, Ilchi.

The standard Lak language is based on the dialect of the city of Kumukh. This city should not be confused with the Kumyk ethnic group, a Turkic people also present in the Caucasus. Lak has the following dialects: Kumukh, Vitskhi, Arakul, Balkhar, Shadni, Shalib, Vikhli, Kuli, and Kaya.

Initially Lak by lexicon was found to be close to Dargin and the two were often combined in one Lak–Dargin subgroup of Dagestani languages. However, further research has led linguists to conclude that this association was insufficient.

== Phonology ==
=== Consonants ===
Consonants
		Labial	Dental	Postalveolar		Velar		Uvular		Pharyngeal	Glottal
		Labial	Dental	plain	lab.	plain	lab.	plain	lab.	Pharyngeal	Glottal
Nasal		m	n								
Plosive	voiced	b	d			ɡ	ɡʷ			ʡ	
Plosive	voiceless lenis	p	t			k	kʷ	q	qʷ		ʔ (Note: The sound transcribed here as a glottal stop is named rather ambiguously a "glottalic laryngeal" by both sources.)
Plosive	voiceless fortis	pː	tː			kː	kʷː	qː	qʷː		
Plosive	ejective	pʼ	tʼ			kʼ	kʷʼ	qʼ	qʷʼ		
Affricate	voiceless lenis		t͡s	t͡ʃ	t͡ʃʷ						
Affricate	voiceless fortis		t͡sː	t͡ʃː	t͡ʃʷː						
Affricate	ejective		t͡sʼ	t͡ʃʼ	t͡ʃʷʼ						
Fricative	voiceless lenis		s	ʃ	ʃʷ	x	xʷ	χ	χʷ		h
Fricative	voiceless fortis		sː	ʃː	ʃʷː	xː	xʷː	χː	χʷː		
Fricative	voiced	v ~ w ~ β	z	ʒ	ʒʷ			ʁ	ʁʷ		
Trill			r							ʜ	
Approximant			l	j							

According to Catford (1977), some dialects have /t͡p᫇, d͡b̫, t͡p᫇ʼ/.

=== Vowels ===
Five vowels are presented as /i, e, a, o, u/. Three vowels /i, a, u/ are also pharyngealized as /iˤ, aˤ, uˤ/, and also have allophones of [e, æ, œ].

== Writing systems ==
The Lak language was written using the Arabic script until 1928. Afterwards it was written with a Latin alphabet for ten years, and since 1938 it has been written in Cyrillic.

The Lak alphabet in Cyrillic initially included 48 letters and later 54 letters with double letters as "тт", "пп", "чч", "хьхь", etc.:

А а	Аь аь	Б б	В в	Г г	Гъ гъ	Гь гь	Д д
Е е	Ё ё	Ж ж	З з	И и	Й й	К к	Къ къ
Кь кь	КӀ кӀ	Л л	М м	Н н	О о	Оь оь	П п
Пп пп	ПӀ пӀ	Р р	С с	Т т	ТӀ тӀ	У у	Ф ф
Х х	Хъ хъ	Хь хь	ХӀ хӀ	Ц ц	ЦӀ цӀ	Ч ч	ЧӀ чӀ
Ш ш	Щ щ	Ъ ъ	Ы ы	Ь ь	Э э	Ю ю	Я я

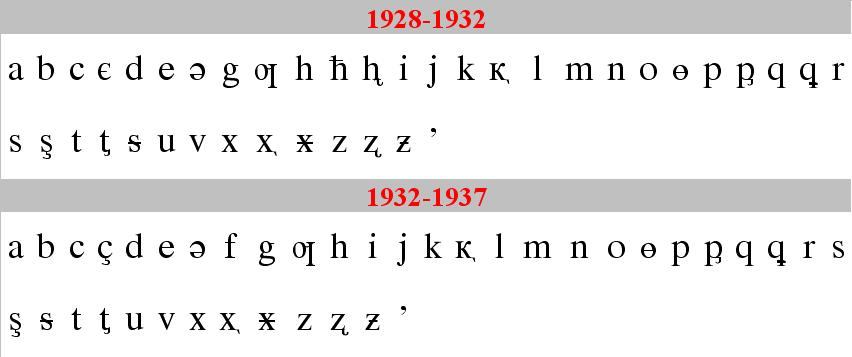
Obsolete Lak alphabets in Latin script

=== Writing Comparison Table ===
Compiled according to,

Cyrillic alphabet	Latin (1930s)	Perso-Arabic	IPA
А а	A a	آ	[a], [ə], [ɛ]
Аь аь	Ə ə	أ	[æ]~[ɛ]
Б б	B b	ب	[b]
В в	V v	و	[w]~[β]
Г г	G g	گ	[g]
Гъ гъ	Ƣ ƣ	غ	[ʁ]
Гь гь	H h	ھ	[h]
Д д	D d	د	[d]
Е е	e, Je je	اە	[je], [e]
Ё ё	Jo jo	-	[jo]
Ж ж	Ƶ ƶ	ژ، ج	[ʒ]
З з	Z z	ز	[z]
И и	I i	اى	[i], [y]
Й й	J j	ی	[j]
К к	K k	ک	[k]
Къ къ	Q q	ڠ	[qː]
Кк кк	Kk kk	کّ	[kː]
Кь кь	Ꝗ ꝗ	ق	[qʼ]
КӀ кӀ	Ⱪ ⱪ	ࢰ	[kʼ]
Л л	L l	ل	[l]
М м	M m	م	[m]
Н н	N n	ن	[n]
О о	O o	اؤ	[o]
Оь оь	Ɵ ɵ	اۊ	[oˤ]~[ø]
П п	P p	پ	[p]
Пп пп	Pp pp	پّ	[pː]
ПӀ пӀ	Ҏ ҏ	ڢ	[pʼ]
Р р	R r	ر	[r]
С с	S s	س	[s]
Сс сс	Ss ss	سّ	[sː]
Т т	T t	ت	[t]
Тт тт	Tt tt	تّ	[tː]
ТӀ тӀ	T̨ t̨	ط	[tʼ]
У у	U u	او	[u], [y]
Ф ф	F f	ف	[f]
Х х	X x	خ	[χ]
Хх хх	Xx xx	خّ	[χː]
Хъ хъ	Ӿ ӿ	څ	[q]
Хь хь	Ҳ ҳ	ؼ	[x]
Хьхь хьхь	Ҳҳ ҳҳ	ؼّ	[xː]
ХӀ хӀ	ħ	ح	[ħ]
Ц ц	Ꞩ ꞩ	ڝ	[ʦ]
Цц цц	Ꞩꞩ ꞩꞩ	ڝّ	[ʦː]
ЦӀ цӀ	Ⱬ ⱬ	ڗ	[ʦʼ]
Ч ч	C c	چ	[ʧ]
Чч чч	Cc cc	چّ	[ʧː]
ЧӀ чӀ	Ç ç	ڃ	[ʧʼ]
Ш ш	Ş ş	ش	[ʃ]
Щ щ	Şc şc	شّ	[ʃʷ]
Ъ ъ	’	ئ	[ʔ]
Ы ы	-	-	
Ь ь	-	-	
Э э	E e	اە	[e]
Ю ю	Ju ju, Ɵ ɵ	اۊ	[ju], [y]
Я я	Ja ja, Ə ə	أ	[ja], [æ]
-	ⱨ	ع	
-	Ꞓ ꞓ	ڃ	

Perso-Arabic	Cyrillic	Latin	IPA
آ / ـا	А а	A a	[a], [ə], [ɛ]
أ	Аь аь	Ə ə	[æ]~[ɛ]
ب	Б б	B b	[b]
ت	Т т	T t	[t]
تّ	Тт тт	Tt tt	[t:]
ث	С с	S s	[s]
پ	П п	P p	[p]
پّ	Пп пп	Pp pp	[p:]
ج	Ж ж	Ƶ ƶ	[ʒ]
ح	ХӀ хӀ	Ħ ħ	[ħ]
خ	Х х	X x	[χ]
خّ	Хх хх	Xx xx	[χ:]
څ	Хъ хъ	Ӿ ӿ	[q]
چ	Ч ч	C c	[ʧ]
چّ	Чч чч	Cc cc	[ʧ:]
ڃ	ЧӀ чӀ	Ç ç	[ʧʼ]
د	Д д	D d	[d]
ذ	З з	Z z	[z]
ر	Р р	R r	[r]
ز	З з	Z z	[z]
ڗ	ЦӀ цӀ	Ⱬ ⱬ	[ʦʼ]
ژ	Ж ж	Ƶ ƶ	[ʒ]
س	С с	S s	[s]
سّ	Сс сс	Ss ss	[s:]
ش	Ш ш	Ş ş	[ʃ]
شّ	Щ щ	Şc şc	[ʃʷ]
ص	С с	S s	[s]
ض	З з	Z z	[z]
ڝ	Ц ц	Ꞩ ꞩ	[ʦ]
ڝّ	Цц цц	Ꞩꞩ ꞩꞩ	[ʦ:]
ط	ТӀ тӀ	T̨ t̨	[tʼ]
ظ	З з	Z z	[z]
ع	Ъ ъ	’	[ʔ]
غ	Гъ гъ	Ƣ ƣ	[ʁ]
ڠ	Къ къ	Q q	[qː]
ف	Ф ф	F f	[f]
ڢ	ПӀ пӀ	Ҏ ҏ	[pʼ]
ق	Кь кь	Ꝗ ꝗ	[qʼ]
ک	К к	K k	[k]
کّ	Кк кк	Kk kk	[k:]
گ	Г г	G g	[g]
ࢰ	КӀ кӀ	Ⱪ ⱪ	[kʼ]
ؼ	Хь хь	Ҳ ҳ	[x]
ؼّ	Хьхь хьхь	Ҳҳ ҳҳ	[x:]
ل	Л л	L l	[l]
م	М м	M m	[m]
ن	Н н	N n	[n]
و	В в	V v	[w]~[β]
اؤ / ؤ	О о	O o	[o]
اۊ / ۊ	Оь оь	Ɵ ɵ	[oˤ]~[ø]
او / و	У у	U u	[u], [y]
ھ	Гь гь	H h	[h]
اە / ە	Е е Э э	E e	[e]
ی	Й й	J j	[j]
ای / ی	И и	I i	[i], [y]
ئ	Ъ ъ	’	[ʔ]

== Grammar ==
Lak is an ergative-absolutive language with a rich case inventory. The basic case forms are:

Absolutive	-Ø
Genitive/Ergative/Instrumental	-l
Dative	-n
General Ablative	-š:a
Comitative	-š:al
Instrumental, Causal	-ynu
Comparative	-yar
Possessive/Adessive	-(a)x
General Allative	-x:un
Circumessive	-xlu

Lak is one of the few North East Caucasian languages with verbal agreement for person. It generally only distinguishes between speech-act participants and non-speech-act participants. In other words, the first- and second-person agreement markers are the same.

	Singular	Plural
1,2	-ra	-ru
3	-r / -ri / -∅	

The free pronouns of Lak do distinguish first and second person.

	Singular		Plural
	Absolutive	Oblique	
1	na	tːu-	žu(-)
2	ina	wi-	zu(-)
