= Surkhay II =

18th-century Lak ruler

Khan of Gazikumukh
- Reign: 1789–1820
- Predecessor: Muhammad Khan
- Successor: Aslan Khan
- Born: 1744; Kumukh, Gazikumukh Khanate
- Died: 5 September 1826 or 1827 (aged 82–83); Sogratl, Avar Khanate
- Wars and battles: Siege of Derbent; Russian conquest of the Caucasus; Caucasian War; Russo-Persian War (1826–1828)
- Father: Muhammad Khan
- Mother: Ustajlu lady

Surkhay Khan Kun-Butta (Lak: Сурхай-хан Хъунбутта, lit. 'Grand Father') or erroneously Khanbutai, Khon-Butai, Khomutai was an 18th-century Lak military leader as well as last independent Gazikumukh Khan.

== Background ==
He was born in 1744, probably in Kumukh to Muhammad Khan of Gazikumukh and his Azerbaijani wife from Ustajlu tribe. Not much is known about his early life. According to Abbasgulu Bakikhanov, his mother was taken captive during his father's siege of Shabran. Abdullah khan Ustajlu, commander of the garrison of city was killed during the raid. Surkhay was born a year after the campaign and named after his grandfather Surkhay I. He had a half brother named Shaykh Mardan bek, who detested Surkhay because of their father's love towards him, as his mother was not from a noble family.

== Reign ==
He succeeded after his father's death in 1789, which coincided his father's foe Fatali Khan's death. Being a 35-year-old experienced statesman, he wanted to exploit his new neighbours' weaknesses. His half-brother Shaykh Mardan bek, was given by Fatali Khan a part of a Kura district up to Kabirek, which earlier belonged to Derbent Khanate, and revenues of Guney district that belonged Quba in 1776. Shaykh Mardan's death – which according to Russian historian Komarov, happened not later than Fatali's – was perfect ground for Surkhay to invade Kura plain and depose his minor nephews. Annexing these lands, he moved on to invade Rutul Federation, capturing Lezgi villages of Kaka, Lutkun and Yalak villages, appointing his brothers Shuayb and Isa as their beys. Moving on, he captured the Aghul village of Burkikhan, appointing his another brother (or cousin, according to some) Said bek as its ruler.

He forged an alliance with Mustafa Khan of Shirvan in 1792 to invade Shaki Khanate and divide it between themselves. As part of the deal, Mustafa moved to Goychay, and Surkhay invaded Khachmaz and Qabala mahals of the Khanate. In addition to this, Shihabuddin, the Sultan of Arash, also rebelled against ruling Muhammad Hasan Khan with support from Karabakh Khanate. However, Muhammad Hasan managed to defeat them with mercenaries.

In 1794, supporting Salim Khan, he again attacked Shaki Khanate while Muhammad Hasan was taken by Qajars as hostage. However, Salim executed 7 underage sons of Muhammad Hasan, including Shaykh Ali Khan of Quba's nephews. Hearing the news, Shaykh Ali marched on Shaki and Surkhay decided to retreat. He again attacked Shaykh Ali Khan's domains in Quba and captured his maternal village of Zeykhur. Left with 300 people to defend, he was victorious. However thanks to the intervention of utsmi Ali Bek and qadi of Tabasaran sides signed a truce in the village of Koysu. Later in 1796, he supported Shaykh Ali khan against Russian Empire during the Siege of Derbent. According to contemporary Russian military historian Nikolai Dubrovin, there were 400 Gazikumukh cavalry inside Derbent to defend the city.

After surrender of the town on 21 May 1796, Shaykh Ali however managed to escape to near Gilgilçay, reached Kumukh asked for troops from Surkhay II to retake Quba. Shaykh Ali and 10,000 strong Gazikumukh armies were defeated by Russian detachment sent under general Sergei Bulgakov. As a result of disastrous battle near Alpan, 1600 Dagestanis died, including Surkhay's son Bayram, as well as councillor Molla Taghi.

=== Campaigns in Quba and Derbent ===
3 years later in 1799, Surkhay, using Shaykh Ali's illness, sent an army under his son Nuh bek to Quba, who claimed to be Hasan Khan, Fatali's youngest son returning from exile. Meanwhile himself camped near Qullar and kept the khanate under control for a month and half. Shaykh Ali khan managed to expel his armies only after support of 10,000 soldiers from Akusha-Dargo Union and Shamkhalate of Tarki and routed him till Chirag. During the campaign Shaykh Ali had to raise additional taxes from population and had to force peasant to host at least one mercenary. Derbent people, which hosted 2,000 soldiers soon rebelled but was put down thanks to efforts of Mirza Muhammad II. This rebellion was followed by a famine when the inhabitants had to fight off 400 carts en route from Tarki to Quba bringing food and supplies to capital, accusing khan of debauchery and only thinking for himself. Soon inhabitants started another rebellion under Sultan beg Bayat and forced Shaykh Ali's governor Muhammad Husayn beg Bayat out of the city. As a middle ground, Shaykh Ali accepted his half-sister and Mirza Muhammad's wife Khanbika khanum as hakem of Derbent and Sultan as her deputy. Surkhay saw the rebellion as opportunity and in May 1800, he deposed Khanbika together with Tabasaran ghazi and Kaitag Utsmi and installed Hasan Khan as the new Derbent Khan. Although Shaykh Ali, still ill, later besieged Derbent for 12 days and had few skirmishes to regain the city, nothing came out of it.

Surkhay II soon heard rumours of still ill Shaykh Ali's death and decided to attack Quba and install his puppet Hasan as khan there. Arriving at Zizik, he was persuaded to lay down his arms by Zibunnisa, wife of Shaykh Ali. Using opportunity Shaykh Ali raided Derbent Khanate and forcibly moved population of 9 villages to Quba, depriving Surkhay's puppet Hasan of his tax income. At last on 9 September [O.S. 28 August] 1800, two brothers signed a truce, acknowledging each other as khans of their respective states. Shaykh Ali again became khan of Derbent upon his brother's death in 1803 of chickenpox.

=== Struggle against Russians ===
After annexation of Derbent and Quba Khanates in 1806, Russians sent demands towards Surkhay to submit and pay tribute. Surkhay however, claimed tributes were higher than he expected and refused it. Approached by new Russian viceroy Alexander Tormasov later, he expressed allegiance, but secretly aided Shaykh Ali Khan of Quba in his guerilla warfare.

He attacked Jafar Qoli Khan Donboli in 1808, who was the new khan of Shaki installed by Russians 2 years ago. Camping near Jalayir village, he brought 12,000 Gazikumukh soldiers, 1,500 Dzhengutai Kumyks under Ali Sultan, 1,000 soldiers from Akusha-Dargo Union, 3,000 Avars, 2,000 soldiers from Jar-Balakan and 500 Kaitags. His army included the blind Muhammad Hasan, as well as Qasim Khan of Shirvan and Surkhay's sons Nuh, Khalid, Zakariyya and Murtuzali. However, he was defeated after 2 hours of battle.

In September 1809, a congress was held in the domains of Surkhay, at which Shaykh Ali and Akushan elders were also present. As a result, they decided to attack Quba in 10 days. Attack was success as Russians reported in August 1810 that the inhabitants of Quba and the local beys had gone over to side of Khan. Nevertheless, the khan was defeated again and retreated to Yersi.

Shaykh Ali later had to face new Russian contingent sent against him by Filippo Paulucci under major-general Nikolai Khotuntsov. Sides met near village of Rustov on 3 December [O.S. 21 November] 1811. Shaykh Ali had 7,000 under his command, being aided by Surkhay II's son Nuh bek, Aslan Khan of Dzhengutay and Qadi Abubekr of Akusha-Dargo. Khotuntsov attacked the village from three sides and, after a 4-hour stubborn battle, drove out Shaykh Ali to Akhty, captured many prisoners, recaptured 30 banners and more than 350 horses. Surkhay on the other hand arrived in Kurakh to greet his wounded son.

Hearing of Khotuntsov's arrival in his territory, he was defeated by Russians on 22 December [O.S. 10 November] 1811 near Shimikhyur and next day near Tatarkhankent. Soon Khotuntsov arrived on 27 December in the strongly fortified village of Kurakh to demand Shaykh Ali from Surkhay II. Surkhay in return demanded his nephew Aslan bek's return. Russians not wanting to give up their ally, stormed the village and defeated Gazikumukh forces. However, couldn't manage to follow fleeing Surkhay as heavy snow fell around environs. As a result, Aslan bek became the ruler of newly created Kura Khanate officially on 16 January [O.S. 4 January] 1812.

=== Struggle against Kura ===
Surkhay on the other hand, returned to Kumukh started to send his sons to Kura Khanate, agitating denizens of Richa and Chirag to rise against the Russians. Aslan Khan, trying to punish his uncle, started a raid against Gazikumukh in March 1812, however he faced a strong resistance near Khosrekh and forced to retreat after losing several soldiers. Later in June 1812, Surkhay sent his son Murtuzali to Khotuntsov, offering to submit in hopes of reinforcing his army for next year.

Just like he planned, he marched on Kurakh in May 1813 but met a crushing defeat near Gelkhen. Surkhay to gain support of Qajar Iran, fled to Tabriz with his 20 closest relatives, put his son Murtuzali in charge. Aslan Khan, using the opportunity captured Gazikumukh in 1814 and Murtuzali who, was also brother of Aslan Khan on mother's side, was forced to submit. This move coincided with Surkhay Khan's return to Gazikumukh, who left Tabriz on 13 August [O.S. 1 August] 1814 with 120 followers, who lost his hope after Treaty of Gulistan. Surkhay was ambushed in Elisavetpol Governorate, lost 35 men including his son Zakariyya. His grandson Hatam beg was taken captive along 10 people. He managed to flee through domains of his in-law Ahmad Khan, Sultan of Elisu, arriving at Khosrekh. However, he was defeated by Aslan Khan in his first skirmish. Hearing the news of his father's arrival, Murtuzali killed Fathali bek – his cousin and Aslan Khan's half-brother – and sent his head to Surkhay secretly, demonstrating his loyalty. Surkhay victoriously arrived in Gazikumukh, while Aslan fled back to Kura Khanate with his wife Ummu Gulsum.

== End of reign ==
Nuh bey and Murtuzali beg, sons of elderly Surkhay, who was 71 at this point, soon started to rivalling each other about succession. Former demanded his father to secure release of his own son, while latter grew popular thanks to being instrumental in returning his father to power. Surkhay in his turn sent several letters to Nikolay Rtischev, new viceroy in Caucasus, to obtain his grandson's release in return of extradition of Prince Alexander of Georgia. Not receiving any response, Surkhay invaded Kura Khanate again in August 1815 and defeated the Russian garrison stationed there.

Soon Surkhay decided to get rid of Murtuzali, who was constantly growing his power and popularity. He ordered Muhammad beg (another son of Nuh beg) and his nephew Harun beg (son of Isa bey) to murder Murtuzali. He send his other son Jafar beg as hostage to Tiflis to obtain release of Hatam beg again and promised submission to Russian Empire. This request was accepted and Surkhay swore fealty of allegiance to Russian Empire again. Nevertheless, he continued to support other Dagestani rulers aspiring for independence, including Sultan Ahmad khan of Avars, Adil Khan of Kaitag Utsmiate, Adil Girai of Kumyks and Shaykh Ali Khan of Quba. New Russian viceroy Yermolov however, was already suspicious of him. Surkhay's real motives showed himself when alliance of Dagestani rulers attacked Yermolov's subordinate Pestel near Bashlykent on 23 October 1818. The allied 20,000 strong army was commanded by Sultan Ahmad Khan of Avars, his brother Hasan Khan of Mehtuli, Muhammad Qadi of Akusha-Dargo Union, Surkhay II with his sons, Shaikh Ali Khan and his brother-in-law Qadi Abdullah of Tabasaran. Shaykh Ali and Abdullah left the alliance for Quba on the 4th day of siege, reportedly after searching for the corpses of Russian soldiers and cutting off ears and hands, having collected a whole bag of them to turn over to Abbas Mirza in return of monetary support to gather more armies.

This humiliating defeat drew fatal response from Yermolov who invaded Mehtuli Khanate in 1819 with 5 battalions, 300 cossacks and 14 guns. Avar Khanate fell in September and Kaitag Utsmiate was invaded by Valerian Madatov's army in October. Yermolov defeated Akusha-Dargo Union on 12 January [O.S. 31 December] 1819. Surkhay, meanwhile, gathered 20,000 troops. Yermolov pre-emptively declared Surkhay deposed and appointed his nephew Aslan Khan on his place on 31 January [O.S. 19 January] 1820. However, Surkhay was only defeated by Madatov in June 1820 who installed Aslan Khan in his place on 1 August. Juan Van Halen, having participated in the campaign, wrote detailed accounts of the battles involving Surkhay in his memoirs.

Surkhay later fled to Qajar Iran thanks to help from his son-in-law Mustafa Khan of Shirvan same year.

Surkhay returned with Abbas Mirza to Caucasus during Russo-Persian War of 1826–1828 and made it to Sogratl and sent his son Nuh beg to Constantinople to get help from Ottoman Empire. However, he died in 1827 (according to another document, he died on 5 September 1826 (Hijri 3 Safar 1342) and was buried in Sogratl at the age of 83. Nuh bey died in Ottoman lands next year.

== Personality ==
According to Russian author Komarov, "he was of great stature, had a formidable look, especially in old age, was distinguished by great learning, in a Muslim spirit, and was famous as an impartial and fair judge."

== Family ==
He had two wives:

- A Lak woman
  - Nuh beg (d. 1828)
  - Khalid
  - Zakariyya (d. 1814)
  - Jafar beg
  - Pakhay Bike (d. 1847) — married Mustafa Khan of Shirvan in 1814
- An Avar woman, sister of Umma Khan, widow of his brother Shaykh Mardan.
  - Murtuzali (d. 1815)
  - Tuti Bike – married Ahmad Khan of Elisu
    - Daniyal Sultan — Sultan of Elisu (1831–1844)
- Unknown woman
  - A daughter betrothed to Aslan Khan of Kura Khanate
  - Pirdovs, married to Abdulfattah bey, a great-grandson of Cholak Surkhay
  - Bayram (d. 1796)

According to Semyon Mazarovich, Russian chargé d'affaires to Iran, he had at least 55 living descendants by 1821. Estate and land commission in 1867 in different villages of the Gazikumukh Okrug (Kumukh, Khalapkhi, Duchi, Begeklyu, Para, Marki, Tsuschar, Kuli) identified and recognized 48 descendants of Surkhay, who were endowed by the imperial administration.

== Sources ==
- Alkadari, Mirza Hasan (1929). Асари Дагестан (Исторические сведения о Дагестане) (PDF) (in Russian). Translated by Hasanov, Ali. Makhachkala.
- Bournoutian, George (2021). From the Kur to the Aras: A Military History of Russia's Move into the South Caucasus and the First Russo-Iranian War, 1801–1813. Brill. ISBN 978-9004445154.
- Dubrovin, Nikolai (1886). История войны и владычества русских на Кавказе [The history of the war and domination of Russians in the Caucasus] (in Russian). Saint Petersburg.
- Hajiev, Vladlen (1967). Danialov, Hajiali (ed.). История Дагестана [History of Dagestan] (PDF) (in Russian). Vol. 1. Moscow: Nauka.
- Komarov, A. (1869). "Казикумухские и кюринские ханы" [Gazikumukh and Kura khans]. Сборник сведений о кавказских горцах [Collection of information about the Caucasian highlanders] (in Russian). Vol. 2. Tiflis. ISBN 9785446077120.
- Kosven, Mark (1958). История, география и этнография Дагестана XVIII – XIX вв [History, geography and ethnography of Dagestan 18–19th-centuries] (PDF) (in Russian). Moscow.
- Magomedov, Rasul (1999). Даргинцы в дагестанском историческом процессе [Dargins in the Dagestani historical process] (in Russian). Makhachkala: Dagestan book publishing house. ISBN 5-297-00577-9.
- Mustafazade, Tofig (2005). Quba xanlığı [Khanate of Quba] (in Azerbaijani). Baku: Elm. ISBN 5-8066-1747-5.
