= Aslan ibn Shahmardan =

Khan of Kura
- Reign: 1812 — 1836
- Predecessor: Khanate established
- Successor: Harun bek

Khan of Gazikumukh
- Reign: 12 July 1820 — 1836
- Predecessor: Surkhay II
- Successor: Muhammad Mirza Khan
- Born: 1781; Kumukh, Gazikumukh Khanate
- Died: 1836 (aged 54–55); Kumukh, Gazikumukh Khanate
- Spouse: Ummu Kulsum-beke
- Issue: Nutsal Agha khan Muhammad Mirza Khan
- Dynasty: Shamkhals
- Father: Shahmardan
- Religion: Sunni Islam

Aslan-Hussein Khan I or Aslan ibn Shahmardan (1781—1836) was the khan (governor) of the Gazikumukh (Kura) Khanate from 1820 to 1836 and the khan of the Avar Khanate from 1827 to 1828.

== Biography ==
=== Early years ===
He was born in 1781 in Kumukh to Shahmardan (Shaykh Mardan) bek, second son of Muhammad Khan of Gazikumukh; who detested his half-brother Surkhay because of their father's love towards him, as his mother was not from a noble family. Fatali Khan of Quba used this rivalry between brothers, granting Shaykh Mardan a part of a Kura district up to Kabirek, which earlier belonged to Derbent Khanate, and revenues of Guney district that belonged Quba in 1776.

Shaykh Mardan's death - which according to Russian historian Komarov, happened not later than Fatali's - was perfect ground for Surkhay to invade Kura plain and depose his minor nephews. As a result, Aslan fled to Iran and from there he moved to the Ottoman Empire. For some time he was in the service of the pasha of the eyalet of Childir.

In 1803, Aslan Khan began secret negotiations with the Russian commander Ivan Gudovich about accepting citizenship of the Russian Empire in exchange for the return of property and his possessions to Kurakh. In 1809 he arrived at V. Repin, the commandant of Baku. In the same year, together with the Russians he took part in a military campaign in southern Dagestan, where he defeated his cousin Nuh-bey.

However, during 1812 there were border skirmishes with the sons of Surkhay II. At the same time, Aslan's brothers Hasan-aga and Fatali-aga managed to escape from Gazikumukh to Kurakh.

=== Relations with the Russian Empire ===
According to Peter von Uslar, in 1812 the Caucasian administration formed the Kyra Khanate in south Dagestan, which united the territory of Kura, with the southern Gazikumukh possession – Kurakh, which became the capital of the khanate. Aslan Khan, Surkhay's nephew, was placed at the head, and was immediately promoted to colonel.

Surkhay II was declared deposed on January 19, 1820, due to anti-government activities. On June 12, 1820, near the village of Khozrekh, he was defeated and retreated to Gazikumukh, at that time Aslan occupied the village of Kuli, trying to block the path of his uncle, who first went to Avaria and then fled to Iran. On June 14, Russian troops entered Gazikumukh.

Aslan Khan was entrusted to manage Kumukh and also inherited Kura, which was restored by the Russians into an independent khanate. In 1826, Surkhay II returned from Iran to Andalal, the northern part of the Gazikumukh possession, and died in 1827 in the village of Sogratl.

Then Aslan Khan was approved as ruler of Gazikumukh by the Russian government. The commander of the Russian detachment of Aleksey Yermolov – Valerian Madatov announced the granting of the rank of major general to Aslan Khan, handed him an imperial charter, a banner with the Russian coat of arms, a precious saber and the Order of St. George of the 4th class – "For distinction in the conquest of Tabasaran, Kaitag and Gazikumukh."

At the same time, the increase in the tax burden and additional payments on the Russian troops and administration stationed in Dagestan gradually set the population up for resistance. With this in mind, the Khan began to pursue an anti-Russian policy: he supported the emergence of Muridism in his lands, and was the patron of Sheikh Muhammad Kurawi. Aslan Khan even forbade the movement of Russian troops several times through Kurakh and Gazi-Kumukh, which led to the ruin of the local population. Nevertheless, in 1831 he assisted the Russians in the fight against Imam Gazi-Muhammad.

== Death and succession ==
He died in 1836 and the Caucasus Viceroyalty handed over the reins of government in Gazikumukh to his son Muhammad Mirza khan, however the rule in Kura was given to Harun bek, the nephew of Aslan-khan, the son of his brother Tahir-bek. His wife Ummu Kulsum-beke later ruled Gazikumukh on her own right from 1838 to 1841.

== Awards ==
- Order of St. George - 4th class
- Medal "For Loyalty and Courage"

== See also ==
- Surkhay II
- Sultan Ahmed Khan I
- Gazikumukh Khanate
- Avar Khanate

== Sources ==
- Komarov, A. (1869). "Казикумухские и кюринские ханы" [Gazikumukh and Kura khans]. Сборник сведений о кавказских горцах [Collection of information about the Caucasian highlanders] (in Russian). Vol. 2. Tiflis. ISBN 9785446077120.
- Kurbanov, Ahmed (2009). The activities of Aslan-bey Kurinsky in the context of the political history of Russia in the Caucasus (late 18th – early 19th century) // Herzen University – No. 89.
- Potto, Vasily (2017). Caucasian war. The time of Paskevich or the rebellion of Chechnya. Vol. 5. Litres. ISBN 978-5-4250-8101-8
- Dubrovin, Nikolay (2022). History of war and domination of Russians in the Caucasus. Appointment of Aleksey Yermolov as viceroy in the Caucasus. Vol. 6. Litres. ISBN 978-5-04-153922-1
- Gadzhiev, Bulach (2022). Царские и шамилевские крепости в Дагестане. Litres. ISBN 978-5-457-67538-4
- Hajiev, Vladlen (1967). Danialov, Hajiali (ed.). История Дагестана [History of Dagestan] (PDF) (in Russian). Vol. 1. Moscow: Nauka.
