= Vikhli =

Vikhli Вихли Вихьул
- Selo
- Location within Republic of Dagestan Location within Russia
- Coordinates: 42°07′N 47°13′E
- Country: Russia
- Region: Republic of Dagestan
- District: Kulinsky District
- Time zone: UTC+3:00

Vikhli (Russian: Вихли; Lak: Вихьул) is a rural locality (a selo) and the administrative centre of Vikhlinsky Selsoviet, Kulinsky District, Republic of Dagestan, Russia. The population was 1,285 as of 2010. There are 13 streets.

== Geography ==
Vikhli is located 10 km northeast of Vachi (the district's administrative centre) by road. Kaya and Tsyysha are the nearest rural localities.

== Nationalities ==
Laks live there.
