= Juan Van Halen =

Spanish military officer

Juan Van Halen y Sartí
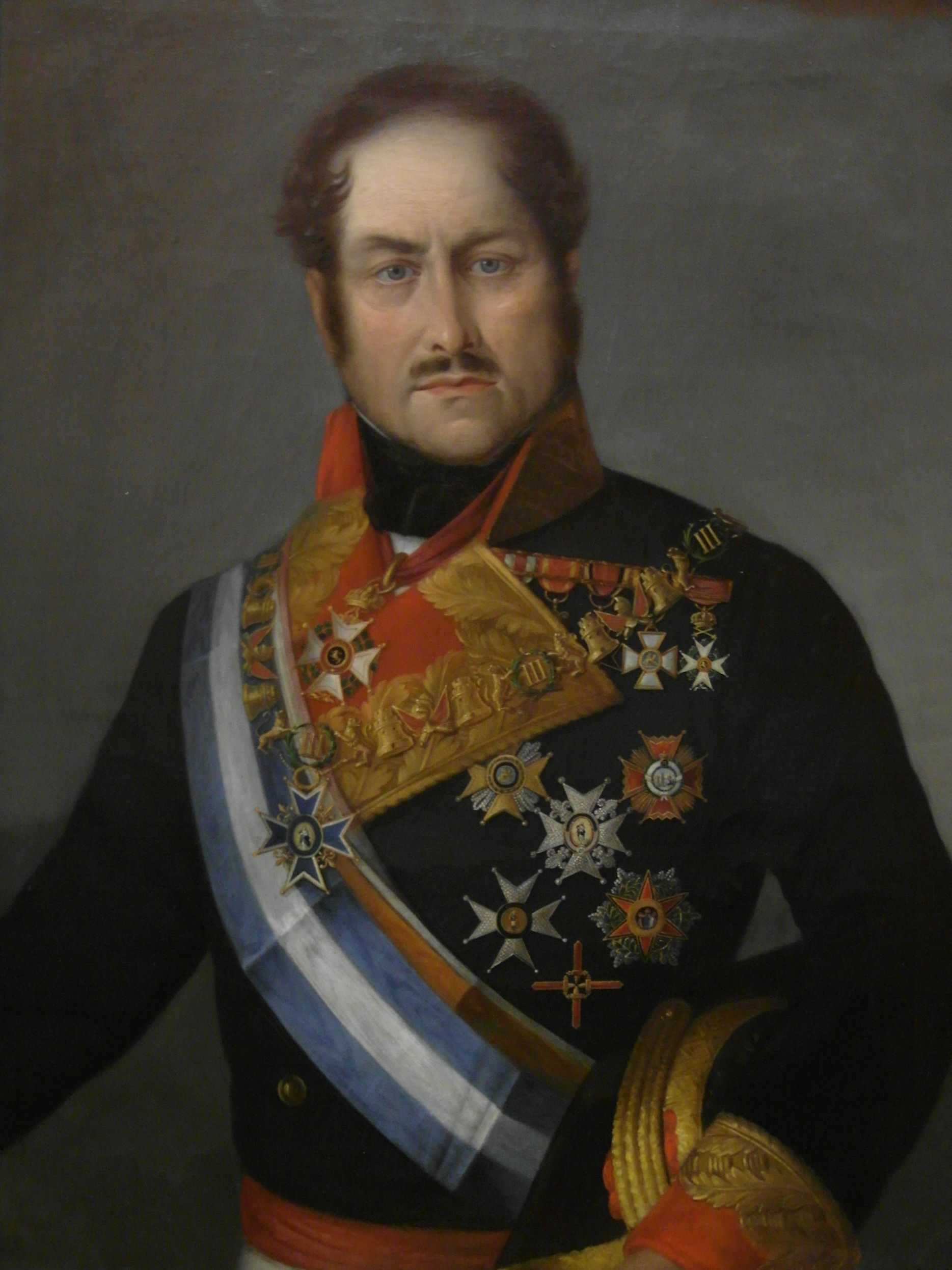
- Van Halen in c. 1853
- Born: 16 February 1788; Isla de León, Cádiz
- Died: 8 November 1864 (aged 76)
- Occupation: Military officer

Juan Van Halen y Sartí (16 February 1788 – 8 November 1864) was a Spanish military officer and Russian military officer of Flemish origin. After fighting for the losing side in the Peninsular War, he was forced to flee Spain. Van Halen became a military adventurer throughout Europe and served 18 months as a colonel in the Russian Caucasus Dragoon Regiment until he was removed by Tsar Alexander I of Russia.

== Early career ==
Van Halen was born in Isla de León, Cádiz, into a family of sailing merchants who had settled there.

He studied at the School of Nobles and the School of Pages of His Majesty; classmates in 1800 include the high liberal and French officers Francisco and Mariano de Unzaga Saint Maxent, with José María Torrijos or with the Count of Montijo. Between 1800 and 1803, Van Halen was a guardian marine of the Navy School in Cádiz.

In 1803, he left Cádiz as a Spanish Navy cadet on the frigate Anfitrite headed for Havana, Cuba, and Veracruz, Mexico. In 1807 Van Halen was employed in the admiralty office in Madrid. He was still employed at this post during Napoleon's invasion the next year. He was wounded during the Battle of Madrid and joined thereafter the army of Galicia with General Blake. After the Battle of Corunna in January 1809, he took refuge in Ferrol. Marshal Soult obliged the few troops in Ferrol to capitulate, after which Van Halen took an oath of submission to King Joseph Bonaparte. He remained in service to the French king of Spain, later assisting him during his retreat to France in 1813.

In 1814, Van Halen defected to the opposing army. By forging the signature of Marshal Louis-Gabriel Suchet, French commanders were advised to surrender various fortresses because the documents claimed that the war was over. Fooled by the trick, the 1,900 strong French garrisons of Lleida, Mequinenza and Monzón marched out and laid down their arms in surrender. However, Louis Benoît Robert, the commander at Tortosa, was not fooled by the forged documents and continued to resist.

When Captain Van Halen returned to Spain in 1815, he was investigated for his involvement in the Spanish War of Independence, first in Murcia, then in Madrid. As a result of his connections with a Masonic Lodge in Granada, he was imprisoned on 21 March 1817. Van Halen also had ties to General José María de Torrijos y Uriarte, who was later executed by a firing squad.

== Adventurer ==
Escaping from imprisonment, Van Halen traveled to Saint Petersburg, Russian Empire, in the beginning of 1819. He met with various Russian dignitaries, including Prince Pyotr Mikhailovich Volkonsky, close advisor to Tsar Alexander I and chief of the general staff from 1815 to 1823. Volkonsky resigned in 1824 after a conflict with War Minister Count Alexey Arakcheyev. Van Halen visited the Tsar's assistant, Prince Dmitriy Vladimirovich Golitsyn, who had fought bravely during the Napoleonic Wars and was promoted to the rank of lieutenant general, governing Moscow for 25 years. Van Halen also visited the famous Spanish engineer Agustín de Betancourt, then director, and one of the founders, of the First Engineering Academy School of Russia.

Supported by Betancourt, who was trusted by other Russian military leaders, Van Halen was appointed colonel of the Caucasus Dragoon Regiment in Tbilisi, Georgia. He served under General Aleksey Petrovich Yermolov and Armenian prince Valerian Madatov, and participated in the conquest of Khosrekh on 21 June 1820 against the troops of Surkhay II (later replaced by Aslan Khan) in the Gazikumukh region of Daghestan. For this he received the medal of the Russian Order of St. George. In 1854, Van Halen donated the Tartar Yatagan long knife he had taken on 12 June 1820 to the Naval Museum of Madrid.

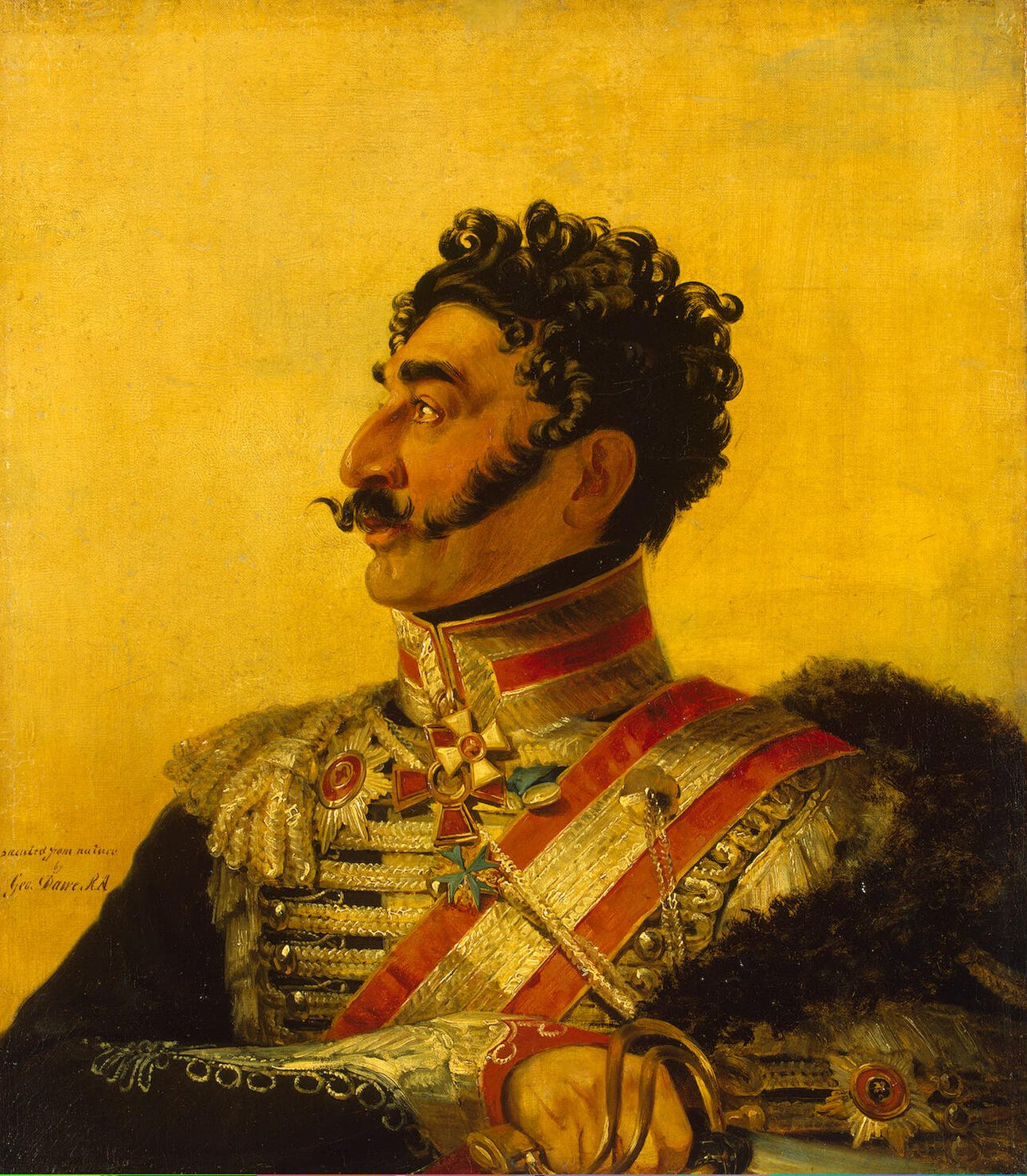
Armenian prince Valerian Madatov (Russian: Валериан Григорьевич Мадатов, 1782–1829), under whom Juan Van Halen served as a Russian Army colonel in 1818

Van Halen's liberal convictions prompted the Tsar, who was informed by Russian secret police, to remove him from the Caucasus in December 1820 and put him on the Austrian frontier. In 1821, he returned to Spain in the middle of the Trienio Liberal until the revolution was crushed by a European kingdom absolutist coalition that included Russia. He then stayed in Matanzas, Cuba, for three years while also doing business in New York and Philadelphia.

In 1830, Van Halen went to fight against the Netherlands to participate in the creation of the new kingdom of Belgium in the Belgian Revolution.

In 1831, as a condottiere in the 15th-century Italian style, he formed a military brigade of Belgian subjects to defend Portuguese liberals from the prosecutions of the absolutist King Miguel I of Portugal. This was funded by Cádiz businessman, banker, and politician Juan Álvarez Mendizabal.

Medal awarded to the volunteers who served with Juan Van Halen during the September Days of the Belgian Revolution, dating to June 1831

Before and after the war against the Netherlands, Van Halen took part in the First Carlist War in Catalonia under Generals José María Torrijos, Francisco Milans del Bosch and Francisco Espoz y Mina.

Van Halen returned to Spain in February 1833 after the death of King Fernando VII, but he traveled and make brief stays in Belgium and England from 1835 to 1838.

Since he was very close to General Baldomero Espartero, Van Halen joined him in exile in England when Espartero fell from grace in 1843.

He returned to Madrid in 1854 and received the Great Cross of King Carlos III on 30 November that year.

Van Halen first married Maria del Carmen Quiroga y Hermida in 1821. She died on 14 February 1859. After her death, Van Halen married Clotilde Butler y Abrines, the daughter of a Spanish Navy frigate captain, who died after 1854.

Van Halen died in El Puerto de Santa María, Cádiz, Spain, at the age of 76.

== Honors ==
- 1854: Knight Grand Cross in the Order of Charles III.
