= Sukiyakh =

Sukiyakh Сукиях Ссухъиящи
- Selo
- Location within Republic of Dagestan Location within Russia
- Coordinates: 42°07′N 47°14′E
- Country: Russia
- Region: Republic of Dagestan
- District: Kulinsky District
- Time zone: UTC+3:00

Sukiyakh (Russian: Сукиях; Lak: Ссухъиящи) is a rural locality (a selo) in Vikhlinsky Selsoviet, Kulinsky District, Republic of Dagestan, Russia. The population was 253 as of 2010. There are 2 streets.

== Geography ==
Sukiyakh is located 11 km northeast of Vachi (the district's administrative centre) by road. Vikhli and Tsyysha are the nearest rural localities.

== Nationalities ==
Laks live there.
