= Tsovkra-2 =

Tsovkra-2 Цовкра-2 Цӏувкӏул 2
- Selo
- Location within Republic of Dagestan Location within Russia
- Coordinates: 42°02′N 47°09′E
- Country: Russia
- Region: Republic of Dagestan
- District: Kulinsky District
- Time zone: UTC+3:00

Tsovkra-2 (Russian: Цовкра-2; Lak: Цӏувкӏул 2) is a rural locality (a selo) in Kulinsky District, Republic of Dagestan, Russia. The population was 420 as of 2010. There are 8 streets.

== Geography ==
Tsovkra-2 is located 20 km southwest of Vachi (the district's administrative centre) by road, on the left bank of the Kunnikh River. Tshushchar and Vachi are the nearest rural localities.

== Nationalities ==
Laks live there.
