= Inisha =

Rural locality in Russia

Inisha Иниша Иниши
- Selo
- Location within Republic of Dagestan Location within Russia
- Coordinates: 42°09′N 47°12′E
- Country: Russia
- Region: Republic of Dagestan
- District: Laksky District
- Time zone: UTC+3:00

Inisha (Russian: Иниша; Lak: Иниши) is a rural locality (or selo) in Khuninsky Selsoviet, Laksky District, Republic of Dagestan, Russia.

In 2010, the population was 131.

== Geography ==
Inisha is located 13 km (8.1 mi) southwest of the district's administrative centre Kumukh by road. Kani and Vikhli are the nearest rural localities.
