= Tankho Israilov =

- Танхо Израилов
- Born: December 2, 1917; Tsovkra-1, Mountain Republic (present-day Russia)
- Died: November 30, 1981 (aged 63); Moscow, Russian SFSR, Soviet Union
- Occupations: Ballet dancer; choreographer
- Years active: 1934–1978

Tankho Selimovich Izrailov (Note: Russian: Танхо Селимович Израилов, romanized: Tankho Selimovich Izrailov; Hebrew: תנקהו ישראלוב, romanized: Tenaḳehu Yiśraʼelov) (December 2, 1917 – November 30, 1981) was a Soviet Dagestan ballet dancer, a ballet master, a choreographer, and of Mountain Jewish origin. He was awarded the honorary title People's Artist of the USSR.

== Biography ==
Tankho Izrailov was born in the village of Tsovkra-1, Kulinsky District, Dagestan, Mountain Republic.

He studied at the Akhundov Azerbaijan State Academic Opera and Ballet Theatre, Baku. In 1934 Izrailov founded and led the dance ensemble of the Mountain Jews. From 1937 to 1954, he was the soloist and assistant choreographer of the Ensemble of Folk Dance of the USSR under the direction of Igor Moiseyev.

In 1955 Tankho Izrailov graduated from the department of the choreography at the Lunacharsky State Institute for Theatre Arts (GITIS) in Moscow.

Tankho Izrailov staged performances of dances of the play "Dawn of the Caspian Sea" at the Yermolova Theatre, "Grooms" (A. Tokayev) at the Moscow Academic Theatre of Satire, and "Silk Suzani" (A. Kakhara) at the Moscow Regional Drama Theater named after A. Ostrovsky. In 1954-55 Izrailov was the director of the National Academic Ensemble of Folk Dance "Joc," and from 1955 to 1958 he headed the Dance Ensemble of the Turkmen SSR.

Tankho Izrailov was the creator, artistic director and choreographer of the Choreography Folk Dance Ensemble of the Dagestan ASSR "Lezginka." The first performance took place on May 11, 1958 in Makhachkala Theater named after Maxim Gorky. Immediately after the first performance the ensemble was invited to Moscow to represent the culture of Dagestan in the State Kremlin Palace. Soon, the dance ensemble Lezginka began tours around the Soviet Union and foreign countries. They gained worldwide fame. Izrailov headed the dance ensemble Lezginka from 1958 to 1978.

He was buried at the Kuntsevo Cemetery in Moscow.

== Awards ==
- Honored Artist of the Turkmen SSR
- People's Artist of the RSFSR (1967)
- People's Artist of the USSR (1978)
- Order of the Badge of Honour
