= Kuli, Kulinsky District, Republic of Dagestan =

Kuli Кули Ккули
- Selo
- Location within Republic of Dagestan Location within Russia
- Coordinates: 42°01′N 47°14′E
- Country: Russia
- Region: Republic of Dagestan
- District: Kulinsky District
- Time zone: UTC+3:00

Kuli (Russian: Кули; Lak: Ккули) is a rural locality (a selo) in Kulinsky District, Republic of Dagestan, Russia. The population was 3,946 as of 2010. There are 19 streets.

== Geography ==
Kuli is located 8 km southeast of Vachi (the district's administrative centre) by road. Sumbatl and Khosrekh are the nearest rural localities.

== Nationalities ==
Laks live there.

== Famous residents ==
- Khalid Murachuyev (police lieutenant, Hero of the Russian Federation)
- Kurban Gammatsayev (commodity expert, professor)
