= Kura Khanate =

Lezgian state entity (1812–1864)

Kura Khanate Куьредин ханвал (Lezgian)
- 1812–1864
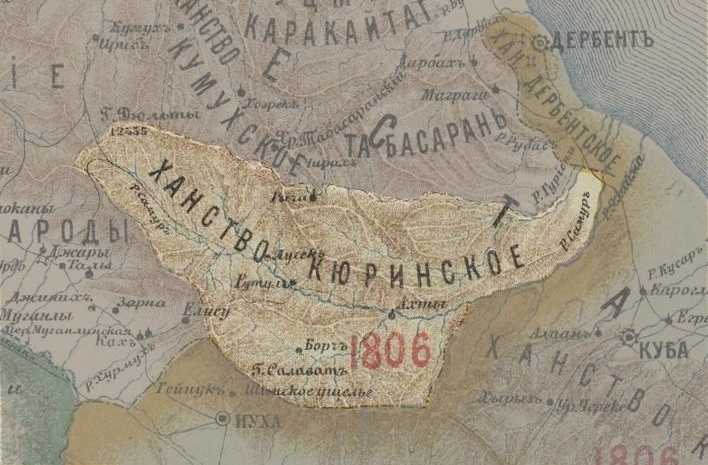
- The Kura Khanate on a map of the Caucasus region, showing its borders in 1806 (The map is inaccurate, as the territories of the Samur Free Societies were mistakenly included in the Kura Khanate).
- Capital: Kurakh
- Religion: Sunni Islam
- History
  - Established: 1812
  - Disestablished: 1864
Preceded by	Succeeded by
Gazikumukh Khanate	Russian Empire
- Today part of: Russia

Kura Khanate (Russian: Кюринское ханство, Lezgian: Куьредин ханвал) or Kürin Khanate was a state entity that existed from 1812 to 1864 in southern Dagestan. The khanate was ruled by a branch of ruling family of Gazikumukh Khanate.

== Geography ==
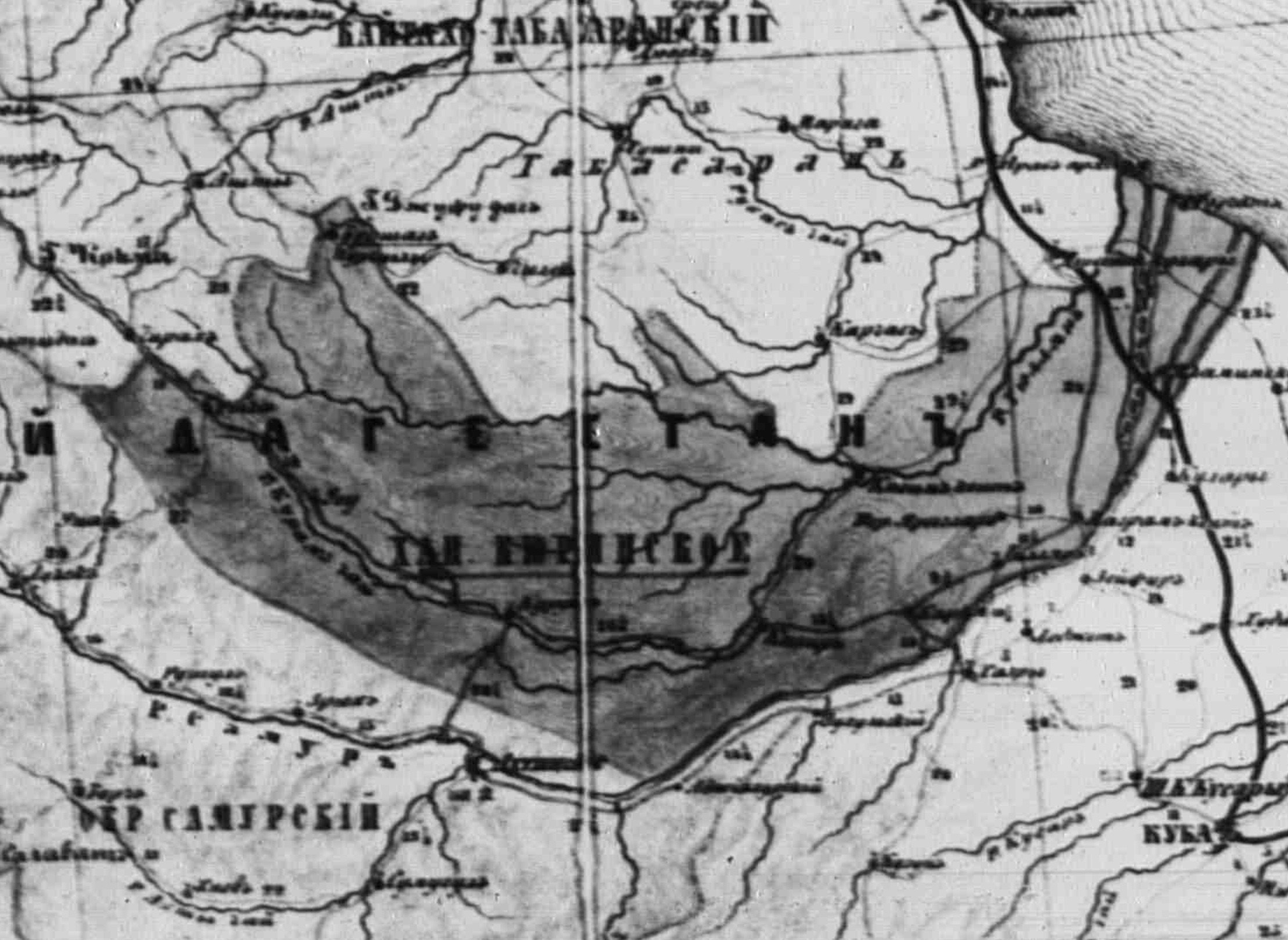
Kura Khanate (1865)

The Kura Khanate was located mainly in the historical and geographical region of Kura. It was located in nowadays Agulsky, Magaramkentsky District, Kurakhsky and Suleiman-Stalsky districts of Dagestan, Russia. In the south, the borders of the Kura Khanate extended to Quba Khanate along the direction of the Samur River. In the southwest, the khanate bordered on the top of the Samur ridge with the Akhty-para, Alty-para free societies, as well as the Rutul Federation. In the west and north, the Kura Khanate bordered on Gazikumukh, in the northeast with the Principality of Tabasaran. In the east, the khanate bordered on the Derbent Khanate.

== Establishment ==
Since 1791, the Lezgi people of Kura plain had lived under the Gazikumukh Khanate, whose ruler Surkhay II annexed the region, seizing it from Sheikh Mardan, the earlier lord. At the end of 1811, during Russo-Persian War of 1804–1813, Surkhay Khan allied to Sheikh Ali Khan, the former ruler of Quba and Derbent, and launched an invasion of Quba (which was taken by Russians in 1806). A Russian detachment marched against Sheikh Ali Khan and Nuhbek, the son of Surkhay Khan, in Kurakh. On December 15, 1811, Russian troops stormed Kurakh and Surkhai Khan fled to Gazikumukh. The expulsion of Surkhay Khan was perceived in the Kura as liberation. Aslan bek, son of Sheikh Mardan and the implacable enemy of his uncle Surkhay Khan, was entrusted with administration in Kura under special conditions.

After the departure of the Russian troops from the Kura, Surkhai Khan marched on the town to regain it. However, a Russian detachment led by Major General Nikolai Khotuntsov came to their aid. Surkhai Khan suffered heavy losses and was forced to retreat. In 1812, the Tsarist government officially acknowledged Kura Khanate to serve as a buffer zone between Russian Empire and Gazikumukh. According to the treaty signed on January 23, 1812, a garrison of the Russian troops from two battalions of infantry and hundreds of Cossacks was to be stationed in Kurakh. The Khan pledged to try by all means to bring neighboring Dagestani peoples into submission to Russia.

== History ==
The Khanate's first ruler was Aslan bek, nephew of Surkhay Khan. He was immediately promoted to major general rank. He also became ruler of Gazikumukh Khanate on July 12, 1820, when his uncle was defeated near the village of Khosrekh. On June 14, Russian troops entered and Aslan bek's rule was reinforced. After the death of Aslan-khan in 1836, the Caucasian administration handed over the reins of government in Gazikumukh to his son Muhammad Mirza khan, however the rule in Kura was given to Harun bek, the nephew of Aslan-khan, the son of his brother Tahir-bek.

The khanate changed sides after the uprising of Imam Shamil. In 1842, when the forces of Imam Shamil approached Gazikumukh, Harun bek went over to the side of the imam, surrendering to him the fortress with a garrison and ammunition. Harun bek's brother al-Hajj Yahya was one of Shamil's followers. Harun bek himself was sent back by Shamil to Kurakh, and his son Abbas-bek was taken as hostage. However soon enough the Russian detachment under the command of Colonel Zalivkin arrested Harun bek and sent him to Tbilisi. His brother Yusuf-bek was appointed Khan. Harun bek returned to rule in 1847 but his reign lasted only a year. Then from 1848 until the very end of the existence of the khanate in 1864, rule reverted to Yusuf bek. The last khan was distinguished by greed, cruelty, and disdain for his subjects, which turned the people of the khanate against themselves. Russian authorities then disestablished the khanate, and its lands became part of the Kyurinsky okrug of Dagestan Oblast.

== Population ==
The population of the khanate consisted mainly of Lezgins and Aghuls. The entire population adhered to Sunni Islam. The population of the khanate was estimated at 5,000 households. According to Platon Zubov there were less than 10,000 people and they were considered among the best warriors in Dagestan.

== Khans ==
1. Aslan Khan (1812–1835)
2. Nutsal Khan (1835–1836)
3. Muhammad Mirza Khan(1836–1838)
4. Harun bek (1838–1842; 1847–1848)
5. Yusuf bek (1842–1847; 1848–1864)
