= Kani, Republic of Dagestan =

Kani Кани Къяни
- Selo
- Location within Republic of Dagestan Location within Russia
- Coordinates: 42°08′N 47°11′E
- Country: Russia
- Region: Republic of Dagestan
- District: Kulinsky District
- Time zone: UTC+3:00

Kani (Russian: Кани; Lak: Къяни) is a rural locality (a selo) in Kulinsky District, Republic of Dagestan, Russia. The population was 292 as of 2010. There are 4 streets.

== Geography ==
Kani is located 13 km northwest of Vachi (the district's administrative centre) by road. Khoykhi and Vikhli are the nearest rural localities.

== Nationalities ==
Laks live there.
