= Kaya, Republic of Dagestan =

Kaya Кая Чӏяйми
- Selo
- Location within Republic of Dagestan Location within Russia
- Coordinates: 42°04′N 47°12′E
- Country: Russia
- Region: Republic of Dagestan
- District: Kulinsky District
- Time zone: UTC+3:00

Kaya (Russian: Кая; Lak: Чӏяйми) is a rural locality (a selo) and the administrative centre of Kayalinsky Selsoviet, Kulinsky District, Republic of Dagestan, Russia. The population was 577 as of 2010. There are 11 streets.

== Geography ==
Kaya is located 1 km northwest of Vachi (the district's administrative centre) by road. Vachi and Khoymi are the nearest rural localities.

== Nationalities ==
Laks live there.

== Famous residents ==
- Tsakhay Makayev (Hero of the Soviet Union)
- Gabibulakh Ganaliyev (Honored builder of Dagestan, laureate of the USSR State Prize
