= Tsysha =

Tsysha Цыйша Цӏуйши
- Selo
- Location within Republic of Dagestan Location within Russia
- Coordinates: 42°06′N 47°13′E
- Country: Russia
- Region: Republic of Dagestan
- District: Kulinsky District
- Time zone: UTC+3:00

Tsysha (Russian: Цыйша; Lak: Цӏуйши) is a rural locality (a selo) in Kulinsky District, Republic of Dagestan, Russia. The population was 383 as of 2010. There are 13 streets.

== Geography ==
Tsysha is located 8 km northeast of Vachi (the district's administrative centre) by road. Khoymi and Kaya are the nearest rural localities.

== Nationalities ==
Laks live there.
