= Tsovkra-1 =

Tsovkra-1 Цовкра-1 Цӏувкӏул 1
- Selo
- Location within Republic of Dagestan Location within Russia
- Coordinates: 42°03′N 47°16′E
- Country: Russia
- Region: Republic of Dagestan
- District: Kulinsky District
- Time zone: UTC+3:00

Tsovkra-1 (Russian: Цовкра-1; Lak: Цӏувкӏул 1) is a rural locality (a selo) in Kulinsky District, Republic of Dagestan, Russia. The population was 410 as of 2010. There are 7 streets. There has been a tradition of tightrope walking in Tsovkra-1 since the early 19th century.

== Geography ==
Tsovkra-1 is located 8 km southeast of Vachi (the district's administrative centre) by road. Vachi and Kaya are the nearest rural localities.
