= Voiced epiglottal fricative =

Consonantal sound represented by ⟨ʢ⟩ in IPA

ʢ
- IPA number: 174

Audio sample
- source · help

Encoding
- Entity (decimal): &#674;
- Unicode (hex): U+02A2
- X-SAMPA: <\
- Braille: ⠔ (braille pattern dots-35) ⠆ (braille pattern dots-23)
Image

Voiced epiglottal approximant

ʢ̞

Audio sample
- source · help

A voiced epiglottal fricative, or voiced pharyngeal trill, is a type of consonantal sound, used in some spoken languages. The symbol in the International Phonetic Alphabet that represents this sound is ⟨ʢ⟩.

Although the official name in the IPA for this sound has always been a voiced epiglottal fricative since it was introduced in 1989, laryngoscopic studies by John Esling have found that both epiglottal and pharyngeal consonants are pharyngeal in place of articulation, and are affected in manner by the aryepiglottic folds and larynx height; he therefore proposed the reclassification of ⟨ʢ⟩ as the trilled counterpart of ⟨ʕ⟩, noting both as ranging from fricatives to approximants, and later described realizations of ⟨ʢ⟩ ranging from a fricative, to a trill, to a fricative trill. Esling furthered this reclassification with a modified version of the IPA chart, merging pharyngeal and epiglottal consonants into a single column, placing ⟨ʢ⟩ as a trill, ⟨ʕ⟩ as a fricative, and ⟨ʕ̞⟩ as an approximant.

A voiced epiglottal approximant ⟨ʢ̞⟩ is reported in one study to occur in Dahalo, though the authors recognize that this is a precise description, and that the sound is still "pharyngeal in a broader sense", so that it may be describing the same sound as ⟨ʕ̞⟩.

Few languages distinguish between pharyngeal and epiglottal fricatives. However, according to Peter Ladefoged, the Aghul spoken in the village of Burkikhan, Dagestan has both a voiceless pharyngeal fricative and a voiceless epiglottal fricative.

== Features ==
Features of a voiced epiglottal fricative:

- Its manner of articulation is fricative, which means it is produced by constricting air flow through a narrow channel at the place of articulation, causing turbulence.
- Its place of articulation is epiglottal, which means it is articulated with the aryepiglottic folds against the epiglottis.
- Its phonation is voiced, which means the vocal cords vibrate during the articulation.
- It is an oral consonant, which means that air is not allowed to escape through the nose.
- It is a median consonant, which means it is produced by directing the airstream down the midline of the tongue, rather than to the sides.
- Its airstream mechanism is pulmonic, which means it is articulated by pushing air only with the intercostal muscles and abdominal muscles, as in most speech sounds.

== Occurrence ==
Language		Word	IPA	Meaning	Notes
Aghul	Richa dialect	ъакв	[ʢakʷ]	'light'	
Arabic	Iraqi	عَسل	[ʢasal]	'honey'	Corresponds to /ʕ/ (ﻉ) in Standard Arabic and other varieties. See Arabic phonology
Siwi			[təsˤʢa]	'nine'	
Stoney	Mînî Thnî dialect	parûda	[pʰɑˈʢũd̥ɑ]	'duck'	Produced as a trill. Allophone of [ʕ̞] when stressed (some speakers).

== See also ==
- Index of phonetics articles

== Notes ==
Place →	Labial					Coronal										Dorsal					Laryngeal			
Manner ↓	Bilabial		Labiodental		Linguolabial		Dental		Alveolar		Postalveolar		Retroflex		(Alveolo-)palatal		Velar		Uvular		Pharyngeal/epiglottal		Glottal	
Nasal	m̥	m	ɱ̊	ɱ		n̼	n̪̊	n̪	n̥	n	n̠̊	n̠	ɳ̊	ɳ	ɲ̊	ɲ	ŋ̊	ŋ	ɴ̥	ɴ				
Plosive	p	b	p̪	b̪	t̼	d̼	t̪	d̪	t	d			ʈ	ɖ	c	ɟ	k	ɡ	q	ɢ	ʡ		ʔ	
Sibilant affricate							t̪s̪	d̪z̪	ts	dz	t̠ʃ	d̠ʒ	tʂ	dʐ	tɕ	dʑ								
Non-sibilant affricate	pɸ	bβ	p̪f	b̪v			t̪θ	d̪ð	tɹ̝̊	dɹ̝	t̠ɹ̠̊˔	d̠ɹ̠˔			cç	ɟʝ	kx	ɡɣ	qχ	ɢʁ	ʡʜ	ʡʢ	ʔh	
Sibilant fricative							s̪	z̪	s	z	ʃ	ʒ	ʂ	ʐ	ɕ	ʑ								
Non-sibilant fricative	ɸ	β	f	v	θ̼	ð̼	θ	ð	θ̠	ð̠	ɹ̠̊˔	ɹ̠˔	ɻ̊˔	ɻ˔	ç	ʝ	x	ɣ	χ	ʁ	ħ	ʕ	h	ɦ
Approximant		β̞		ʋ				ð̞		ɹ		ɹ̠		ɻ		j		ɰ						˷
Tap/flap		ⱱ̟		ⱱ					ɾ̥	ɾ			ɽ̊	ɽ						ɢ̆		ʡ̆		
Trill	ʙ̥	ʙ							r̥	r		r̠	ɽ̊r̥	ɽr					ʀ̥	ʀ	ʜ	ʢ		
Lateral affricate									tɬ	dɮ			tꞎ	d𝼅	c𝼆	ɟʎ̝	k𝼄	ɡʟ̝						
Lateral fricative							ɬ̪		ɬ	ɮ			ꞎ	𝼅	𝼆	ʎ̝	𝼄	ʟ̝						
Lateral approximant								l̪	l̥	l		l̠	ɭ̊	ɭ	ʎ̥	ʎ	ʟ̥	ʟ		ʟ̠				
Lateral tap/flap									ɺ̥	ɺ			𝼈̊	𝼈		ʎ̆		ʟ̆						

		BL	LD	D	A	PA	RF	P	V	U
Implosive	Voiced	ɓ			ɗ		ᶑ	ʄ	ɠ	ʛ
Implosive	Voiceless	ɓ̥			ɗ̥		ᶑ̊	ʄ̊	ɠ̊	ʛ̥
Ejective	Stop	pʼ			tʼ		ʈʼ	cʼ	kʼ	qʼ
Ejective	Affricate		p̪fʼ	t̪θʼ	tsʼ	t̠ʃʼ	tʂʼ	tɕʼ	kxʼ	qχʼ
Ejective	Fricative	ɸʼ	fʼ	θʼ	sʼ	ʃʼ	ʂʼ	ɕʼ	xʼ	χʼ
Ejective	Lateral affricate				tɬʼ			c𝼆ʼ	k𝼄ʼ	q𝼄ʼ
Ejective	Lateral fricative				ɬʼ					
Click (top: velar; bottom: uvular)	Tenuis	kʘ qʘ		kǀ qǀ	kǃ qǃ		k𝼊 q𝼊	kǂ qǂ		
Click (top: velar; bottom: uvular)	Voiced	ɡʘ ɢʘ		ɡǀ ɢǀ	ɡǃ ɢǃ		ɡ𝼊 ɢ𝼊	ɡǂ ɢǂ		
Click (top: velar; bottom: uvular)	Nasal	ŋʘ ɴʘ		ŋǀ ɴǀ	ŋǃ ɴǃ		ŋ𝼊 ɴ𝼊	ŋǂ ɴǂ	ʞ	
Click (top: velar; bottom: uvular)	Tenuis lateral				kǁ qǁ					
Click (top: velar; bottom: uvular)	Voiced lateral				ɡǁ ɢǁ					
Click (top: velar; bottom: uvular)	Nasal lateral				ŋǁ ɴǁ					
