= Sheikh Muhammad Kurawi =

Sheikh Muhammad of Kura
- Шайх Мухьамад Яргуви (Ярагъви)
- Born: 1771; Vini Yargu, Dagestan
- Died: 1838 (aged 66–67); Sogratl, Dagestan, Caucasian Imamate
- Military career
- Allegiance: Caucasian Imamate
- Rank: Imam
- Conflicts: Murid War

Sheikh Muhammad Yarguvi 1771–1838) was a Lezgin sheikh, founder of Muridism in the Caucasus and teacher of all imams of Dagestan and Chechnya. Legendary Lezgin imam Muhammad Huluhvi and Avar imam Shamil Gimravi was his the most famous students.

== Biography ==
Sheikh Muhammad was born in 1771 in the Lezgin village of Vini-Yarag (Yargu) located in the south of Dagestan. He received his initial Islamic education in the madrasah of his native village. He studied with famous Ulama in the villages of Sogratl and Arakan. His teachers were such famous Dagestani theologians as Said Khachmazwi, Said Shinazwi, Hasan Kudaliwi and Maharram Akhzakhwi.
