= Obokh =

Obokh Обох ГӀобохъ
- Selo
- Location within Republic of Dagestan Location within Russia
- Coordinates: 42°17′N 47°02′E
- Country: Russia
- Region: Republic of Dagestan
- District: Gunibsky District
- Time zone: UTC+3:00

Obokh (Russian: Обох; Avar: ГӀобохъ) is a rural locality (a selo) in Gunibsky District, Republic of Dagestan, Russia. The population was 359 as of 2010.

== Geography ==
Obokh is located 23 km southeast of Gunib (the district's administrative centre) by road. Sogratl and Megeb are the nearest rural localities.
