= Shimikhyur =

Shimikhyur Шимихюр Шимихуьр
- Selo
- Location within Republic of Dagestan Location within Russia
- Coordinates: 41°39′N 47°41′E
- Country: Russia
- Region: Republic of Dagestan
- District: Kurakhsky District
- Time zone: UTC+3:00

Shimikhyur (Russian: Шимихюр; Lezgian: Шимихуьр) is a rural locality (a selo) and the administrative centre of Shimikhyusky Selsoviet, Kurakhsky District, Republic of Dagestan, Russia. The population was 425 as of 2010. There are 6 streets.

== Geography ==
Shimikhyur is located 13 km northwest of Kurakh (the district's administrative centre) by road, on the Khpedzhchay River. Khpyuk and Ahsar are the nearest rural localities.
