= Lutkun =

Lutkun Луткун
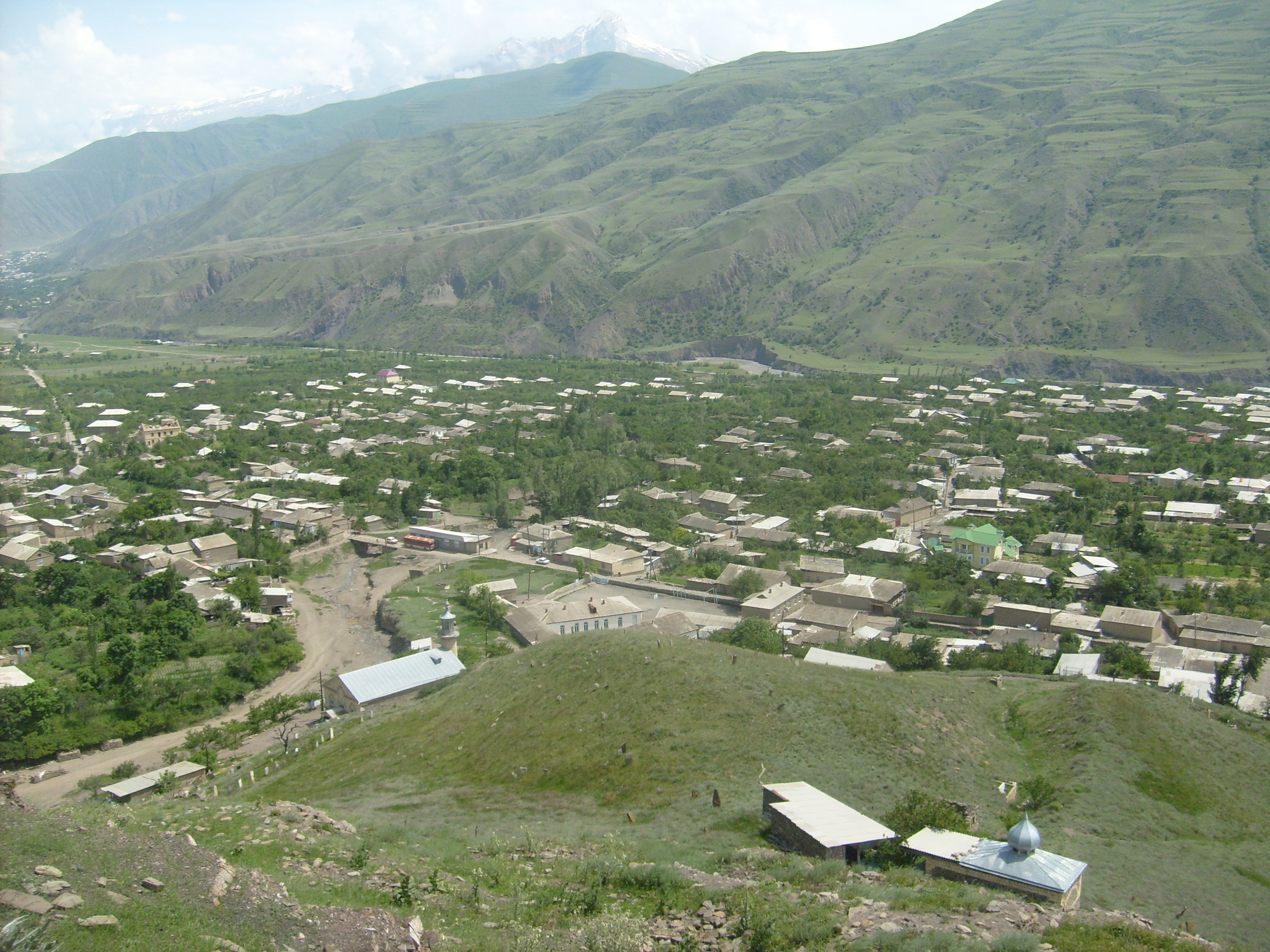
- View of Lutkun
- Interactive map of Lutkun
- Location of Lutkun Lutkun (Republic of Dagestan)
- Coordinates: 41°28′54″N 47°41′05″E
- Country: Russia
- Federal subject: Dagestan
- Administrative district: Akhtynsky District
- Elevation: 1,200 m (3,900 ft)

Population (2010 Census)
  - Total: 3,200
  - Estimate (2021): 2,539 (−20.7%)
- Time zone: UTC+3 (MSK)
- Postal code: 368740
- OKTMO ID: 82606445101

Lutkun (Lezgian: Луткун) is a village in Akhtynsky District of Dagestan, Russia. It is one of the most ancient and large settlements in the Samur valley, the second largest in Akhtynsky area.

== History ==
The ancient history of the village, not preserved, the first fortress village was founded in the 2nd century AD on the hill, in the old, historical part of the village. In the old village, surrounded by a high stone wall with two gates in the 12th-century madrasah was built, and even earlier, in the 10th-century mosque. On 9 August 2008, there was a solemn celebration of the 2000th anniversary of Lutkun.

== Population ==
In 2010, there were 3200 people. In 2002, there were 3059 people, (746 families-households). People village are lezgins nationality and Muslim-Sunni religion.

== Sport ==
In 2011 FC Samur won the Cup in South Daghestan football.
