= Richa, Republic of Dagestan =

Richa Рича Чӏаъ
- Selo
- Location within Republic of Dagestan Location within Russia
- Coordinates: 41°45′N 47°30′E
- Country: Russia
- Region: Republic of Dagestan
- District: Agulsky District
- Time zone: UTC+3:00

Richa (Russian: Рича; Aghul: Чӏаъ) is a rural locality (a selo) and the administrative centre of Richinsky Selsoviet, Agulsky District, Republic of Dagestan, Russia. The population was 1,267 as of 2010.

== Geography ==
Richa is located 9 km southwest of Tpig (the district's administrative centre) by road. Tpig is the nearest rural locality.
