= Xaçmazqışlaq =

- Municipality
- Location within Azerbaijan Location within Shaki-Zagatala Economic Region
- Coordinates: 40°59′04″N 47°36′20″E
- Country: Azerbaijan
- Rayon: Oghuz

Population
  - Total: 548
- Time zone: UTC+4 (AZT)
  - Summer (DST): UTC+5 (AZT)

Xaçmazqışlaq (also, Khachmaskyshlak, Khachmazkyshlak, Xaçmaz-Qışlaq, Khachmas-Kyshlak, and Khachmaz-Kyshlak) is a village and municipality in the Oghuz Rayon of Azerbaijan. It has a population of 548.
