= Tatarkhankent =

Tatarkhankent Татарханкент ТIатIархан
- Selo
- Location within Republic of Dagestan Location within Russia
- Coordinates: 41°34′N 48°05′E
- Country: Russia
- Region: Republic of Dagestan
- District: Suleyman-Stalsky District
- Time zone: UTC+3:00

Tatarkhankent (Russian: Татарханкент; Lezgian: ТIатIархан) is a rural locality (a selo) in Ullugatagsky Selsoviet, Suleyman-Stalsky District, Republic of Dagestan, Russia. Population: 142 (2010 census); 151 (2002 census); 93 (1989 Soviet census).

== Geography ==
Tatarkhankent is located 16 km southwest of Kasumkent (the district's administrative centre) by road. Ptikent is the nearest rural locality.
