= Khanates of the Caucasus =

Various Persian states in the Caucasus region from the 17th to 20th centuries

Political map of the eastern part of the Southern Caucasus between 1795 and 1801

The khanates of the Caucasus, also known as the Iranian Khanates, Persian khanates, or, more rarely, the Azerbaijani khanates, were various administrative units in the South Caucasus governed by a hereditary or appointed ruler under the official rule of Iran. The title of the ruler was khan, which was equivalent to the Ottoman rank of pasha.

Following the assassination of Nader Shah (r. 1736–1747) in 1747, internal chaos erupted in Iran, particularly in the South Caucasus, where semi-independent khanates emerged as a result of the lack of a centralized government.

The khans neither had territorial or religious unity, nor an ethnic or national identity; instead, they were mostly interested in preserving their positions and income.

== Overview ==
In Persian, the khanates were historically referred to as ulka or tuman, governed by a hakem (governor). The English word "khanate" is a translation of the Russian word khanstvo and the Armenian word khanut'iwn. The shah could promote a hakem's status to that of a khan, but the hakem could also adopt the title himself. In terms of structure, the khanates were a miniature version of Iranian kingship. The administrative and literary language in the South Caucasus until the end of the 19th century was Persian, with Arabic being used only for religious studies, despite the fact that most of the Muslims in the region spoke Azerbaijani — then known as "Caucasian Tatar".

The Iranian rulers Nader Shah, Karim Khan Zand, and Agha Mohammad Khan Qajar each campaigned to reassert Iranian authority in the region, and the khanates were always considered Iranian territories regardless of the degree of Iranian rulers' control over them.

The historian Gavin Hambly explains the state of Iranian control over the khanates as follows:

Naturally, it was those Khanates located closest to the province of Āẕarbāījān which most frequently experienced attempts to re-impose Iranian suzerainty: the Khanates of Erivan, Nakhchivān and Qarābāgh across the Aras, and the cis-Aras Khanate of Ṭālish, with its administrative headquarters located at Lankarān and therefore very vulnerable to pressure, either from the direction of Tabrīz or Rasht. Beyond the Khanate of Qarābāgh, the Khān of Ganja and the Valī of Gurjistān (ruler of the Kartli-Kakheti kingdom of south-east Georgia), although less accessible for purposes of coercion, were also regarded as the Shah's vassals, as were the Khāns of Shakki and Shīrvān, north of the Kura river. The contacts between Iran and the Khanates of Bākū and Qubba, however, were more tenuous and consisted mainly of maritime commercial links with Anzalī and Rasht. The effectiveness of these somewhat haphazard assertions of suzerainty depended on the ability of a particular Shah to make his will felt, and the determination of the local khans to evade obligations they regarded as onerous.

The Russian Empire's expansion into the South Caucasus, starting with the establishment of a protectorate over Kartli-Kakheti in 1783, ultimately led to a confrontation between Iran and Russia for control of the khanates. The Russo-Iranian War of 1804–1813 ended with the Treaty of Gulistan, which amongst other things led to the Iranian loss of seven khanates: Ganja, Karabakh, Quba, Derbent, Baku, Shirvan, and Shaki. The northern and central part of the Talysh Khanate, along with a part of northern Erivan (Shuregol), was also ceded to the Russian Empire. Following the conclusion of the Russo-Iranian War of 1826–1828 and the signing of the Treaty of Turkmenchay, Iran also lost the Erivan and Nakhichevan khanates to the Russians. Politically, the loss of the khanates was devastating for the Qajar dynasty because it damaged their reputation as the guardian of the Guarded Domains of Iran.

Finally, a certain amount of earlier Iranian political procedures was initially preserved by the Russian government in the Caucasus, such as using Persian documents to determine the status and property rights of distinguished Muslim figures. Thus, some of the Muslim begs, aqalars, and khans managed to fit their previous rank into the new Russian imperial structure.

== List ==
The khanates that soon emerged after the death of Nader Shah in 1747 were the following:

- Baku Khanate (1806 occupied and annexed to Russia)
- Derbent Khanate (1806 occupied and annexed to Russia, same year abolished)
- Erivan Khanate (1827 occupied by, 1828 annexed to Russia)
- Ganja Khanate (1804 occupied and annexed to Russia)
- Javad Khanate (1805, became part of the Shirvan Khanate)
- Karabakh Khanate (1805 protectorate of Russia, 1822 abolished)
- Nakhchivan Khanate (1827 occupied by, 1828 annexed to Russia)
- Quba Khanate (1805 protectorate of Russia, 1816 abolished)
- Shaki Khanate (1805 protectorate of Russia, 1819 abolished)
- Shirvan Khanate (1805 protectorate of Russia, 1820 abolished)
- Talysh Khanate (1802 protectorate of Russia, 1828 abolished)

== Coinage ==
A number of these khanates, including Ganja, Shirvan, Shaki, Derbent, and Karabakh, produced their own coins, first in the name of Nader Shah and then in the name of the Zand ruler Karim Khan Zand. A large portion of their coinage was completely nameless by the end of the 18th century. While a few uncommon issues of Derbent contain a vague reference to one of their khans, none of the khans ever put their names on their coins, due to lacking the legitimacy of a sovereign monarch and any claims to independence. These northern Iranian coins were made entirely of silver and copper.

While the value of the copper coin in the khanates are unknown, the silver coins' value continued to be the same as the abbasi and its divisions. In 1770, the German scholar Johann Friedrich Gmelin made the observation that the full worth of a coin could only be understood in the region in which it was originally struck, and that relocating cost money. As had been the circumstance with copper money prior to the 1730s, this implied that silver coins were used as tokens in the khanates.

== See also ==
- Treaty of Gulistan
- Treaty of Turkmenchay
- North Caucasus
- South Caucasus
- Russo-Persian Wars
- Armenia
- Azerbaijan
- Baku Governorate
- Elisabethpol Governorate
- Erivan Governorate
- Nagorno-Karabakh
- Western Azerbaijan (irredentist concept)
- Khoy Khanate

== Sources ==
- Akopyan, Alexander; Petrov, Pavel (2016). "The Coinage of Īrawān, Nakhjawān, Ganja and Qarabāḡ Khānates in 1747–1827". State Hermitage: 1–9.
- Amanat, Abbas (2017). Iran: A Modern History. Yale University Press. ISBN 978-0300112542.
- Behrooz, Maziar (2023). Iran at War: Interactions with the Modern World and the Struggle with Imperial Russia. I.B. Tauris. ISBN 978-0-7556-3737-9.
- Bournoutian, George (1976). The Khanate of Erevan Under Qajar Rule: 1795–1828. University of California. ISBN 978-0-939214-18-1.
- Bournoutian, George (1994). A History of Qarabagh: An Annotated Translation of Mirza Jamal Javanshir Qarabaghi's Tarikh-e Qarabagh. Mazda Publishers. ISBN 978-1-56859-011-0.
- Bournoutian, George (2016a). "Prelude to War: The Russian Siege and Storming of the Fortress of Ganjeh, 1803–4". Iranian Studies. 50 (1). Taylor & Francis: 107–124. doi:10.1080/00210862.2016.1159779. S2CID 163302882.
- Bournoutian, George (2016b). The 1820 Russian Survey of the Khanate of Shirvan: A Primary Source on the Demography and Economy of an Iranian Province prior to its Annexation by Russia. Gibb Memorial Trust. ISBN 978-1909724808.
- Bournoutian, George A. (2016c). "Quick Overview". The 1819 Russian Survey of the Khanate of Sheki: A Primary Source on the Demography and Economy of an Iranian Province Prior to its Annexation by Russia. Costa Mesa, California: Mazda Publishers. ISBN 978-1568593159.
- Bournoutian, George (2021). From the Kur to the Aras: A Military History of Russia's Move into the South Caucasus and the First Russo-Iranian War, 1801–1813. Brill. ISBN 978-9004445154.
- Daniel, Elton L. (2001). "Golestān Treaty". In Yarshater, Ehsan (ed.). Encyclopædia Iranica. Vol. XI/1: Giōni–Golšani. London and New York: Routledge & Kegan Paul. pp. 86–90. ISBN 978-0-933273-60-3.
- Deutschmann, Moritz (2015). Iran and Russian Imperialism: The Ideal Anarchists, 1800-1914. Routledge. ISBN 978-1317385301. OCLC 945764907.
- Hambly, Gavin R. G. (1991). "Iran During the Reigns of Fath 'Alī Shāh and Muhammad Shāh". The Cambridge History of Iran. Vol. 7. Cambridge University Press. pp. 144–173. ISBN 978-1-139-05499-7.
- Kazemzadeh, F. (1991). "Iranian relations with Russia and the Soviet Union, to 1921". In Avery, Peter; Hambly, Gavin R. G.; Melville, Charles Peter (eds.). The Cambridge History of Iran: From Nadir Shah to the Islamic Republic. Vol. 7. Cambridge: Cambridge University Press. pp. 314–349. ISBN 0-521-20095-4.
- Matthee, Rudi; Floor, Willem; Clawson, Patrick (2013). The Monetary History of Iran: From the Safavids to the Qajars. I.B.Tauris. ISBN 978-0-85772-172-3.
- Perry, John (1991). "The Zand Dynasty". The Cambridge History of Iran. Vol. 7. Cambridge University Press. pp. 63–104. ISBN 978-1-139-05499-7.
- Swietochowski, Tadeusz (1995). Russia and Azerbaijan: A Borderland in Transition. Columbia University Press. ISBN 978-0231070683.
