= Gazikumukh Khanate =

Lak khanate (1642–1860)

Gazikumukh Khanate Lak: Gazigumukssa Khanlug Lakssa Khanlug
- 1642–1860
- Banner of Gazikumukh according to artist Magomed Shabanov

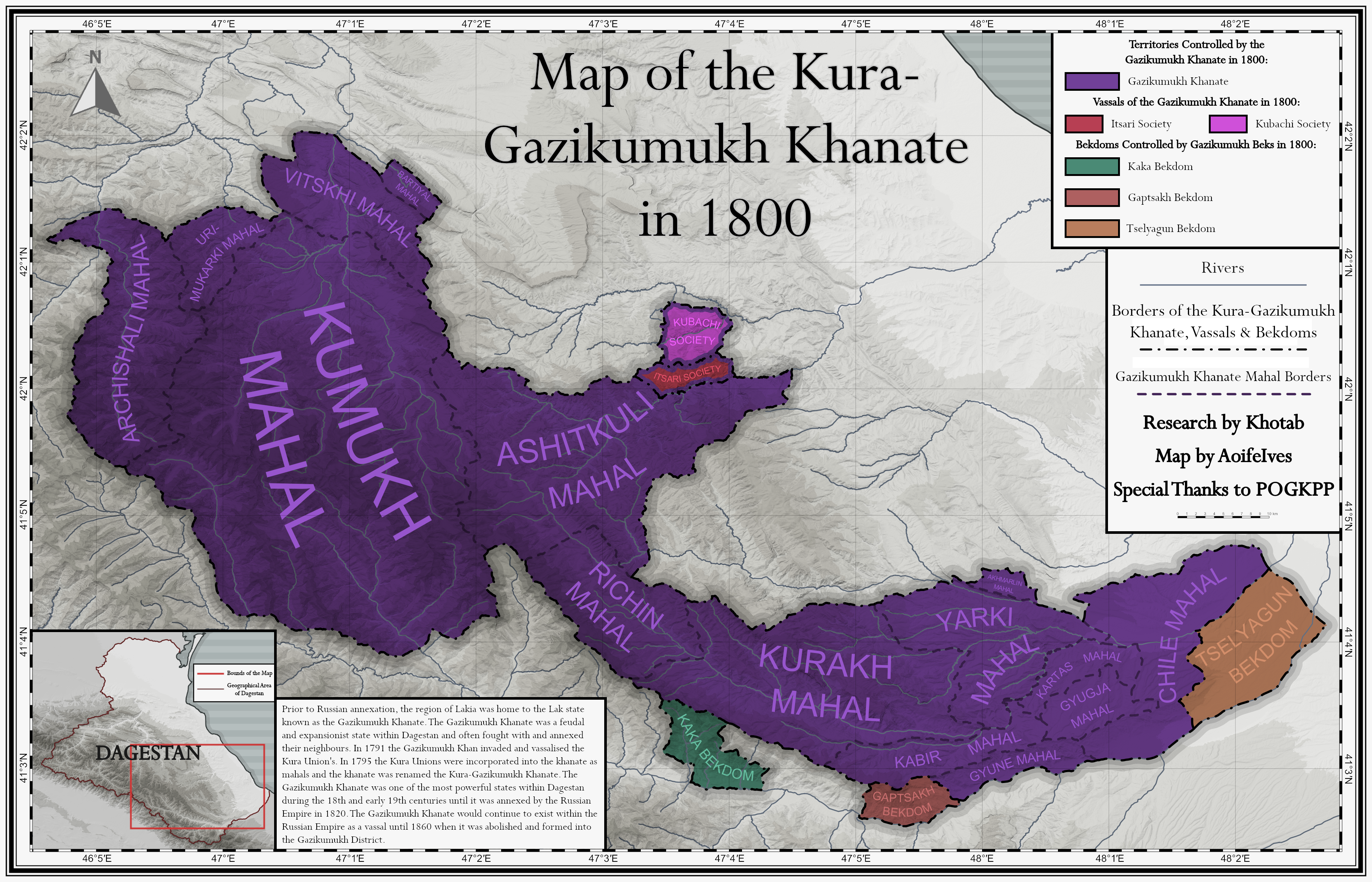
- Map of the Gazikumukh Khanate in 1800
- Capital: Gazi-Kumukh
- Common languages: Lak, Kumyk
- Religion: Islam
- Khan
- History
  - Established: 1642
  - Disestablished: 1860
Preceded by	Succeeded by
Shamkhalate of Tarki	Kumukh; Shamkhalate of Tarki

The Gazikumukh Khanate was a Lak state that was established in present-day Dagestan after the disintegration of Gazikumukh Shamkhalate in 1642. Its peoples included various Lezgin tribes and Avars.

== State structure ==
=== Supreme council ===
Khanate was ruled by the supreme council known as "Kat" in Lak or "Divan" where viziers, main qadis, warlords and the ruler participated in the meetings. Local governments consisted of jama'at, council of chiefs, judge and executor. Police functions were performed by the khan's noukers.

=== Territory ===
The state of Laks consisted of one Lakia that was divided into such territories as "Kullal", "Uri-Mukarki", "Machaymi", "Vitskhi", "Gumuchi" and "Bartki".

== Khalklavchi Alibek II ==
=== Election ===
After the capital of the Shamkhalate was transferred to Tarki, Gazi-Kumukh was governed by the supreme council. In 1642 Alibek II, son of Tuchilav, son of Alibek I, son of Chopan-shamkhal, son of Budai-shamkhal, was elected the ruler of Gazi-Kumukh, with the title "khalklavchi".

== Surkhay-khan I ==
=== Election ===
In 1700, the Laks gave their ruler a popular title – khan. The council of chiefs elected Surkhay-bek (1680–1748), son of Garey-bek, son of khalklavchi Alibek II from a shamkhal family that remained in Gazi-Kumukh, a ruler. Surkhay-khan I established a Lak state with a strong central power.

=== Anti-Iranian movement ===
Public dissatisfaction in Shirvan with the Persians led to a revolt. In 1707, the population of Djaria and Tsakhur led by their elders attacked Shamakha, the residence of the ruler of Shirvan. In 1708, Iranian troops under the command of Imam Kuli-khan advanced from Kakheti and crushed the uprising. In 1709 in Azerbaijan, Haji Davud also rebelled against the Persians. Utsmy Ahmed-khan called on the people to fight the Persian shias.

=== Alliances ===
In 1710 an agreement was signed between Gazikumukh Khanate and Avar Khanate that proclaimed a political-military alliance. Surkhay-khan I forming the Gazikumukh army and like the shamkhal of Tarki became an ally of the Shah of Persia.

In 1720 the Shah of Persia, Sultan Husayn, called his allies to assist and suppress the uprising in Shirvan. Surkhay-khan I gathered the Gazi-Kumukh army and advanced to Shirvan, to help the shah. Not far from Kabala, Surkhay-khan I was stopped by the Sunni delegation of Shirvan led by Haji Davud who urged Surkhay-khan I to support the Sunnis than the Shias. Utsmy Ahmed-khan was in alliance with Haji Davud against the "rafidas". Surkhay-khan I decided to support the sunnis of Shirvan.

=== Invasion of Shirwan ===
In 1721 on July 21, Surkhay-khan I and Haji Davud invaded the Safavid Iranian city of Shemakha, the major trading center of Shirvan, and captured it. English writer Jonas Hanway wrote that "the city was ransacked". Utsmy Ahmed-khan could take part in this campaign due to a threat from shamkhal of Tarki.

=== Intrusion of Peter I of Russia ===
In 1722 a 110 thousand army of Peter I of Russia came to Dagestan as he invaded the Iranian domains in the region during the Russo-Persian War (1722-1723). Surkhay-khan I spoke out against the colonial policy of Russia, but avoided an armed clash with Peter. Colonel Alexander Komarov wrote that "In 1723 September 12, shah Tahmasp had ceded to Russia the whole Caspian region from Astrabad to Sulak, however Gazi-Kumukh was not included there. The merit of Gazi-Kumukh reached a high point in Dagestan".

In 1724 Surkhay-khan I refused to acknowledge the extension of Ferhat-pasha treaty that passed Shirvan from Persia to Turkey. Surkhay-khan I demanded from Turkey to hand Shirvan over to his rule. Turkey refused. Surkhay-khan I, Ahmed-khan and Nutsal of Avaria ransacked Shirvan for one whole year.

=== Governing Shirvan ===
In 1725 (in another version in 1728) Turkey issued a Firman that proclaimed Surkhay-khan I the ruler of Shirvan. According to Butkov, Surkhay-khan I was not subordinate to Turkish authority "as he understood his strength". Surkhay-khan I receiving the title of khan of Shirvan and Gazi-Kumukh, made Shemakha his residence, built schools, fortresses and roads.

Historian Gusaynov wrote that "as early as July 1730 shah of Persia offered Surkhay-khan I a position of Persian viceroy in Shemakha but Surkhay-khan I refused". In 1733 Nader, a commander-in-chief of the Persian army, defeated the Turkish army near Baghdad. Accordingly, Turkey was transferring to Persia several provinces including Shirvan. General Nader sent his messenger to Surkhay-khan I of Shirvan and demanded him to leave. Surkhay-khan I wrote to Nader a letter saying that "Shirvan was conquered by the Lezgins (Dagestani) swords and not given to him by Turkey as a gift, and that neither Sultan of Turkey nor Ahmed of Baghdad have the right to request him to hand over this territory". Surkhay-khan I reflected the will of Dagestanis and Shirvanis who were categorically against the Persian takeover of Shirvan.

=== First invasion ===
In 1734 on August 17 general Nader moving in different directions captured Shemakha, Qabala, Khachmaz, Derbent and Kura. Surkhay-khan I clashed with Nader in Deve-Batan, not far from Qabala, where highlanders and the Turks were defeated by a strong enemy artillery. Advancing further on Nader's artillery stormed the positions of Surkhay-khan I at Koysu river for three days and arrived in Gazi-Kumukh. General-in-chief V. Y. Levashov wrote: "Surkhay was not able to resist the great gun-fire". Surkhay-khan I retreated to Andalal, according to the "Chronicle of wars of Djaria". Nader then marched against Abdullah-pasha, who was standing with Turkish forces near Erevan.

Crimean Kaplan Girey-khan, by the order of Turkish sultan, removed Khazbulat-shamkhal and appointed Eldar-bek of Kazanish, an ally of Surkhay-khan I, as new shamkhal. These events triggered the second Persian invasion of Dagestan.

=== Second invasion ===
In November 1735 Nader overcoming the resistance captured Ganja, Djaria, Sheki, Shirvan, Shemakha, and Derbent. In December Nader advanced to Madjalis where "people of Akusha stubbornly defended themselves but were defeated", noted Bakikhanov. Persians besieged the fortress of utsmi who was forced to surrender.

Nader then headed for Gazi-Kumukh. Surkhay-khan I stood not far from Gazi-Kumukh where 30 thousand army of Nader clashed with a 10 thousand army of Surkhay-khan I. "Land was red with blood as Jaihun" wrote Iranian historian Muhammed Gazim. Surkhay-khan I retreated to Andalal again. Historian Jones wrote that "the fierce sea of the conqueror’s army turned its waves on habitats and fields of Kumukh, and possessions of all people of this place were destroyed".

Russian military administration in the north Caucasus reported that utsmi Ahmed-khan with Surkhay-khan I built ten fortifications equipped with guns. Russian officer Kalushkin at the Persian court informed the Senate in Moscow that "Surkhay-khan ransacked Derbent fortress, defeated the army of Mehdi-khan". In 1738 Ibrahim-khan marched against Dagestanis who dealt a crushing defeat to the shah's army of Ibrahim-khan.

=== Third invasion ===
In 1741 on July 2, Nader-shah invaded Dagestan at the head of 100 thousand army. Before the invasion Nader-shah declared that "I took under my power Hindustan, the lands of Turan and Iran. Now, I intend with enormous and countless army to conquer the kingdom of Kumukh". Shah's historiographer Mirza-Mehdi Astarabadi wrote: "The banners that conquered the world are leaving Iran and heading to Dagestan".

Persians faced battles in Bashli, Dubek, Tabasaran, Kaitag and Djengutai. Muhammed Gazim, historian of Nader-shah, wrote that "the troops of Surkhay kept on firing from guns for two hours and all the 20 thousand shooters of Khorasan and Turkestan left this world". Nevertheless, Persians overcame the defences of highlanders. By August 1741 Surkhay-khan I retreated to his fortress in Gazi-Kumukh but surrendered in a week. Muhammad-bek and Murtazali-bek with five thousand army retreated to Andalal. Ahmed-khan retreated to Andalal as well where highlanders began to gather.

== Murtazali-khan ==
=== Election ===
Murtazali-bek, the son of Surkhay-khan I, became the khan of Laks. Murtazali-khan was married to the daughter of Muhammad-qadi of Sogratl.

=== Andalal battle ===
In 1741 at the end of August, Nader-shah approached the territory of Andalal. Sogratl became the military centre of Dagestanis. Murtazali-khan at the head of Dagestani army stood in Andalal. Four days and four nights passed in heavy battles. Persians were routed under Sogratl, Megeb, Chokh and Oboch.

=== Turchidag battle ===
A decisive historical battle began on September 12 of 1741 on the Turchidag plateau. In Aymaki gorge Persian army was attacked and defeated too. French diplomat in St. Petersburg Marquis de La Chétardie wrote: "The defeat was all the more significant that Nader Shah lured himself into a trap and got into the canyon where hidden forces on both sides have made a terrible massacre of most of his army". By night of September 28 Nader-shah hastily retreated from Andalal losing 40 thousand of his army, according to I. Kalushkin.

Murtazali-khan pursued the retreating Persians up to Derbent. Kalushkin reported that "shah was so cruelly beaten that he was forced to turn back three times to defend himself". As it was written: "Salutes were given In Istanbul. In Petersburg people could not conceal their joy".

== Muhammad-khan ==
=== Election ===
In 1743 Muhammad-bek, son of Surkhay-khan I, took over the throne of Gazikumukh Khanate. Sefi-Mirza II known as Sam-Mirza a "miraculously saved Sefevid prince" arrived from Turkey to Muhammad-khan. Some Persian nobles swore allegiance to Sam-Mirza. Muhammad-khan decided to take over Shirvan and help Sam-Mirza reach the Persian throne. Turkish minister promised to support saying: "When the mentioned prince will be firmly established on the stolen throne of his ancestors, then he will give back previously under our rule states of Shirvan, Ganja, Tiflis and Yerevan".

=== Capture of Shirwan ===
At the end of 1743 Muhammad-khan invaded Kura, Derbent and Shabran that were under Persian rule. Abdal Gani-khan Afghani, Nader-shah's general who defended Shabran, was killed. Muhammad-khan moved further and captured Agsu, the new capital of Shirvan.

During 1743-1745 Muhammad-khan resided in Shirvan. In 1745 Nasrulla-Mirza, son of Nader-shah, led the shah's army on Muhammad-khan at Agsu. Nader-shah sent Ashur-khan Afshar, Karim-khan, Fatali-khan Afshar and prince Nasrullah-Mirza to fight with Muhammad-khan and his supporters. After the battle Muhammad-khan retreated to Gazi-Kumukh. Shah's army once again occupied Derbent and Kura.

In the spring of 1747 Muhammad-khan with allies invaded Kura, Derbent and Quba. Gadjiev V. writes that in 1747 "shah decided to punish Muhammad-khan by all means. However, Nader-shah was killed in a coup at the palace". As the Georgian historian Vakhushti had written: "Nader-shah was not able to defeat the Lezgins (Dagestanis) as he wished".

In 1748 Surkhay-khan I died in Gazi-Kumukh. The mother of Surkhay-khan I was called Umamat, she was a sister Omar-khan of Avaria. Daughter of Surkhay-khan I was married to a son of Avar khan. Muhammad-khan had three wives. The first wife was the daughter of Khasbulat-shamkhal of Tarki, from her he had four sons. Second wife was the daughter of Tishsiz-Bammat of Kazanish, the khan of Mekhtula Khanate, and had one son from her. Third wife was Istadjalu, the daughter of Abdal Gani-khan Afghani.

=== Gevdusha battle ===
Soon Fatali-khan captured Kura, Derbent, Quba and Shemakha. Eldar-bek and Shahmardan-bek of Gazi-Kumukh following a dispute with Muhammad-khan fled to Fatali-khan. Muhammad-khan rendered his preference of the future ruler to Surkhay-bek, born from the daughter of Abdal Gani-khan. In subsequent years Fatali-khan was in conflict with utsmi of Kaitag, nutsal of Avaria and the khan of Gazi-Kumukh.

A coalition was formed which included many rulers of Dagestan who undertook an invasion of Quba Khanate. A battle took place in the Gevdusha valley where Fatali-khan suffered a defeat and retreated to Salyan.

=== Russian intrusion ===
Russia after receiving the appeal of Fatali-khan began combat actions in the Caucasus. In 1775 March 4, general Frederick Medem crossed over Terek river and invaded Derbent, Kura and Quba. Utsmi Amir-Hamza retreated from Derbent to Kaitag and Muhammad-khan from Quba to Gazi-Kumukh.

In 1776 Russian army was recalled from Dagestan as "Fatali-khan reconciled his disputes with the khan of Kaitag, khan of Gazi-Kumukh and the ruler of Tabasaran". In 1789 after the death of Muhammad-khan, his son Surkhay-bek was elected the ruler of Gazikumukh Khanate.

== Surkhay-khan II ==
=== Personality ===
Ali al-Ghumuqi, a scholar from Kumukh wrote that "Surkhay-khan II was a religious scholar, who knew Qur'an by heart. He restored three mosques in Kumukh: Burhay mosque, Qadi mosque and Friday mosque". Mosque in Tpik was also reconstructed by Surkhay-khan II. Van Galen, officer and an eyewitness wrote: "This was a remarkable man. He was tall and had a formidable appearance especially in an old age. In the mountains he was famous for extensive teachings in the Muslim spirit, and due to his ancient family had great connections throughout Dagestan and was respected by all the neighboring people".

Surkhay-khan II had two wives: the first was Lak and from her there were four sons and a daughter, the second wife was Avar, sister of Umma-khan of Avaria. "Daughter of Surkhay-khan II, Gulandash-khanum, was married to Mustafa-khan of Shirvan, a relative of Surkhay-khan II". Ahmed-khan Sultan of Tsakhur, son of Alkhaz-bek, was married to the daughter of Surkhay-khan II. Sultan of Elisu Daniyal-bek was grandson of Surkhay-khan II. During 1796 Surkhay-khan II was an influential ruler in Dagestan having an army of 25 thousand men.

=== Alliances ===
At the end of 18th century Caucasian conflict erupted once again with participation of Iran, Turkey and Russia. Turkish emissaries visited the khans of Lakia and Avaria with large sums of money asking for alliance against Russia. Surkhay-khan II becomes an ally of Turkey.

=== Military actions ===
In 1796 Catherine II of Russia sent general Valerian Zubov for further conquest of southern Dagestan during the Persian Expedition of 1796. General Zubov invaded Quba Khanate and Derbent. After the death of Catherine II, Russian troops pulled out of southern Dagestan.

Al-Ghumuqi wrote that in 1797 Surkhay-khan II gave decisive battles in Karachay–Cherkessia. In 1803 Octobers 22, Surkhay-khan II crossed Alazani and attacked the Kabardin battalion of Tiflis regiment, under the command of Major-General Gulyakov. Gordin Y. A. wrote that "Surkhay-khan II is one of the strongest Lezgin rulers in Dagestan".

In 1811 December 15, generals Guryev and Khatuntsev besieged the fortress of Kurakh where Surkhay-khan II resided. After the battle Surkhay-khan II retreated to Gazi-Kumukh. General Khatuntsev passed the management of Kurakh, the capital of Kura region, to Aslan-bek son of Shahmardan-bek.

In May 1813 Surkhay-khan II attacked the Kurakh garrison, but was repelled by Aslan-bek. Surkhay-khan II passed the management of khanate to his son Murtazali-bek and left for Tabriz to shah Abbas-Mirza. Surkhay-khan II was not able to win over the shah.

In 1816 Ermolov was appointed Commander-in-Chief of the Caucasus region. In 1818 rulers of Gazikumukh, Avaria, Mekhtula, Tabasaran and Kaitag, unite against general Ermolov. In 1819 October 19 Surkhay-khan II with a 3 thousand army attacked the Chirakh garrison but didn't succeed and ordered to retreat. Major General Vrede fortified tsar's troops in Beduk, Richa and Chirag, against the attacks of Surkhay-khan II.

=== Capture of Gazi-Kumukh ===
In 1820 general Aleksey Ermolov decided to capture Gazi-Kumukh, the stronghold of anti-colonial struggle of highlanders, by a direct attack. A decisive battle took place on June 12 near Khosrekh village. General Madatov with army divisions from Shirvan, Shaki, Quba and Karabakh moved to Khosrekh. By artillery fire Russians overcame the defences of highlanders. Khosrekh was captured and further Gazi-Kumukh. In 1820 after 25 years of war of Surkhay-khan II, the Gazikumukh Khanate was conquered by Russian empire. Ermolov wrote after capturing Gazi-Kumukh: "Russian army appeared in this place for the first time". In August 1820 Surkhay-khan II left for Persia to Fat′h Ali-shah.

Surkhay-khan II gave many battles of which the largest were at Tiflis, Derbent, Khosrekh, Chirakh, Kurakh, Kartukh, Alazani, Quba, Akhaltsikhe, Akhalkalaki, Kartli, Kakheti, fortress Surkhayli in Cherkessia, Ganja, Yerevan, Kars, Ardagan and Erzurum.

After the capture of the Gazi-Kumukh Khanate, Sufism as the teachings of Qizilbashes, had spread in Dagestan, that had been prevented by the war of Surkhay-khan II.

== Aslan-khan ==
In 1820 Aslan-bek was elected the ruler of Gazi-Kumukh Khanate who also inherited the Kura Khanate which was restored by Russians into an independent Khanate in gratitude to Aslan-bek for his services. Aslan-khan was elevated to the rank of Major-General. In 1826 Surkhay-khan II returned from Persia and in 1827 died in the village of Sogratl in Andalal at the age of 83. His son Nukh-bek migrated to Turkey where he died in 1828.

Being part of Russia highlanders ran into state organised serfdom. Russian management toughened exploitation of peasants. This situation led to a powerful social unrest and revolt.

Laks were such political figures of Caucasian war as Haji Yahya-bek, Muhammad-Efendi Guyminski, Buk-Muhammad and Bashir-bek (naibs of Imam Shamil). Direct descendant of khans of Gazi-Kumukh was Muhammad-Amin (Imam of Abkhazia and Cherkessia 1848-1859). In 1832 Russian administration appointed Aslan-khan a temporary ruler of Avaria. Mother of Aslan-khan, Aymesey, was sister of Umma-khan of Avaria.

== Nutsal Aga-khan ==
In 1836 Nutsal Aga-bek, the eldest son of Aslan-khan, was appointed the ruler of Gazi-Kumukh. Nutsal Aga-khan arrived at the funeral of his father as a legitimate khan, appointed by Russian Tsar. Kura Khanate was ruled by Garun-bek, son of Tagir-bek, brother of Aslan-khan.

== Muhammad Mirza-khan ==
In 1836 Muhammad Mirza-khan was appointed the khan of Gazi-Kumukh. Muhammad Mirza-khan was promoted to the rank of colonel and got a letter of investiture from the Russian Tsar.

== Ummu Kulsum-beke ==
In 1838 the ruler of the Gazi-kumukh became Ummu Kulsum-beke, the wife of Aslan-khan. Representatives of Gazi-Kumukh clergy came to Ummu Kulsum-beke with a request from people to take charge of state affairs offering her Mahmud-bek, nephew of Aslan-khan, as an assistant.

Haji Yahya-bek of Gazi-Kumukh fled to Imam Shamil and became one of his naibs and later started negotiations with Mahmud-bek to assist Imam Shamil. It was said in the Russian document of that time: "Mahmud-bek and Garun-bek have gradually involved everyone in very close relations with Shamil". Prushanovsky wrote: "if someone was robbed by Shamil, it was enough to come to Mahmud-bek and the lost property was always returned".

In 1841 Haji Yahya-bek captured the fortress of Gazi-Kumukh, briefly incorporating Lak lands into Imamate. Imam Shamil later arrived in Gazi-Kumukh. Mahmud-bek and his brother Garun-bek the ruler of Kura Khanate, who were in Gazi-Kumukh, declared themselves allies of Imam Shamil.

== Abdurahman-khan ==
In 1841 Abdurahman-bek was elected the ruler of Gazi-Kumukh. Abdurahman-bek married Shamay-beke, daughter of Nutsal Aga-khan. Kura Khanate was ruled by Yusuf-bek. In 1844 Shamil captured villages of Nitsovkra, Duchi, Tulisma, Kulushats and Churtakh in Lakia.

In the summer of 1847 Aglar-bek, younger brother of Abdurahman-khan, arrived from St. Petersburg to Gazi-Kumukh in the rank of staff-captain of the Russian Army Guards. From the early years Aglar-bek was in St. Petersburg as a hostage.

== Aglar-khan ==
Banner of highlanders

In 1848 the ruler of Gazikumukh Khanate became Aglar-khan (1848–1859). Haji Yahya-bek suffered a defeat from Aglar-khan in a battle for Shovkra village.

In 1851 Naib Buk-Muhammad of Gazi-Kumukh with part of his people was killed on the battlefield. He was buried in the Kirkhlar cemetery of martyrs in Derbent. On the banner of Buk-Muhammad captured by Russians the following inscription was embroidered: "Do not lose bravery. Be indifferent to the dangers of war. Nobody will die before a decreed hour of death".

In 1859 after the death of Aglar-khan, Gazikumukh Khanate was abolished "due to absence of heir", although there was such heir: Jafar-bek, son of Aglar-khan, who was still young. The territory of Khanate was renamed to Gazikumukh District. Management of Gazikumukh District was given to a Russian staff-officer.

== Jafar-khan ==
In 1877 Jafar-khan was elected the ruler of an independent Gazi-Kumukh who assembled the army of Laks, Aguls, Lezgins, Tabasarans, Rutuls, Avars and decided to capture Derbent but before reaching it learned of a defeat in Levashi and other strongholds. Jafar-khan turned off the Derbent road and headed to Kaitag.

== See also ==
- Lak people (Dagestan)
- Dagestan
- Northeastern Caucasian languages
- Lak language
