= Chirag, Republic of Dagestan =

Chirag Чираг Хьургъни
- Selo
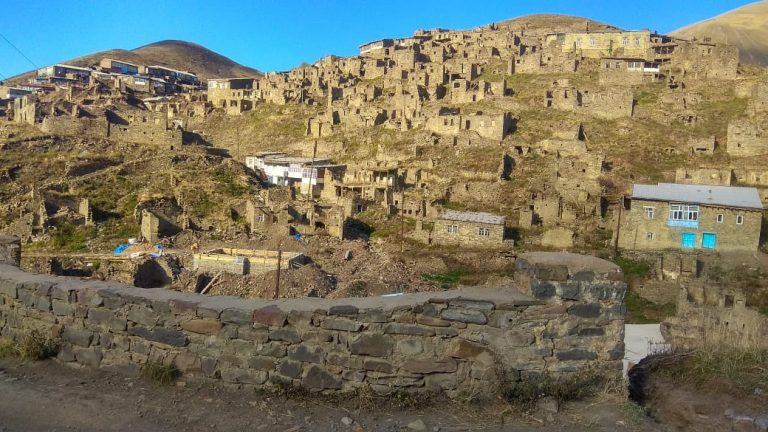

- Location within Republic of Dagestan Location within Russia
- Coordinates: 41°50′N 47°25′E
- Country: Russia
- Region: Republic of Dagestan
- District: Agulsky District
- Time zone: UTC+3:00

Chirag (Russian: Чираг; Aghul: Хьургъни) is a rural locality (a selo) in Agulsky District, Republic of Dagestan, Russia. The population was 545 as of 2010.

== Geography ==
Chirag is located on the Chiragchay River, 19 km northwest of Tpig (the district's administrative centre) by road. Richa is the nearest rural locality.
