= Yalak, Republic of Dagestan =

Yalak Ялак Ялахъ
- Selo
- Location within Republic of Dagestan Location within Russia
- Coordinates: 41°31′N 47°36′E
- Country: Russia
- Region: Republic of Dagestan
- District: Akhtynsky District
- Time zone: UTC+3:00

Yalak (Russian: Ялак; Lezgian: Ялахъ) is a rural locality (a selo) in Akhtynsky District, Republic of Dagestan, Russia. The population was 586 as of 2012.

== Geography ==
Yalak is located 21 km northwest of Akhty (the district's administrative centre) by road. Khryug is the nearest rural locality.
