= Levashi =

Levashi may refer to the following rural localities in Russia

- Levashi, Republic of Dagestan, a selo in the Republic of Dagestan
- Levashi, Tyumen Oblast, a selo in Tyumen Oblast
