= Burkikhan =

Burkikhan Буркихан Гехъуьн
- Selo
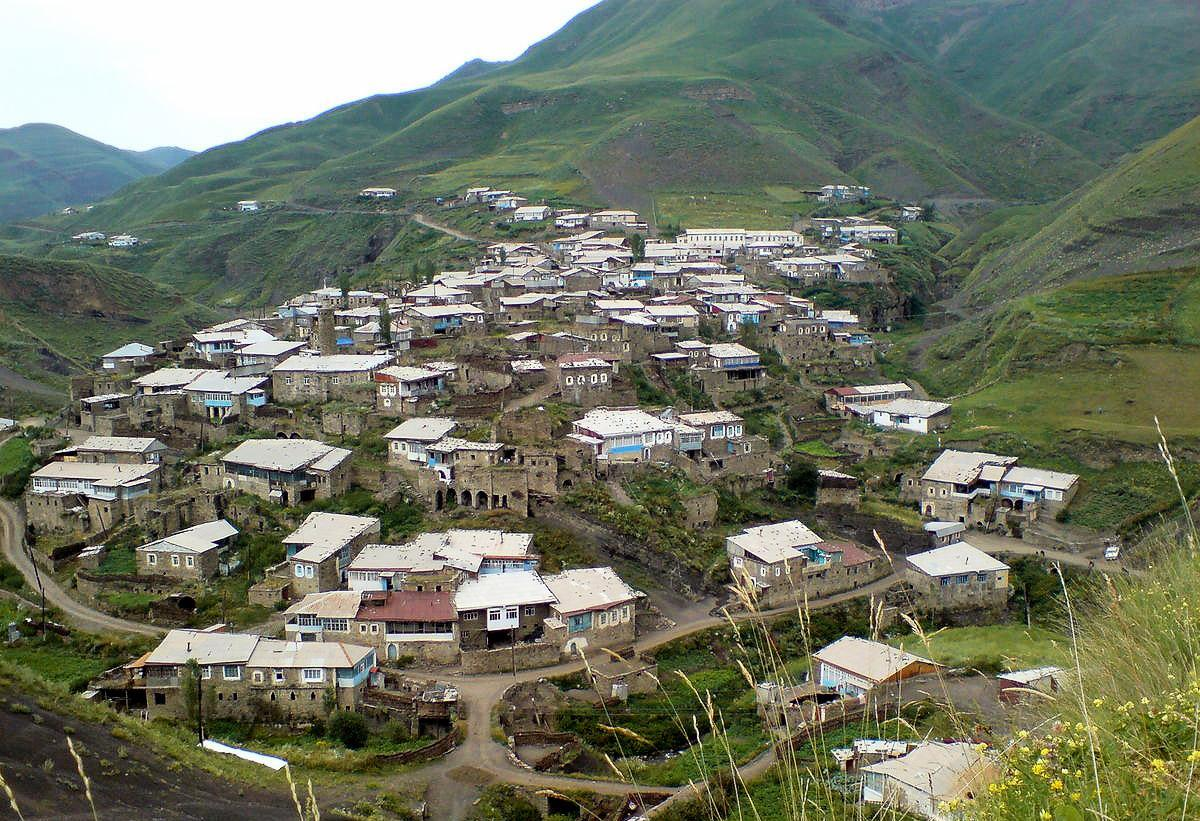

- Location within Republic of Dagestan Location within Russia
- Coordinates: 41°48′N 47°32′E
- Country: Russia
- Region: Republic of Dagestan
- District: Agulsky District
- Time zone: UTC+3:00

Burkikhan (Russian: Буркихан; Aghul: Гехъуьн) is a rural locality (a selo) in Agulsky District, Republic of Dagestan, Russia. The population was 1,194 as of 2010.

== Geography ==
Burkikhan is located 6 km northwest of Tpig (the district's administrative centre) by road. Tpig is the nearest rural locality.
