= Khosrekh =

Khosrekh Хосрех Хъусращи
- Selo
- Location within Republic of Dagestan Location within Russia
- Coordinates: 41°59′N 47°16′E
- Country: Russia
- Region: Republic of Dagestan
- District: Kulinsky District
- Time zone: UTC+3:00

Khosrekh (Russian: Хосрех; Lak: Хъусращи) is a rural locality (a selo) in Kulinsky District, Republic of Dagestan, Russia. The population was 1,630 as of 2010. There are 5 streets.

== Geography ==
Khosrekh is located 12 km southeast of Vachi (the district's administrative centre) by road. Kuli and Sumbatl are the nearest rural localities.

== Nationalities ==
Laks live there.

== Famous residents ==
- Shirvani Chalaev (composer)
- Magomed-Zagid Aminov (poet, translator)
- Omar Tataev (scientist)
