= Sogratl =

Sogratl Согратль СугъралӀ
- Selo
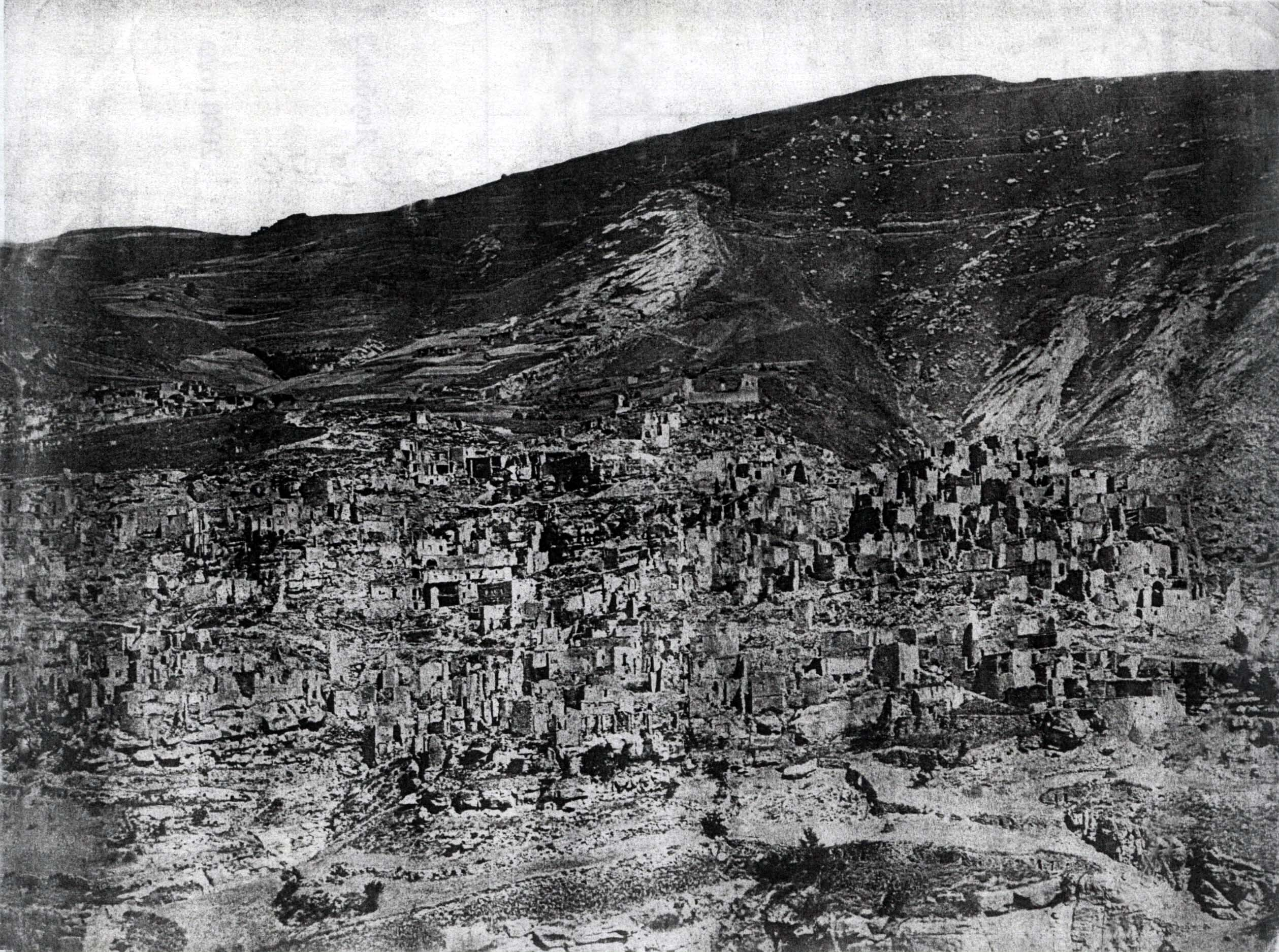
- Sogratl after it was burned in 1877

- Location within Republic of Dagestan Location within Russia
- Coordinates: 42°16′N 46°59′E
- Country: Russia
- Region: Republic of Dagestan
- District: Gunibsky District
- Time zone: UTC+3:00

Sogratl (Russian: Согратль; Avar: СугъралӀ) is a rural locality (a selo) and the administrative centre of Sogratlinsky Selsoviet, Gunibsky District, Republic of Dagestan, Russia. The population was 2,360 as of 2010. There are 4 streets.

== Geography ==
Sogratl is located 25 km south of Gunib (the district's administrative centre) by road, on the Tsamtichay River. Obokh and Shangoda are the nearest rural localities.

== Prominent People ==
• Sheikh-ul-Islam Abdurakhman-Haji as-Suguri (1792–1882);

• 4th Imam of Dagestan and Chechnya, son of Abdurakhman-Haji, Muhammad-Haji (1839–1877);

• Scholars: Mahdi-Magomed (died 1837), Haji Muhammad Haji (died 1870)

• Magomed Akhmedovich Karimov, Judge of the Supreme Court of the Russian Federation
