= Vachi =

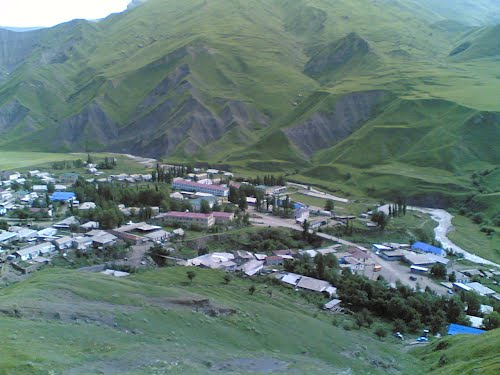

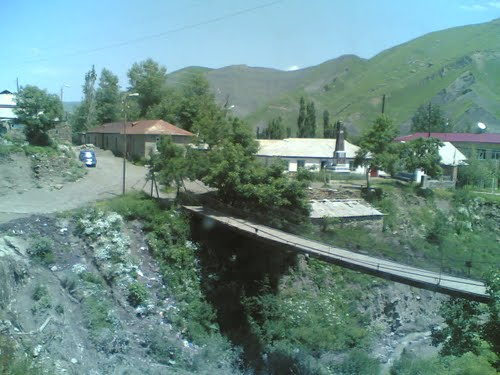

Vachi (Russian: Вачи; Lak: Ваччи) is a rural locality (a selo) and the administrative center of Kulinsky District of the Republic of Dagestan, Russia. Population: 817 (2010 census); 667 (2002 census); 786 (1989 Soviet census). The population is predominantly Lak.

== History ==
It was founded about 1,500 years ago, and was perhaps named after King Vache of Caucasian Albania. Vachi was famous for talented artisans: shoemakers, tailors, tinsmith, blacksmith who traveled to the lowlands of Dagestan and other regions of the Caucasus. In 1926, an elementary school opened in Vachi.

== Miscellaneous ==
Dialing code: +7 87268.
