= Kulinsky District =

Kulinsky District Кулинский район (Russian)
- District

Other transcription(s)
  - Lak: Ккуллал кIану
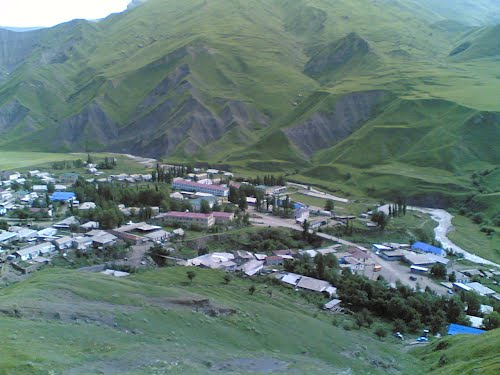
- Vachi, in Kulinsky District

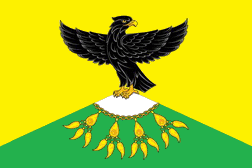
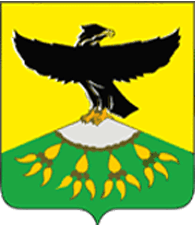
- Flag Coat of arms
- Location of Kulinsky District in the Republic of Dagestan
- Coordinates: 42°04′N 47°13′E
- Country: Russia
- Federal subject: Republic of Dagestan
- Established: 1935
- Administrative center: Vachi

Area
  - Total: 649 km^{2} (251 sq mi)

Population (2010 Census)
  - Total: 11,174
  - Density: 17.2/km^{2} (44.6/sq mi)
  - Urban: 0%
  - Rural: 100%

Administrative structure
  - Administrative divisions: 2 Selsoviets
  - Inhabited localities: 14 rural localities

Municipal structure
  - Municipally incorporated as: Kulinsky Municipal District
  - Municipal divisions: 0 urban settlements, 12 rural settlements
- Time zone: UTC+3 (MSK)
- OKTMO ID: 82629000
- Website: http://www.kulirayon.ru

Population of Kulinsky District
- 2010 Census: 11,174
- 2002 Census: 10,760
- 1989 Census: 10,455
- 1979 Census: 13,237

Kulinsky District (Russian: Кулинский райо́н; Lak: Ккуллал кIану) is an administrative and municipal district (raion), one of the forty-one in the Republic of Dagestan, Russia. It is located in the south of the republic. The area of the district is 649 square kilometers (251 sq mi). Its administrative center is the rural locality (a selo) of Vachi. As of the 2010 Census, the total population of the district was 11,174, with the population of Vachi accounting for 7.3% of that number.

== Administrative and municipal status ==
Within the framework of administrative divisions, Kulinsky District is one of the forty-one in the Republic of Dagestan. The district is divided into two selsoviets which comprise fourteen rural localities. As a municipal division, the district is incorporated as Kulinsky Municipal District. Its two selsoviets are incorporated as twelve rural settlements within the municipal district. The selo of Vachi serves as the administrative center of both the administrative and municipal district.

== Demographics ==
Kulinsky and Laksky Districts are the territory where Lak people predominantly live. There is also a historical Mountain Jewish presence in Kulinsky.

== See also ==
- History of the Lak people
