= Bagikla =

Rural locality in Russia

Bagikla Багикла Бахӏикӏул
- Selo
- Location within Republic of Dagestan Location within Russia
- Coordinates: 42°15′N 47°07′E
- Country: Russia
- Region: Republic of Dagestan
- District: Laksky District
- Time zone: UTC+3:00

Bagikla (Russian: Багикла; Lak: Бахӏикӏул) is a rural locality (or selo) in Kuminsky Selsoviet, Laksky District, Republic of Dagestan, Russia.

In 2010, the population was 85. There is 1 street.

== Geography ==
Bagikla is located 16 km (9.9 mi) north of the district's administrative centre Kumukh, on the Kazikumukhskoye Koysu river. Kuma and Shakhuva are the nearest rural localities.
