= Kara, Republic of Dagestan =

Rural locality in Russia

Kara Кара Чӏара
- Selo
- Location within Republic of Dagestan Location within Russia
- Coordinates: 42°17′N 47°10′E
- Country: Russia
- Region: Republic of Dagestan
- District: Laksky District
- Time zone: UTC+3:00

Kara (Russian: Кара; Lak: Чӏара) is a rural locality (or selo) in Laksky District, Republic of Dagestan, Russia.

In 2010, the population was 529. There are 9 streets.

== Geography ==
Kara is located 26 km (16 mi) northeast of the district's administrative centre Kumukh by road. Kundy and Kuma are the nearest rural localities.
