= Guymi =

Rural locality in Russia

Guymi Гуйми Гьуйми
- Selo
- Location within Republic of Dagestan Location within Russia
- Coordinates: 42°13′N 47°11′E
- Country: Russia
- Region: Republic of Dagestan
- District: Laksky District
- Time zone: UTC+3:00

Guymi (Russian: Гуйми; Lak: Гьуйми) is a rural locality (or selo) in Karashinsky Selsoviet, Laksky District, Republic of Dagestan, Russia.

In 2010, the population was 69. There is 1 street.

== Geography ==
Guymi is located 36 km (22 mi) northeast of the district's administrative centre Kumukh, on the Karashinskaya river. Karasha and Unchukatl are the nearest rural localities.
