= Churtakh =

Rural locality in Russia

Churtakh Чуртах Чӏурттащи
- Selo
- Location within Republic of Dagestan Location within Russia
- Coordinates: 42°06′N 47°05′E
- Country: Russia
- Region: Republic of Dagestan
- District: Laksky District
- Time zone: UTC+3:00

Churtakh (Russian: Чуртах; Lak: Чӏурттащи) is a rural locality (or selo) in Kulushatsky Selsoviet, Laksky District, Republic of Dagestan, Russia.

In 2010, the population was 167. There are 9 streets.

== Geography ==
Churtakh is located 9 km (5.6 mi) south of the district's administrative center, Kumukh, on the Kazikumukhskoye Koysu river. Khurkhi and Shara are the nearest rural localities.
