= Gushchi, Republic of Dagestan =

Rural locality in Russia

Gushchi Гущи Гьущи
- Selo
- Location within Republic of Dagestan Location within Russia
- Coordinates: 42°09′N 47°05′E
- Country: Russia
- Region: Republic of Dagestan
- District: Laksky District
- Time zone: UTC+3:00

Gushchi (Russian: Гущи; Lak: Гьущи) is a rural locality (or selo) in Kubrinsky Selsoviet, Laksky District, Republic of Dagestan, Russia.

In 2010, the population was 66. There is 1 street.

== Geography ==
Gushchi is located 3 km (1.9 mi) southwest of the district's administrative centre Kumukh, on the Chitturdanikh river. Chitur and Kubra are the nearest rural localities.
