= Govkra =

Rural locality in Russia

Govkra Говкра Гьувкӏур
- Selo
- Location within Republic of Dagestan Location within Russia
- Coordinates: 42°07′N 47°07′E
- Country: Russia
- Region: Republic of Dagestan
- District: Laksky District
- Time zone: UTC+3:00

Govkra (Russian: Говкра; Lak: Гьувкӏур) is a rural locality (or selo) in Shovkrinsky Selsoviet, Laksky District, Republic of Dagestan, Russia.

In 2010, the population was 73.

== Geography ==
Govkra is located 4 km (2.5 mi) south of the district's administrative district Kumukh, on the left bank of the Kazikumukhskoye Koysu river. Khurukra and Shovkra are the nearest rural localities.
