= Khulisma =

Khulisma Хулисма Ххюлуссун
- Selo
- Location within Republic of Dagestan Location within Russia
- Coordinates: 42°05′N 47°03′E
- Country: Russia
- Region: Republic of Dagestan
- District: Laksky District
- Time zone: UTC+3:00

Khulisma (Russian: Хулисма; Lak: Ххюлуссун) is a rural locality (or selo) in Laksky District, Republic of Dagestan, Russia.

In 2010, the population was 312.

== Geography ==
Khulisma is located 13 km (8.1 mi) southwest of the district's administrative center Kumukh by road, on the Artsalinekh River. Khurkhi and Burshi are the nearest rural localities.

== Notable people ==
- Musa Abacharayev (Doctor of Technical Sciences)
- Said-Omari Kallayev (Doctor of Physical and Mathematical Sciences)
- Malik Gafurov (Doctor of Physical and Mathematical Sciences)
- Azha Gaydarova (Doctor of Medical Sciences)
