= Khuri, Republic of Dagestan =

Rural locality in Russia

Khuri Хури Хьур
- Selo
- Location within Republic of Dagestan Location within Russia
- Coordinates: 42°10′N 47°07′E
- Country: Russia
- Region: Republic of Dagestan
- District: Laksky District
- Time zone: UTC+3:00

Khuri (Russian: Хури; Lak: Хьур) is a rural locality (or selo) and the administrative centre of Khurinsky Selsoviet, Laksky District, Republic of Dagestan, Russia.

In 2010, the population was 518. There are 3 streets.

== Geography ==
Khuri is located 141 km (88 mi) southwest of Makhachkala and 2 km (1.2 mi) northeast of the district's administrative centre Kumukh by road, on the Kazikumukhskoye Koysu River. Kumukh and Khurukra are the nearest rural localities.

== Notable people ==
- Mikail Kalilov (general)
- Khayrutdin Gadzhiyev (cardiologist, doctor of medical sciences, professor, author and co-author of about 200 scientific works)
- Gabib Tsakhayev (physiologist, doctor of natural sciences, doctor of biological sciences, member of the International Academy of Cosmononautics, professor of the Lithuanian Academy of Sciences)
- Nabi Tsakhayev (doctor of medical Sciences, professor)
- Zaidat Musayeva (neurologist, doctor of medical sciences, professor)
- Gadzhi Gadzhiev (cardiologist, doctor of medical sciences, professor)

== Sights ==
- Kumukh fortress
- Mosque-museum built in 1572
- Cannons of the tsarist army of the 18th century
- Mausoleum "Musa katta"
- Vacilou mount
