= Chitur =

Rural locality in Russia

Chitur Читур Читтур
- Selo
- Location within Republic of Dagestan Location within Russia
- Coordinates: 42°08′N 47°06′E
- Country: Russia
- Region: Republic of Dagestan
- District: Laksky District
- Time zone: UTC+3:00

Chitur (Russian: Читур; Lak: Читтур) is a rural locality (or selo) in Kulushatsky Selsoviet, Laksky District, Republic of Dagestan, Russia.

In 2010, the population was 100. There are 4 streets.

== Geography ==
Chitur is located 4 km (2.5 mi) southwest of the district's administrative centre Kumukh, on the Chitturdanikh river. Kulushats and Kubra are the nearest rural localities.
