= Khuna =

Rural locality in Russia

Khuna Хуна Хъунайми
- Selo
- Location within Republic of Dagestan Location within Russia
- Coordinates: 42°10′N 47°09′E
- Country: Russia
- Region: Republic of Dagestan
- District: Laksky District
- Time zone: UTC+3:00

Khuna (Russian: Хуна; Lak: Хъунайми) is a rural locality (or selo) and the administrative centre of Khuninsky Selsoviet, Laksky District, Republic of Dagestan, Russia.

In 2010, the population was 180.

== Geography ==
Khuna is located 2 km (1.2 mi) east of the district's administrative center Kumukh by road, on the Khunnikh River. Turtsi and Shuni are the nearest rural localities.
