= Shuni =

Shuni may refer to:

== Places ==
- Shuni, Republic of Dagestan, village in Russian Federation
- Shuni in Binyamina, Israel, former Kfar Shuni or Shami (3rd century CE), Khirbat Miyāmās or Shuni (1902) in Arabic

== People & characters ==
- Shuni (biblical figure)

== See also ==
- Shuna / Shunah / Shuneh
- Shunem, biblical village
  - woman of Shunem/Shunammite woman
- Shuni-e, Buddhist ceremony in Japan
