= Ubra =

Ubra Убра Увур
- Selo
- Location within Republic of Dagestan Location within Russia
- Coordinates: 42°10′N 47°06′E
- Country: Russia
- Region: Republic of Dagestan
- District: Laksky District
- Time zone: UTC+3:00

Ubra (Russian: Убра; Lak: Увур) is a rural locality (a selo) in Kumukshy Selsoviet, Laksky District, Republic of Dagestan, Russia. The population was 44 as of 2010. There is 1 street.

== Geography ==
Ubra is located 7 km northwest of Kumukh (the district's administrative centre) by road. Kumukh and Khuri are the nearest rural localities.

== Nationalities ==
Laks live there.

== Famous residents ==
- Miyasat Muslimova (publicist, translator and literary critic)
