= Uri, Republic of Dagestan =

Uri Ури Урими
- Selo
- Location within Republic of Dagestan Location within Russia
- Coordinates: 42°12′N 47°00′E
- Country: Russia
- Region: Republic of Dagestan
- District: Laksky District
- Time zone: UTC+3:00

Uri (Russian: Ури; Lak: Урими) is a rural locality (a selo) in Urinsky Selsoviet, Laksky District, Republic of Dagestan, Russia. The population was 153 as of 2010.

== Geography ==
Uri is located 16 km northwest of Kumukh (the district's administrative centre) by road, on the left bank of the Kunikh River. Mukar and Kurkhi are the nearest rural localities.

== Nationalities ==
Laks live there.

== Famous residents ==
Omar Azizov (senior militia lieutenant, awarded the Order of Courage)
