= Mukar, Republic of Dagestan =

Mukar Мукар Мукьар
- Selo
- Location within Republic of Dagestan Location within Russia
- Coordinates: 42°12′N 47°01′E
- Country: Russia
- Region: Republic of Dagestan
- District: Laksky District
- Time zone: UTC+3:00

Mukar (Russian: Мукар; Lak: Мукьар) is a rural locality (a selo) in Urinsky Selsoviet, Laksky District, Republic of Dagestan, Russia. The population was 220 as of 2010.

== Geography ==
Mukar is located 15 km northwest of Kumukh (the district's administrative centre) by road, on the right bank of the Kunikh River. Uri and Khuty are the nearest rural localities.
