= Lakhir =

Lakhir Лахир Лахъир
- Selo
- Location within Republic of Dagestan Location within Russia
- Coordinates: 42°10′N 47°10′E
- Country: Russia
- Region: Republic of Dagestan
- District: Laksky District
- Time zone: UTC+3:00

Lakhir (Russian: Лахир; Lak: Лахъир) is a rural locality (a selo) in Khuninsky Selsoviet, Laksky District, Republic of Dagestan, Russia. The population was 44 as of 2010.

== Geography ==
Lakhir is located 12 km east of Kumukh (the district's administrative centre) by road. Turtsi and Khuna are the nearest rural localities.

== Nationalities ==
Laks live there.
