= Kurla, Republic of Dagestan =

Kurla Курла Къурул
- Selo
- Location within Republic of Dagestan Location within Russia
- Coordinates: 42°11′N 47°11′E
- Country: Russia
- Region: Republic of Dagestan
- District: Laksky District
- Time zone: UTC+3:00

Kurla (Russian: Курла; Lak: Къурул) is a rural locality (a selo) in Khuninsky Selsoviet, Laksky District, Republic of Dagestan, Russia. The population was 79 as of 2010.

== Geography ==
Kurla is located about 15km northeast of Kumukh (the district's administrative centre) by road. Shuni and Turtsi are the nearest rural localities.

== Nationalities ==
Laks live there.
