= Kundakh =

Kundakh Кундах Хъуннащи
- Selo
- Location within Republic of Dagestan Location within Russia
- Coordinates: 42°05′N 47°05′E
- Country: Russia
- Region: Republic of Dagestan
- District: Laksky District
- Time zone: UTC+3:00

Kundakh (Russian: Кундах; Lak: Хъуннащи) is a rural locality (a selo) in Khurkhinsky Selsoviet, Laksky District, Republic of Dagestan, Russia. The population was 34 as of 2010.

== Geography ==
Kundakh is located 19 km northeast of Kumukh (the district's administrative centre) by road, on the right bank of the Kazikumukhskoye Koysu River. Kuma and Bagikla are the nearest rural localities.

== Nationalities ==
Laks live there.
