= Nadyr Khachiliev =

Russian Dagestani politician (1959 - 2003)

Nadirshakh Khachilayev
- Надиршах Хачилаев
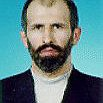
- Official portrait, 1996

Member of the State Duma
- In office 28 December 1996 – 11 September 1998
- Preceded by: Gamid Gamidov
- Succeeded by: Gadzhi Makhachev
- Constituency: Makhachkala

Personal details
- Born: 10 June 1959 Kuma, Dagestan ASSR, Russian SFSR, Soviet Union
- Died: 12 August 2003 (aged 44) Makhachkala, Dagestan, Russia
- Cause of death: Assassination by firearm
- Children: 6

Military service
- Allegiance: Soviet Union
- Branch/service: Soviet Army

Nadirshakh Mugadovich "Nadir" Khachilayev (Russian: Надиршах Мугадович Хачилаев, alternatively Nadyr Khachiliev, Nadir Khachiliev; 10 June 1959 – 12 August 2003) was a Russian Dagestani politician who served as a member of the Russian State Duma 1996 to 1998. He led a brief uprising against the Russian government in 1998, for which he was removed from the Duma and arrested, although he was later released.

He was chairman of the Dagestan branch of the Fund for Peace and the Union of Muslims of Russia, which was designated as an extremist organization by the Ministry of Justice of Russia. In the 1990s and 2000s, he was considered the leader of the Lak people. Khachiliev was assassinated in 2003.

== Early life and career ==
Born on 10 June 1959 in the village of Kuma, Laksky District, Dagestan ASSR to a family of ethnic Lak shepherds. His brothers Magomed (1957–2000) and Adam (1966–1993) were karatekas. In 1977, after graduating from high school, Nadir worked as a shepherd.

He served in the Soviet Army on the territory of modern-day Belarus and Ukraine. In 1980 he moved to Leningrad, where he joined the city karate team. He had a black belt in karate. In 1983 he studied for one year at the translation department of the Maxim Gorky Literature Institute, and then transferred to the correspondence department, from which he graduated in 1987. In addition, he studied at the Krasnodar State Institute of Physical Culture and at the Lesgaft Institute.

== Political activity ==
In Moscow, he worked for the Hermes security company, which provided debt collection. In February 1996 with the support of Abdul-Vahed Niyazov, Khachilayev headed the Union of Muslims of Russia, replacing the mufti Mukaddas Bibarsov. Later, this organization was recognized as extremist by the Russian Ministry of Justice.

In 1996, he accompanied the Secretary of the Security Council of Russia Alexander Lebed during his peacekeeping trip to Chechen separatist leaders. On 8 December 1996, in a by-election to the 2nd State Duma of Russia Khachilayev won the Makhachkala constituency. On 21 March 1997, he was admitted to Our Home – Russia faction. Khachilayev participated in the release of more than 50 hostages taken by Chechen separatists in the late 1990s.

Khachiliev was ideologically a supporter of Pan-Caucasianism and Pan-Islamism, being among the leading advocates for the unification of the North Caucasus under an independent Islamic state alongside Movladi Udugov and Zelimkhan Yandarbiyev.

=== Connection to the Egyptian Islamic Jihad ===
In 1996–1997, when Egyptian Islamic Jihad members Ayman al-Zawahiri, Ahmad Salama Mabruk and Mahmud Hisham al-Hennawi were detained in Makhachkala, Dagestan, Khachiliev was an advocate of their release. Khachiliev denied helping any imprisoned Arabs, and denied any ties to extremism.

=== 1998 Makhachkala riot ===
On 20 May 1998 a motorcade of Khachilayev brothers, returning from Chechnya, was stopped for a document check by police officers in the center of Makhachkala. Their attempt to disarm the Khachilayevs' guards led to a shootout, during which one of the police officers was killed. Nadir Khachilayev then barricaded himself at home, together with some of his supporters. On 21 May, at a rally gathered by supporters of the Khachilayevs on the central square of Makhachkala near the building of the State Council, there was another shootout with police officers. The rally resulted in the storming of government building. Magomed Khachilayev and his supporters held it for 24 hours while negotiations were held. During the clashes, several police officers were killed, and four policemen were captured by the Khachilayevs' supporters. The Prosecutor General's office accused Nadir and Magomed Khachilayev of the seizure of the State Council building, and after 11 September 1998, the State Duma deprived Nadir Khachilayev of parliamentary immunity. Magomed was arrested.

== Criminal prosecution ==
Nadir Khachilayev was hiding in Chechnya and in the Wahhabi enclave in Karamakhi. In October 1999, he was arrested by a special force unit. However, Khachilaev's lawyers stated that he was detained in Moscow, where he arrived at the invitation of the FSB to negotiate his mediation in the release of General Gennady Shpigun, who was abducted in March 1999 and was held captive by Islamists. In June 2000, Nadirshakh and Magomed Khachilayev were found guilty of organizing hostage-taking and illegal possession of weapons and sentenced by the Supreme Court of Dagestan to 18 months and 3 years in prison respectively and 41,000 rubles in a fine. However, both were released in the courtroom by the amnesty on Victory Day.

In January 2002, Khachilayev was detained in Makhachkala. The prosecutor's office considered him perpetrator of the January 18 bombing of a truck with Internal Troops servicemen, which killed seven people. Operatives seized weapons and ammunition found in Khachilayev's house, as well as video tapes of abuse of Russian Army servicemen. At the same time, the official representative of Dagestan FSB branch expressed bewilderment at the actions of the police officers, saying that they did not inform the FSB, which was conducting a criminal case. On January 25, Khachilayev went on a hunger strike. On 11 March 2002, he was fully acquitted by the Sovetsky District Court of Makhachkala.

== Death ==
On 11 August 2003, Nadirshah Khachilayev was assassinated near his own house in Makhachkala, when he was getting out of his Toyota Land Cruiser. Shots were fired from a passing VAZ-21099 car. A day later it was found on Parkhomenko Street, where the mansion of Khachilayev's longtime opponent is located, then-mayor Said Amirov. Among the versions of the murder were the alleged return of Nadir to politics, as well as blood feud: in May 1998, five OMON servicemen had been killed in a shootout near Khachilayev's house.
