= Burshi =

Rural locality in Russia

Burshi Бурши
- Selo
- Location within Republic of Dagestan Location within Russia
- Coordinates: 42°01′N 47°03′E
- Country: Russia
- Region: Republic of Dagestan
- District: Laksky District
- Time zone: UTC+3:00

Burshi (Russian: Бурши) is a rural locality (or selo) and the administrative centre of Burshinsky Selsoviet, Laksky District, Republic of Dagestan, Russia. The village was brought to fame by Islam Makhachev, who was born in Makhachkala but grew up in Burshi.

In 2010, the population was 211. There is 1 street.

== Geography ==
Burshi is located 23 km (14 mi) south of Kumukh (the district's administrative centre) by road, on the Artsalinekh River. The village is located among the Caucasus mountains in Russia. Khulisma is the nearest rural locality.

== Demographics ==
Burshi is predominantly inhabited by the Lak people. The population is Muslim.

== Notable people ==
- Islam Makhachev, mixed martial artist, current UFC Welterweight Champion, former UFC Lightweight Champion
