= Khurkhi =

Rural locality in Russia

Khurkhi Хурхи Хъурхъи
- Selo
- Location within Republic of Dagestan Location within Russia
- Coordinates: 42°06′N 47°07′E
- Country: Russia
- Region: Republic of Dagestan
- District: Laksky District
- Time zone: UTC+3:00

Khurkhi (Russian: Хурхи; Lak: Хъурхъи) is a rural locality (or selo) and the administrative centre of Khurkhinsky Selsoviet, Laksky District, Republic of Dagestan, Russia.

In 2010, the population was 684. There are 5 streets.

== Geography ==
Khurkhi is located 9 km (5.6 mi) south of the district's administrative centre Kumukh by road, on the Khunnikh River. Tulizma and Shara are the nearest rural localities.
