= Al-Shunah al-Shamalyah =

Al-Shuna al-Shamalyah الشونة الشمالية
- Town
- Location within Jordan
- Coordinates: 32°36′36″N 35°36′29″E
- PAL: 207/224
- Country: Jordan

Population
  - Total: 25,000

Al-Shunah al-Shamalyah (Arabic: الشونة الشمالية, lit. North Shuna), is a town located in northwestern Jordan in the Irbid Governorate, overlooking the Jordan River Valley. The town sits at the intersection of Highway 65 and Highway 10, and lies just south of the confluence of Yarmouk and Jordan rivers.

== Etymology ==
Shunah translates in the region's Arabic to "barn". Shunah is also spelled Shuneh and Shuna.

The Arabic definite article al when followed by certain consonants undergoes assimilation to the latter, so that in cases like this, al is sounded ash, also spelled esh, yielding here ash-Shunah/esh-Shuneh. Likewise al-Shamalyah is often rendered ash-Shamaliyah/esh-Shamaliyeh.

For the beginning of place-names, at least when reproduced in English, common convention allows for the definite article to be dropped, yielding here Shunah (Shuneh/Shuna).

Sham is Arabic for "north", and al-shamaliyah means "northern". Therefore, Al-Shunah al-Shamaliyah translates to, and is often rendered in English, as "North Shuna" or "Northern Shuna". Another place called Shunah, a village located at the opposite, southern end of the Jordan Valley, is known as South Shuna.

== Demographics ==
The Jordanian census of 1961 found 3,462 inhabitants in Al-Shuna al-Shamalyah, while the website www.arabs48.com mentions 25,000 inhabitants in 2014.

== Sites ==
=== Tell esh-Shuneh (North) ===
In 1953, archaeologists Henri de Contenson and James Mellaart excavated the site of Tell esh-Shuneh esh-Shamaliyyeh (Tell Shuneh North), overlooking the Wadi el-'Arab, just outside of the city. The site was re-excavated in the 1980s by Carrie Gustavson-Gaube and again in the 1990s by Durham University. The artifacts recovered from Tell esh-Shuneh (North) include remains of structures, pottery, and silver dating from the Chalcolithic and Early Bronze Age. Excavations also uncovered numerous macrobotanical remains, suggesting that both Chalcolithic and Early Bronze Age settlements at the site utilized agricultural irrigation.

=== Shrine of Muadh ibn Jabal ===
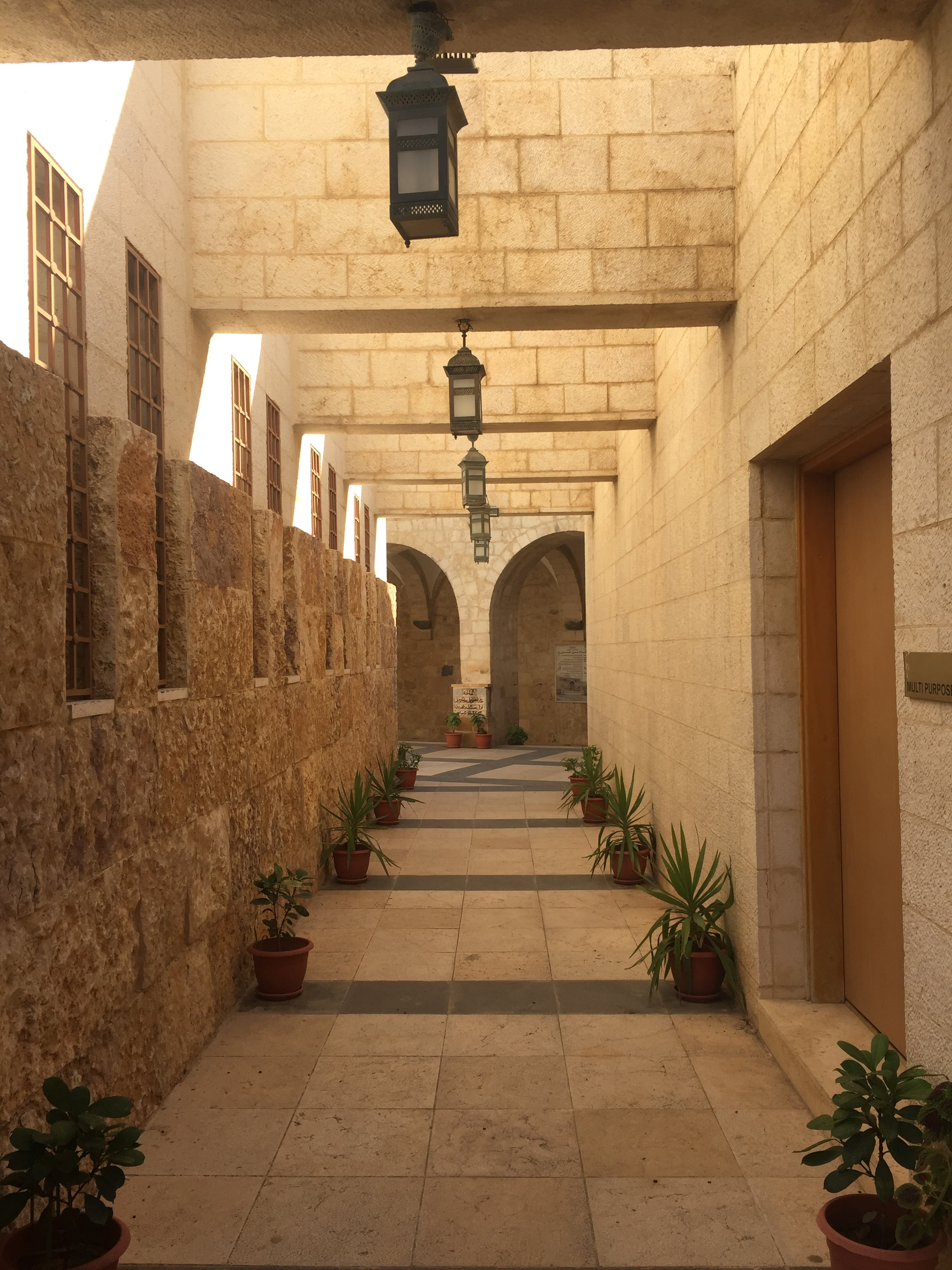
Shrine of Muadh ibn Jabal

The tomb of Muadh Ibn Jabal (official name in Arabic: مقام الصحابي الجليل معاذ بن جبل رضي الله عنه, romanized: The shrine of the great companion Muadh bin Jabal, may God be pleased with him), a prominent Sahabah of Muhammad and compiler of the Quran, is located in Al-Shuna al-Shamalya. The tomb is noted for its pleasant, yet allegedly unexplained smell.

North Shuna used to be called Shunat Muadhi due to its proximity to the tomb of Muadh ibn Jabal.

== See also ==
- Shuna (disambiguation)
  - Ash-Shunah al-Janubiyah / South Shuna, at the opposite end of Jordan's Jordan Valley

== Bibliography ==
- First Census of Population and Housing. Volume I: Final Tables; General Characteristics of the Population (PDF). Government of Jordan, Department of Statistics. 1964.
