= Shovkra =

Shovkra Шовкра Шавкӏул
- Selo
- Location within Republic of Dagestan Location within Russia
- Coordinates: 42°08′N 47°07′E
- Country: Russia
- Region: Republic of Dagestan
- District: Laksky District
- Time zone: UTC+3:00

Shovkra (Russian: Шовкра; Lak: Шавкӏул) is a rural locality (a selo) and the administrative centre of Shovkrinsky Selsoviet, Laksky District, Republic of Dagestan, Russia. The population was 581 as of 2010. There are 6 streets.

== Geography ==
Shovkra is located 3 km south of Kumukh (the district's administrative centre) by road, on the left bank of the Kazikumukhskoye Koysu River. Govkra and Chitur are the nearest rural localities.

== Nationalities ==
Laks live there.
