= British occupation of the Jordan Valley =

Occupation of the Jordan Valley
- Part of the Middle Eastern theatre of World War I
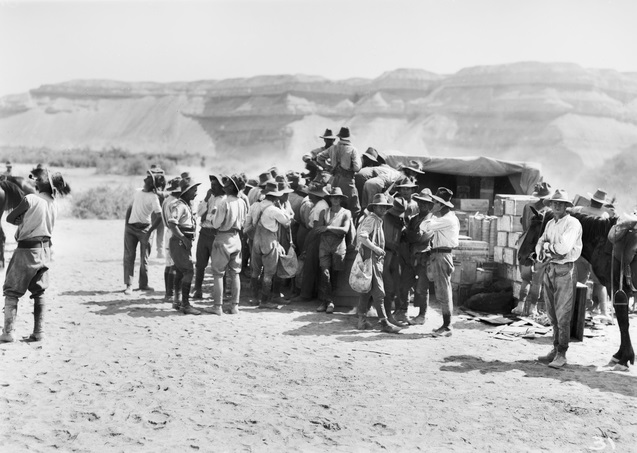
- Australian Imperial Force (AIF) Canteen in the Jordan Valley
Date	February to September 1918
Location	South western section of the Jordan Valley between the Dead Sea and the Wadi Auja
Result	British victory

Belligerents
British Empire: United Kingdom; British India	Ottoman Empire; German Empire

Commanders and leaders
(United Kingdom) Edmund Allenby (Australia) Harry Chauvel	(German Empire) Otto Liman von Sanders (Ottoman Empire) Mohammed Jemal Pasha

Units involved
Desert Mounted Corps	Fourth Army

The occupation of the Jordan Valley by the Egyptian Expeditionary Force (EEF) began in February 1918 during the Sinai and Palestine Campaign of World War I. After the Capture of Jericho in February the Auckland Mounted Rifle Regiment began patrolling an area of the Jordan Valley near Jericho at the base of the road from Jerusalem. Towards the end of March the First Transjordan attack on Amman and the First Battle of Amman were launched from the Jordan Valley followed a few weeks later by the equally unsuccessful Second Transjordan attack on Shunet Nimrin and Es Salt at the end of April. During this time the occupation of the Jordan was fully established and continued through the summer of 1918. The occupation ended in September with the Battle of Megiddo which consisted of the Battle of Sharon and the Battle of Nablus. The Third Transjordan attack and Second Battle of Amman were fought as part of the Battle of Nablus.

Despite the difficult climate and the unhealthy environment of the Jordan Valley, General Edmund Allenby decided that, to ensure the strength of the EEF's front line it was necessary to extend the line which stretched from the Mediterranean, across the Judean Hills to the Dead Sea to protect his right flank. This line was held until September, providing a strong position from which to launch the attacks on Amman to the east and northwards to Damascus.

During the period from March to September the Ottoman Army held the hills of Moab on the eastern side of the valley and the northern section of valley. Their well placed artillery periodically shelled the occupying force and, particularly in May, German aircraft bombed and strafed bivouacs and horse lines. As a consequence of the major victory at Megiddo the occupied area was consolidated with other former Ottoman Empire territories won during the battle.

== Background ==
Detail of Falls Sketch Map No. 24 showing Jericho, Wadi Nueiame, Wadi el Auja, Wadi el Mellaha, El Musallabe, Bakr Ridge, El Baghalat, Kh Fasail, Meteil edn Dhib, El Musetter, and the fords from El Ghoraniye, to Umm esh Shert, Mafid Jozele and Jisr ed Damieh with the entrenched Shunet Nimrin position to the east overlooked by El Haud to the north east

After the capture of Jerusalem at the end of 1917 the Jordan River was crossed by infantry and mounted riflemen and bridgeheads established at the beginning of the unsuccessful first Transjordan attack on Amman in March. The defeat of the second Transjordan attack on Shunet Nimrin and Es Salt and the withdrawal to the Jordan Valley on 3 to 5 May, marked the end of major operations until September 1918.

The focus shifted to the German spring offensive launched by Ludendorff on the Western Front, which began the same day as the First Transjordan attack on Amman, completely eclipsing its failure. The British front in Picardy held by 300,000 soldiers collapsed when powerful assaults were launched on both sides of the Somme by a force of 750,000, forcing Gough's Fifth Army back almost to Amiens. On one day; 23 March German forces advanced 12 miles (19 km) and captured 600 guns; in total 1,000 guns and 160,000 suffered the worst defeat of the war. The British War Cabinet recognised at once that the overthrow of the Ottoman Empire must be at least postponed. The effect of this offensive on the Palestine Campaign was described by Allenby on 1 April 1918: "Here, I have raided the Hedjaz railway 40 miles East of Jordan & have done much damage but my little show dwindles now into a very insufficient [insignificant] affair in comparison with events in Europe." Overnight Palestine went from being the British government's first priority to a "side show."

=== Decision to occupy the valley ===
Reasons for garrisoning the Jordan Valley include – The road from the Hedjaz railway station at Amman to Shunet Nimrin opposite the Ghoraniyeh crossing of the Jordan River, remained a serious strategic threat to the British right flank as a large German and Ottoman force could very quickly be moved from Amman to Shunet Nimrin and a major attack mounted into the valley. (Note: The Ghoraniyeh bridgehead was just 15 miles (24 km) from Jerusalem direct. [Maunsell 1926 p. 194])

1. The plan for the advance in September required holding the Jordan bridgeheads and maintaining a continuous threat of another offensive across the Transjordan.
2. The mobility of the mounted force kept alive the possibility of a third Transjordan attack on this flank and their endurance of the terrible heat, may have confirmed the enemy's assumption, that the next advance would come in this sector of the front line.
3. The implied threat of a large mounted force which was constantly active in whatever part of the front line Desert Mounted Corps was based raised enemy expectations of a fresh attack being mounted in that area.
4. A withdrawal of Lieutenant General Harry Chauvel's force from the valley to the heights may have been contemplated but the lost territory would have to be re–taken before the proposed September operations.
5. Despite the huge numbers of sick projected to be suffered during the occupation of the Jordan Valley, the re-taking of the valley may have been more costly than holding it.
6. If a retreat out of the Jordan Valley took place, the alternative position in the wilderness overlooking the Jordan Valley was insufficient in either space or water to accommodate the Desert Mounted Corps.
7. A retreat out of the valley would enhance the already increased morale of the German and Ottoman forces and their standing in the region, following their Transjordan victories.
8. Normally mounted troops would be held in reserve, but Allenby did not think there were enough available infantry divisions to hold his front line while the radical reorganisation of the Egyptian Expeditionary Force was being carried out.

It therefore was decided to defend the eastern flank from the Jordan valley with a strong garrison until September and to occupy a place many considered to be an unpleasant and unhealthy place and virtually uninhabitable during the hot summer months due to the heat, high humidity and malaria.

So important was the support of Prince Feisal's Sherifial Hedjaz Arab force to the defence of the EEF's right flank, that they were substantially subsidised by the War Office. After a delay in receipt of a payment, the High Commissioner in Egypt Reginald Wingate wrote to Allenby on 5 July 1918, "I think we shall manage the subsidy required as well as the extra £50,000 you require for Northern Operations." At the time £400,000 was on its way from Australia, while Wingate was asking the War Office for an additional £500,000, emphasising the importance of the regular "payment of our Arab subsidy."

The Ottoman defenders maintained an observation post on El Haud hill which dominates the whole Jordan Valley.

Ottoman Force June 1918
	Rifles	Sabres	Machine guns	Art.Rifles [sic]
East of Jordan	8050	2375	221	30
VII Army	12850	750	289	28
VIII Army	15870	1000	314	1309
North Palestine Line of Communications	950	–	6	–

At this time the strength was estimated at 68,000 rifles and sabres and morale of the Ottoman defenders very strong, the harvest coming in and food abundant. While the EEF was defending its line with every available unit. As Allenby wrote in a letter to the War Office on 15 June 1918, "all my goods are in the shop window." The 60 miles (97 km) EEF line stretching from the Mediterranean Sea to the Jordan River was strong, supported by roads and communications behind. However the line was wide in comparison with the size of the EEF it. Allenby saying, "It is the best line I can hold. Any retirement would weaken it. My right flank is covered by the Jordan; my left by the Mediterranean Sea. The Jordan Valley must be held by me; it is vital. If the Turks regained control of the Jordan, I should lose control of the Dead Sea. This would cut me off from the Arabs on the Hedjaz railway; with the result that, shortly, the Turks would regain their power in the Hedjaz. The Arabs would make terms with them, and our prestige would be gone. My right flank would be turned, and my position in Palestine would be untenable. I might hold Rafa or El Arish; but you can imagine what effect such a withdrawal would have on the population of Egypt, and on the watching tribes of the Western Desert. You see, therefore, that I cannot modify my present dispositions. I must give up nothing of what I now hold. Anyhow, I must hold the Jordan Valley."

=== Garrison ===
Chauvel was given the task of defending the Jordan Valley, but his Desert Mounted Corps had lost the 5th Mounted Brigade and the Yeomanry Mounted Division, both of which, along with most of the British infantry were sent to the Western Front to be replaced by Indian Army infantry and cavalry. This resultant reorganisation required time to work through.

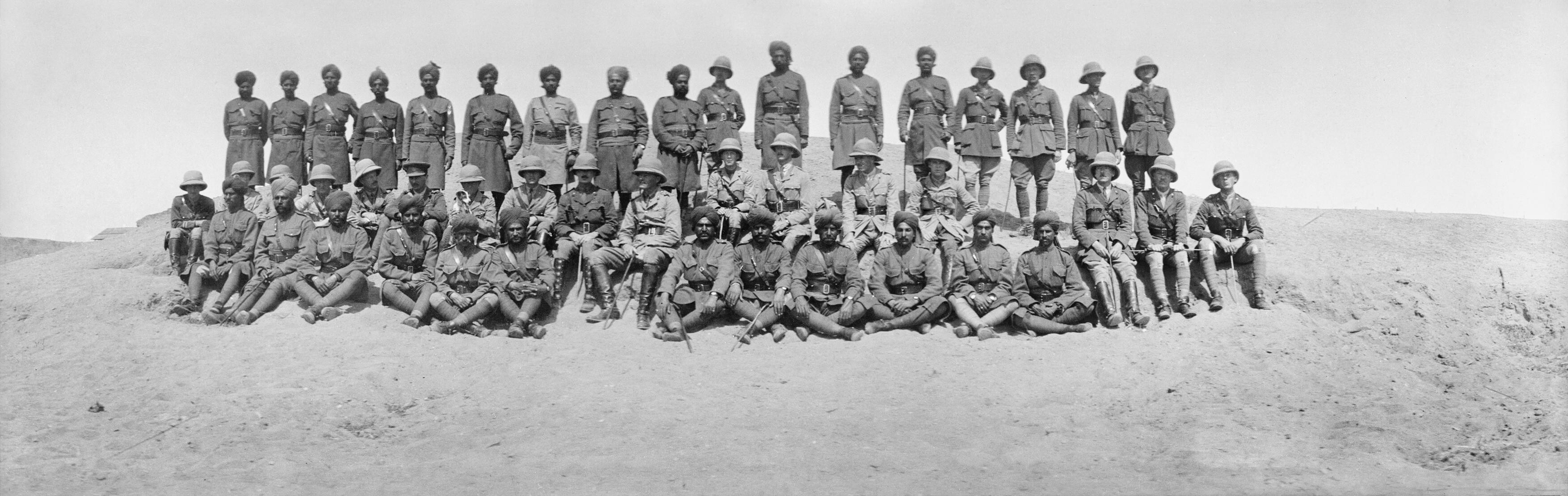
British and Indian officers of the 18th Lancers (India Army) at Tel el Kebir on arrival from France in April 1918.

The Jordan Valley was garrisoned in 1918 by the 20th Indian Brigade, the Anzac Mounted Division and the Australian Mounted Division, until 17 May when the 4th and 5th Cavalry Divisions arrived. They took over the outposts in the sector outside the Ghoraniyeh bridgehead while the 15th (Imperial Service) Cavalry Brigade held the bridgehead. (Note: The two Imperial Service brigades (one infantry and one cavalry fielded by Indian Princely States) had seen service in the theatre since 1914; from the defence of the Suez Canal onwards. [Falls 1930 Vol. 2 Part II p. 424]) In August these troops were joined at the beginning of the month by the newly formed 1st and 2nd Battalions British West Indies Regiment, in the middle of the month by the 38th Battalion, Royal Fusiliers (the 39th would follow later), both part of the Jewish Legion and towards the end of August by British Indian Army cavalry units. This force included a section of the Light Armoured Motor Brigade commanded by Captain McIntyre; the armoured cars had two machine guns mounted on the rear of each car and were camouflaged with bushes while making sorties to attack Ottoman patrols. Allenby had decided to hold the valley with this mainly mounted force because the mobility of mounted troops would enable them to keep the greater proportion of their strength in reserve on the higher ground.

Chauvel's headquarters were at Talaat ed Dumm from 25 April until 16 September and he divided the Jordan Valley into two sectors, each patrolled by three brigades while a reserve of three brigades was maintained.

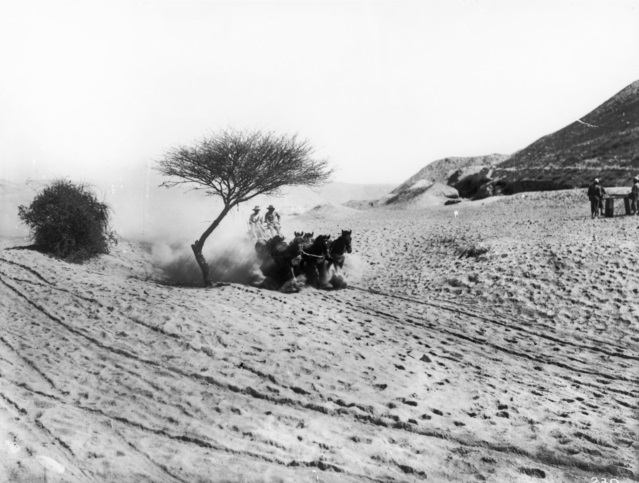
An Australian Light Horse team on a road near Jericho.

In the garrisoned area of the valley there were two villages; Jericho and Rujm El Bahr on the edge of the Dead Sea; other human habitations included the Bedouin shelters and several monasteries. Arabs chose to evacuate Jericho during the summer months, leaving only the heterogeneous local tribes. In the vicinity of the Dead Sea, the Taamara, a 7,000 strong semi-settled Arab tribe cultivated selected areas of the slopes of the Dead Sea about Wady Muallak and Wady Nur. They husbanded 3,000 sheep, 2,000 donkeys and a few large cattle or camels and travelled to the Madeba district to work as hired carriers.

=== Conditions in the valley ===
At 1,290 feet (390 m) below sea level and 4,000 feet (1,200 m) below the mountains on either side of the scorching Jordan Valley, here for weeks at a time, the shade temperature rarely dropped below 100 °F (38 °C) and occasionally reached 122–125 °F (50–52 °C); at the Ghoraniyeh bridgehead 130 °F (54 °C) was recorded. Coupled with the heat, the tremendous evaporation of the Dead Sea which keeps the still, heavy atmosphere moist, adds to the discomfort and produces a feeling of lassitude which is most depressing and difficult to overcome. In addition to these unpleasant conditions the valley swarms with snakes, scorpions, mosquitoes, great black spiders, and men and animals were tormented by day and night by swarms of every sort of fly. Trooper R. W. Gregson 2663, described the Jordan Valley to his family, "...it's a terrible place. I will never tell anyone to go to hell again; I will tell him to go to Jericho, and I think that will be bad enough!"

From Jericho the Jordan River was invisible, about 4 miles (6.4 km) across the almost open plain; being very good going for movement across the valley. Big vultures perch on the chalky bluffs overlooking the river, and storks are seen flying overhead, while wild pigs were seen in the bush. The river contained many fish, and its marshy borders were crowded with frogs and other small animals.

In the spring the land in the Jordan Valley supports a little thin grass, but the fierce sun of early summer quickly scorches this leaving only a layer of white chalky marl impregnated with salt, several feet deep. This surface was soon broken up by the movement of mounted troops into a fine white powder resembling flour, and covering everything with a thick blanket of dust. Roads and tracks were often covered with as much as 1 foot (30 cm) of white powder and traffic stirred this up into a dense, limey cloud which penetrated everywhere, and stuck grittily to sweat-soaked clothes. A white coating of dust would enshroud men returning from watering their horses; their clothes, wet with perspiration which sometimes dripped from the knees of their riding-breeches, and their faces only revealed by sweaty rivulets.

During the summer the nights are breathless, but in the early morning a strong hot wind, blowing from the north, sweeps the white dust down the valley in dense choking clouds. By about 11:00 the wind dies down, and a period of deathlike stillness follows, accompanied by intense heat. Shortly afterwards a wind sometimes arises from the south, or violent air currents sweep the valley, carrying "dust devils" to great heights; these continue till about 22:00 after which sleep is possible for a few brief hours.

The troops' general careworn appearance was very noticeable; they were not actually ill but lacked proper sleep and the effects of this deprivation were intensified by the heat, dust, humidity, pressure effect, stillness of the air, and mosquitoes which together with the cumulative effects of the hardships of the two previous years of campaigning caused a general depression. These extremely depressing effects of the region in turn contributed to the debility of troops after a period in the valley. Their shelter was most often just bivouac sheets which barely allowed the men room to sit up; there were a few bell tents in which temperatures reached 125 °F (52 °C). However, although they worked long hours in the hot sun patrolling, digging, wiring, caring for the horses and carrying out anti-mosquito work, heat exhaustion was never a problem (as it had in the Sinai desert; in particular on the second day of the Battle of Romani) as there was easy access to large supplies of pure, cool water for drinking and washing. Springs supplied drinking water and supplies of rations and forage were transported to the valley from Jerusalem. But thirst was constant and very large quantities of fluid; more than 1 imperial gallon (4.5 L) were consumed, while meat rations (in the absence of refrigeration) consisted mainly of tins of "bully beef", which was often stewed by the hot conditions while still in the cans, and bread was always dry and there were few fresh vegetables.

=== Vegetation ===
The bush ranged from 4 feet (1.2 m) to the height of a horse; there were numerous Ber trees which have enormous thorns (the traditional "crown of thorns" tree) and big prickly bushes which made it quite easy to rig up shelter from the sun, and near Jericho a woody scrub 3–4 feet (0.91–1.22 m) high, with broad leaves which are woolly on the underside, has fruit similar to apples. There was dense jhow jungle on either side of the Jordan River for some 200–300 yards (180–270 m), and the banks were sheer about 5–6 feet (1.5–1.8 m) above water-level which made it impossible to swim horses in the river.

=== Swimming in the Dead Sea ===
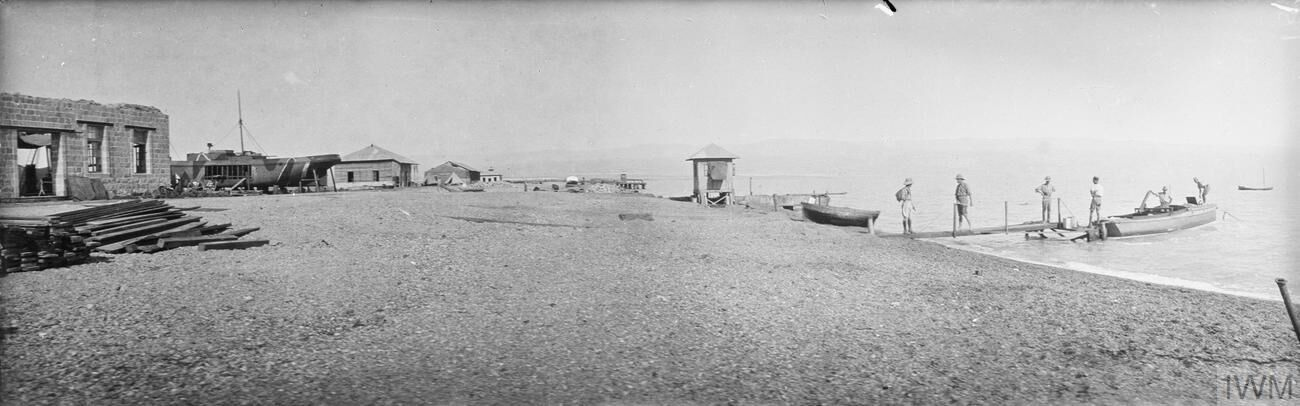
Dead Sea Post showing one of the naval whalers and a launch belonging to the Dead Sea Detachment, Motor-Boat Company, R.A.S.C. 5 September 1918.

While in bivouac in the Jordan Valley, it was a common practice when things were quiet, for soldiers to ride the few miles to Rujm El Bahr, at the northern end of the Dead Sea where the Jordan River runs in, to bathe themselves and their horses. This inland sea is about 47 miles (76 km) long and about 10 miles (16 km) wide with steep mountain country sloping down to the water on each side. The surface of the sea lies 1,290 feet (390 m) below the sea-level of the Mediterranean and the water is extremely salty, containing about 25% mineral salts and is extremely buoyant; many of the horses were obviously perplexed at floating so high out of the water. It has been calculated that 6,500,000 tons of water fall into the Dead Sea daily from various streams, and as the sea has no outlet all of this water evaporates creating the humid heat of the atmosphere in the valley. There were also opportunities to swim in the Jordan River.

=== Water supply and mosquitoes ===
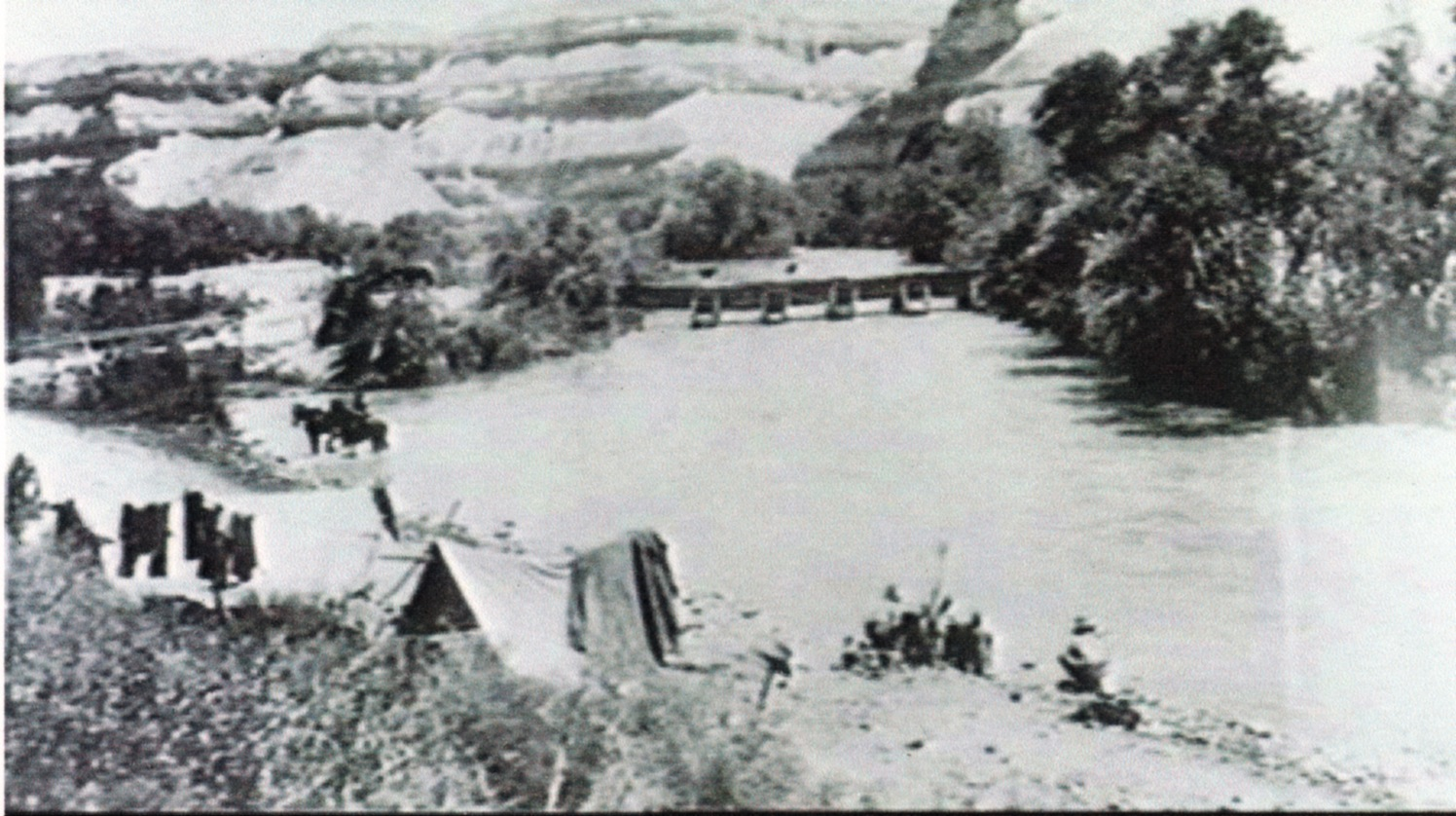
Bivouac on the Jordan River, men washing clothes and exercising horses, with pontoon bridge and the Hills of Moab in the distance

The one generous feature of the valley was its water supply; the slightly muddy Jordan River flowed strongly throughout the year in a trough about 100–150 feet (30–46 m) below the valley floor, fed by numerous clear springs and wadis running into it on either side. Most New Zealanders enjoyed the physical benefits of bathing in the Jordan at one time or another during the campaign in which a good bath was such a luxury.

In the left sector where the Australian Mounted Division was stationed there were several sources of water; the Jordan River, the Wadi el Auja, and the Wadi Nueiameh, which flowed from Ain el Duk, and into the Jordan at El Ghoraniyeh. The latter wadi was used by the Headquarters of the Valley Defences. The section of the valley patrolled by the Anzac Mounted Division was crossed by the wadis Auja, Mellahah, Nueiameh and the Kelt as well as the Jordan River with several extensive marshes in the jungle on its banks. The nullahs were astonishingly deep, usually with dense vegetation and quite big trees. The area was notorious for subtertian or malignant malaria and in particular the whole valley of the Wadi el Mellahah was swarming with anopheles larvae, the worst kind of mosquitoes.

A thousand men cut down the jungle, drained the marshes and swamps, the streams were cleared of reeds which were burnt, canals created so there was no opportunity for standing water, holes were filled in, stagnant pools were oiled and hard standings for the horses were constructed. Even a cultivated area at the source of the Ain es Sultan (Jericho's water supply) was treated by 600 members of the Egyptian Labour Corps over a period of two months. No breeding of the larvae could be demonstrated three days after the work was complete but the areas had to be continually maintained by special malarial squads of the Sanitary Section and the Indian Infantry Brigade. These measures were successful as during the six months to September the incidence of malaria in Chauvel's force was just over five per cent with most cases occurring on the front line or in No Man's Land; while incidence of malaria in the reserve areas was very low.

However, despite all efforts, cases of malaria were reported during May and reports of fever steadily developed as the heat and dust increased and the men became less physically fit which lowered their ability to resist sickness. In addition to malaria, minor maladies became very common; thousands of men suffered from blood diseases known as "sand-fly fever" and "five-day fever", which manifested in excessive temperatures, followed by temporary prostration, and few escaped severe stomach disorders.

=== Conditions for the horses ===
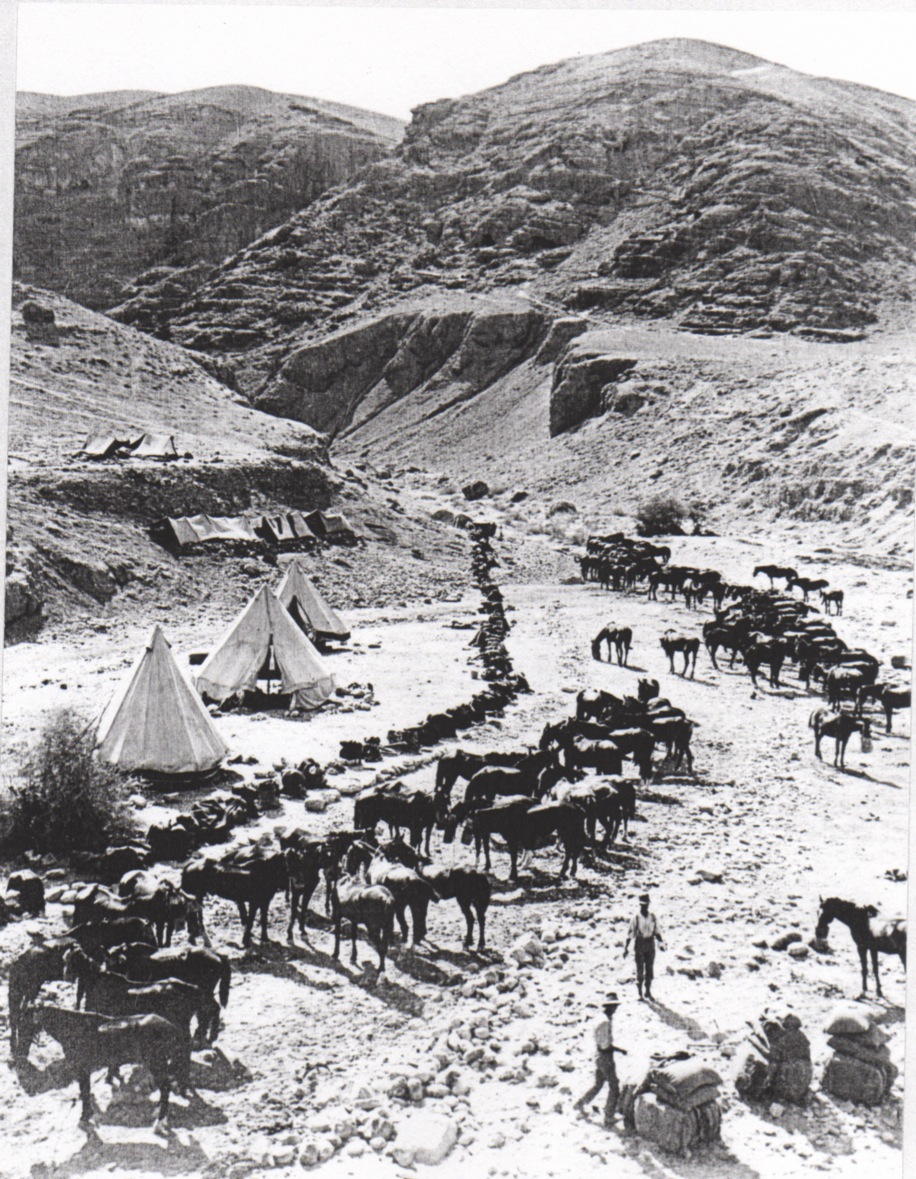
Horse lines of "A" Squadron 9th Light Horse Regiment (3rd Light Horse Brigade)

The climate did not affect the horses in a marked way but their rations, although plentiful, contained only a small proportion of pure grain with insufficient nutritional value and was too bulky and unpalatable. While others thought the forage was "all that could be desired" and water was plentiful and good. During mid summer when iron was too hot to handle and a hand placed on the back of a horse was positively painful, yet in the dust, the heat and the many diseases, in particular Surra fever which carried by the Surra fly which, in 1917 decimated the Ottoman transport killing as many as 42,000 camels in the Jordan Valley, the horses survived.

They did not thrive, however, and they came out of the valley in poor condition, due mainly due to insufficient number of men to water, feed and groom them and the conditions were unfavourable for exercise, which is essential for keeping horses in good health and condition. There was on average one man to look after six or seven horses, and at times in some regiments there was only one man for every 15 horses after the daily sick had been evacuated and men for outposts, patrols and anti-malarial work had been found.

== Operations ==
=== German and Ottoman attacks in Jordan Valley, 11 April ===
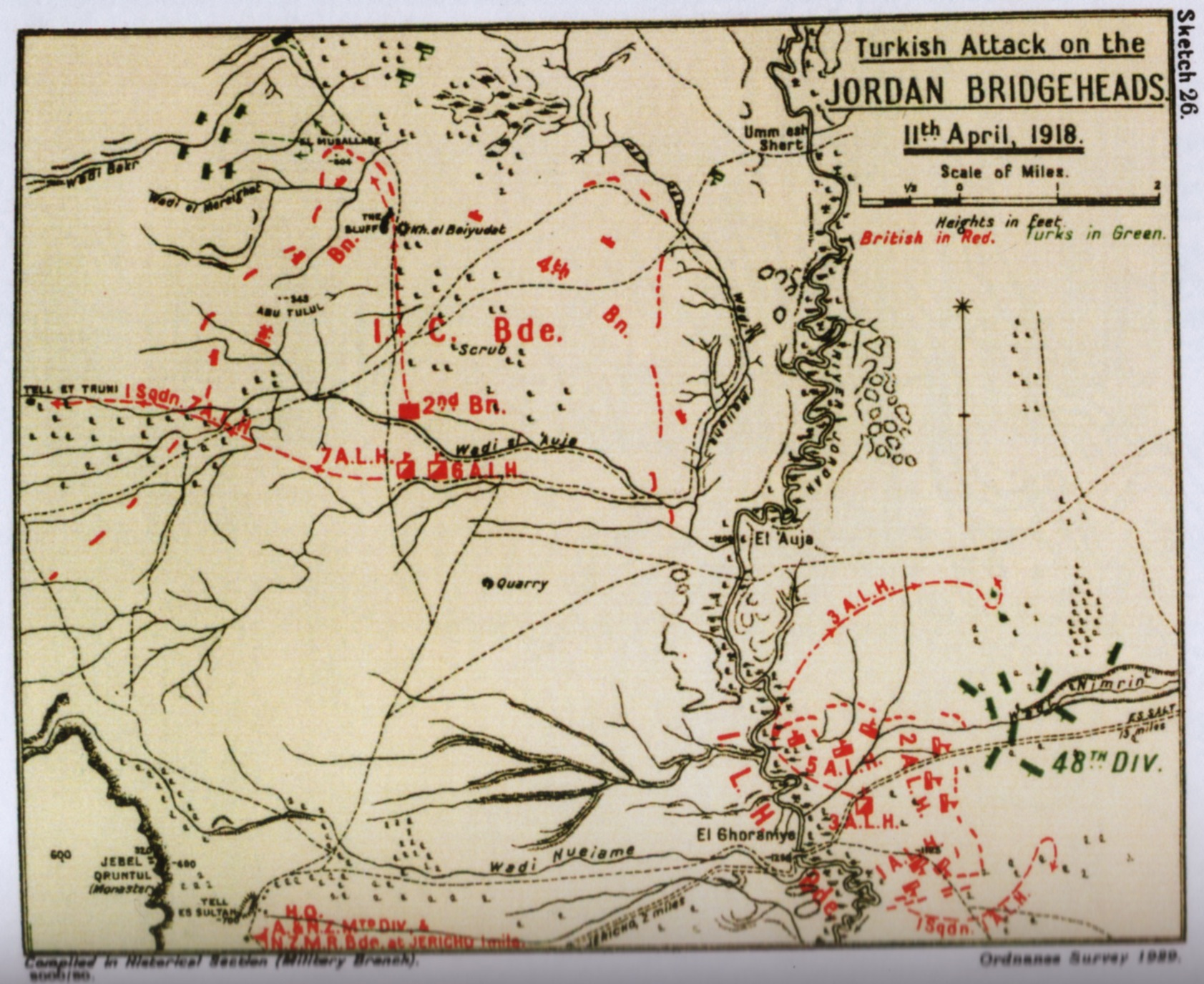
Falls map showing Ottoman attacks on the Jordan Bridgeheads, Auja and Mussallabeh

The 60th (London) Division moved back into the Judean Hills after the Amman operations while the Anzac Mounted Division and the Imperial Camel Corps Brigade remained to garrison the Jordan Valley under the command of Chaytor, the commander of the Anzac Mounted Division. When Chaytor took over command on 3 April Major he divided his force in two; one group to defend the Ghoraniyeh bridgehead from the east and the other to defend the Wadi el Auja bridgehead from the north. The group defending Ghoraniyeh comprised the 1st Light Horse Brigade, one regiment of the 2nd Light Horse Brigade and three field batteries; the group defending the Auja position including Mussallabeh hill comprised the Imperial Camel Corps Brigade, the 2nd Light Horse Brigade (less one regiment and a field artillery brigade), while the New Zealand Mounted Rifles Brigade was in reserve near Jericho. Some defensive work was carried out including wire.

Shortly after the withdrawal from Amman a force of seven Ottoman aircraft bombed the Jordan Valley garrison and on 11 April 1918 a series of Ottoman attacks were made on Ghoraniyeh bridgehead, on El Mussallabeh hill and on the Auja position. This attack is referred to by the British as the 'Turkish Attack on the Jordan Bridgeheads'.

==== Ghoraniyeh bridgehead ====
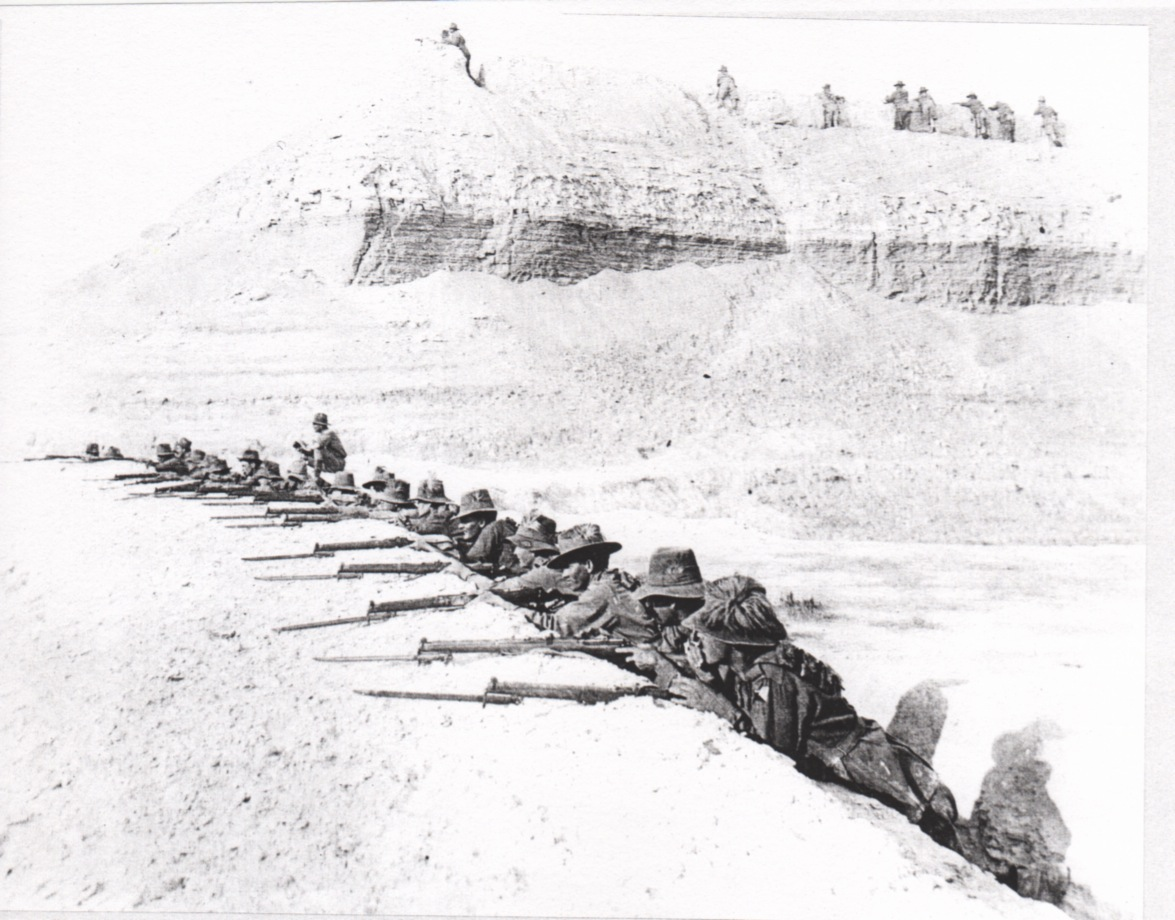
5th Light Horse Regiment at left bank outpost April 1918

This defensive position covered the bridge and consisted of trenching and barbed wire and was covered by guns from the western bank. The 1st Light Horse Brigade was heavily attacked at 04:00 by the Ottoman 48th Division. They pushed forward to within 100 yards (91 m) of the line but were heavily shelled by covering artillery and at 12:30 a regiment of light horse rode out and attacked their flank. Several attempts by the Ottoman Army to send forward reinforcements were defeated by the British gunners. During the night the Ottoman soldiers withdrew.

The British section guns were on the Pimple and the other 100 yards (91 m) to the left with the old road to the Ghoraniyeh crossing leading straight to our gun on the Pimple. At dawn a fairly large and close formation of Ottoman soldiers advanced straight at the Pimple gun which opened fire supported by light horse Hotchkiss light machine guns on the right. Although the action did not end for some hours the first 10 minutes decided it.

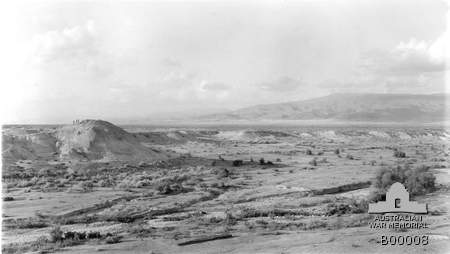
Wadi Nimrin in the Jordan Valley showing the Pimple

==== Auja position ====
German and Ottoman guns heavily shelled the lines on the Wadi Auja to the north of Jericho and the Ottoman attacks were beaten off.

==== Mussallabeh hill ====
Here the Ottoman Army launched an infantry assault by a composite force of four battalions and several batteries after an hour's bombardment. At one or two places they gained a footing, but after a day of close fighting they withdrew back to the foot of the hills of Moab, to Shunet Nimrin on the eastern side of the Jordan.

The casualties were between 500 and 2,500 Ottoman dead and 100 prisoners with Anzac Mounted Division suffering 26 killed, 65 wounded and 28 horses killed, 62 horses wounded.

=== EEF attack Shunet Nimrin ===
Chetwode (commander XX Corps) was ordered to demonstrate in force against the Shunet Nimrin position on the road from Ghoranyeh to Amman, with a view to encouraging the idea of further operations against Amman and attracting more Ottoman reinforcements to Shunet Nimrin rather than sending them against the Hedjaz Arabs at Maan.

By late April the Shunet Nimrin the garrison was about 8,000 strong and Allenby decided to attack this force to either capture it or compel it to retire. Chaytor (commander Anzac Mounted Division) was given command of the 180th Brigade, 10th Heavy Battery, 383rd Siege Battery with the 20th Indian Brigade (less two battalions) holding the Ghoraniyeh bridgehead and the Anzac Mounted Division to complete the operation. Chetwode ordered Chaytor not to commit to a general engagement but if the Ottoman Army retired to follow them up.

But on 18 April the Ottoman garrison at Shunet Nimrin produced such heavy fire that the mounted troops, including the New Zealand Mounted Rifles Brigade were unable to even approach the foothills. As a result of this operation the Ottoman Army further strengthened their position at Shunet Nimrin. On 20 April Allenby ordered Chauvel (commander Desert Mounted Corps) to take over the Jordan section of the line from Chetwode, to destroy Ottoman forces around Shunet Nimrin and to capture Es Salt.

=== German and Ottoman attack ===
On 14 July two attacks were made by German and Ottoman forces; in the hills on a salient held by Australian Light Horse which protected front line positions in the valley, where the mainly German force was routed, and a second operation to the east of the Jordan River on the plain, where an Ottoman cavalry brigade, had deployed six regiments to attack the El Hinu and Makhadet Hijla bridgeheads; they were attacked by Indian Lancers and routed.

== Tour of duty ==
Troops paraded at regimental headquarters mounted carrying ammunition and rations in preparation for a 24-hour tour of duty. After the troop leader received his orders the troop often marched in single file about 8–9 miles (13–14 km), across the deep gullies which cut the valley floor, to the Jordan River. If it was possible they would water the horses before continuing to their post, where they relieved the other troops at about 18:00 or on dusk. After any information regarding opposition movements, patrols, or posts, and new ranges to particular points, was handed over, the relieved troops returned to their regimental camp. The deployment of the troop was decided by the officer or sergeant in charge of the troop, after assessing the layout of the ground. He would decide where the horses would be located and the deployment of the troop including the Hotchkiss automatic rifle, which would be placed where it could "do the most damage." A man was detailed to lie near this automatic rifle all night, "with the first strip inserted in the breach, ready at a moment's notice." (Note: Each troop in the New Zealand Brigade carried a Hotchkiss automatic rifle, with had a section of four men trained in its use. In situations where the troop-leader often wished he had a hundred men instead of twenty-five or less, it was an invaluable weapon. The gun is air-cooled, can fire as fast as a machine-gun, but has the advantage of a single-shot adjustment, which will often enable the man behind the gun to get the exact range by single shots indistinguishable from rifle fire, and then to pour in a burst of deadly automatic fire. The gun will not stand continued use as an automatic without overheating, but despite this it is a most useful weapon, light enough to be carried by one man dismounted. On trek, or going into action, a pack-horse in each troop carried the Hotchkiss rifle, spare barrel, and several panniers of ammunition, while a reserve of ammunition was carried by another pack-horse for each two troops. The ammunition was fed into the gun in metal strips, each containing thirty rounds. [Moore 1920 p. 120]) In addition a listening post was established, which would be occupied during the night, in front of the general position, while sentries were posted, and horse-pickets allocated to guard the horses, linked together by their head-ropes, in case of emergency. Billies could then be boiled (if the smoke could be screened), rations eaten and although the horses remained saddled overnight, they could be fed.

It could be a quiet night or rifle fire with ricocheting bullets, might make for an anxious night waiting for information from the listening post. Quiet might follow, "except for the occasional restless movements of the horses, the rolling of a dislodged clod down a hillside, or the weird baying of jackals." Or after a "sinister stillness" and "a crash of rifle fire" the listening post would frantically return, reporting the direction of the opposition's attack. If it was a large scale attack, "each man would know a stern fight was before him", because if the position was to be held, it would be some hours before they could hope for reinforcements. If there had only been "a few stray shots, and perhaps the sounds of an enemy patrol moving somewhere in front" during the night, dawn would find the tired listening post creep back to their troop before the day began. If the day was quiet the saddles could be taken off, and the men and horses, relax and perhaps sleep, because with daylight only one sentry, with glasses, could keep effective watch.

It might be during the day there were opportunities to shoot at opponents if they came into range, or hostile aircraft might fly over the area, "running the gauntlet as the white puffs of shrapnel or black splotches of high explosive anti-aircraft shells burst around them thousands of feet up in the air." However, the troop could be in danger from "shrapnel, shell fragments, and nose-caps", which could "fall, with a whirring noise, from the sky" after the shells had exploded in the air. Or it might be that the opponents know about this particular post, shelling it as soon as it was light. Then "there will be a muffled roar in the distance, a whine that quickly grows to a hissing shriek, and with a shocking crash in the stillness a shell bursts near at hand." While everyone dives for cover an eye is kept on the horses without which they will have a long weary trek back to the regiment. If the shells go increasingly wide the guns will stop as the target could not be found. Later they may get a visit from an artillery officer wanting to know about any new targets, or a member of the high command may visit to familiarise "himself with all the features of the front he is responsible for." Later when a dust cloud indicates the arrival of the relieving troop, the horses are saddled, and then the order, "Get Ready to Move!"

=== German and Ottoman aerial bombing raids ===
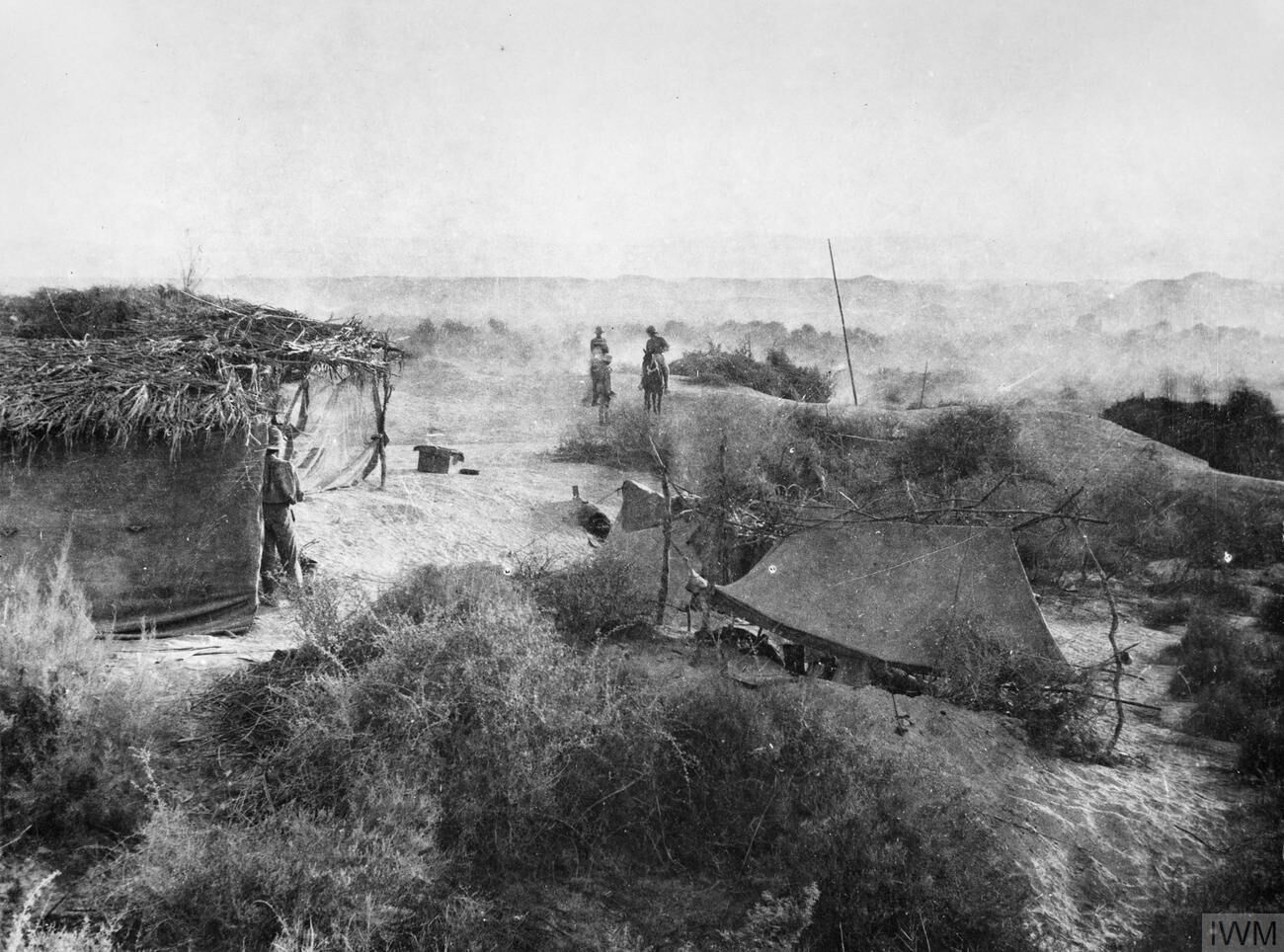
1st County of London (Middlesex) Yeomanry Camp (4th Cavalry Division) Bridgehead, Jordan, August 1918.

Bivouacs were bombed during the first few days in the Jordan Valley, but the Indian Army cavalry horse lines in the bridgehead were not attacked, either by bomb-dropping or machine-gunning. Both bivouacs and horse lines of the light horse and mounted rifle brigades were attacked. At dawn on Tuesday 7 May a big bombing raid by nine German aircraft were attacked by heavy rifle and machine gun fire. One bomb fell in the bivvies of the 4th Light Horse Field Ambulance where only two were wounded, but metal fragments riddled the tents and blankets. Stretcher bearers brought in 13 wounded in a matter of minutes and what remained of the Field Ambulance horses after the attack on 1 May at Jisr ed Damieh (see Second Transjordan attack on Shunet Nimrin and Es Salt) were only 20 yards (18 m) away and 12 were wounded and had to be destroyed. (Note: The casualty percentage for the 4th Light Horse Field Ambulance was at this time was 33% which is high for a support unit. [Hamilton 1996 p. 120])

Another raid the next morning resulted in only one casualty although more horses were hit. These bombing raids were a regular performance every morning for the first week or so; enemy aircraft flying over were attacked by anti-aircraft artillery, but they ceased after Allied aircraft bombed their aerodrome.

=== Relief of the Imperial Camel Corps Brigade ===
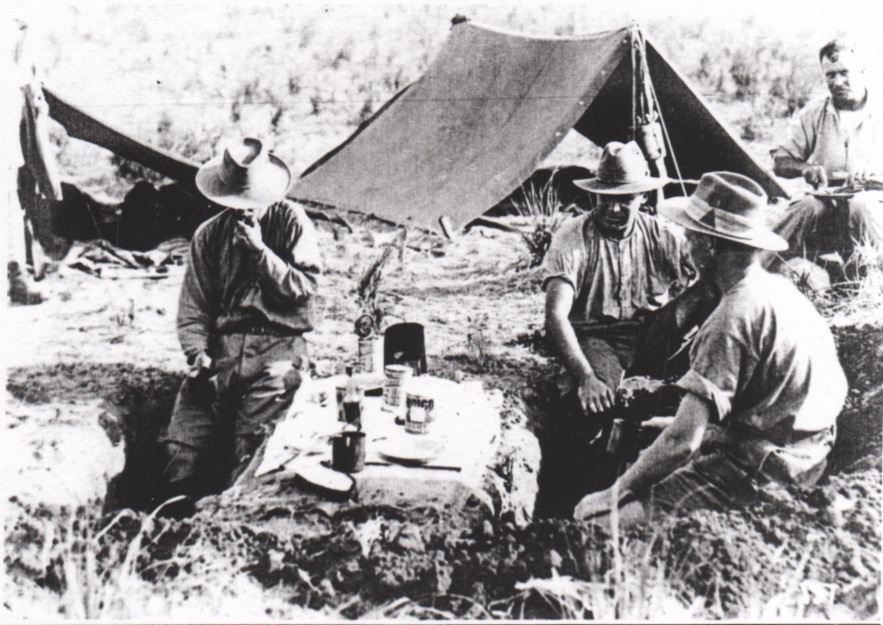
Imperial Camel Corps Brigade troopers having breakfast in a 'funk hole' near Jaffa.

On 10 May the 4th Light Horse Brigade received orders to relieve the Imperial Camel Corps Brigade.

=== Long-range German and Ottoman guns ===
Spasmodic bursts of long-range shells fired from a German naval pattern 6-inch (15 cm) gun, occurred throughout the British Empire occupation of the Jordan Valley. Some 30 shells were fired at various camps and horse lines in the neighbourhood during the first week. During June they steadily increased artillery fire on the occupied positions, freely shelled the horse lines of the reserve regiment along the Auja, and at times inflicting severe casualties.

The gun was deployed north-west of the British Empire line in the valley and shelled Ghoraniyeh, Jericho, and other back areas at a range of some 20,000 yards (18,000 m). This long-range gun was also reported firing from well disguised positions in the hills east of the Jordan River on British Empire camps and horse lines, with the benefit of reports from German Taube aircraft, with a black iron cross under each wing. The gun could fire at targets over 12 miles (19 km) away; on one occasion shelling Jericho, after which the gun was called "Jericho Jane." At the end of the war when this gun was captured, it was found to have been about 18 feet (5.5 m) long and the pointed high explosive shells and their charge-cases were nearly 6 feet (1.8 m) long. In July two more guns of a similar calibre were deployed in about the same position; north-west of the British Empire line in the valley. (Note: A similar gun used during the Gallipoli campaign had been located on the Asiatic side of the Dardanelles and had been known as "Asiatic Annie." [McPherson 1985 p. 139])

==== Ottoman artillery – July reinforcements ====
The Ottoman forces in the hills overlooking the Jordan Valley received considerable artillery reinforcement early in July, and pushed a number of field guns and heavy howitzers southwards, east of the Jordan, and commenced a systematic shelling of the troops. Camps and horse lines had to be moved and scattered about in sections in most inconvenient situations along the bottoms of small wadis running down from the ridge into the plain. The whole of the Wadis el Auja and Nueiameh was under the enemy's observation either from Red Hill and other high ground east of the Jordan or from the foothills west and north-west of Abu Tellul, and took full advantage of this to shell watering places almost every day even though the drinking places were frequently changed. Every effort was made to distract their attention by shelling their foothills positions vigorously, during the hours when horses were being watered. But the dense clouds of dust raised by even the smallest parties of horses on the move, generally gave the game away, and the men and horses were constantly troubled by enemy artillery and numerous times severe casualties were suffered by these watering units.

=== Air support ===
==== April and May ====
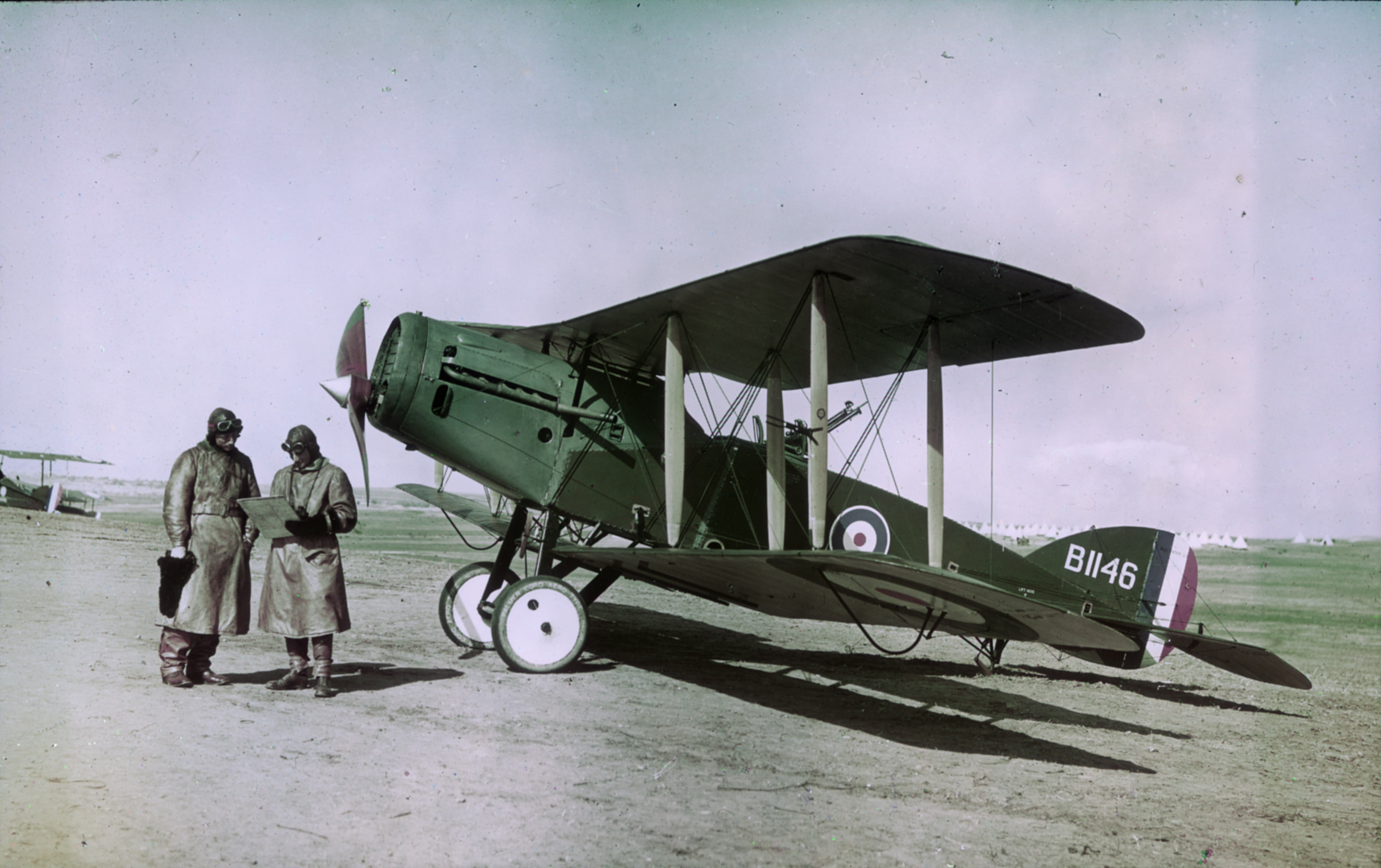
A Bristol F.2B Fighter of No. 1 Squadron, Australian Flying Corps, in Palestine, February 1918. The pilot (left) is Captain Ross Macpherson Smith, who in 1919 was part of the crew that set the record for flying from England to Australia.

No 1 Squadron, Australian Flying Corps moved forward in the last week of April from Mejdel to a new aerodrome outside Ramleh to focus on the Nablus area. Reconnaissance on 7 May over the "horse-shoe" road, reported the state of all camps and discovered seven more hangars on the western of the two aerodromes at Jenin. During the return trip, two Albatros scouts over Tul Keram were force down.

Two days later on 9 May, nine British aircraft dropped nearly a ton of bombs at Jenin, destroying the surface of the landing strip and set fire to several aircraft hangars. The German No. 305 Squadron suffered damage to a number of their aircraft, but a Rumpler fought a British aircraft over Jenin aerodrome. The British also bombed the railway station at Jenin.

On 13 May nearly 200 photographs were taken by four aircraft which systematically covered the Jisr ed Damieh region, enabling a new map to be drawn. Aerial photographs were also used for new maps of Es Salt and the Samaria–Nablus region and on 8 June the first British reconnaissance of Haifa, examined the whole coast up to that place. Regular reconnaissances took place over Tul Keram, Nablus and Messudie railway stations and the Lubban–road camps on 11 and 12 June when numerous aerial engagements took place; the Bristol Fighter proving superior to the German Rumpler.

==== June ====
Jericho Map dated 6 May 1918

German aircraft often flew over the British Empire lines at the first light and were particularly interested in the Jericho and lower Jordan area where on 9 June a highflying Rumpler, was forced to land near Jisr ed Damieh, after fighting and striving during five minutes of close combat at 16,000 feet to get the advantage of the Australian pilots. These dawn patrols also visited the Lubban–road sector of the front (north of Jerusalem on the Nablus road) and the coast sector.

Increasingly the air supremacy won in May and June was used to the full with British squadrons flying straight at enemy formations whenever they were sighted while the opposition often fought only if escape seemed impracticable. The close scouting of the Australian pilots which had become a daily duty was, on the other side, utterly impossible for these German airmen who often flew so high that it is likely their reconnaissances lacked detail; owing to the heat haze over the Jordan Valley, Australian airmen found reconnaissance even at 10,000 feet difficult.

This new found British and Australian confidence led to successful machine gun attacks on Ottoman ground–troops which were first successfully carried out during the two Transjordan operations in March and April. They inflicted demoralising damage on infantry, cavalry, and transport alike as at the same time as German airmen became more and more disinclined to fly. British and Australian pilots in bombing formations first sought out other enemy to fight; they were quickly followed by ordinary reconnaissance missions when rest camps and road transport in the rear became targets for bombs and machine guns.

In mid-June British squadrons, escorted by Bristol Fighters, made three bomb raids on the El Kutrani fields dropping incendiary bombs as well as high explosives bombs, causing panic among Bedouin reapers and Ottoman cavalry which scattered, while the escorting Australians lashed with machine-gun fire the unusually busy El Kutrani railway station and a nearby train. While British squadrons were disrupted the Moabite harvest gangs, bombing raids from No. 1 Squadron were directed against the grain fields in the Mediterranean sector. On the same day of the El Kutrani raid; 16 June the squadron sent three raids, each of two machines, with incendiary bombs against the crops about Kakon, Anebta, and Mukhalid. One of the most successful dropped sixteen fire-bombs in fields and among haystacks, set them alight, and machine gunned the workers.

==== July ====
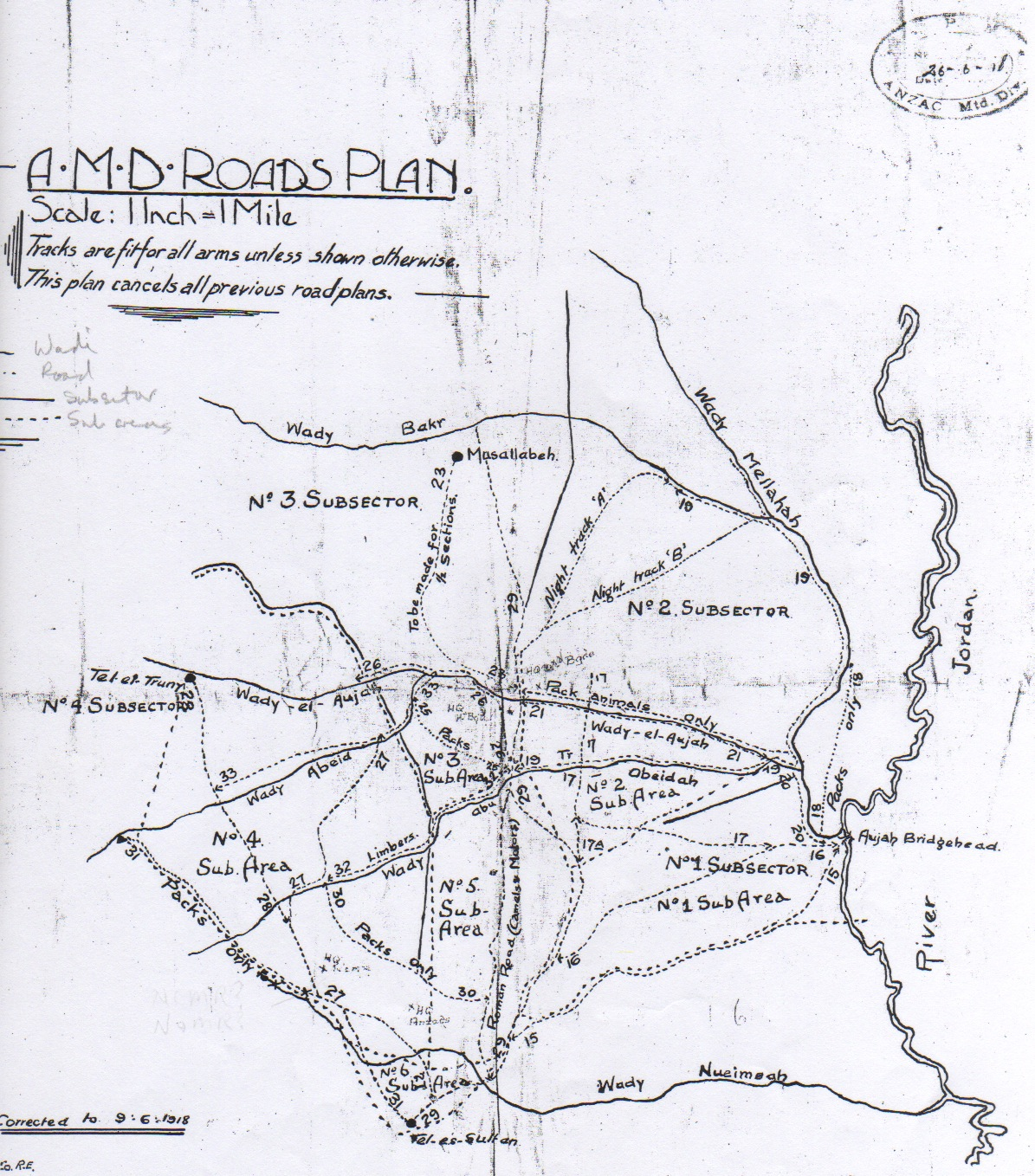
Australian Mounted Division Roads Plan

Daily observations of the regions around Nablus (headquarters of the Ottoman 7th Army) and Amman (on the Hedjaz railway) were required at this time to keep a close watch on the German and Ottoman forces' troop movements. There were several indications of increased defensive preparations on the coastal sector; improvements were made to the Afule to Haifa railway and there was increased road traffic all over this district while the trench system near Kakon was not being maintained. The smallest details of roads and tracks immediately opposite the British front and crossings of the important Nahr Iskanderun were all carefully observed.

Flights were made down the Hedjaz railway on 1 July to El Kutrani where the camp and aerodrome were strafed with machine gun fire by Australians and on 6 July at Jauf ed Derwish they found the garrison working to repair their defences and railway culverts, after the destruction of the bridges over the Wady es Sultane to the south by the Hedjaz Arabs, which cut their railway communications. When Jauf ed Derwish station north of Maan was reconnoitred, the old German aerodrome at Beersheba was used as an advance landing-ground. Also on 6 July aerial photographs were taken of the Et Tire area near the sea for the map makers. Two days later Jauf ed Derwish was bombed by a British formation which flew over Maan and found it strongly garrisoned. No. 1 Squadron's patrols watched the whole length of the railway during the first fortnight of July; on 13 July a convoy of 2,000 camels south of Amman escorted by 500 cavalry, moving south towards Kissir was machine gunned scattering the horses and camels, while three more Bristol Fighters attacked a caravan near Kissir on the same day; Amman was attacked several days later.

Several aerial combats occurred over Tul Keram, Bireh, Nablus and Jenin on 16 July and attacked a transport column of camels near Arrabe, a train north of Ramin and three Albatros scouts aircraft on the ground at Balata aerodrome. Near Amman 200 cavalry and 2,000 camels which had been attacked a few days previously, were again attacked, and two Albatros scouts were destroyed during aerial combat over the Wady el Auja.

On 22 July Australian pilots destroyed a Rumpler during a dawn patrol south west of Lubban after aerial combat and on 28 July two Bristol Fighters piloted by Australians fought two Rumpler aircraft from over the outskirts of Jerusalem to the upper Wady Fara; another Rumpler was forced down two days later.

On 31 July a reconnaissance was made from Nablus over the Wady Fara to Beisan where they machine gunned a train and a transport park near the station. Then they flew north to Semakh machine gunning troops near the railway station and aerodrome before flying back over Jenin aerodrome. During the period of almost daily patrols almost 1,000 aerial photographs were taken from Nablus and Wady Fara up to Beisan and from Tul Keram north covering nearly 400 square miles (1,000 km^{2}). Enemy troops, roads and traffic were regularly attacked even by photography patrols when flying low to avoid enemy anti-aircraft fire.

==== August ====
On 5 August the camps along the Wady Fara were counted and small cavalry movements over Ain es Sir were noted, chased down an Albatros scout and returning over the Wady Fara machine gunned a column of infantry and some camels; these camps were harassed a few days later. A formation of six new Pfalz scouts was first encountered over Jenin aerodrome on 14 August when it was found they were inferior to the Bristol aircraft in climbing ability and all six were forced after aerial combat to land. Rumpler aircraft were successfully attacked on 16 and 21 August and on 24 August a determined attack by eight German aircraft on two Bristol Fighters defending the British air screen between Tul Keram and Kalkilieh was defeated and four of the enemy aircraft were destroyed.

=== Medical support ===
Field Ambulances Work
Month	Average % weekly admitted	Average % weekly evacuated
January	0.95	0.61
February	0.70	0.53
March	0.83	0.76
April	1.85	1.71
May	1.94	1.83
June	2.38	2.14
July	4.19	3.98
August	3.06	2.91
to 14 September	3.08	2.52

In May the Anzac Field Laboratory was established 1.5 miles (2.4 km) north west of Jericho in the foothills. Shortly after, on 10 May the 4th Light Horse Field Ambulance relieved the Imperial Camel Corps Brigade Field Ambulance when daily shade temperatures in the ambulance tents were recorded between 109–110 °F (43–43 °C) going as high as 120 °F (49 °C). On Friday 31 May 1918 it was 108 °F (42 °C) in the operating tent and 114 °F (46 °C) outside in the shade. That night was close, hot and still until a wind blew clouds of dust between 02:00 and 08:00 smothered everything.

In the five weeks between 2 May and 8 June 616 sick men (one third of the 4th Light Horse Brigade) were evacuated from the 4th Light Horse Field Ambulance. During the same period, the field ambulance treated almost an equal number of patients needing dressings and for minor ailments. Some were kept in hospital for a few days. In five weeks, the field ambulance cared for the equivalent of two regiments or two-thirds of the total brigade. According to Falls, "in general, however, the Force's standard of health was very high." These minor ailments included very painful boils which were inevitable in the dust, heat and sweat of the Jordan Valley. They often started where shirt collars rubbed the backs of necks, then spread to the top of the head and possibly the arm pits and buttocks. These boils were treated by lancing or hot foments sometimes applied hourly and requiring a day or two in hospital. Foments were made from a wad of lint wrapped in a towel heated in boiling water, wrung as dry as possible then quickly slapped straight on the boil. Other maladies suffered during the occupation included dysentery, a few cases of enteric, relapsing fever, typhus, and smallpox along with sand-fly fever.

==== Malaria ====
Malaria struck during the week of 24 to 30 May and although a small percentage of men seemed to have an inbuilt resistance, many did not and the field ambulances had their busiest time ever when a very high percentage of troops got malaria; one field ambulance treated about 1,000 patients at this time.

From May onwards an increasing numbers of soldiers were struck down by malaria. Both Plasmodium vivax (benign tertian) and Plasmodium falciparum (malignant tertian), along with a few quartan forms of the infection were reported in spite of "determined, well-organised, and scientifically controlled measures of prevention."

Minor cases of malaria are kept at the field ambulance for two or three days in the hospital tents, and then sent back to their units. More serious cases, including all the malignant ones, were evacuated as soon as possible, after immediate treatment. All cases got one or more injections of quinine. Between 15 May and 24 August, the 9th and 11th Light Horse Regiments, participated in a quinine trial. Every man in one squadron of each of the two regiments was given five grains of quinine daily by mouth and the remainder none. During the trial 10 cases of malaria occurred in the treated squadrons while 80 occurred in the untreated men giving a ratio of 1:2.3 cases.

Ice began to be delivered daily by motor lorry from Jerusalem to treat the bad cases of malignant malaria; it travelled in sacks filled with sawdust, and with care lasted for 12 hours or more. Patients in the 4th Light Horse Field Ambulance were as a result, given iced drinks which to them, appeared incredible. When a serious case arrived with a temperature of 104–105 °F (40–41 °C) ice wrapped in lint was packed all round his body to practically freeze him; his temperature was taken every minute or so and, in about 20 minutes, when his temperature may have dropped to normal he was wrapped, shivering in a blanket, when the tent temperature was well over 100 °F (38 °C), and evacuated by motor ambulance to hospital in Jerusalem, before the next attack.

One such evacuee was 42-year-old trooper A. E. Illingworth, who had landed at Suez in January 1917. He joined the 4th Light Horse Regiment at Ferry Post on 3 March 1917 from Moascar training camp, and was in the field until 8 June 1918, when he became ill from pyrexia and was admitted to the 31st General Hospital, Abbassia on 15 June. After treatment he rejoined his regiment on 20 July at Jericho and remained in the field until returning to Australia on the Essex on 15 June 1919. He died five years later.

==== Evacuation from Jordan Valley to Cairo hospital ====
For the wounded and sick the trip to base hospital in Cairo 300 miles (480 km) away was a long and difficult one during which it was necessary for them to negotiate many stages.

1. From his regiment the sick man would be carried on a stretcher to the Field Ambulance, where his case would be diagnosed and a card describing him and his illness was attached to his clothing.
2. Then he would be moved to the Divisional Casualty Clearing Station, which would be a little further back in the Valley, close to the motor road.
3. From there he would be placed, with three other stretcher cases, in a motor ambulance, to make the long journey through the hills to Jerusalem, where he would arrive coated in dust.
4. In Jerusalem he would be carried into one of the two big buildings taken over by the British for use as casualty clearing stations. His medical history card would be read and treatment given him, and he might be kept there for a couple of days. (Later, when the broad-gauge line was through to Jerusalem, cases would be sent southwards in hospital train.)
5. When he was fit enough to travel, his stretcher would again make up a load in a motor ambulance to Ludd, near the coast on the railway three or four hours away over very hilly, dusty roads.
6. At Ludd the patient would be admitted to another casualty clearing station, where he would perhaps be kept another day or two before continuing his journey southwards in a hospital train.
7. The hospital train would take him to the stationary hospital at Gaza, or El Arish or straight on to Kantara.
8. After lying in a hospital at Kantara East for perhaps two or three days, he would be carried in an ambulance across the Suez Canal to Kantara West.
9. The last stage of his journey from the Jordan Valley to a base hospital in Cairo was on the Egyptian State Railways.

==== Rest camp ====
During the advance from southern Palestine the system of leave to the Australian Mounted Division's Rest Camp at Port Said was stopped. It started again in January 1918, and throughout the occupation of the Jordan Valley quotas averaging about 350 men were sent there every ten days. This gave the men seven days clear rest, in very good conditions.

As a result of the benefits of the Rest Camp on the beach at Tel el Marakeb demonstrated before the Third Battle of Gaza, Desert Mounted Corps established an Ambulance Rest Station in the grounds of a monastery at Jerusalem. This was staffed by personnel from the immobile sections of Corps ambulances. Tents and mattresses and food extras were provided along with games, amusements, and comforts supplied by the Australian Red Cross. The men sent to this rest camp, included those run down or debilitated after minor illnesses. The troops were housed in conditions which were as different as possible from the ordinary regimental life.

==== Return trip from rest camp to the Jordan ====
The return journey was very different from coming down in a hospital train as a draft usually travelled at night, in practically open trucks with about 35 men packed into each truck including all their kits, rifles, 48 hours' rations, and a loaded bandolier. They would arrive at Ludd in the morning after a sleepless night in a bumping, clanking train where they would have time for a wash and a scratch meal before moving on by train to Jerusalem where the draft would be accommodated for perhaps a night or two at the Desert Mounted Corps rest camp, 1 mile (1.6 km) or so from the station. From there they would be despatched in motor lorries down the hill to Jericho, where led horses would be sent in some miles, from the brigade bivouac, to meet them and carry them back to their units.

== Reliefs ==
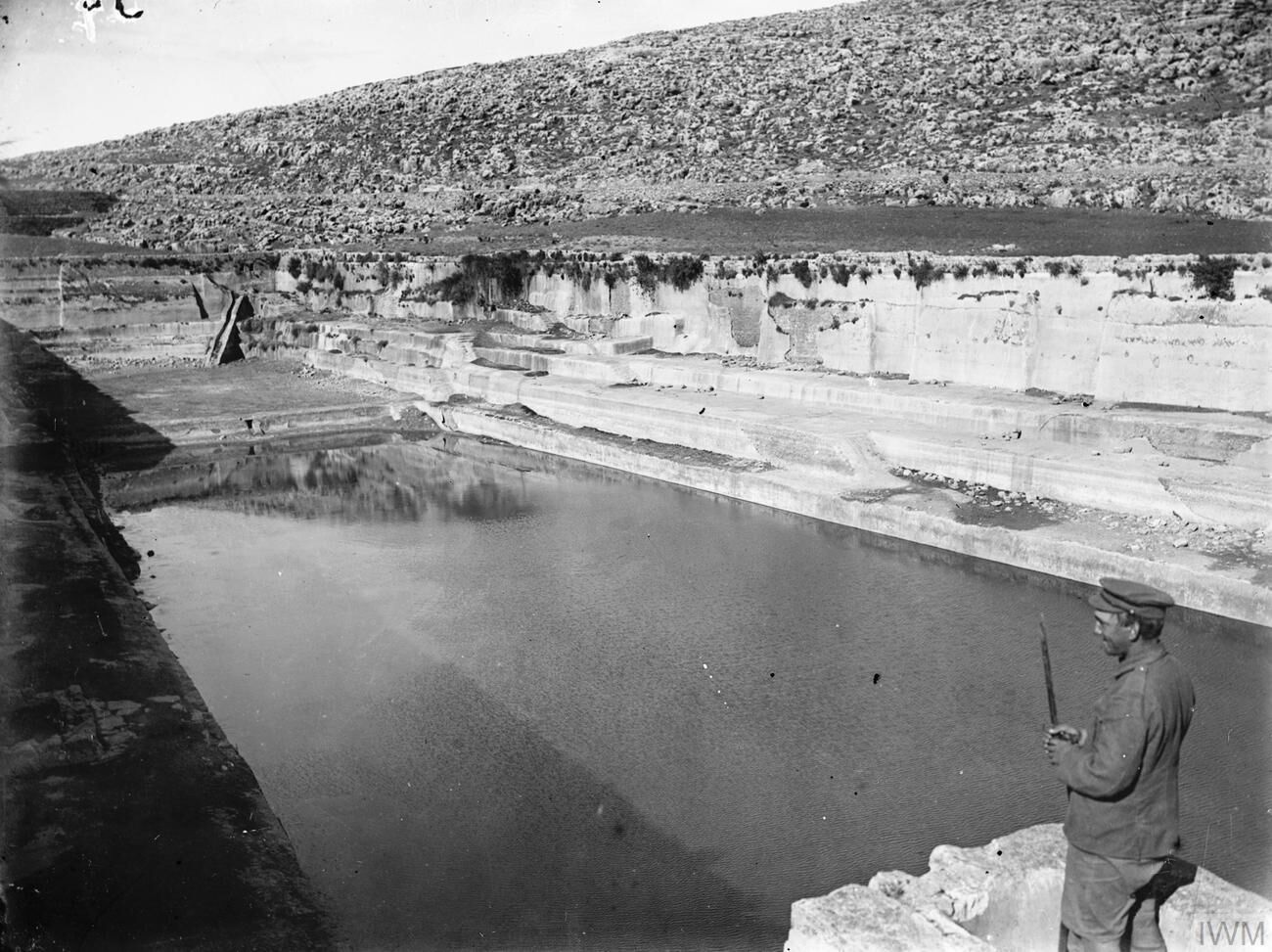
A British sentry at one of the three Solomon's Pools, a few miles south of Bethlehem (Burak, 53rd Division)

=== Relief of the Anzac Mounted Division ===
On 16 May two brigades of the Anzac Mounted Division were relieved of their duties in the Jordan Valley and ordered two weeks rest in the hills near Bethlehem. The division trekked up the winding white road, which ran between Jericho and Jerusalem, stopping at Talaat Ed Dum, a dry, dusty bivouac near the Good Samaritan's Inn where, Lieutenant General Chauvel, commander of the Jordan Valley sector, had his headquarters beside the Jericho road about 2 kilometres (1.2 mi) to the east. The brigades of the Anzac Mounted Division remained there until 29 May the following morning moved through Bethany, skirted the walls of the Holy City, and through modern Jerusalem and out along the Hebron road to a bivouac site in the cool mountain air at Solomon's Pools about halfway between Jerusalem and Hebron. Only the 1st Light Horse Brigade and the New Zealand Mounted Rifles Brigade left the Jordan Valley at this time; the 2nd Light Horse Brigade remained; they left the valley for Solomon's Pools on 5 June and returned on 22 June.

=== Jerusalem tourists ===
Even when nominally 'resting' a trooper's time was never his own. Horse-pickets still had to do their turn every night, guards, pumping parties for watering the horses and endless other working parties had to be supplied. The horses were watered twice a day at the "Pools of Solomon", great oblong cisterns of stone, some hundreds of feet long, which were still in good condition. The pumps were worked by the pumping parties on a ledge in one of the cisterns pushing the water up into the canvas troughs above, where the horses were brought in groups. The hand-pumps and canvas troughs were carried everywhere, and where water was available were quickly erected.

During their stay at Solomon's Pools the men attended a celebration of the King's Birthday on 3 June, when a parade was held in Bethlehem and the inhabitants of Bethlehem were invited to attend. They erected a triumphal arch decorated with flowers and flags and inscribed: "Bethlehem Municipality Greeting on the Occasion of the Birthday of His Majesty King George V" at the entrance to the square, in front of the Church of the Nativity.

While at Solomon's Pools, most of the men got the opportunity of seeing Jerusalem where many photographs of historical spots were taken and sent home. Some gained the impression that the light horsemen and mounted riflemen were having some sort of a "Cook's tour". Naturally most of the photos were taken during these short rest periods as the long months of unending work and discomfort gave rare opportunities or inclinations for taking photos.

=== Return of the Anzac Mounted Division ===
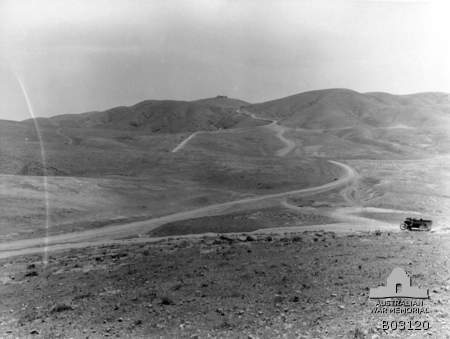
Talaat ed Dumm. Model T Ford car on side road

On 13 June the two brigades moved out to return via Talaat ed Dumm to Jericho, reaching their bivouac area in the vicinity of the Ain es Duk on 16 June. Here a spring gushes out a mass of stones in an arid valley and within a few yards became a full flowing stream of cool and clear water, giving a flow of some 200,000 imperial gallons (910,000 L) per day. Part of this stream ran across a small valley along a beautiful, perfectly preserved, Roman arched aqueduct of three tiers.

For the rest of June, while the Australian Mounted Division was at Solomon's Pools, the Anzac Mounted Division held the left sector of the defences, digging trenches and regularly patrolling the area including occasional encounters with enemy patrols.

=== Relief of the Australian Mounted Division ===
The relief of the Australian Mounted Division by the Anzac Mounted Division was ordered on 14 June and by 20 June the command of the left sector of the Jordan Valley passed to the commander of the Anzac Mounted Division from the commander of the Australian Mounted Division who took over command of all troops at Solomon's Pools. Over several days the 3rd Light Horse, 4th Light Horse and 5th Mounted Brigades were relieved of their duties and sent to Bethlehem for a well earned rest.

The 4th Light Horse Field Ambulance moved out at 17:00 on Sunday 9 June in a terrific storm and three hours later arrived at Talaat ed Dumm halfway to Jerusalem where they spent a couple of days; it was exactly six weeks since the brigade had first gone to the Jordan Valley.

On Thursday 13 June the Field Ambulance packed up and moved onto the Jerusalem road at about 18:00 travelling on the very steep up-hill road till 23:00; on the way picking up four patients. They rested till 01.30 on Friday, before going on to arrive at Jerusalem, about 06:00, then on to Bethlehem, and two miles beyond, reached Solomon's Pools by 09:00. Here the three huge rock-lined reservoirs, built by King Solomon about 970 BC to supply water by aqueducts to Jerusalem, were still in reasonable repair as were the aqueducts which were still supplying about 40,000 gallons of water a day to Jerusalem.

Here in the uplands near Solomon's Pools, the sunny days were cool, and at night men who had suffered sleepless nights on the Jordan enjoyed the mountain mists and the comfort of blankets. The Australian Mounted Division Train accompanied the division Bethlehem to repair the effects of the Jordan Valley on men, animals and wagons.

=== Return of the Australian Mounted Division ===
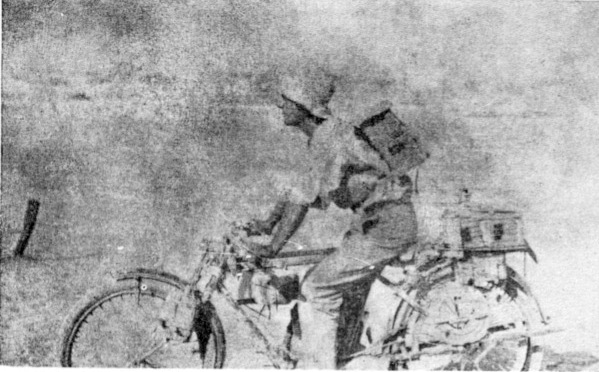
Light Horse Despatch Rider with carrier pigeons, Jordan Valley 1918

Desert Mounted Corps informed the Australian Mounted Division at 10:00 on Friday 28 June that an attempt was to be made by the enemy to force a crossing over the Jordan in the area south of the Ghoraniyeh bridgehead. The division packed up quickly and began its return journey the same day at 17:30; the 4th Light Horse Field Ambulance arriving at Talaat ed Dumm or the Samaritan's Inn at 15:00 on Saturday 29 June 1918. And at dusk on Sunday 30 June the division moved out and travelled till midnight then bivouacked back in the Jordan Valley, just three weeks after leaving.

On Monday 1 July 4 Light Horse Brigade "stood to" all day near Jericho until 20:00, when in the dark, they moved northwards about 10 miles (16 km) to a position in a gully between two hills, just behind the front line. The horses were picqueted and the men turned in about 23:00. Next morning the whole camp was pitched, the field ambulance erecting their hospital and operating tents, and horse lines were put down and everything was straightened up. The weather was still very hot but the daily early morning parade continued, followed by all the horses being taken to water. It was necessary to go about 5 miles (8.0 km), to water and back, through terrible dust, which naturally the horses churned up so that it was difficult to see the horse in front. The men wore goggles and handkerchiefs over their mouths to keep out some of the dust, but it was a long, dusty, hot trip.

Each day during the middle of summer in July, the dust grew deeper and finer, the heat more intense and the stagnant air heavier and sickness and sheer exhaustion became more pronounced, and it was noticed that the older men were better able to resist the distressing conditions. Shell-fire and snipers caused casualties which were, if not heavy, a steady drain on the Australian and New Zealand forces, and when men were invalided, the shortage of reinforcements necessitated bringing them back to the valley before their recovery was complete. (Note: Infantry and cavalry serving in other units at this time in the Jordan Valley, would have suffered similarly.)

Daily mounted patrols were undertaken during which skirmishes and minor actions often occurred, while the bridgeheads remained contested ground. A small fleet of armed launches patrolled the eastern shore of the Dead Sea, also providing a link with the Prince Feisal's Sherifial force. Many men were wounded while on patrol during tours of duty.

During the height of summer in the heat, the still atmosphere, and the dense clouds of dust, there was constant work associated with the occupation; getting supplies, maintaining sanitation as well as front line duties which was usually active. The occupation force was persistently shelled in advanced positions on both sides of the river, as well as at headquarters in the rear.

From mid July, after the action of Abu Tellul, both sides confined themselves to artillery activity, and to patrol work, in which the Indian Cavalry, excelled.

=== Relief and return of the Anzac Mounted Division ===
The Anzac Mounted Division was in the process of returning to the Jordan Valley during 16–25 August after its second rest camp at Solomon's Pools which began at the end of July – beginning of August.

=== Australian Mounted Division move out of the valley ===
On 9 August the division was ordered to leave the Jordan Valley exactly six weeks after returning from Solomon's Pools in July and 12 weeks since they first entered the valley. They moved across Palestine in three easy stages of about 15 miles (24 km) each, via Talaat ed Dumm, Jerusalem and Enab to Ludd, about 12 miles (19 km) from Jaffa on the Mediterranean coast; each stage beginning about 20:00 in the evening and completed before dawn to avoid being seen by enemy reconnaissance aircraft. They arrived at Ludd about midnight on 14/15 August; pitched their tents in an olive orchard and put down horse lines. The following day camps were established; paths were made and gear in transport wagons unloaded and stored.

== Final days of occupation ==
From the departure of the Australian Mounted Division steps were taken to make it appear that the valley was still fully garrisoned. These included building a bridge in the valley and infantry were marched into the Jordan Valley by day, driven out by motor lorry at night, and marched back in daylight over and over again and 15,000 dummy horses were made of canvas and stuffed with straw and every day mules dragged branches up and down the valley (or the same horses were ridden backwards and forwards all day, as if watering) to keep the dust in thick clouds. Tents were left standing and 142 fires were lit each night.

On 11 September, the 10th Cavalry Brigade including the Scinde Horse, left the Jordan Valley. They marched via Jericho, 19 miles (31 km) to Talaat de Dumm, then a further 20 miles (32 km) to Enab and the following day reached Ramleh on 17 September.

Although the maintenance of so large a mounted force in the Jordan Valley had been expensive as regards the level of fitness and numbers of sick soldiers of the garrison, it was less costly than having to re-take the valley prior to the Battle of Megiddo and the force which continued to garrison the valley played an important part in that battle's strategy.

While considerable numbers of the occupation force suffered from malaria and the heat and dust were terrible, the occupation paved the way for Allenby's successful Battle of Megiddo in September 1918.

== Notes ==
Footnotes

Citations
