= Unchukatl =

Rural locality in Russia

Unchukatl Унчукатль Гьунчӏукьатӏи
- Selo
- Location within Republic of Dagestan Location within Russia
- Coordinates: 42°13′N 47°09′E
- Country: Russia
- Region: Republic of Dagestan
- District: Laksky District
- Time zone: UTC+3:00

Unchukatl (Russian: Унчукатль; Lak: Гьунчӏукьатӏи) is a rural locality (or selo), and the administrative centre of Unchukatlinsky Selsoviet, Laksky District, Republic of Dagestan, Russia.

In 2010, the population was 451. There are 10 streets.

== Geography ==
Unchukatl is located 9 km (5.6 mi) northeast of the district's administrative centre Kumukh. The nearest rural locality is Karasha.

== Notable residents ==
- Zagidi Mamayev (Member of the Russian Engineering Academy and Laureate of the USSR Council of Ministers Prize)
