= Karasha =

Rural locality in Russia

Karasha Караша Караши
- Selo
- Location within Republic of Dagestan Location within Russia
- Coordinates: 42°13′N 47°10′E
- Country: Russia
- Region: Republic of Dagestan
- District: Laksky District
- Time zone: UTC+3:00

Karasha (Russian: Караша; Lak: Караши) is a rural locality (or selo) and the administrative centre of Karashinsky Selsoviet, Laksky District, Republic of Dagestan, Russia.

In 2010, the population was 167. There are 3 streets.

== Geography ==
Karasha is located 12 km (7.5 mi) northeast of the district's administrative center Kumukh by road. Unchukatl and Kamasha are the nearest rural localities.
