= Kulushats =

Kulushats Кулушац Кулушаци
- Selo
- Location within Republic of Dagestan Location within Russia
- Coordinates: 42°07′N 47°05′E
- Country: Russia
- Region: Republic of Dagestan
- District: Laksky District
- Time zone: UTC+3:00

Kulushats (Russian: Кулушац; Lak: Кулушаци) is a rural locality (a selo) and the administrative centre of Kulushatsky Selsoviet, Laksky District, Republic of Dagestan, Russia. The population was 63 as of 2010. There are 3 streets.

== Geography ==
Kulushats is located 8 km southwest of Kumukh (the district's administrative centre) by road. Chitur and Shovkra are the nearest rural localities.

== Nationalities ==
Laks live there.

== Famous residents ==
- Rizvan Suleymanov (Hero of the Soviet Union)
- Nuratdin Yusupov (poet)
