= Ash-Shunah al-Janubiyah =

Ash-Shunah al-Janubiyah الشونة الجنوبية
- Town
- Location within Jordan
- Coordinates: 31.9148°N 35.6133°E
- PAL: 146/208
- Country: Jordan

Population (2015)
  - Total: 2,887

Ash-Shunah al-Janubiyah (Arabic: الشونة الجنوبية), also Shoonah Janoobiyah, South Shuna or Southern Shouneh, etc., is a populated place in Balqa Governorate, Jordan, in the eastern Jordan Valley, not far from the place where the Jordan flows into the Dead Sea. The town stretches along the Jordan Valley Highway (HW 65) north of the intersection with Route 437 (King Hussein Bridge Road), east of the Allenby (or King Hussein) Bridge and border crossing. It is the seat of the Ash-Shunah al-Janubiyah District.

South Shuna is the location of the cultural heritage site known as Shunet Nimrin / Shunat Nimrin. The Tell Nimrin archaeological site is within South Shuna.

There is a Monument to the Unknown Soldier to commemorate the victory at the Battle of Karameh.

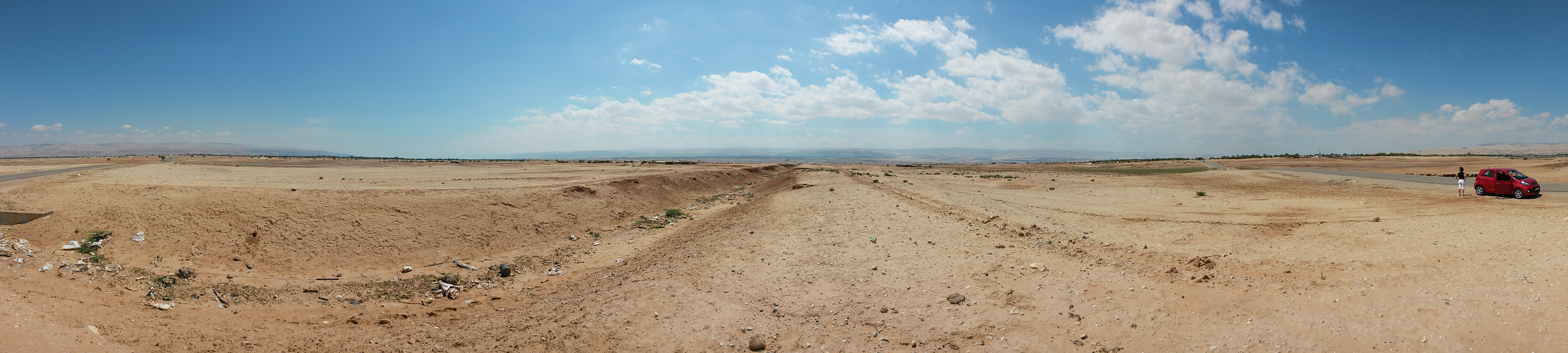
Landscape from Ash-Shunah al-Janubiyah District

== Etymology ==
Shunah means "barn", janub is Arabic for "south", and al-janubiyah means "southern". Therefore, Ash-Shunah al-Janubiyah is often rendered in English as "South Shuna", or "Southern Shuna" with another Shunah town at the opposite, northern end of the Jordan Valley being known as North Shuna.

Shunah is also spelled Shuneh and Shuna. The article al undergoes assimilation to the following consonant in specific cases, when al is sounded ash, also spelled esh, al-Shunah becoming ash-Shunah/esh-Shuneh. For convenience, the definite article at the beginning of place-names may be dropped, yielding here simply Shunah al-Janubiyah.

South Shuna is also historically known as Shunat Nimrin. Nimrin is the name of nearby Tell Nimrin and the lower section of a wadi called Wadi Nimrin downstream from Tell Nimrin and Wadi Shu'eib upstream from the tell.

== See also ==
- Shuna (disambiguation)
  - Al-Shunah al-Shamalyah / North Shuna, town at the opposite end of Jordan's Jordan Valley
- British occupation of the Jordan Valley. Shunah was repeatedly fought over.
- Ghoraniyeh, Jordan River ford south of Wadi Nimrin
