= Tulizma =

Tulizma Тулизма Тӏулизун
- Selo
- Location within Republic of Dagestan Location within Russia
- Coordinates: 42°06′N 47°07′E
- Country: Russia
- Region: Republic of Dagestan
- District: Laksky District
- Time zone: UTC+3:00

Tulizma (Russian: Тулизма; Lak: Тӏулизун) is a rural locality (a selo) in Shovkrinsky Selsoviet, Laksky District, Republic of Dagestan, Russia. The population was 67 as of 2010.

== Geography ==
Tulizma is located 6 km south of Kumukh (the district's administrative centre) by road, on the left bank of the Kazikumukhskoye Koysu River. Khurkhi and Shara are the nearest rural localities.

== Nationalities ==
Laks live there.
