= Shakhuva =

Shakhuva Шахува Шахьуйми
- Selo
- Location within Republic of Dagestan Location within Russia
- Coordinates: 42°15′N 47°09′E
- Country: Russia
- Region: Republic of Dagestan
- District: Laksky District
- Time zone: UTC+3:00

Shakhuva (Russian: Шахува; Lak: Шахьуйми) is a rural locality (a selo) in Kundynsky Selsoviet, Laksky District, Republic of Dagestan, Russia. The population was 44 as of 2010. There are 7 streets.

== Geography ==
Shakhuva is located 12 km northeast of Kumukh (the district's administrative centre) by road, on the right bank of the Kazikumukshkoye Koysu. Kundy and Kuma are the nearest rural localities.

== Nationalities ==
Laks live there.

== Famous residents ==
Mariyan Dandamayeva (performer of Lak folk songs, People's Artist of the Dagestan ASSR)
