= Kuma, Republic of Dagestan =

Kuma Кума Куми
- Selo
- Location within Republic of Dagestan Location within Russia
- Coordinates: 42°16′N 47°08′E
- Country: Russia
- Region: Republic of Dagestan
- District: Laksky District
- Time zone: UTC+3:00

Kuma (Russian: Кума; Lak: Куми) is a rural locality (a selo) and the administrative centre of Kuminsky Selsoviet, Laksky District, Republic of Dagestan, Russia. The population was 478 as of 2010. There is 1 street.

== Geography ==
Kuma is located 22 km south of Kumukh (the district's administrative centre) by road, on the left bank of the Kazikumukhskoye Koysu River. Tsovkra-2 and Tsushchar are the nearest rural localities.

== Nationalities ==
Laks live there.

== Famous residents ==
- Adam Khachilayev (USSR champion in karate)
- Magomed Khachilayev (USSR champion in karate)
- Nadyr Khachiliev (State Duma deputy)
- Gulizar Sultanova (honored art worker of Russia, art critic)
