= Khurukra =

Khurukra Хурукра Хьурукӏул
- Selo
- Location within Republic of Dagestan Location within Russia
- Coordinates: 42°09′N 47°07′E
- Country: Russia
- Region: Republic of Dagestan
- District: Laksky District
- Time zone: UTC+3:00

Khurukra (Russian: Хурукра; Lak: Хьурукӏул) is a rural locality (a selo) in Khurinsky Selsoviet, Laksky District, Republic of Dagestan, Russia. The population was 193 as of 2010. There are 2 streets.

== Geography ==
Khurukra is located 3 km southeast of Kumukh (the district's administrative centre) by road, on the left bank of the Kazikumukhskoye Koysu River. Khuri and Kumukh are the nearest rural localities.

== Nationalities ==
Laks live there.

== Famous residents ==
- Mueddin Charinov (poet)
- Abdul Akhmedov (People's Architect of the USSR, laureate of the USSR State Prize)
- Yusup Khapalayev (poet)
- Abdurakhman Omarshayev (poet)
- Adam Adamov (poet)
