= Kundy =

Kundy Кунды Кӏундими
- Selo
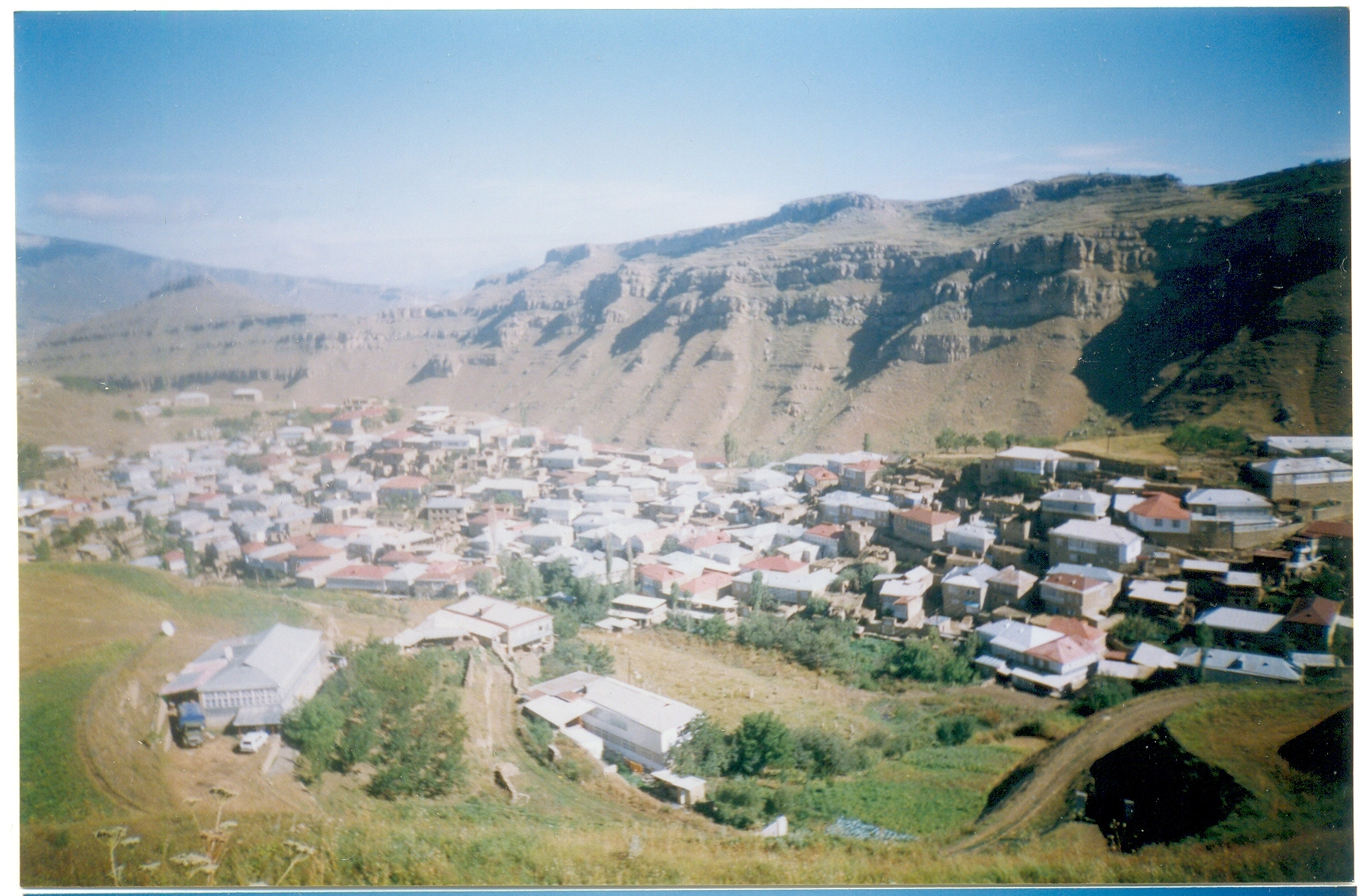
- The village of Kundy

- Location within Republic of Dagestan Location within Russia
- Coordinates: 42°16′N 47°09′E
- Country: Russia
- Region: Republic of Dagestan
- District: Laksky District
- Time zone: UTC+3:00

Kundy (Russian: Кунды; Lak: Кӏундими) is a rural locality (a selo) and the administrative centre of Kundynsky Selsoviet, Laksky District, Republic of Dagestan, Russia. The population was 815 as of 2010. There are 5 streets.

== Geography ==
Kundy is located 19 km northeast of Kumukh (the district's administrative centre) by road. Kuma and Kara are the nearest rural localities.

== Nationalities ==
Laks live there.
