= Kubra, Republic of Dagestan =

Kubra Кубра Кӏувур
- Selo
- Location within Republic of Dagestan Location within Russia
- Coordinates: 42°08′N 47°04′E
- Country: Russia
- Region: Republic of Dagestan
- District: Laksky District
- Time zone: UTC+3:00

Kubra (Russian: Кубра; Lak: Кӏувур) is a rural locality (a selo) and the administrative centre of Kubrinsky Selsoviet, Laksky District, Republic of Dagestan, Russia. The population was 197 as of 2010. There is 1 street.

== Geography ==
Kubra is located 6 km southwest of Kumukh (the district's administrative centre) by road. Gushchi and Chitur are the nearest rural localities.

== Nationalities ==
Laks live there.
