= Shuna =

Shuna may refer to:

== People ==
- Shuna Scott Sendall (born 1975), Scottish opera singer
- Shuna Harwood (born 1940), British costume designer
- Shuna Matsumoto (born 1985), Japanese association football coach
- Jiāng Shúnà or Chiang Shu-na (born 1964), Taiwanese singer, television presenter, and actress

== Places ==
=== Arabic placenames ===
Shuna/Shuneh means granary or silo in Arabic.

- Palestine and Israel
  - Al-Shuna, Mandate-period Safad Sub-district
  - Khirbat al-Shuna, Mandate-period Safad Sub-district
  - Minor sites
    - Dahrat esh-Shuna, village near Kafr Ra'i, Jenin Sub-district, West Bank
    - Esh-Shuna area overlooking the village of Tell, Nablus
    - Khan esh-Shuna, Acre, Israel, caravanserai near Khan el-Umdan
    - Khirbet Kafr Shuna, khirba within Nabi Ilyas, Qalqilya Governorate
    - Shuna el-Qaraqra, large courtyard compound in Arrabat al-Battuf, Lower Galilee
    - Shuna Tamra, Nazareth Subdistrict, Mandatory Palestine, with a ruined tower
    - Tell esh-Shuna / Tell Qudadi, ancient site in Tel Aviv
- Jordan
  - North Shuna, Jordan Valley
  - South Shuna, Jordan Valley
- Syria
  - Khan al-Shuneh (Suq al-Shuna), historical warehouse in Aleppo, Syria
- Egypt
  - Shunet El Zebib / Shuneh / Middle Fort, large ancient mudbrick structure at Abydos, Upper Egypt

=== Scotland ===
- Shuna, Slate Islands, an island offshore from Arduaine, east of Luing in the Firth of Lorn and at the northern end of the Sound of Jura
- Shuna Island, offshore from Appin, north-east of the island of Lismore in the Lynn of Lorn (the southern branch of Loch Linnhe),

== Fiction ==
- The Journey of Shuna, a manga by Hayao Miyazaki
- Shuna, an ogre princess in That Time I Got Reincarnated as a Slime
- Shuna Sakakibara, a character from NG Life manga
- Shuna in list of Elfquest characters

== Vessels ==
- SS Shuna, a Glasgow steamer, see Sound of Mull
- Sound of Shuna, a vessel of Western Ferries

== See also ==
- Hugh Morton, Baron Morton of Shuna
