= Shuni, Republic of Dagestan =

Shuni Шуни Шуними
- Selo
- Location within Republic of Dagestan Location within Russia
- Coordinates: 42°11′N 47°10′E
- Country: Russia
- Region: Republic of Dagestan
- District: Laksky District
- Time zone: UTC+3:00

Shuni (Russian: Шуни; Lak: Шуними) is a rural locality (a selo) in Khuninsky Selsoviet, Laksky District, Republic of Dagestan, Russia. The population was 79 as of 2010.

== Geography ==
Shuni is located 10 km northeast of Kumukh (the district's administrative centre) by road. Turtsi and Kurla are the nearest rural localities.

== Nationalities ==
Laks live there.

== Famous residents ==
- Abutalib Gafurov (poet)
