= Shara, Republic of Dagestan =

Shara Шара
- Selo
- Location within Republic of Dagestan Location within Russia
- Coordinates: 42°06′N 47°08′E
- Country: Russia
- Region: Republic of Dagestan
- District: Laksky District
- Time zone: UTC+3:00

Shara (Russian: Шара) is a rural locality (a selo) in Laksky District, Republic of Dagestan, Russia. The population was 715 as of 2010. There are 7 streets.

== Geography ==
Shara is located 8 km south of Kumukh (the district's administrative centre) by road, on the Kunnul River. Khurkhi and Tulizma are the nearest rural localities.

== Nationalities ==
Laks live there.
