= Laksky District =

Laksky District Лакский район (Russian)
- District

Other transcription(s)
  - Lak: Лакрал кӏану
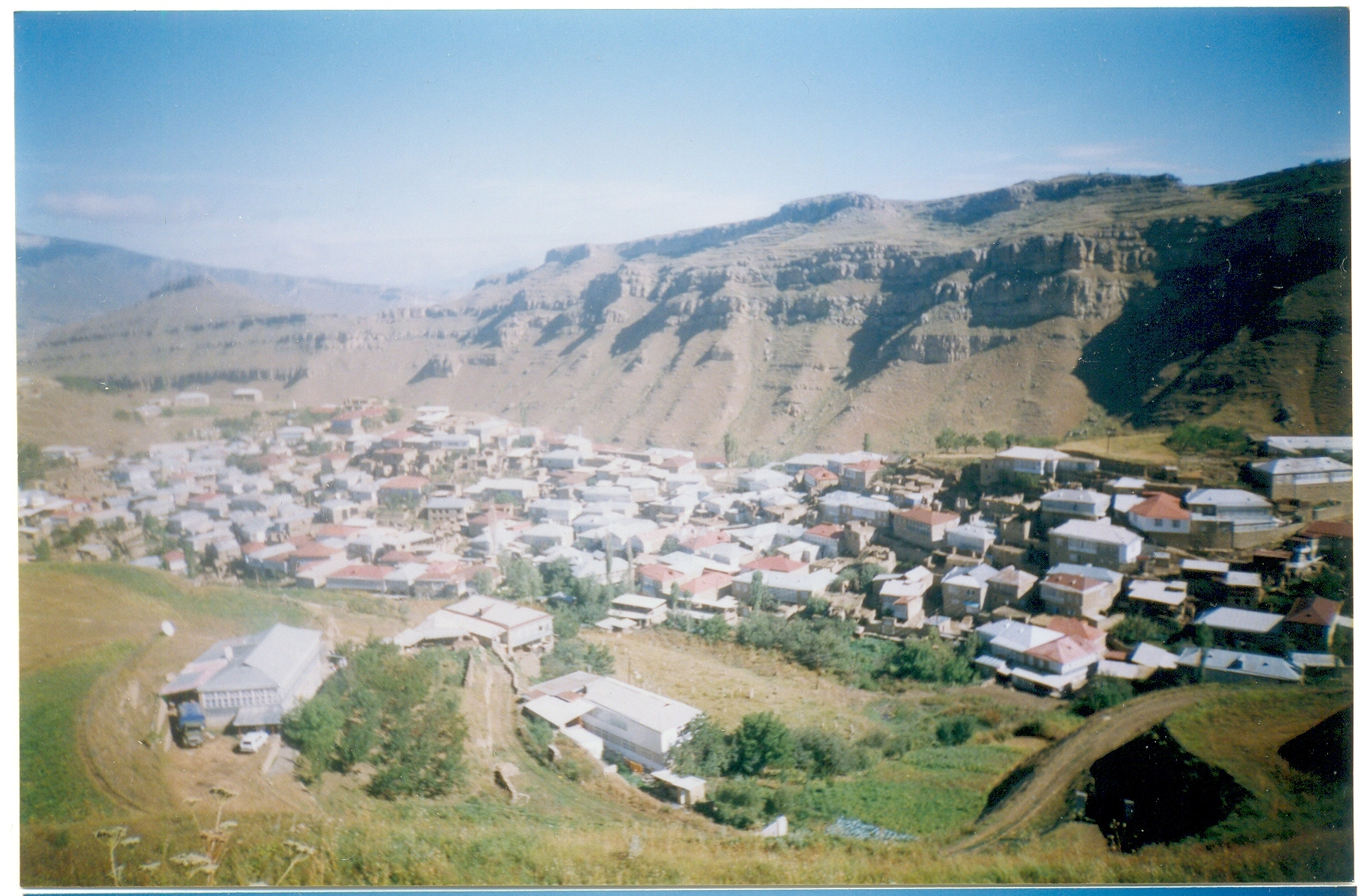
- The selo of Kundy in Laksky District

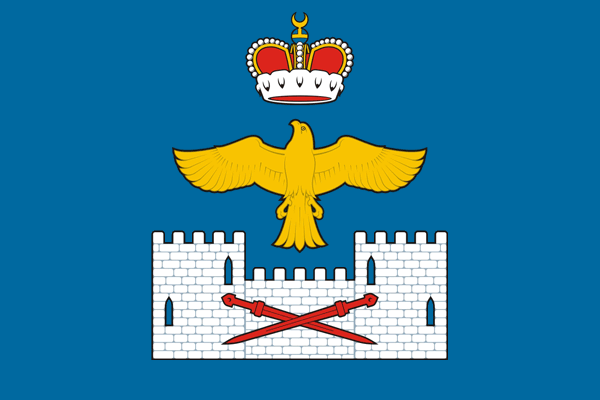
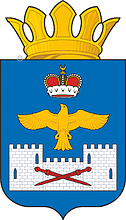
- Flag Coat of arms
- Location of Laksky District in the Republic of Dagestan
- Coordinates: 42°10′N 47°07′E
- Country: Russia
- Federal subject: Republic of Dagestan
- Established: 29 March 1935
- Administrative center: Kumukh

Area
  - Total: 750 km^{2} (290 sq mi)

Population (2010 Census)
  - Total: 12,161
  - Density: 16/km^{2} (42/sq mi)
  - Urban: 0%
  - Rural: 100%

Administrative structure
  - Administrative divisions: 16 Selsoviets
  - Inhabited localities: 50 rural localities

Municipal structure
  - Municipally incorporated as: Laksky Municipal District
  - Municipal divisions: 0 urban settlements, 19 rural settlements
- Time zone: UTC+3 (MSK)
- OKTMO ID: 82632000
- Website: http://www.gazikumuh.ru

Population of Laksky District
- 2010 Census: 12,161
- 2002 Census: 12,382
- 1989 Census: 8,619
- 1979 Census: 11,301

Laksky District (Russian: Ла́кский райо́н; Lak: Лакрал кӏану) is an administrative and municipal district (raion), one of the forty-one in the Republic of Dagestan, Russia. It is located in the southern central part of the republic. The area of the district is 750 square kilometers (290 sq mi). Its administrative center is the rural locality (a selo) of Kumukh. As of the 2010 Census, the total population of the district was 12,161, with the population of Kumukh accounting for 15.9% of that number.

== Administrative and municipal status ==
Within the framework of administrative divisions, Laksky District is one of the forty-one in the Republic of Dagestan. The district is divided into sixteen selsoviets which comprise fifty rural localities. As a municipal division, the district is incorporated as Laksky Municipal District. Its sixteen selsoviets are incorporated as nineteen rural settlements within the municipal district. The selo of Kumukh serves as the administrative center of both the administrative and municipal district.

== Demographics ==
Laksky and Kulinsky Districts are the territory where the ethnic Laks predominantly live.

== See also ==
- History of the Lak people
