= Poor Poor Paul =

- Directed by: Vitaly Melnikov
- Story by: Vitaliy Melnikov
- Based on: play of Dmitry Merezhkovsky
- Starring: Viktor Sukhorukov; Oleg Yankovsky; Oksana Mysina
- Cinematography: Sergey Astakhov
- Music by: Andrey Petrov
- Production company: Lenfilm
- Release date: June 22, 2003
- Running time: 103 minutes
- Language: Russian

Poor Poor Paul (Russian: Бедный, бедный Павел, romanized: Bednyy bednyy Pavel) is a 2003 Russian historical drama film. It is a biopic of Czar Paul I of Russia and the final film of the historical trilogy of Vitaly Melnikov "The Empire. The Beginning".

== Plot ==
...The cold November 1796. Empress Catherine the Great who undividedly ruled Russia for 34 years has died. The throne goes back to her son Paul I - a nervous and impetuous middle aged man, who is a captive of his own illusions. Deciding to change almost everything what he inherited from his unloved mother, Paul attracts supporters, one of whom is Count Peter Pahlen. He is an intelligent and calculating courtier who thanks to the boundless trust of the emperor gathers immense power in his hands. Pahlen initially supports Paul's reforms but then the situation changes...

The highest nobility in Russia, fueled by the money of England is extremely unhappy with the innovations of Paul I. One after another plots against him are conspired. Distraught by the suspicion directed towards him and fearing for his life, Paul punishes the innocent and the guilty, but this can not save the unfortunate emperor. The main conspiracy against Paul involves his own sons, Alexander and Constantine, and its general command is carried out by Count Pahlen! Paul eventually falls in total despair after he learns of such a comprehensive betrayal, he ceases to resist and the doomed man awaits the conspirators-murderers in his bedroom at the Mikhailovsky Castle ...

== Cast ==
- Viktor Sukhorukov – Emperor Paul I of Russia
- Oleg Yankovskiy – Count Pahlen
- Oksana Mysina – Maria Feodorovna, Paul's wife
- Yuliya Mavrina – Anna Lopukhina
- Aleksey Barabash – Alexander, Paul's oldest son
- Anna Molchanova – Elizabeth Alexeievna, Alexander's wife
- Yevgeni Karpov – Konstantin, Paul's son
- Igor Shibanov – Ivan Kutaisov, Paul's valet
- Vadim Lobanov – Alexander Bezborodko
- Sergey Barkovsky – John Rogerson, personal doctor of Catherine the Great
- Boris Khvoshnyansky – José de Ribas
- Andrey Chumanov – Platon Zubov
- Ivan Parshin – Valerian Zubov
- Sergey Murzin – Nikolay Zubov
- Vera Karpova – Baroness Livsi
- Aleksandr Grigoryants – Vincenzo Brenna
- Dmitriy Sutyrin – Duke Yashvil

== Awards ==
- 2003 - Kinotavr - M. Tariveridiev prize for Best Music (Andrei Petrov).
- 2003 - The Golden Aries Award - Best Male Actor (Viktor Sukhorukov).
- 2003 - Golden Eagle Award - Best Costume Design (Larisa Konnikova), Best Music (Andrei Petrov), Best Supporting Actor (Oleg Yankovsky).
- 2003 - Nika Award - Best Male Actor (Viktor Sukhorukov).
