= Zubov =

Russian noble family

Coat of arms of the Princes Zubov

The House of Zubov (Russian: Зу́бов) was the Russian noble family, that rose to occupy some of the highest offices of state in the 1790s, when Platon Zubov became the last favorite of Empress Catherine the Great (r. 1762–1796). Members of the family were granted the title Prince of the Holy Roman Empire in 1796 by Francis I.

== History ==
The Zubovs were first noticed in the service of Muscovite dukes in the 15th century. Nikolay Vasilievich Zubov (1699–1786) served in the Collegium of Economics, and his son Alexander Zubov (1727–1795) reputedly enriched himself serving as Vice-Governor of Vladimir. Alexander Zubov had one daughter and four sons; in 1793, together with his sons, he received the title of Count. His children were:

- Nikolay Zubov (1763–1805), who became a general when his family was still in power. Known as a strongman, he served in Suvorov's army and married (1794) Suvorov's only daughter Natalia Alexandrovna (1775–1844).
- Dmitry Zubov (1764–1835), major general in the Imperial Russian Army, considered the founder of the Lithuanian branch of the family. He dedicated himself later to agricultural matters. He was married to princess Praskovją Viazemskaja (Прасковья Александровна Вяземская, 1772–1835), with whom he had four daughters and only one son: Jezilaveta, Varvara, Catherine, Nicholas and Anna.
- Platon Zubov (1767–1822), whom his distant relative, Nicholas Saltykov introduced to the ageing Empress in 1789 and who soon became her lover and the most powerful man in Russia. He was the fourth (and last) Russian to bear the title of Prince of the Holy Roman Empire.
- Valerian Zubov (1771–1804), who while serving under Suvorov in Poland, married a Princess Marianna Lubomirska (1773-1810) and lost his leg in a battle. At the time of Catherine's death in 1796 he was leading the Russian army in Persia.
- Olga Zherebtsova (1766–1849), became involved (along with Nikolay and Platon Zubov) in plotting the assassination of Emperor Paul I, carried out in 1801; she left Russia soon afterwards.

The lines of Count Nicholas and of his brother Dmitry continue up to the present. Nicholas's great-grandson Valentin (1884–1969) was a leading authority on the period of the reign of Emperor Paul I and authored several books on the subject. He was director of the Gatchina Palace museum and founded the Art History Institute in Saint Petersburg before emigrating to Paris in 1925. Dmitry's only son, Nicholas, merged with the local Lithuanian nobility and supported the Lithuanian National Revival characterized by cultural and educational activities. So did his descendants, Vladimir Zubov (born 1862) and his son Vladimiras Zubovas (born 1887).

The Zubovs had two family vaults, one at the Donskoy Monastery in Moscow built in 1796–1798, and another at the Maritime Monastery of St. Sergius in Strelna near Saint Petersburg, completed in 1809.
