= Peter Ludwig von der Pahlen =

Russian courtier and general (1745–1826)

Peter Ludwig Graf
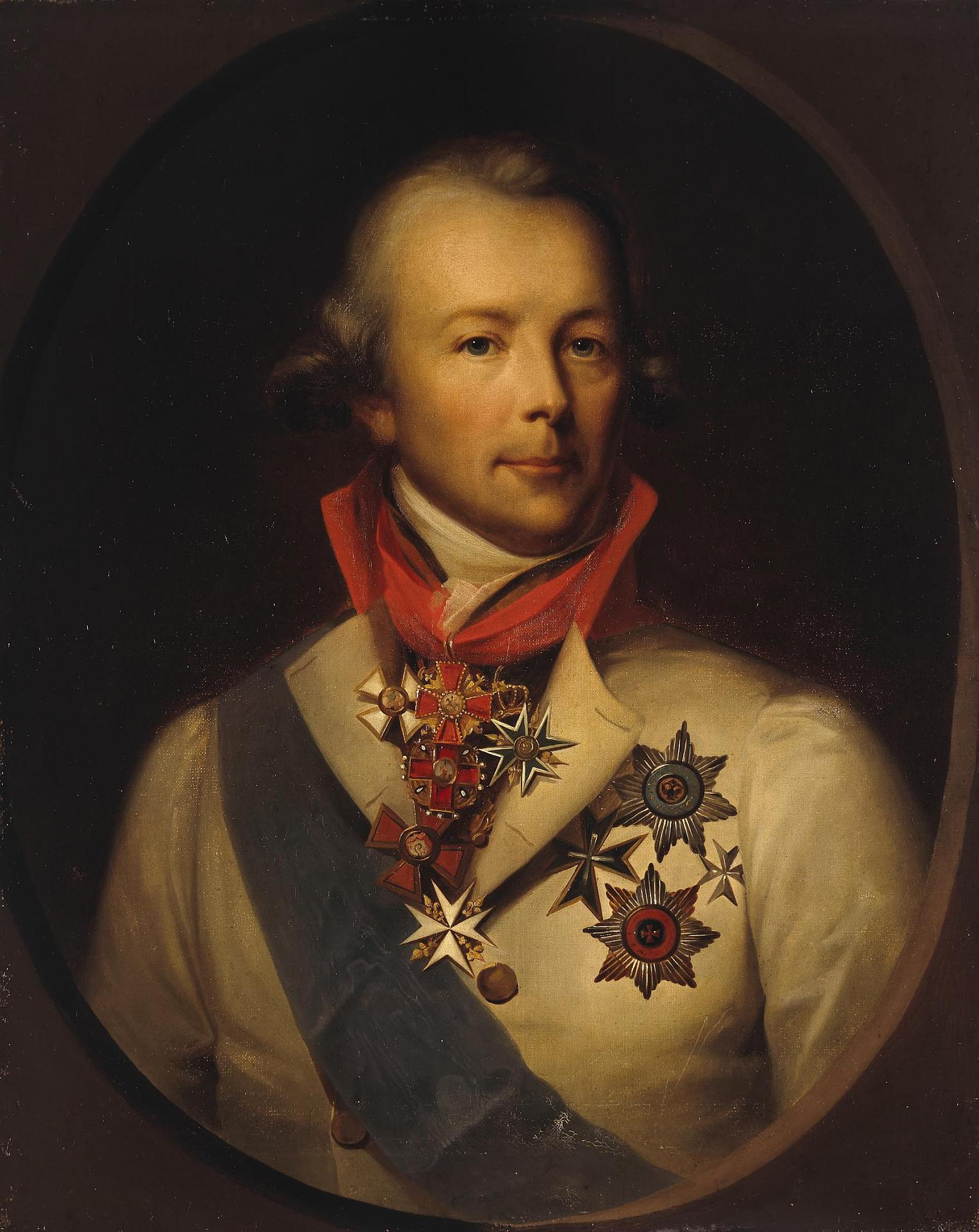
- Portrait by an unknown painter, 1790–1800
- Born: 28 July 1745; Lääne-Viru County, Russian Empire
- Died: 25 February 1826 (aged 80); Mitau, Russian Empire
- Relatives: Peter (son)
- Military career
- Allegiance: Russia
- Branch: Imperial Russian Army
- Service years: 1760–1801
- Rank: General of the cavalry
- Unit: Life Guard Horse Regiment
- Commands: Inspector of the Cavalry; Life Guard Horse Regiment; Cuirassier Regiment of Riga
- Known for: Regicide of Paul I
- Conflicts: Sixth Russo-Turkish War; Seventh Russo-Turkish War
- Awards: Order of Saint George

Military Governor of Saint Petersburg
- In office 1798–1801

Peter Ludwig Graf von der Pahlen (Russian: Пётр Алексе́евич Па́лен, romanized: Pyotr Alekseyevich Palen; 28 July [O.S. 17 July] 1745 – 25 February [O.S. 13 February] 1826) was a Russian courtier and general of Baltic German stock, who played a pivotal role in the assassination of Emperor Paul I of Russia in 1801. He became a general in the Imperial Russian Army in 1798, a count in 1799, and served as the military governor of Saint Petersburg from 1798 to 1801.

== Early career ==
Pahlen stemmed patrilineally from the Baltic German noble family of Pahlen. He was born in the manor of Palmse (Palms), in present-day Lääne-Viru County, Estonia, then part of the Russian Empire. He served in the horse guards and saw service in the Russo-Turkish Wars. He was wounded at Bendery and invested with the Order of St George of the 4th degree. During the Russo-Turkish War of 1787–1792, he distinguished himself during the siege of Ochakov (Order of St. George, 3rd degree).

In 1787, Pahlen was put in charge of Riga Governorate. He conducted the negotiations leading to the incorporation of Courland, Semigallia, and other Biron possessions into the Russian Empire. After that, he was appointed as the first governor general of Courland Governorate (1795).

== Paul's reign ==
On December 3, 1796, Pahlen was appointed to command the Cuirassier Regiment of Riga, but soon the new Emperor made him regret his former contacts with the disgraced prince Platon Zubov. In January 1797 Pahlen was discharged from the governorship, and on 26 February he was relieved from his post in the regiment and excluded from the service.

However, he was soon again accepted into active service and appointed as Inspector of the Cavalry and the commander of the Household Troops of Horse Regiment. He was rapid in acquiring the sovereign's confidence. Enjoying the unlimited favor of Pavel I, for three years (1798–1801) he served as the military governor of Saint Petersburg, the governor of the Baltic provinces, the inspector of 6 military districts, the Grand Chancellor of the Maltese order, the chief director of mail, a member of the Imperial Council and of the Board of Foreign Affairs.

During his time in office the building of St Michael's Castle and of the Naval Military School was completed. Monuments honoring Field Marshal Rumyantsev and Alexander Suvorov were erected at the Field of Mars. The Imperial iron foundry was transferred from Kronstadt to Saint Petersburg and Nikolai Rezanov founded the Russian-American Company.

== Conspiracy and regicide ==
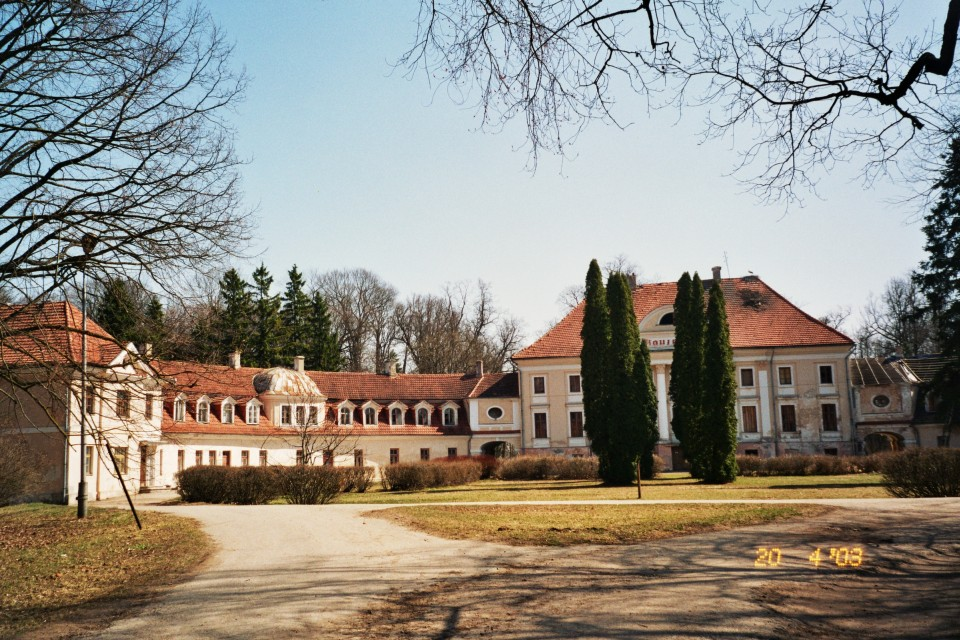
Kauzmünde manor, where Count Pahlen lived in exile.

In August 1800, Pahlen was discharged from his governorship, only to be reappointed on October 21. Seeing how fragile his position was, he joined the conspirators plotting against the emperor in the house of Olga Zherebtsova. Together with Nicholas Zubov he was one of plot's leaders and organizers. In the plot he played a dual role, trying in the case of failure to conceal his participation.

He extracted from the emperor the written order to arrest his son and heir, Alexander Pavlovich, and showed this to him in order to overcome his fluctuation in the plot. He was present during Paul's strangling on the night of 12 March 1801. After the assassination the Empress Maria Feodorovna became his irreconcilable enemy and prevented Pahlen from occupying any important post under Alexander's reign. On 1 April 1801, he was discharged from the service and ordered to withdraw into his estates in Courland. Pahlen died in Mitau (Jelgava) on 13 February 1826.

== Pahlen in film ==
In 1908, Dmitry Merezhkovsky wrote the play Pavel I, which enjoyed limited popularity in Russia. In 2003 the director Vitaly Melnikov adapted the play into the movie Poor Poor Paul. In contrast to the play, the accent in the film is made not only on the fate of Pavel I, but also on Pahlen's role in the plot against him. Pahlen is seen as the tragic figure, which arranged the plot against his own will, worrying not about himself, but about the good of Russia. The role of Pahlen was played by Oleg Yankovsky, that of Paul by Viktor Sukhorukov.

In 1928, Lewis Stone played Pahlen in The Patriot, starring Emil Jannings as Paul I. This film is considered lost, although fragments of it still exist in the UCLA Film Archives. Stone received an Academy Award nomination For Best Actor for his performance.

== Literature ==
- "Пален, Петр-Людвиг" . Brockhaus and Efron Encyclopedic Dictionary (in Russian). 1906.
- Pahlen in Sartre's 'Nausea'
- Pahlen in the writing of John Quincy Adams
- Pahlen in the writings of Thomas Jefferson
