= Olga Zherebtsova =

Russian aristocrat and socialite (1766–1849)

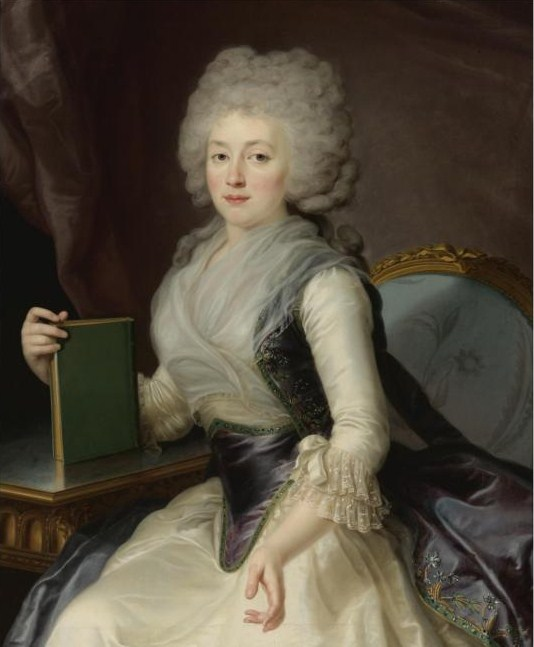
Portrait by Jean-Louis Voille, c. 1785–1799

Olga Alexandrovna Zherebtsova (née Zubova; Russian: Ольга Александровна Жеребцова; 1766–1849), also known as Madame Gerebtzoff, was a Russian aristocrat and socialite, known foremost for her political involvement and love life. She was the sister of the celebrated Zubov brothers, Prince Platon and Counts Nikolay and Valerian.

== Biography ==
After her brothers' fall from grace following Catherine II's death, they conspired with Count Pahlen to assassinate her successor Paul whom they viewed as the author of their misfortunes. The conspirators met and discussed their plans at Zherebtsova's house. Some maintain that she appropriated the funds the British government passed through her lover Charles Whitworth, 1st Earl Whitworth to the conspirators. "Once diplomatic relations with England were broken, Whitworth was ordered to leave the capital with all his staff".

Zherebtsova followed Lord Whitworth to England where she was shocked to learn about his prospective betrothal to the widow of John Sackville, 3rd Duke of Dorset. It was rumored that Madame Gerebtzoff extorted from her rival some 10,000 pounds before turning her attention to the Prince Regent, whose mistress she is said to have become. She is even said to have given birth to a natural son, named George Nord, after his purported royal father.

In the declining years of her life, Madame Gerebtzoff returned to the Russian capital, where she again became immersed in court intrigues through her powerful son-in-law, Prince Aleksey Orlov. In the 1840s, she was the patron of Alexander Herzen, who would recall her character and opinions with admiration in his memoirs "My Past and Thoughts":

Like a tree in winter, she maintained the linear outline of her boughs after the leaves had fallen off and the scraggy bare branches had been pinched with cold, all the more clearly demonstrating her magnificent stature, her daring bulk, and the trunk, though white with frost, still stalking lordly and sulkily and braving every tempest and gust.
