= Persian expedition of 1796 =

Third conflict of the Russo-Persian Wars

Russo-Persian War of 1796
- Part of the Russo-Persian Wars
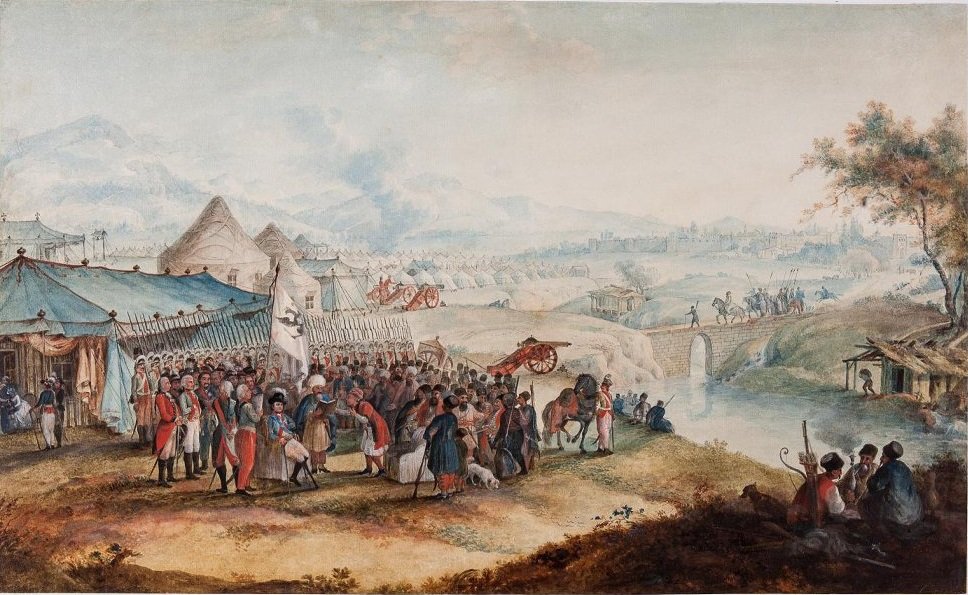
- Oath of allegiance of the Novoshemakhan Gasim khan to Russia among the corps under the command of Count V. A. Zubov off the Aksuchay River in 1796 by Gavriil Sergeev. A late 1790s painting.
Date	April – November 1796
Location	North Caucasus, South Caucasus
Result	Persian victory

Belligerents
Russian Empire; Kingdom of Kartli-Kakheti; Kingdom of Imereti	Qajar Iran; Ganja Khanate; Erivan Khanate

Commanders and leaders
(Russian Empire) Catherine II (Russian Empire) Valerian Zubov; Heraclius II	Agha Mohammad Khan; Javad Khan

Strength
50,000 (other estimates suggest 30,000–40,000 or 10,000-30,000 plus cavalry)	Tofangchi musketeers Royal regiment of Mohammad Khan; Northern town watch

Casualties and losses
2,150 men	Unknown

The Persian expedition of Catherine the Great of 1796, like the Persian expedition of Peter the Great (1722–1723), was one of the Russo-Persian Wars of the 18th century which did not entail any lasting consequences for either belligerent.

The last decades of the 18th century were marked by continual strife between rival claimants to the Persian throne. Empress Catherine the Great of Russia (r. 1762–1796) took advantage of the disorder to consolidate her control over the weak polities of the Caucasus, which was, for swaths of it, an integral Persian domain. The kingdom of Georgia, a subject of the Persians for many centuries, became a Russian protectorate in 1783, when King Erekle II signed the Treaty of Georgievsk, whereby the Empress promised to defend him in the case of Iranian attack. The shamkhals of Tarki followed this lead and accepted Russian protection three years later.

With the enthronement of Agha Mohammad Khan as Shah of Persia in 1794 the political climate changed. He put an end to the period of dynastic strife and proceeded to re-strengthen the Persian hold on the Caucasus by re-garrisoning the Iranian territories and cities in the area of modern-day Dagestan, Azerbaijan, and Armenia, as well as ravaging and recapturing Georgia and reducing its capital Tbilisi to a pile of ashes in 1795. Belatedly, the Empress Catherine determined to mount a punitive expedition against the Shah. The ultimate goal for the Russian government involved toppling the anti-Russian Shah and replacing him with his half-brother, namely Morteza Qoli Khan, who had defected to Russia, and was therefore pro-Russian.

In the Early spring of 1796, Erekle sent his son Alexander and Davit Batonishvili to Ganja with an army assembled by name to punish Javad Khan, from the south. The army of Ibraim-Khan Karabagheli also went to Ganja. Georgians severely defeated Javad Khan troops, locked him in prison, and besieged the city. Then Erekle himself, Giorgi and Ioane Batonishvili, came to Ganja with new troops and assault vehicles. Intimidated by the revenge of the Georgians, Javad Khan asked for peace and sent the key to the city. Georgians entered Ganja. Erekle did not personally accept the sword tied around his neck and paid fifteen thousand manats as an annual tribute.

It was widely expected that the strong Russian corps would be led by a seasoned general like Alexander Suvorov, the subduer of the 1794 Polish uprising. But the general was unimpressed and declined the offer. Eventually the Empress accepted the proposal by her favorite, Prince Platon Zubov, to give the command to his young brother, Count Valerian Zubov. The Russian troops set out from Kizlyar in April 1796 and stormed the key fortress of Derbent on 10 May. The Russian court poet Derzhavin glorified this event in a famous ode; he would later comment bitterly on Valerian Zubov's inglorious return from the expedition in another remarkable poem.

By mid-June Zubov's troops had overrun—without any resistance—most of the territory of modern-day Azerbaijan, including three principal cities—Baku, Shemakha and Ganja. By November they were stationed at the confluence of the Araks and Kura Rivers, poised to attack mainland Iran.

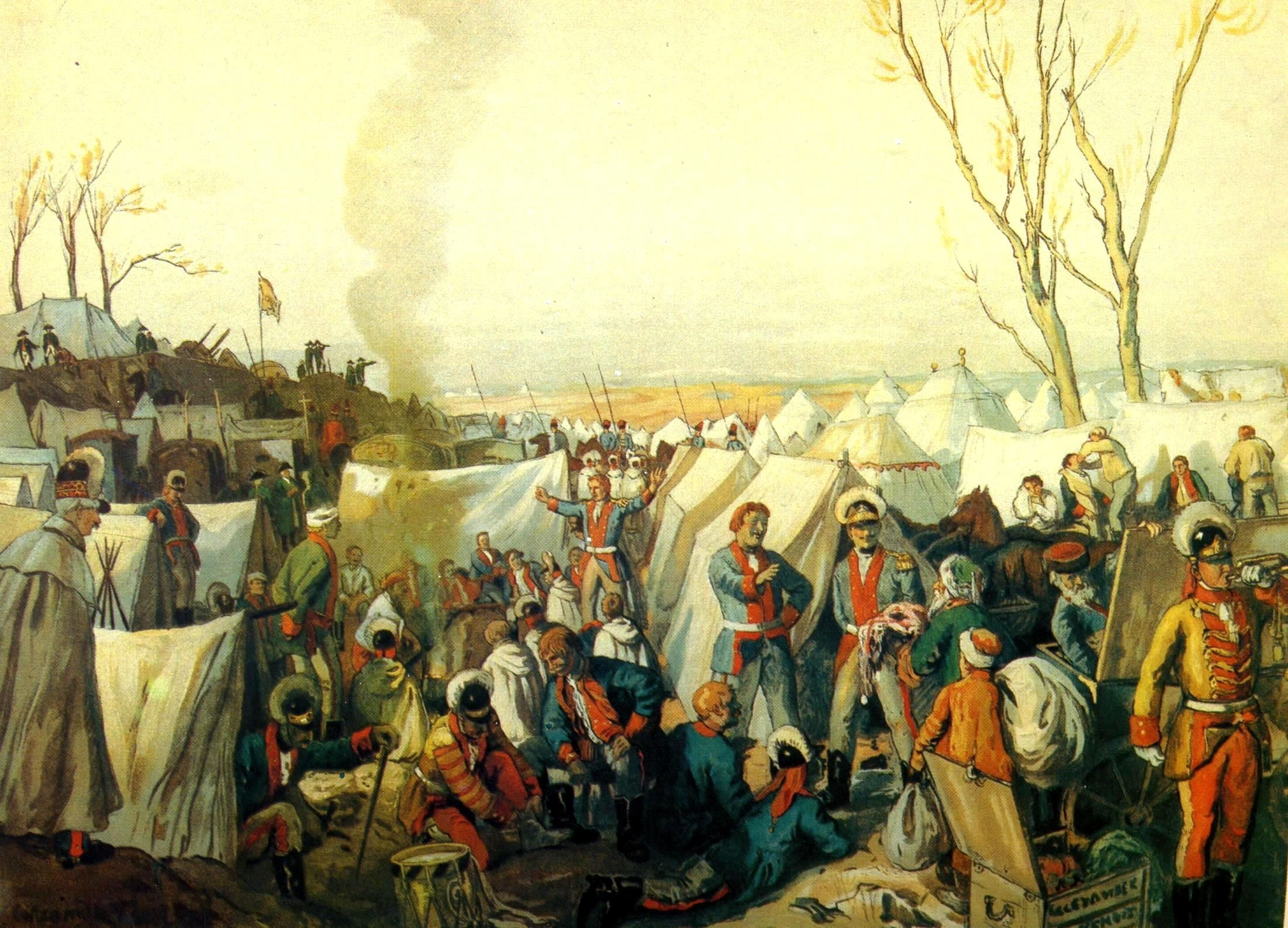
Soldiers of Catherine II by Alexandre Benois

In that month the Empress of Russia died. Her successor, the Emperor Paul, who detested the Zubovs and had other plans for the army, ordered the withdrawal of all Russian troops from the region. This reversal aroused the frustration and enmity of the powerful Zubovs and other officers who took part in the campaign: many of them would join the conspiracy which arranged Paul's assassination five years later.

== See also ==
- Battle of Derbent (1796)
