= Valerian Zubov =

Russian general (1771–1804)

Count Valerian Aleksandrovich Zubov
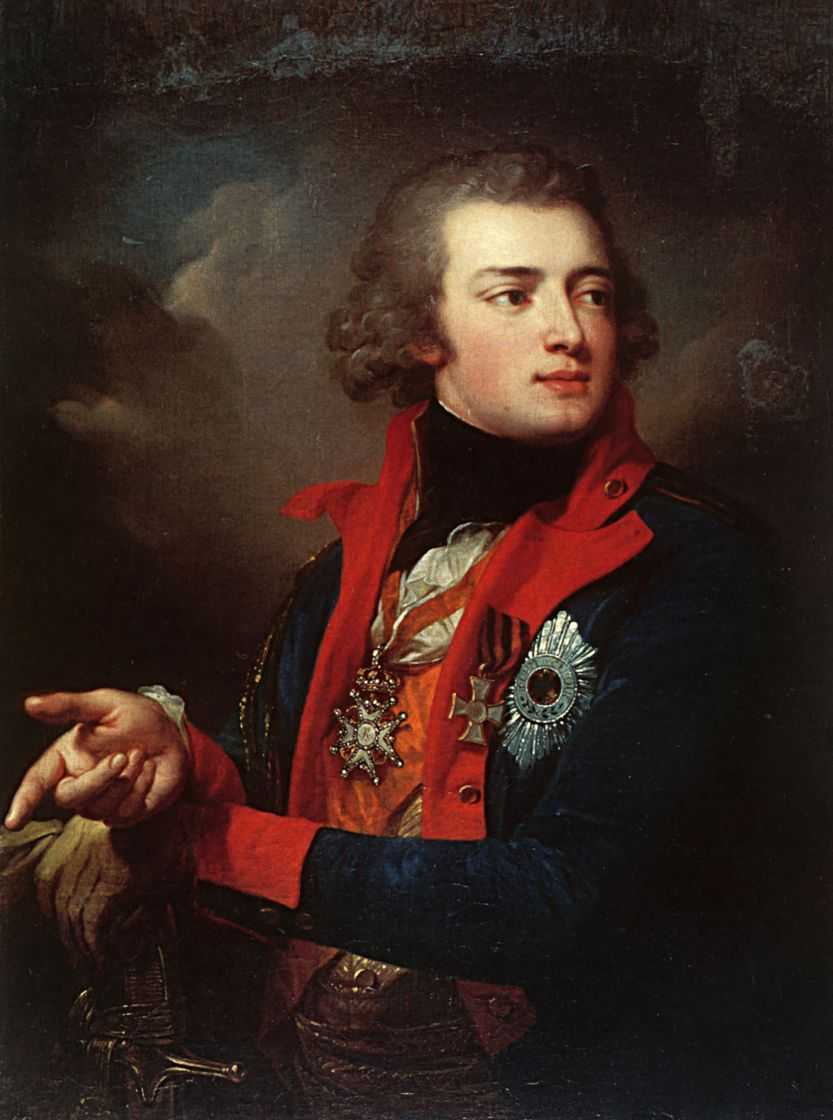
- Zubov in 1796
- Born: 28 November 1771; Saint Petersburg, Russian Empire
- Died: 21 June 1804 (aged 32)
- Burial place: Coastal Monastery of Saint Sergius, Russian Empire
- Relatives: House of Zubov
- Military career
- Allegiance: Russian Empire
- Branch: Imperial Russian Army
- Rank: Major general (c. 1792), General-in-chief (c. 1796), General of the Infantry (c. 1800)
- Conflicts: Persian Expedition of 1796; Capture of Derbent

Count Valerian Aleksandrovich Zubov (Russian: Валериа́н Алекса́ндрович Зу́бов; 1771–1804) was a Russian general who led the Persian Expedition of 1796. His siblings included Platon Zubov and Olga Zherebtsova.

== Biography ==
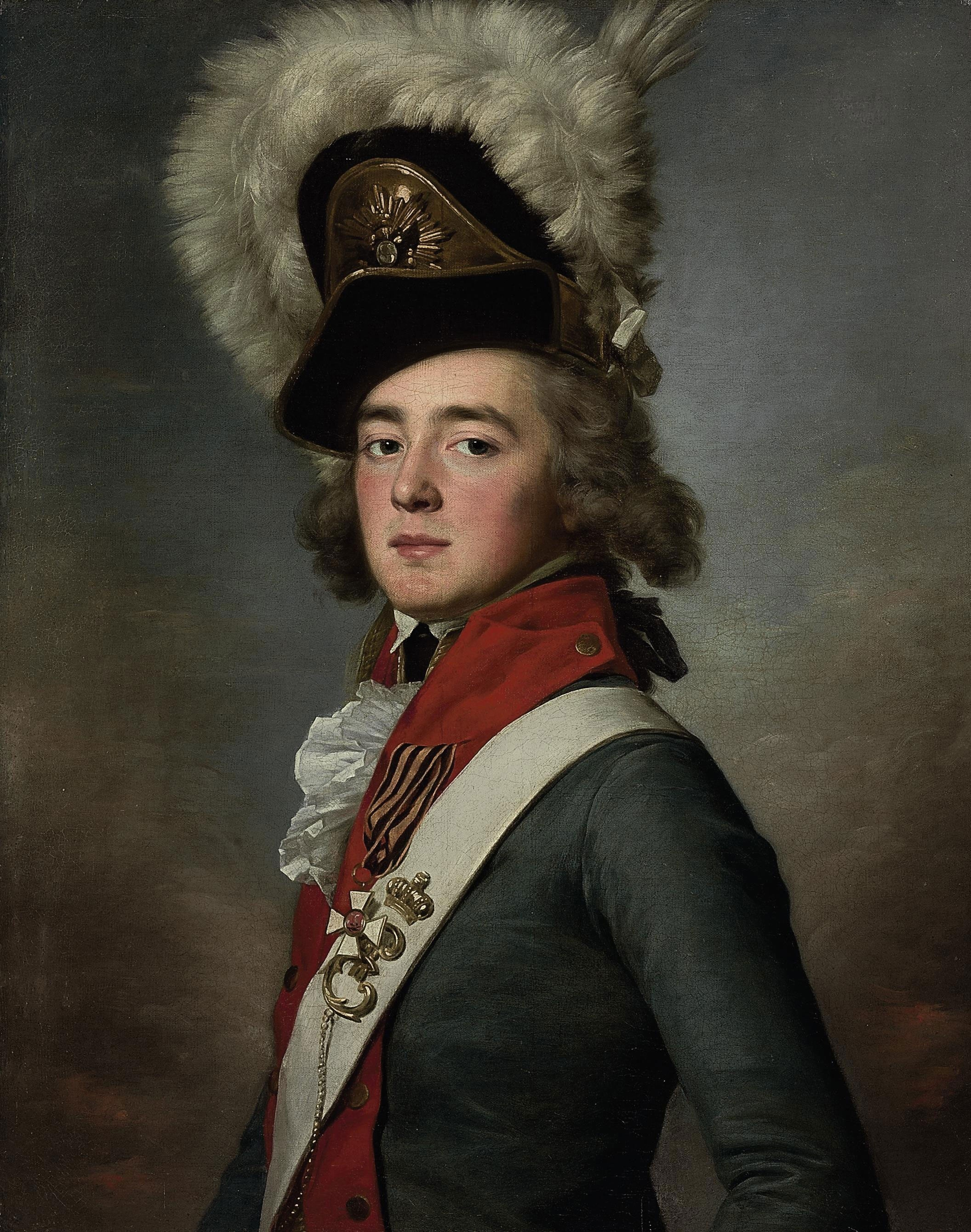
Count Valerian Zubov of Derbent, painted by Jean-Louis Voille (1791/1792)

Valerian was born into the powerful Russian noble Zubov family. As a young man Zubov had flattering prospects of a brilliant military career due to his brother Platon's ascendancy at Catherine II's court. He was reputed by contemporaries as "the handsomest man in Russia". The legend has it that the aged Empress flirted with him, secretly from his brother.

During her reign he was much lionized as a military hero of incredible valor. He was appointed General-Major and sent to assist Suvorov in quelling the Kościuszko Uprising in Poland, where he was said to treat both the Polish noblemen and their wives brazenly and "in the most lowly manner". During this stay in Poland, he married Princess Marianna Lubomirska (1773-1810), widow of Count Antoni Protazy Potocki, Teodor Lubomirski's adopted granddaughter and lost his left leg in the autumn of 1794 while crossing the Western Bug, as he was wounded by a cannonball.

Several months before Catherine's death, 24-year-old Zubov was invited to take charge of the army heading for Persia. The expedition, launched in 1796, initially under the motto of complying to the promise Russia had made 23 years earlier to Georgia to protect it against any Persian attempts to bring the country under its hegemony again, was now just one of another wars for regional hegemony that was going on for a long time between Turkey, Persia, and Imperial Russia.

Zubov started the expedition in a much promising manner, seizing Derbent in Dagestan in April 1796, and Baku by July of the same year. Catherine waxed jubilant at his rapid progress, which in two months repeated some of the gains of Peter the Great during the Russo-Persian War (1722-1723). By November, they were stationed at the confluence of the Araks and Kura Rivers, poised to attack mainland Iran. It was in that month that the Empress of Russia died and her son and successor Paul I, who detested the Zubovs and had other plans for the army, ordered the troops to retreat back to Russia. Zubov's return from his luckless expedition occasioned an ode by Gavrila Derzhavin, meditating on the fleeting nature of fortune and success.

== Sources ==
- Alexander, John T. (1989). Catherine the Great: Life and Legend. Oxford University Press. p. 321. ISBN 0199874301.
