= Sophia Razumovskaya =

Russian courtier (1746–1803)

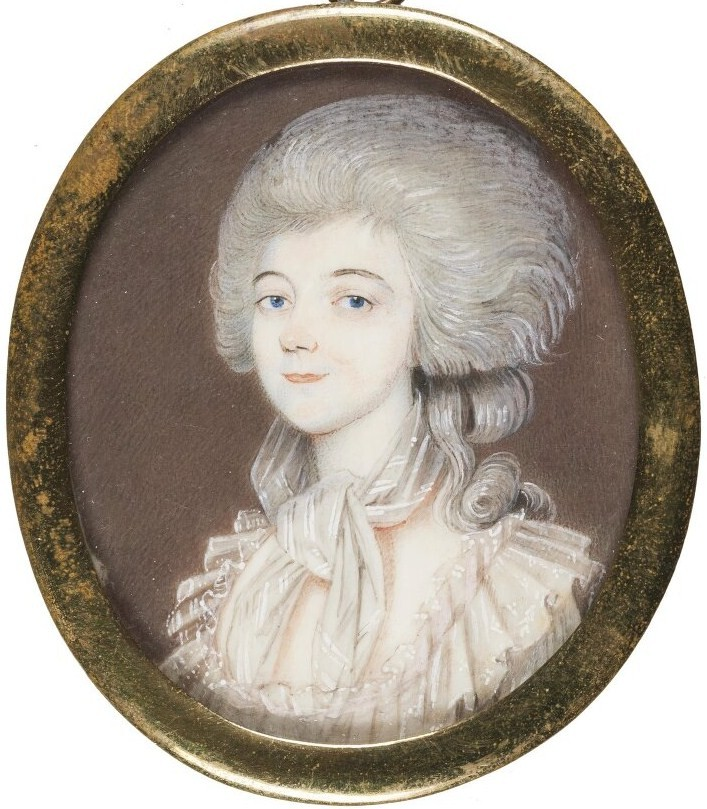
Portrait, 1780s

Sophia Stepanovna Razumovskaya (Russian: Софья Степановна Разумовская; née Ushakova (Ушакова); 11 September 1746 – 26 September 1803) was a Russian courtier. She served as maid of honour to empress Catherine the Great. She was married to Peter Kirillovich Razumovsky, and the mistress of Paul I of Russia prior to his marriage, with whom she had a son, Semyon Veliky (1772–1794).

== Life ==
Sophia Razumovskaya was born to Stephan Fedorovich Ushakov and Anna Semyonovna. She was appointed maid of honour to Catherine the Great. She married Mikhail Petrovich Czartoryski, but was early widowed.

She participated in the social life of the court and was known for her vivacious life style. Pending the plans to have Grand Duke Paul married, there were concerns as to whether he was sexually capable to have an heir, and Sophia was asked to investigate his sexual function by seducing him. She succeeded with her task and had a son with him, Semyon Veliky (1772–1794), whose upbringing was provided by the empress.

Paul married in 1773, and in 1776, Sophia remarried Count Peter Kirillovich Razumovskiy, son of field marshal Kirill Grigorievich Razumovsky. As her father-in-law protested and expressed his dislike of the marriage, it was likely not arranged, and the marriage is described as happy.

== Sources ==
- Издание вел. кн. Николая Михайловича. Русские портреты XVIII и XIX столетий. Т.3.Вып.3. No. 110
