= Coastal Monastery of Saint Sergius =

Russian Orthodox monastery

Coordinates: 59°51′12″N 30°5′24″E

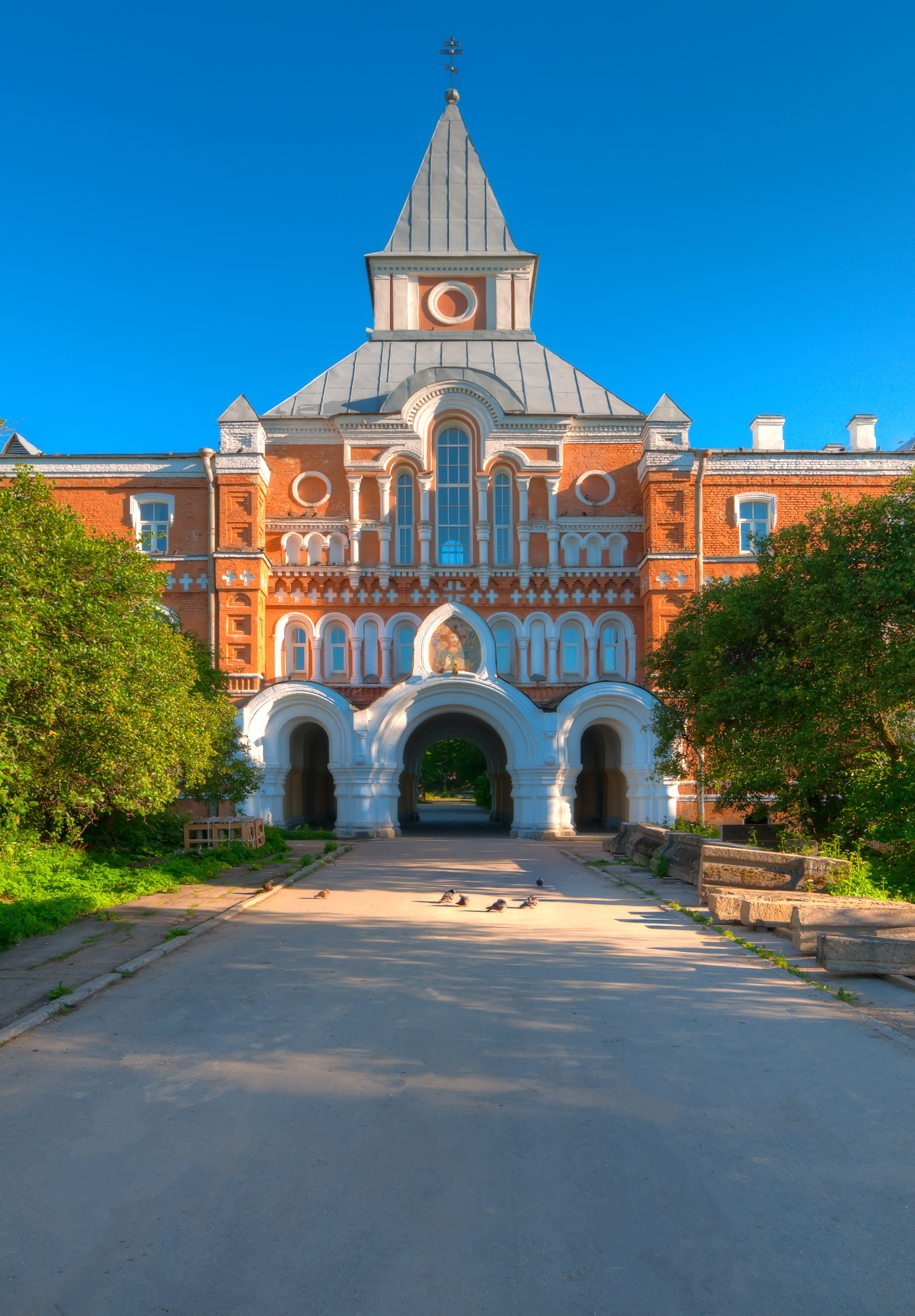
Main entrance to the monastery

The Coastal Monastery of St. Sergius (Сергиева Приморская пустынь) is a Russian Orthodox monastery in the coastal settlement of Strelna near St. Petersburg. It used to be one of the richest monasteries of the Russian Empire and formerly contained seven churches as well as many chapels.

== History ==
The poustinia was founded in 1734 as a branch of the great Trinity Lavra of St. Sergius in the immediate vicinity of the new Russian capital, St. Petersburg. Catherine Ivanovna, Peter the Great's niece, owned a manor on the bank of the Gulf of Finland. After her death Empress Anna presented the land to her confessor Varlaam, who was also in charge of the Trinity Lavra.

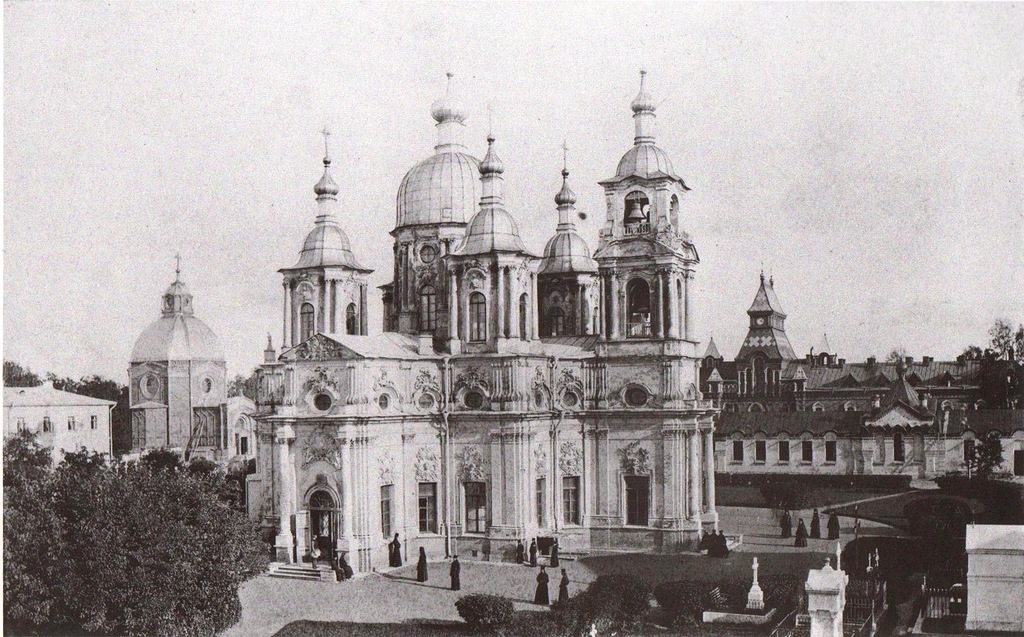
Trezzini's katholikon, as photographed by Count von Nostitz in the 1860s

The earliest buildings of the monastery, including the pentacupolar cathedral, the outer wall and the towers, were designed by Pietro Antonio Trezzini. They were Baroque in character. It was not until 1764 that Strelna Monastery was designated a separate poustinia. Many monks from Strelna entered the Navy to serve as ship chaplains. Saint Herman of Alaska was one of those monks.

The golden age of the monastery is associated with Saint Ignatius Bryanchaninov who was in charge of the poustinia between 1834 and 1857. Bryanchaninov had the monastery transformed by Aleksey Gornostayev into a showcase for the Russian Revival style. The new Ascension Cathedral was built to a Neo-Byzantine design.

After the Russian Revolution the Soviets suppressed the monastery (1931), destroyed the cemetery and adapted the grounds to serve as a labor camp, or a work farm. The buildings sustained further damage during World War II. After the property was occupied by a police school in the early 1960s, Trezzini's cathedral and several other churches were blown up. The remaining buildings were returned to the Russian Orthodox Church in 1993.

== Burials ==
Some of the noblest and richest families of Imperial Russia, including the Galitzines, the Stroganovs and the Yusupovs, patronised the monastery and had their burial vaults on the grounds. The local cemetery is the burial site of a number of Russian nobles, including the Zubov brothers, Prince Alexander Gorchakov, Duke Peter Georgievich of Oldenburg, and court architect Andrei Stackenschneider. The graves of the Dukes of Oldenburg and Leuchtenberg, both closely related to the Russian imperial family, were either lost or desecrated during the Soviet period.
