= Paul I of Russia =

Emperor of Russia from 1796 to 1801

Paul I
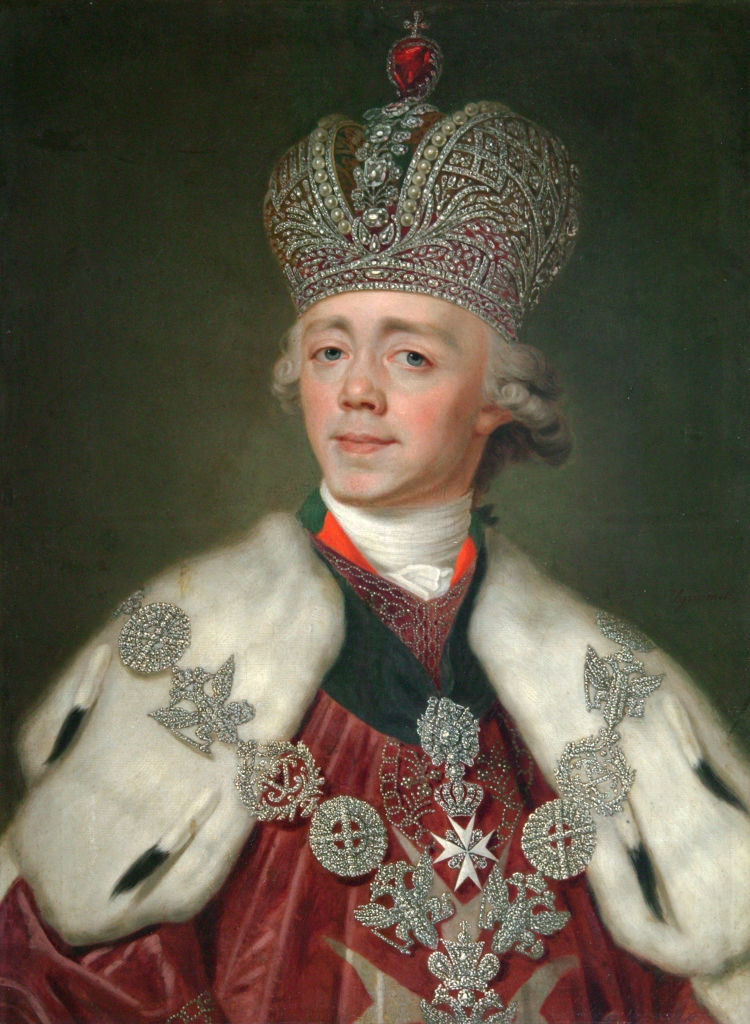
- 1800 portrait

Emperor of Russia
- Reign: 17 (6) November 1796 – 23 (11) March 1801
- Coronation: 5 (16) April 1797
- Predecessor: Catherine II
- Successor: Alexander I

Duke of Holstein-Gottorp
- Reign: 9 July 1763 – 23 (11) March 1801
- Born: 1 October 1754; Summer Palace, Saint Petersburg, Russia
- Died: 24 March 1801 (aged 46); St Michael's Castle, Saint Petersburg, Russia
- Cause of death: Assassination
- Burial: Peter and Paul Cathedral
- Spouses: Wilhelmina Louisa of Hesse-Darmstadt (m. 1773; died 1776); Sophie Dorothea of Württemberg (m. 1776)
- Issue detail: Alexander I of Russia; Grand Duke Konstantin Pavlovich; Alexandra Pavlovna, Palatina of Hungary; Elena Pavlovna, Hereditary Princess of Mecklenburg-Schwerin; Maria Pavlovna, Grand Duchess of Saxe-Weimar-Eisenach; Catherine Pavlovna, Queen of Württemberg; Grand Duchess Olga Pavlovna; Anna Pavlovna, Queen of the Netherlands; Nicholas I of Russia; Grand Duke Michael Pavlovich
Names
- Pável Petróvich Románov; Russian: Па́вел Петро́вич Рома́нов
- House: Holstein-Gottorp-Romanov
- Father: Peter III of Russia
- Mother: Catherine II of Russia
- Religion: Russian Orthodox

Paul I (Russian: Па́вел I Петро́вич, romanized: Pavel I Petrovich; 1 October [O.S. 20 September] 1754 – 23 March [O.S. 11 March] 1801) was Emperor of Russia from 1796 until his assassination in 1801.

Paul remained overshadowed by his mother, Catherine the Great, for most of his life. He adopted the laws of succession to the Russian throne—rules that lasted until the end of the Romanov dynasty and of the Russian Empire. He also imposed the first limitations on serfdom with the Manifesto of three-day corvee, sought to curtail the privileges of the nobility, pursued various military reforms which were highly unpopular among officers and was known for his unpredictable behavior, all of which contributed to the conspiracy that took his life.

In 1799, he brought Russia into the Second Coalition against Revolutionary France alongside Britain and Austria; the Russian forces achieved several victories at first but withdrew after facing setbacks. Paul then realigned Russia with France and led the creation of the Second League of Armed Neutrality to oppose Britain after Napoleon's rise to power. Toward the end of his reign, he added Kartli and Kakheti in Eastern Georgia to the Russian Empire. He was planning a joint invasion of British India with the French before being killed in a fight with his own officers who were trying to force his abdication. He was succeeded by his son Alexander I.

He was Grand Master of the Russian tradition of the Knights Hospitaller from 1799 to 1801 and ordered the construction of a number of priories of the Order of Malta.

== Early years ==
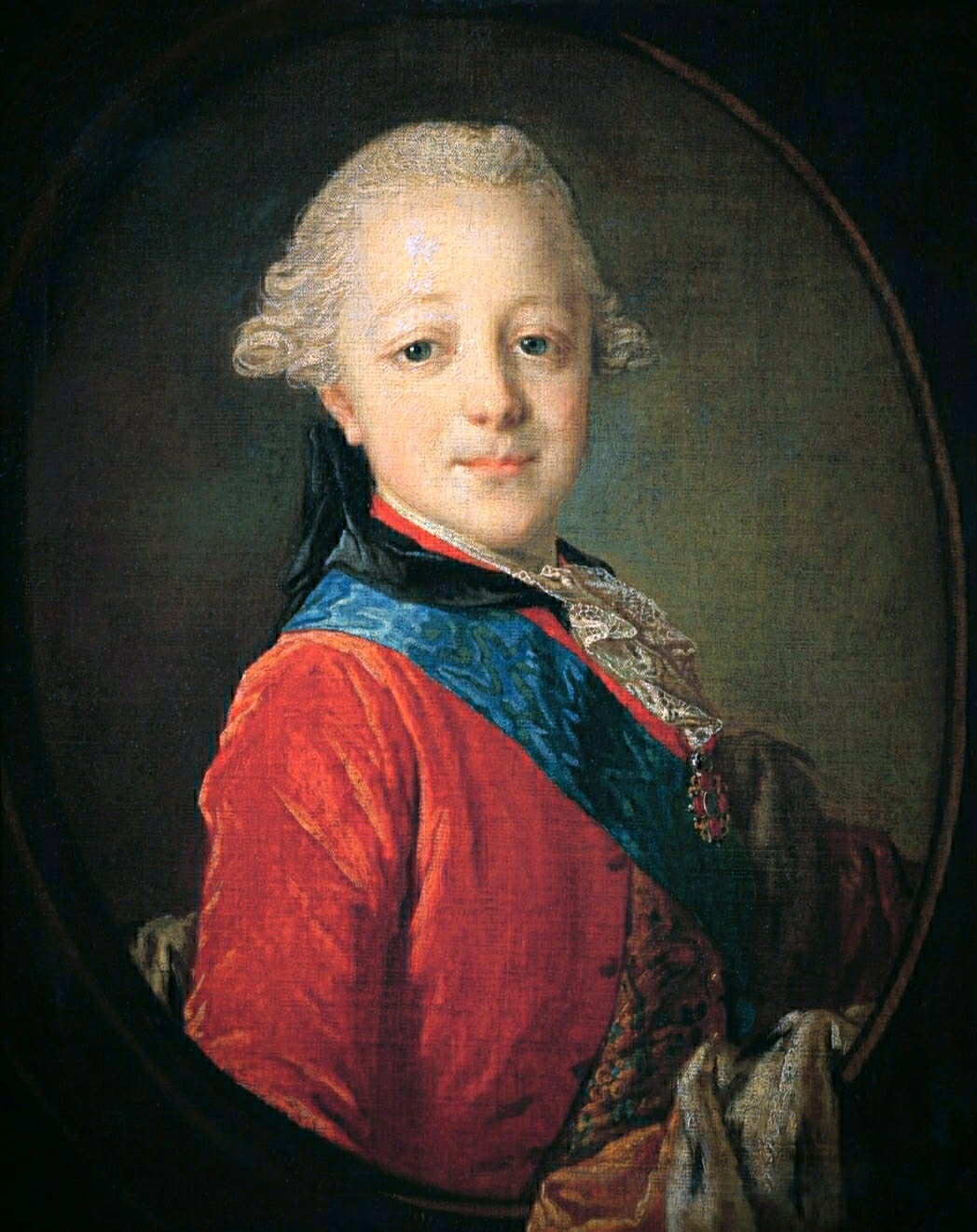
Tsarevich Paul as a child, by Fyodor Rokotov, 1761

Paul was son of Emperor Peter III, (nephew and anointed heir of the Empress Elizabeth, the second-eldest daughter of Tsar Peter the Great), and his wife, Empress Catherine II. Catherine was born Sophie of Anhalt-Zerbst, daughter of a minor German prince, who married into the Russian Romanov dynasty. She subsequently deposed Paul's father, Peter III, to take the Russian throne and become Catherine the Great. While Catherine hinted in the first edition of her memoirs published by Alexander Herzen in 1859 that her lover Sergei Saltykov was Paul's biological father, she later recanted and asserted in the final edition that Peter III was Paul's true father. Simon Sebag Montefiore argues that while Paul's true paternity is "impossible to know ... he did look and behave like Peter."

Paul was taken almost immediately after birth by the Empress Elizabeth, and had limited contact with his mother. As a boy, he was reported to be intelligent and good-looking, but sickly. His pug-nosed facial features in later life are attributed to an attack of typhus, from which he suffered in 1771. Paul was put in the charge of a trustworthy governor, Nikita Ivanovich Panin, and of competent tutors. Panin's nephew went on to become one of Paul's assassins. One of Paul's tutors, Poroshin, complained that he was "always in a hurry", acting and speaking without reflection.

== Under Catherine II ==
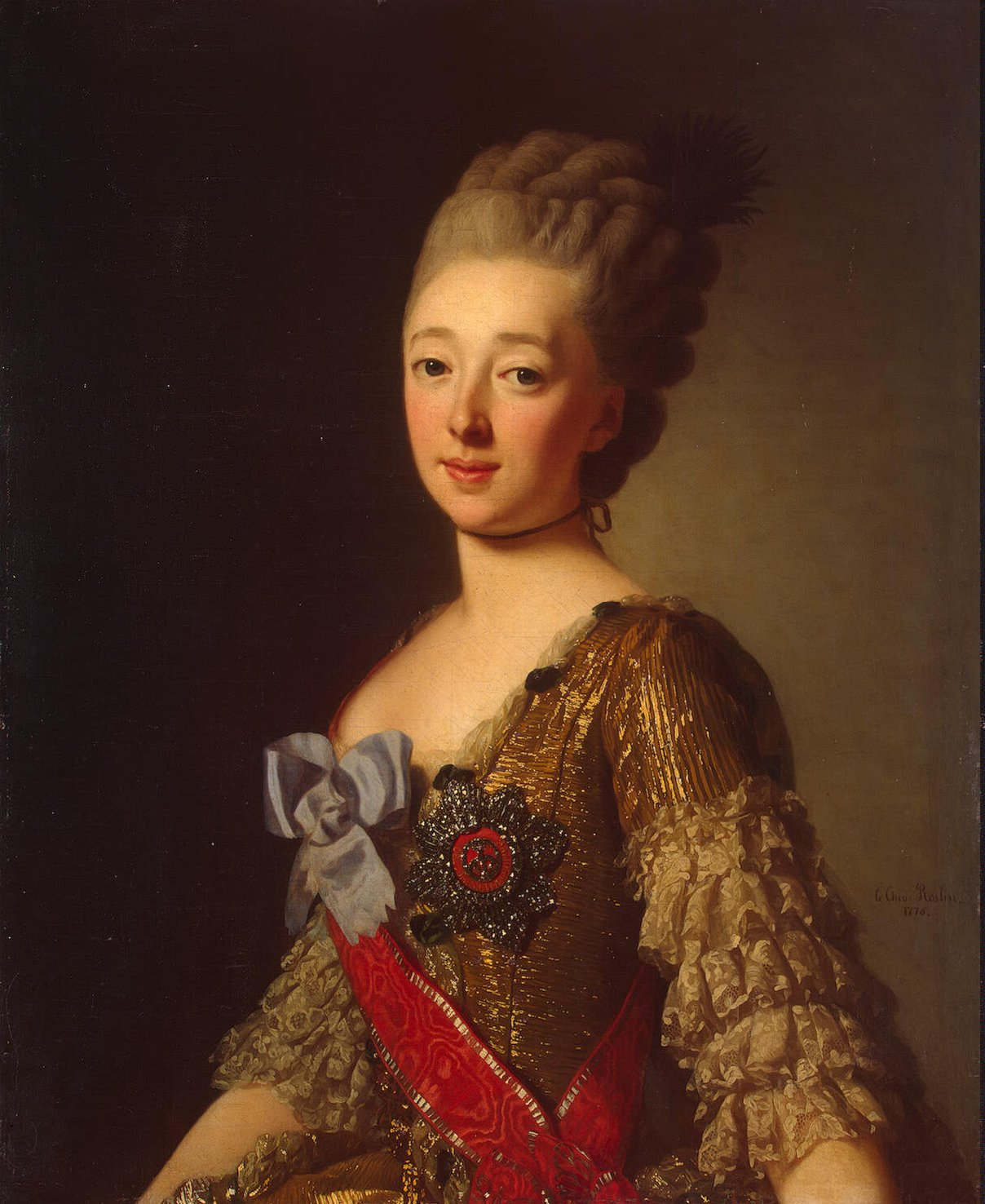
Natalia Alexeievna by Alexander Roslin 1776

Empress Elizabeth died in 1762, when Paul was eight years old, and he became crown prince with the accession of his father to the throne as Peter III. However, within a matter of months, Paul's mother engineered a coup to depose her husband. Peter soon died in prison, either killed by Catherine's supporters or due to a fit of apoplexy when exerting himself in a dispute with Prince Feodor, one of his jailers. The 8-year-old Paul retained his position as Tsesarevich, or heir apparent.

In 1772, Paul took a mistress, named Sophia Razumovskaya, and had a child with her, named Semyon Veliky (born 1772). Learning about this, Catherine sent Sophia to marry the son of a field marshal, and went to find Paul a wife.

When her son and heir, Paul, turned eighteen, he and his adviser, Panin, believed he was the rightful tsar of Russia, as the only son of Peter III. His adviser had also taught him that the rule of women endangered good leadership, which was why he was so interested in gaining the throne. Distracting him, Catherine took trouble to find Paul a wife among the minor princesses of the Holy Roman Empire. She chose Princess Wilhelmina of Hesse-Darmstadt, who acquired the Russian name "Natalia Alexeievna", a daughter of Ludwig IX, Landgrave of Hesse-Darmstadt. The bride's older sister, Frederika Louisa, was already married to the Crown Prince of Prussia. Around this time, Catherine allowed Paul to attend the council in order that he might be trained for his work as Emperor. Wilhelmina and their child died in childbirth on 15 April 1776, three years after the wedding. It soon became even clearer to Catherine that Paul wanted power, including his separate court. There was talk of having both Paul and his mother co-rule Russia, but Catherine narrowly avoided it. A fierce rivalry began between them, as Catherine knew she could never truly trust her son, as his claim to the throne was superior to hers. Paul coveted his mother's position, and by the laws of succession prevalent then, it was rightfully his.

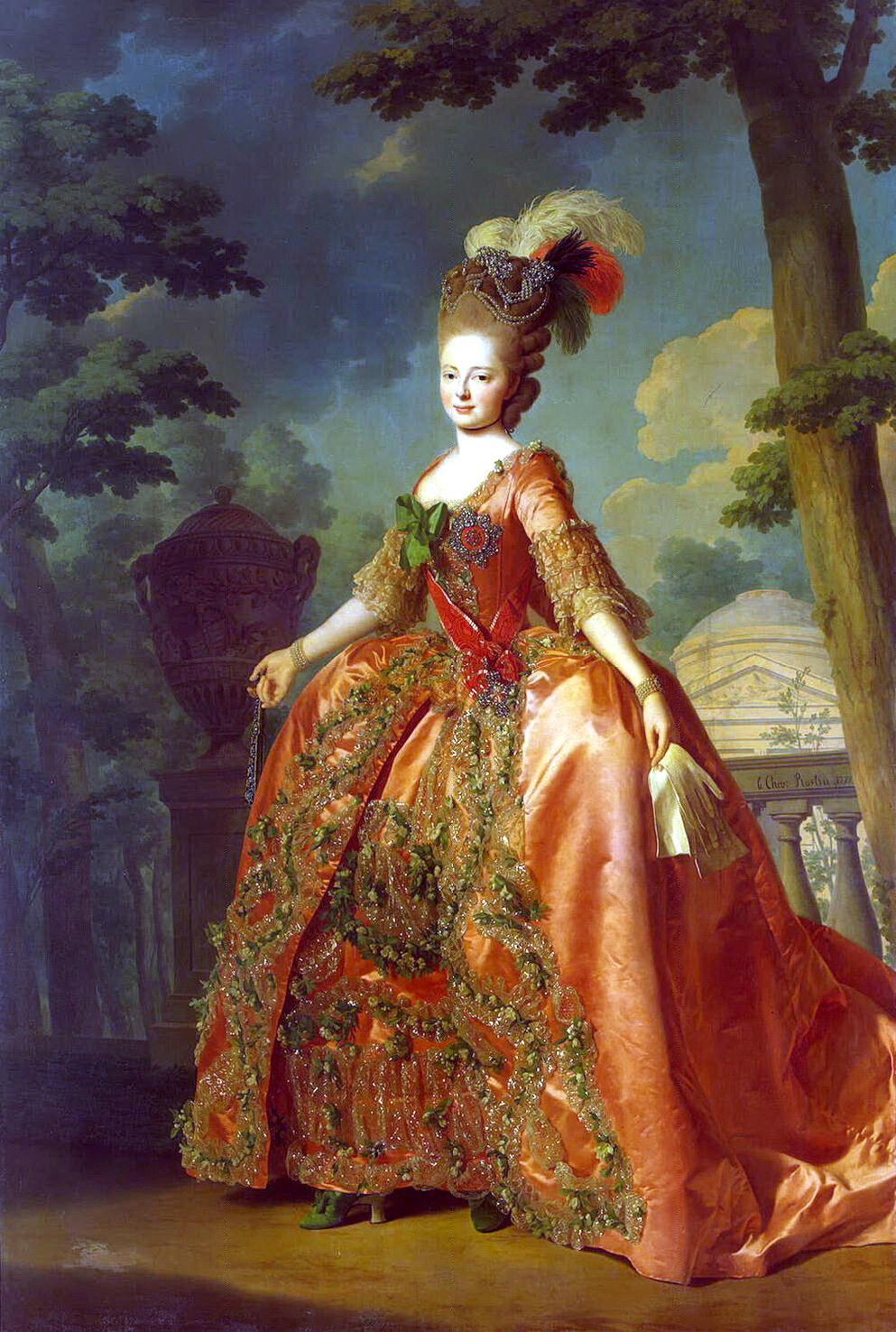
Maria Feodorovna, portrait by Alexander Roslin

After her daughter-in-law's death, Catherine began work forthwith on the project of finding another wife for Paul, and on 7 October 1776, less than six months after the death of his first wife and their child, Paul married again. The bride was the beautiful Sophia Dorothea of Württemberg, who received the new Russian name Maria Feodorovna. Their first child, Alexander, was born in 1777, within a year of the wedding, and on this occasion the Empress gave Paul an estate, Pavlovsk. Paul and his wife gained leave to travel through western Europe in 1781–1782. In 1783, the Empress granted him another estate, Gatchina Palace, where he was allowed to maintain a brigade of soldiers whom he drilled on the Prussian model, an unpopular stance at the time.

=== Relationship with Catherine the Great ===
Catherine and her son and heir Paul maintained a distant relationship throughout her reign. Empress Elizabeth had taken up the child and proved an obsessive but incapable caretaker, as she had not raised children of her own. Paul was supervised by a variety of caregivers. Roderick McGrew briefly relates the neglect to which the infant heir was sometimes subject: "On one occasion he fell out of his crib and slept the night away unnoticed on the floor." Even after Elizabeth's death, relations with Catherine hardly improved. Paul was often jealous of the favours she would shower upon her lovers. In one instance, the empress gave to one of her favourites 50,000 rubles on her birthday, while Paul received a cheap watch. Paul's early isolation from his mother created a distance between them that later events would reinforce. She never considered inviting him to share power in governing Russia. Once Paul's son Alexander was born, it appeared that she had found a more suitable heir. The use made of his name by the rebel Yemelyan Pugachev, who impersonated his father Peter, tended no doubt to render Paul's position more difficult.

Catherine's absolute power and the delicate balance of courtier status greatly influenced the relationship at Court with Paul, who openly disregarded his mother's opinions. Paul adamantly protested his mother's policies, writing a veiled criticism in his Reflections, a dissertation on military reform. In it he directly disparaged expansionist warfare in favour of a more defensive military policy. Unenthusiastically received by his mother, the Reflections questioned her authority and added weight to her suspicion of an internal conspiracy with Paul at its centre. For a courtier to have openly supported or shown intimacy towards Paul, especially following this publication, would have meant political suicide.

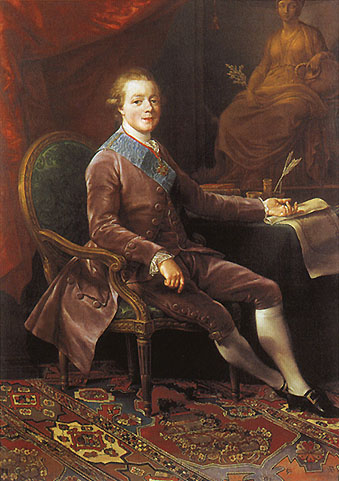
Grand Duke Paul Petrovich, after Pompeo Batoni, 1782-1787

Paul spent the following years away from the Imperial Court, content to remain at his private estates at Gatchina Palace with his growing family and perform Prussian drill exercises. As Catherine grew older, she became less concerned that her son attend court functions; her attentions focused primarily on the future Emperor Alexander I.

It was not until 1787 that Catherine may have in fact decided to exclude her son from succession. After Alexander and his brother Constantine were born, she had them placed under her charge, just as Elizabeth had done with Paul. That Catherine grew to favour Alexander as successor rather than Paul is unsurprising. She met secretly with Alexander's tutor, Frédéric-César de La Harpe, to discuss his pupil's ascension, and attempted to convince Alexander's mother Maria to sign a proposal authorizing her son's legitimacy. Both efforts proved fruitless, and though Alexander agreed to his grandmother's wishes, he remained respectful of his father's position as immediate successor to the Russian throne.

== Accession to the throne ==
Imperial monogram of Paul I

Catherine suffered a stroke on 17 November 1796, and died without regaining consciousness. Paul's first act as emperor was to inquire about and, if possible, destroy her testament, as he feared it would exclude him from succession and leave the throne to Alexander. These fears may have contributed to Paul's promulgation of the Pauline Laws, which established the strict principle of primogeniture in the House of Romanov, leaving the throne to the next male heir.

The army, then poised to attack Persia in accordance with Catherine's last design, was recalled to the capital within one month of Paul's accession. In a remarkable poem, the Russian court poet Derzhavin commented bitterly on the inglorious return from that expedition of its commander Count Valerian Zubov, who was the youthful brother of Prince Platon Zubov, the lover of the Empress Саtherine.

Upon his death in 1762, Peter III had been buried without any honors in the Annunciation Church at the Alexander Nevsky Monastery in St. Petersburg. Immediately after the death of his mother, Paul ordered his father's remains transferred, first to the church in the Winter Palace and then to the Saints Peter and Paul Cathedral, Saint Petersburg, the burial site of the Romanovs. 60-year-old Count Alexei Orlov, who had played a role in deposing Peter III and possibly also in his death, was made to walk in the funeral cortege, holding the Imperial Crown of Russia as he walked in front of Peter's coffin. Peter III had never been crowned so at the time of his reburial, Paul personally performed the ritual of coronation on his remains. Paul responded to the rumour of his illegitimacy by parading his descent from Peter the Great. The inscription on the monument to the first Emperor of Russia near the St. Michael's Castle reads in Russian "To the Great-Grandfather from the Great-Grandson". This is an allusion to the Latin "PETRO PRIMO CATHARINA SECUNDA", the dedication by Catherine on the 'Bronze Horseman' statue of Peter the Great.

== Purported eccentricities ==
Paul was idealistic and capable of great generosity, but he was also mercurial and capable of vindictiveness. In spite of doubts of his legitimacy, he greatly resembled his father, Peter III, and other Romanovs as well and shared the same character. During the first year of his reign, Paul emphatically reversed many of his mother's policies. Although he accused many of Jacobinism, he allowed Catherine's best known critic, Alexander Radishchev, to return from Siberian exile. Besides Radishchev, he liberated Nikolay Novikov from Schlüsselburg fortress, and also Tadeusz Kościuszko, yet after liberation both were confined to their own estates under police supervision. He viewed the Russian nobility as decadent and corrupt, and was determined to transform them into a disciplined, principled, loyal caste resembling a medieval chivalric order. To those few who conformed to his view of a modern-day knight (e.g., his favourites Mikhail Kutuzov, Aleksey Arakcheyev, and Feodor Rostopchin) he granted more serfs during the five years of his reign than his mother had presented to her lovers during her thirty-four years. Those who did not share his chivalric views were dismissed or lost their places at court: seven field marshals and 333 generals fell into this category.

Paul made several idiosyncratic and deeply unpopular attempts to reform the Imperial Russian Army. Under Catherine's reign, Grigori Potemkin introduced new uniforms that were cheap, comfortable, practical and designed in a distinctly Russian style. Paul decided to fulfill his father Peter III's intention of introducing Prussian uniforms. Impractical for active duty, these were deeply unpopular with the men, as was the effort required to maintain them.

His love of parades and ceremony was not well-liked either. He ordered that Wachtparad ("Watch parades") take place early every morning in the parade ground of the palace, regardless of the weather conditions. He would personally sentence soldiers to be flogged if they made a mistake, and on one occasion ordered a Guards regiment to march to Siberia after they became disordered during maneuvers, although he changed his mind after they had walked about 10 miles (16 km). He attempted to reform the organization of the army in 1796 by introducing The Infantry Codes, a series of guidelines for the army based largely upon show and glamour. But his greatest commander, Alexander Suvorov, completely ignored them, believing them to be worthless. At great expense, he built three palaces in or around the Russian capital. Much was made of his courtly love affair with Anna Lopukhina.

Emperor Paul also ordered the bones of Grigori Potemkin, the famed military commander and one of his mother's lovers, dug out of his grave and scattered.

== Foreign affairs ==
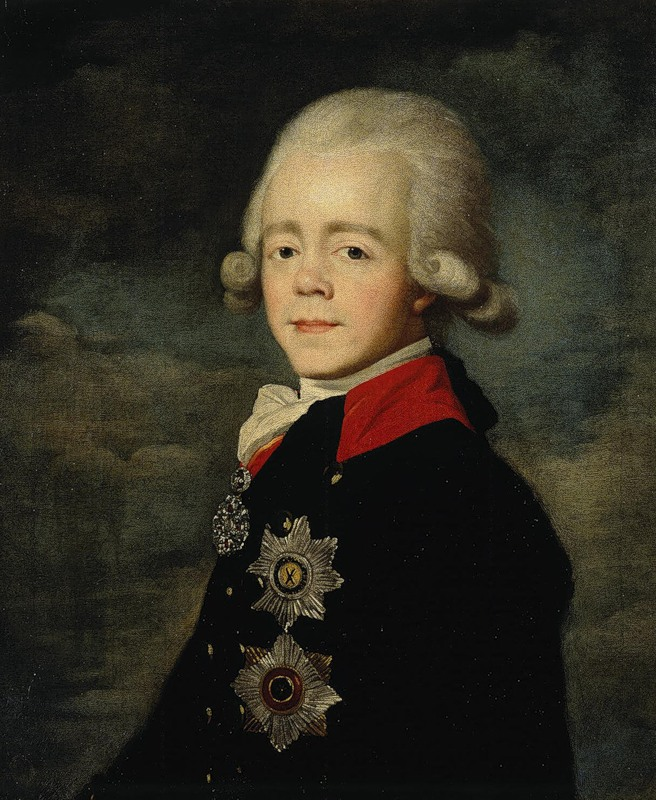
Paul I in the early 1790s

Paul's early foreign policy can largely be seen as reactions against his mother's. In foreign policy, this meant that he opposed the many expansionary wars she fought and instead preferred to pursue a more peaceful, diplomatic path. Immediately upon taking the throne, he recalled all troops outside Russian borders, including the struggling expedition Catherine II had sent to conquer Qajar Iran through the Caucasus and the 60,000 men she had promised to Britain and Austria to help them defeat the French. Paul hated the French before their revolution, and afterwards, with their republican and anti-religious views, he detested them even more. In addition to this, he knew French expansion hurt Russian interests, but he recalled his mother's troops primarily because he firmly opposed wars of expansion. He also believed that Russia needed substantial governmental and military reforms to avoid an economic collapse and a revolution, before Russia could wage war on foreign soil.

Paul offered to mediate between Austria and France through Prussia and pushed Austria to make peace, but the two countries made peace without his assistance, signing the Treaty of Campoformio in October 1797. This treaty, with its affirmation of French control over islands in the Mediterranean and the partitioning of the Republic of Venice, upset Paul, who saw it as creating more instability in the region and displaying France's ambitions in the Mediterranean. In response, he offered asylum to the Prince of Condé and his army, as well as the future Louis XVIII, both of whom had been forced out of Austria by the treaty. By this point, the French Republic had overrun Northern Italy, the Dutch Republic and Switzerland, establishing republics with constitutions in each, and Paul felt that Russia now needed to play an active role in Europe in order to overthrow what the republic had created and restore traditional authorities. In this goal he found a willing ally in the Austrian chancellor Baron Thugut, who hated the French and loudly criticized revolutionary principles. Britain joined Austria and Russia to stop French expansion, liberate territories under their control and re-establish old monarchies. The only major power in Europe who did not join Paul in his anti-French campaign was Prussia, whose distrust of Austria and the security they got from their current relationship with France prevented them from joining the Second Coalition. Despite the Prussians' reluctance, Paul decided to move ahead with the war, promising 60,000 men to support Austria in Italy and 45,000 men to help Britain in north Germany and Holland.

Another important factor in Paul's decision to go to war with France was the island of Malta, the home of the Knights Hospitaller. In addition to Malta, the Order had priories in the Catholic countries of Europe that held large estates and paid the revenue from them to the Order. In 1796, the Order approached Paul about the Priory of Poland, which had been in a state of neglect and paid no revenue for 100 years, and was now on Russian land. Paul as a child had read the histories of the Order and was impressed by their honor and connection to the old order it represented. He relocated the Priories of Poland to St. Petersburg in January 1797. The knights responded by making him a protector of the Order in August of that same year, an honour he had not expected but, in keeping with his chivalric ideals, he happily accepted.

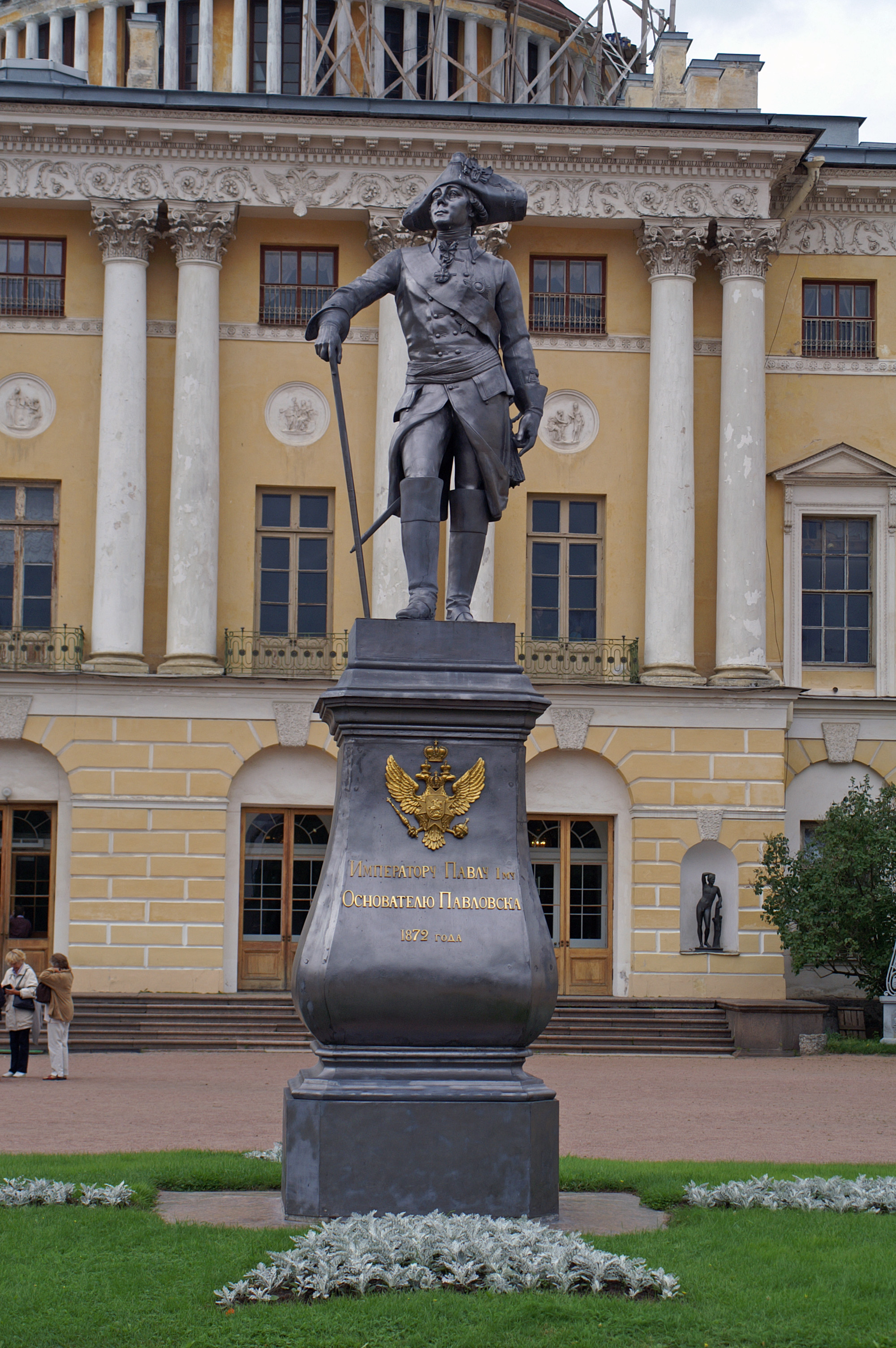
A statue of Emperor Paul in front of the Pavlovsk Palace

In June 1798, the French occupied Malta; this greatly offended Paul. In September, the Priory of St. Petersburg declared that Grand Master Ferdinand von Hompesch zu Bolheim had betrayed the Order by "selling" Malta to Napoleon. A month later the Priory elected Paul Grand Master on 24 November 1798, according to the 1847 edition of the Glossary of Heraldry. This election resulted in the establishment of the Russian tradition of the Knights Hospitaller within the Imperial Orders of Russia. The election of the sovereign of an Orthodox nation as the head of a Catholic order was controversial, and it was some time before the Holy See or any of the Order's other priories approved it. This delay created political issues between Paul, who insisted on defending his legitimacy, and the priories' respective countries. Though recognition of Paul's election would become a more divisive issue later in his reign, the election immediately gave Paul, as Grand Master of the Order, another reason to fight the French Republic: to reclaim the Order's ancestral home.

The Russian army in Italy played the role of an auxiliary force sent to support the Austrians, though the Austrians offered the position of chief commander over all the allied armies to Alexander Suvorov, a distinguished Russian general. Under Suvorov, the allies managed to push the French out of Italy, though they suffered heavy losses. However, by this point in time, cracks had started to appear in the Russo-Austrian alliance, due to their different goals in Italy. While Paul and Suvorov wanted the liberation and restoration of the Italian monarchies, the Austrians sought territorial acquisitions in Italy, and were willing to sacrifice later Russian support to acquire them. The Austrians, therefore, happily saw Suvorov and his army out of Italy in 1799 to go meet up with the army of Alexander Korsakov, at the time assisting the Austrian Archduke Charles to expel the French armies currently occupying Switzerland. However, the campaign in Switzerland had become a stalemate, without much activity on either side until the Austrians withdrew. Because this happened before Korsakov and Suvorov could unite their forces, the French could attack their armies one at a time, destroying Korsakov's and forcing Suvorov to fight his way out of Switzerland, suffering heavy losses. Suvorov, shamed, blamed the Austrians for the terrible defeat in Switzerland, as did his furious sovereign. This defeat, combined with Austria's refusal to reinstate the old monarchies in Italy and their disrespect of the Russian flag during the taking of Ancona, led to the formal cessation of the alliance in October 1799.

Although by the fall of 1799 the Russo-Austrian alliance had more or less fallen apart, Paul still cooperated willingly with the British. Together, they planned to invade the Batavian Republic, and through that country attack France proper. Unlike Austria, neither Russia nor Britain appeared to have any secret territorial ambitions: they both simply sought to defeat the French.

The Anglo-Russian invasion of Holland started well, with a British victory at the Battle of Callantsoog on 27 August 1799. By the time the Russian army arrived in September, however, the allies found themselves faced with bad weather, poor coordination, and unexpectedly fierce resistance from the Batavian and French armies, and their success evaporated. As the month wore on, the weather worsened and the allies suffered more and more defeats, eventually signing an armistice in October 1799. The Russians suffered three-quarters of allied losses and surviving Russian troops were sent by the British to the Isle of Wight after the retreat, as it was illegal for foreign troops to enter Britain. The invasion's defeat and the perceived poor treatment of Russian troops by Britain strained Anglo-Russian relations, but a definitive break did not occur until later. The reasons for this break are less clear and simple than those of the split with Austria, but several key events occurred over the winter of 1799–1800 that helped: France released 7,000 Russian prisoners of war that Britain had refused to ransom; Paul grew closer to Denmark–Norway and Sweden, whose claim to neutral shipping rights angered Britain; Paul recalled Britain's ambassador to Russia Charles Whitworth in 1800 and the first Pitt ministry did not replace him, without giving any clear reason why; and Britain, needing to choose between their two allies, chose Austria, who were seen as more reliable than the Russians.

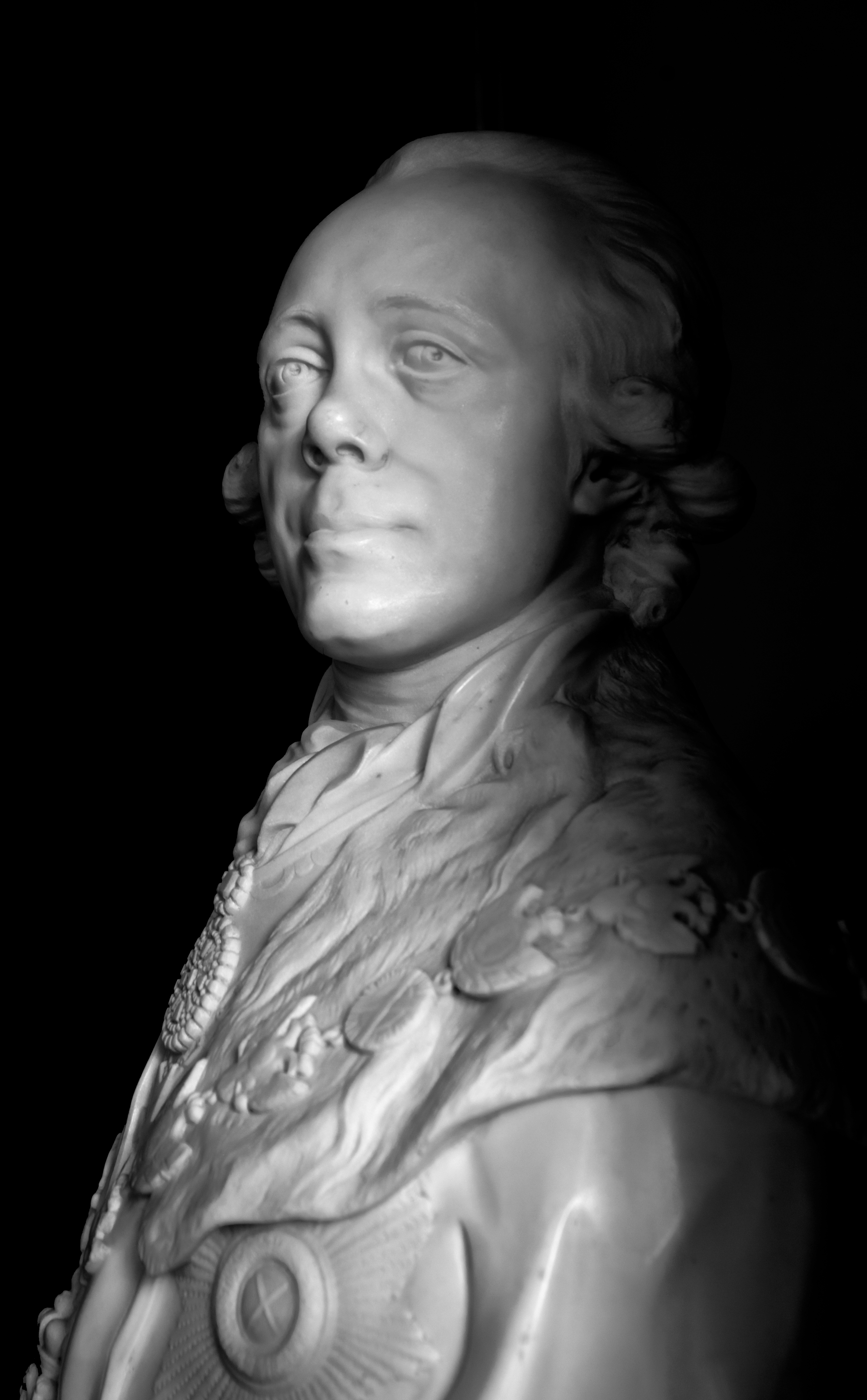
Portrait of Paul I of Russia by F. Shubin, marble, 1800, Russian Museum, Saint-Petersburg

Finally, two events occurred in rapid succession that destroyed the Anglo-Russian alliance completely: first, in July 1800, the Royal Navy seized a Danish frigate, prompting Paul to close all British factories in St. Petersburg and impound all British merchantmen and cargo in Russian ports; second, even though this crisis was resolved, Paul was incensed by Britain's refusal to hand Malta over to the Knights Hospitaller– and thus to Paul– when they captured it from France in September 1800. To force Britain to hand over Malta, Paul seized all British vessels in Russian ports, sent their crews to concentration camps and took British traders hostage. Over the next winter, he went further, using the Second League of Armed Neutrality he formed with Sweden, Denmark and Prussia to prepare the Baltic against possible attacks by the Royal Navy and prevent them from searching neutral merchant vessels, along with freezing all British trade in Northern Europe. As France had already closed most of Western and Southern Europe to British trade, Britain, which relied heavily upon imports such as timber, naval products, and grain, reacted fast to Paul's aggression. In March 1801, Britain sent a fleet under Vice-Admiral Horatio Nelson to Denmark, defeating a Danish fleet off Copenhagen in the beginning of April. Nelson's fleet then sailed towards St. Petersburg, reaching Reval on 14 May 1801, but after the conspiracy assassinated Paul on 23 March 1801, the new Tsar Alexander opened peace negotiations with Britain shortly after taking the throne.

The most original aspect of Paul I's foreign policy was his rapprochement with France after the coalition fell apart. Several scholars have argued that this change in position, radical though it seemed, made sense, as Bonaparte became First Consul and made France a more conservative state, consistent with Paul's view of the world. Paul also decided to send an army to invade British India, as Britain itself was almost impervious to direct attack, being an island nation with a formidable navy, but the British had left their Indian possessions largely unguarded and would have great difficulty staving off a force that came by land to attack it. The British themselves considered this enough of a problem that they signed three treaties with Persia, in 1801, 1809 and 1812, to guard against a European army invading India through Central Asia. Paul sought to attack the British where they were weakest: through their commerce and colonies. Throughout his reign, his policies focused reestablishing peace and the balance of power in Europe, while supporting autocracy and old monarchies, without seeking to expand Russia's borders.

=== Irano-Georgian matters ===
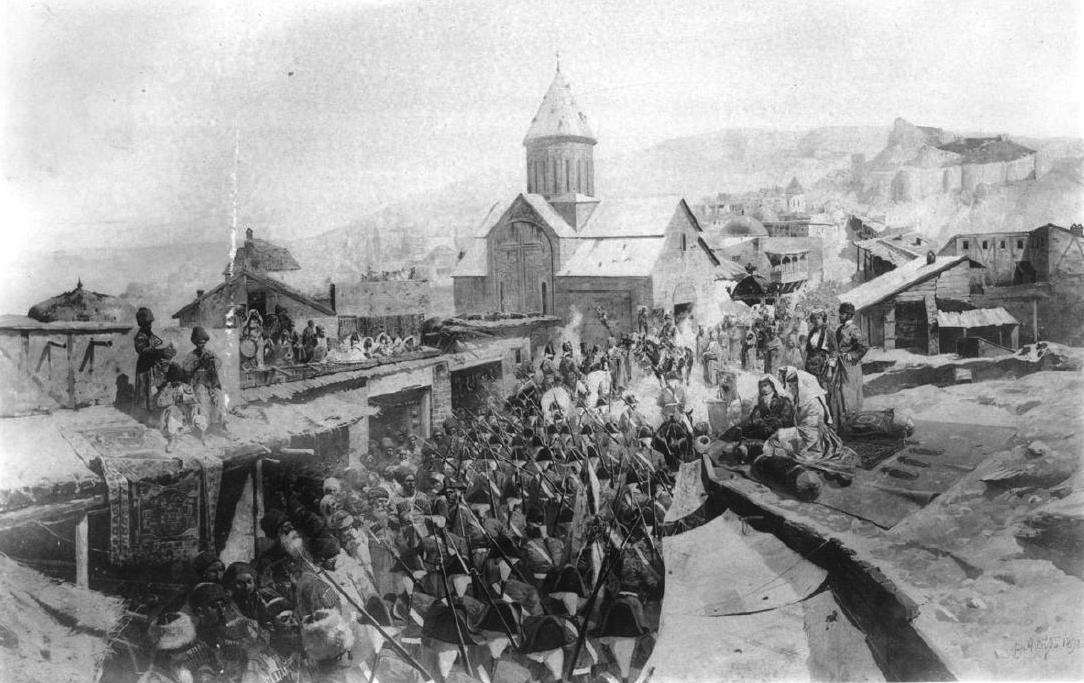
Entrance of the Russian troops in Tiflis, 26 November 1799, by Franz Roubaud, 1886

In lieu of Russia's failure to honour the terms of the Treaty of Georgievsk, Qajar Iran reinvaded Georgia. Georgian rulers felt they had nowhere else to turn now as Georgia was again re-subjugated by Iran. Tbilisi was captured and burnt to the ground, and eastern Georgia reconquered. However, Agha Mohammad Khan, Persia's ruler, was assassinated in 1797 in Shusha, after which the Persian grip on Georgia softened again. Erekle, King of Kartli-Kakheti, still dreaming of a united Georgia, died a year later. After his death, a civil war broke out over the succession to the throne of Kartli-Kakheti, and one of the rival candidates called on Russia to intervene and decide matters. On 8 January 1801, Tsar Paul I signed a decree on the incorporation of Georgia (Kartli-Kakheti) within the Russian Empire, which was confirmed by Tsar Alexander I on 12 September 1801. The Georgian envoy in Saint Petersburg, Garsevan Chavchavadze, reacted with a note of protest that was presented to the Russian vice-chancellor Alexander Kurakin. In May 1801, after Paul's death, Russian General Carl Heinrich von Knorring removed the Georgian heir to the throne, David Batonishvili, from power and deployed a provisional government headed by General Ivan Petrovich Lazarev.

== Assassination ==
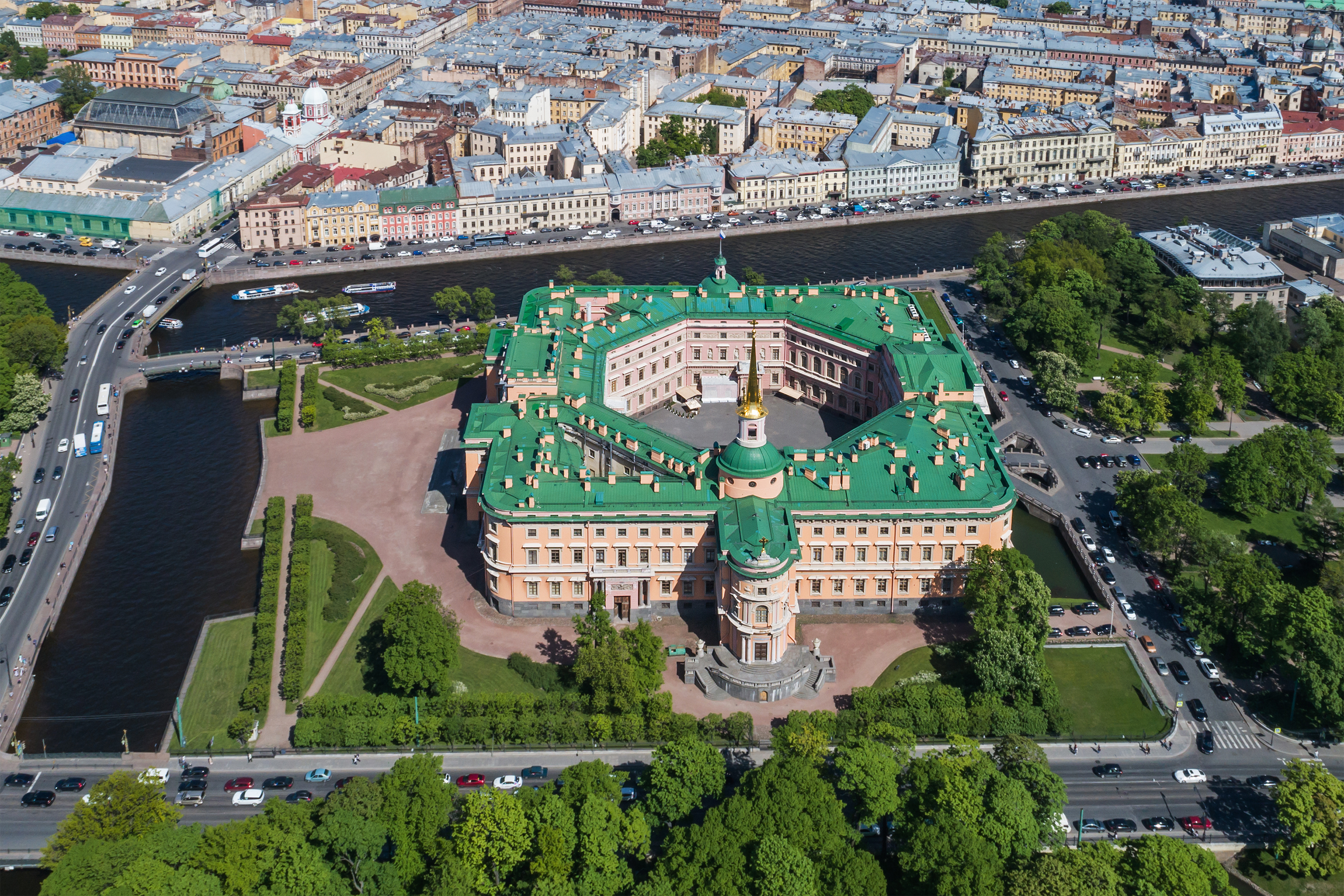
St. Michael's Castle in Saint Petersburg, where Emperor Paul was murdered mere weeks after the opening festivities

Paul's premonitions of assassination were well-founded. His attempts to force the nobility to adopt a code of chivalry alienated many of his trusted advisors. The Emperor also discovered outrageous machinations and corruption in the Russian treasury. A conspiracy was organized some months before it was executed by Peter Ludwig von der Pahlen, Nikita Petrovich Panin and José de Ribas. The conspiracy was allegedly financed by Zubov's sister Olga Zherebtsova using funds she acquired from her lover, Charles Whitworth, 1st Earl Whitworth, then serving as the British ambassador to Russia.

The death of de Ribas in December 1800 delayed the assassination; but, on the night of 23 March [O.S. 11 March] 1801, a band of dismissed officers murdered Paul at the newly completed palace of Saint Michael's Castle. The assassins included General Levin August, Count von Bennigsen, a Hanoverian in the Russian service; and General Vladimir Mikhailovich Yashvil, a Georgian. They charged into Paul's bedroom, flushed with drink after dining together, and found the emperor hiding behind some drapes in the corner. The conspirators pulled him out, forced him to the table, and tried to compel him to sign his abdication. Paul offered some resistance, and Nikolay Zubov struck him with a sword, after which the assassins strangled and trampled him to death. Paul's successor on the Russian throne, his 23-year-old son Alexander, was actually in the palace at the time of the killing; he had "given his consent to the overthrow of Paul, but had not supposed that this would be carried out by means of assassination". Zubov announced his accession to the heir, accompanied by the admonition, "Time to grow up! Go and rule!" Alexander I did not punish the assassins, and the court physician, James Wylie, declared apoplexy the official cause of death.

== Legacy ==
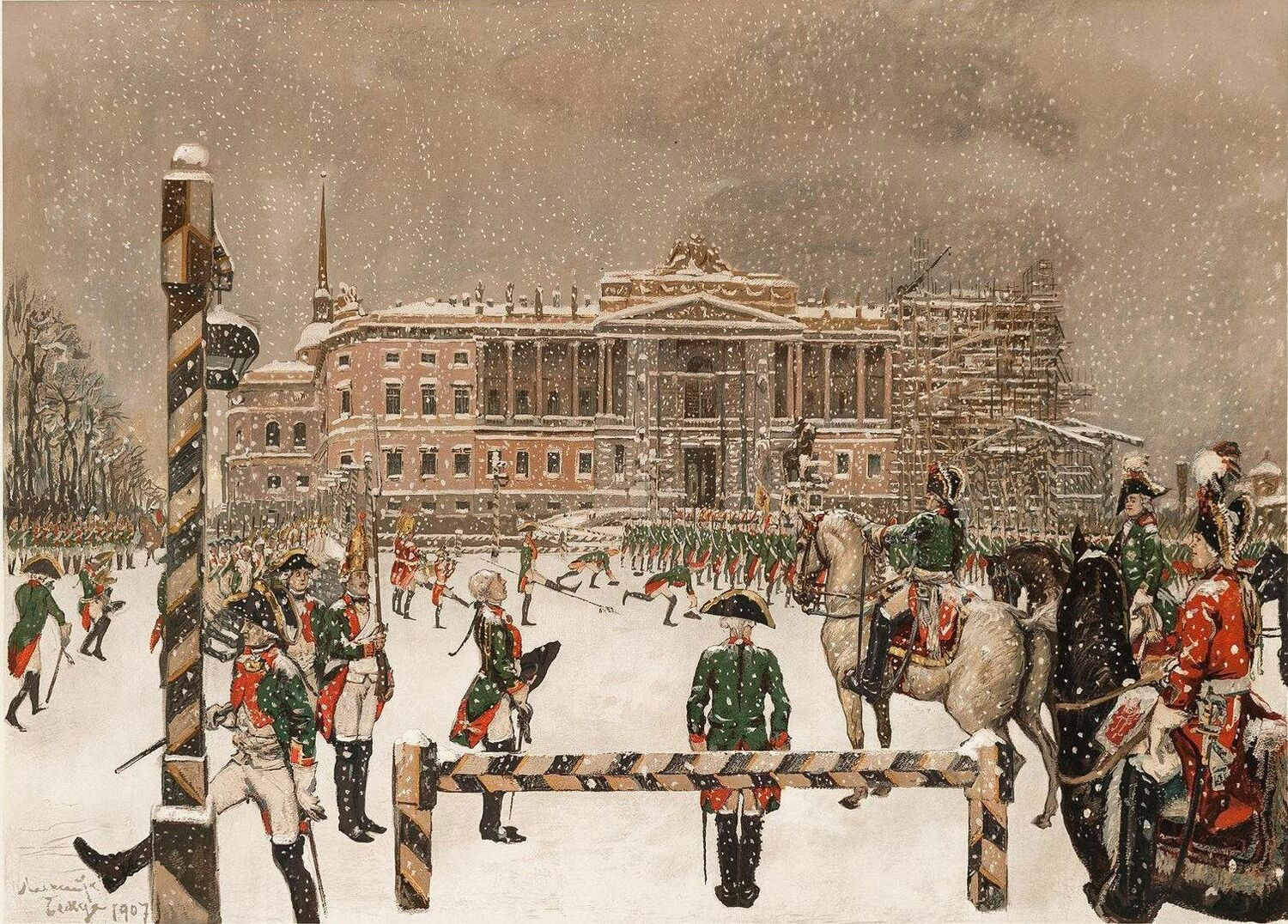
Military Parade of Emperor Paul in front of Mikhailovsky Castle painting by Alexandre Benois, taken from the art book Mir iskusstva

There is some evidence that Paul I was venerated as a saint among the Russian Orthodox populace, even though he was never officially canonized by any of the Orthodox Churches.

The city of Pavlograd (Pavlohrad) in Eastern Ukraine is claimed to have been named for Paul (the city was renamed from "Luhanske" in 1783), although the modern government have denied this, saying the name refers to Saint Paul.

=== Portrayals in popular culture ===
- In 1906, Dmitry Merezhkovsky published his tragedy Paul I; the most prominent performance of which was made on the Soviet Army Theatre's stage in 1989, with Oleg Borisov as Paul.
- The Patriot (1928 film), directed by Ernst Lubitsch, is a biopic starring Emil Jannings as Paul. It won the Best Writing Oscar at the 2nd Academy Awards. It is now mostly lost, with about one-third of the film preserved in archives.
- The Soviet film Lieutenant Kijé (1937), directed by Aleksandr Faintsimmer and based on a novella of the same name by Yury Tynyanov, satirizes Paul's obsession with rigid drill, instant obedience, and martinet discipline.
- In Sartre's novel Nausea (1938), Marquis de Rollebon, a fictional character being studied by the protagonist Antoine Roquentin, is implicit in Paul I's assassination.
- The Soviet experimental film Assa (1987) has a subplot revolving around Paul's murder; Paul is portrayed by Dmitry Dolinin.
- Poor Poor Paul (2003; Бе́дный бе́дный Па́вел) is a film about Paul's rule produced by Lenfilm, directed by Vitaliy Mel'nikov, and starring Viktor Sukhorukov as Paul and Oleg Yankovsky as Count Pahlen, who headed the conspiracy against him. The film portrays Paul more compassionately than the long-existing stories about him. The movie won the Michael Tariverdiev Prize for best music to a film at the Open Russian Film Festival Kinotavr, in 2003.
- The young Paul appears in the 2014 Russia-1 television series Ekaterina and features heavily as a main character in its second, third, and fourth seasons.
- The young Paul is portrayed by Joseph Quinn in the 2019 HBO mini-series Catherine the Great.
- An adult Paul is portrayed by Bruce Langley in the third season of the 2020 Hulu series The Great.

== Archives ==
Paul's letters to his first mother-in-law, Countess Palatine Caroline of Zweibrücken, (together with letters from his first wife to her mother) are preserved in the Hessian State Archive (Hessisches Staatsarchiv Darmstadt) in Darmstadt, Germany. In addition, Paul's letters to his first father-in-law, Louis IX, Landgrave of Hesse-Darmstadt, (together with letters from his first wife to her father) are also preserved in the Hessian State Archive in Darmstadt.

Paul's correspondence with his brother-in-law, King Frederick I of Württemberg (Maria Feodorovna's brother), written between 1776 and 1801, is preserved in the State Archive of Stuttgart (Hauptstaatsarchiv Stuttgart) in Stuttgart, Germany. Paul's correspondence with his parents-in-law, Frederick II Eugene, Duke of Württemberg, and Friederike of Brandenburg-Schwedt, written between 1776 and 1797, is also preserved in the State Archive of Stuttgart.

== Issue ==
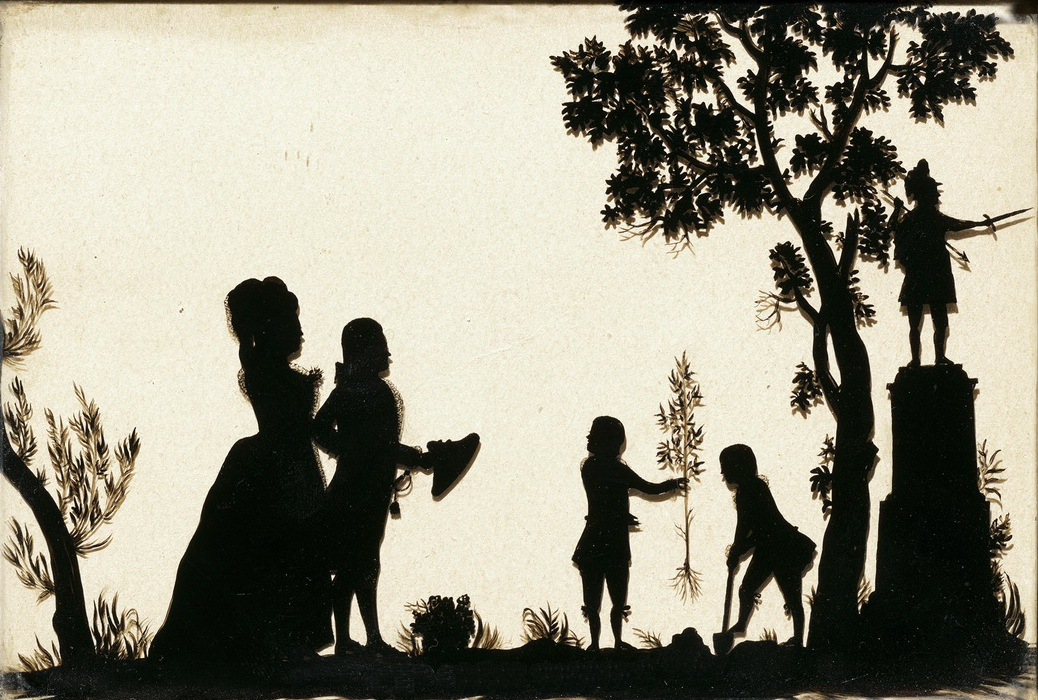
Paul and Maria Feodorovna with some of their children

Paul and Sophie had ten children; nine survived to adulthood (and from whom can be traced 30 legitimate grandchildren):

Name	Birth	Death	Notes
Alexander I, Emperor of Russia	12 December 1777	19 November 1825	m. Luise Auguste, Princess of Baden (Elizabeth Alexeiyevna) (1779–1826), and had two daughters (both died in childhood).
Grand Duke Constantine of Russia	27 April 1779	15 June 1831	m. first Juliane, Princess of Saxe-Coburg-Saalfeld (Anna Feodorovna) (divorced 1820); married second Countess Joanna Grudzińska morganatically. He had with Joanna one child, Charles (b. 1821) and 3 illegitimate children: Paul Alexandrov from first relationship; Constantine Constantinovich and Constance Constantinovna from second relationship.
Grand Duchess Alexandra Pavlovna	9 August 1783	16 March 1801	m. Joseph, Archduke of Austria, Count Palatine of Hungary (1776–1847), and had one daughter (both mother and infant died in childbirth). Formerly engaged with King Gustav IV of Sweden
Grand Duchess Elena Pavlovna	13 December 1784	24 September 1803	m. Friedrich Ludwig, Hereditary Grand Duke of Mecklenburg-Schwerin (1778–1819), and had two children.
Grand Duchess Maria Pavlovna	4 February 1786	23 June 1859	m. Karl Friedrich, Grand Duke of Saxe-Weimar-Eisenach (1783–1853), and had four children.
Grand Duchess Catherine Pavlovna	21 May 1788	9 January 1819	m. Georg, Duke of Oldenburg (1784–1812), had two sons; married Wilhelm I, King of Württemberg (1781–1864), and had two daughters.
Grand Duchess Olga Pavlovna	22 July 1792	26 January 1795	died age 2 years, 6 months from complications of a tooth abscess.
Grand Duchess Anna Pavlovna	7 January 1795	1 March 1865	m. Willem II, King of the Netherlands (1792–1849), and had five children.
Nicholas I, Emperor of Russia	25 June 1796	18 February 1855	m. Charlotte, Princess of Prussia (Alexandra Feodorovna) (1798–1860), and had seven children by her.
Grand Duke Michael Pavlovich	8 February 1798	9 September 1849	m. Charlotte, Princess of Württemberg (Elena Pavlovna) (1807–1873), and had five daughters.

=== Mistresses and illegitimate children ===
- Sophia Razumovskaya (1746–1803), lady in waiting of Catherine the Great.
  - Semyon Afanasyevich Velikiy (1772 – 13 August 1794)– became a naval officer and died in a shipwreck in the Caribbean.

== See also ==
- Manifesto of three-day corvee
- Tsars of Russia family tree

== Bibliography ==
- Alexander, John T. (1989). Catherine the Great: Life and Legend. Oxford University Press.
- Almedingen, E. M. (1959). So Dark a Stream: a Study of the Emperor Paul I of Russia, 1754-1801.
- Haukeil, Henry A.; Tyrrell, H. (1854). The History of Russia from the foundation of the Empire to the War with Turkey in 1877–78. Vol. 1. London: The London Printing and Publishing Company, Limited.
- Macek, Bernhard A. (2012). Haydn, Mozart und die Großfürstin: Eine Studie zur Uraufführung der "Russischen Quartette" op. 33 in den Kaiserappartements der Wiener Hofburg [Haydn, Mozart and the Grand Duchess: A study for the premiere of the "Russian Quartets" op. 33 in the imperial apartments of the Vienna Hofburg] (in German). Wien: Schloß Schönbrunn Kultur- und Betriebsges.m.b.H. ISBN 978-3-901568-72-5.
- de Madariaga, Isabel (1981). Russia in the Age of Catherine the Great. Yale U.P.
- Kamenskii, Aleksandr (1997). The Russian Empire in the Eighteenth Century: Searching for a Place in the World. pp. 265–280.
- Massie, Robert K. (2011). Catherine the Great: Portrait of a Woman. New York, NY: Random House.
- McGrew, Roderick E. (1979). "Paul I and the Knights of Malta". In Ragsdale, Hugh (ed.). Paul I: A Reassessment of His Life and Reign. Pittsburgh: University Center for International Studies, University of Pittsburgh. pp. 44 ff. ISBN 0-916002-28-4.
- McGrew, Roderick E. (1992). Paul I of Russia. Oxford: Clarendon Press. ISBN 0-19-822567-9. online review
- Alexander, J. T. (1993). "Review of Paul I of Russia 1754-1801, by R. E. McGrew". Russian History. 20 (1/4): 281–283. doi:10.1163/187633193X00243. JSTOR 24657306.
- Ragsdale, Hugh, ed. (1979). Paul I: A Reassessment of His Life and Reign. University of Pittsburgh: University Center for International Studies. ISBN 9780916002282.
- Sebag Montefiore, Simon (2016). The Romanovs: 1613—1918. Knopf Doubleday Publishing Group.
- Sorokin, Iurii Alekseevich (1996). "Emperor Paul I, 1796–1801". In Raleigh, Donald J. (ed.). The Emperors and Empresses of Russia: Rediscovering the Romanovs. Armonk, NY: M.E. Sharpe. ISBN 1-56324-759-3.
- Waliszewski, K. (1895). The Story of a Throne. London.

Emperor Paul I of Russia House of Holstein-Gottorp-Romanov Cadet branch of the House of Oldenburg Born: 1 October 1754 Died: 23 March 1801
Regnal titles
Preceded by Catherine II	Emperor of Russia; 6 November 1796 – 23 March 1801	Succeeded by Alexander I
German nobility
Preceded by Charles Peter Ulrich	Duke of Holstein-Gottorp; 17 July 1762 – 1 July 1773	Ceded to Denmark
Preceded by Christian	Count of Oldenburg; 1 July 1773 – 14 December 1773	Succeeded by Frederick August
Honorary titles
Preceded by Ferdinand von Hompesch zu Bolheim	Grand Master of the Knights Hospitaller; October 1798 – 23 March 1801	Succeeded by Nikolay Saltykov
