= Nikolay Alexandrovich Zubov =

Russian count (1763–1805)

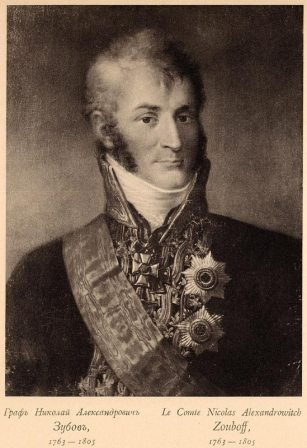

Count Nikolay Alexandrovich Zubov (Russian: Николай Александрович Зубов; 24 April 1763 – 9 August 1805) was the eldest of the Zubov brothers who, together with Count Pahlen, masterminded the conspiracy to assassinate Tsar Paul of Russia.

In 1782 Zubov joined the Horse Guards Regiment where he became known for his gigantic height, physical strength and fiery temper. When his younger brother Platon became Catherine II's lover, the "colossus" was made a count and general. He helped Alexander Suvorov fend off Prince Potemkin's intrigues, courted his only daughter, the Suvorochka (1775–1844), and eventually married her towards the end of 1794.

Although Catherine II's death spelled the end of his career, Nicholas mustered courage and rushed to the Gatchina Palace, where her son Paul was residing. He hoped to become the first to congratulate Paul on his prospective accession to the throne. On hearing the news of his arrival, Paul refused to see the courtier. He had heard the rumor that the Zubovs persuaded the Empress to sign a testament transferring the throne to her grandson Alexander and was afraid that Zubov had come to arrest him.

In short order, the Zubov brothers were exiled from court and little was heard about them until November 1800, when Nicholas was permitted to return to St. Petersburg. The connections of his sister Olga Zherebtsova and the funds provided by her lover Lord Whitworth allowed him and Count Pahlen to form a conspiracy. On the night of 11 March 1801 the plotters broke into Paul's bedroom in Saint Michael's Castle, and Zubov struck the emperor down with a heavy snuffbox, whereupon the emperor was strangled by his accomplices.

Zubov died four years after the regicide. Among his descendants was Count Valentin Platonovich Zubov (1884–1969) who founded the Gatchina museum and authored several books about Tsar Paul and his reign.
