= Platon Zubov =

Russian aristocrat, favorite of Catherine II

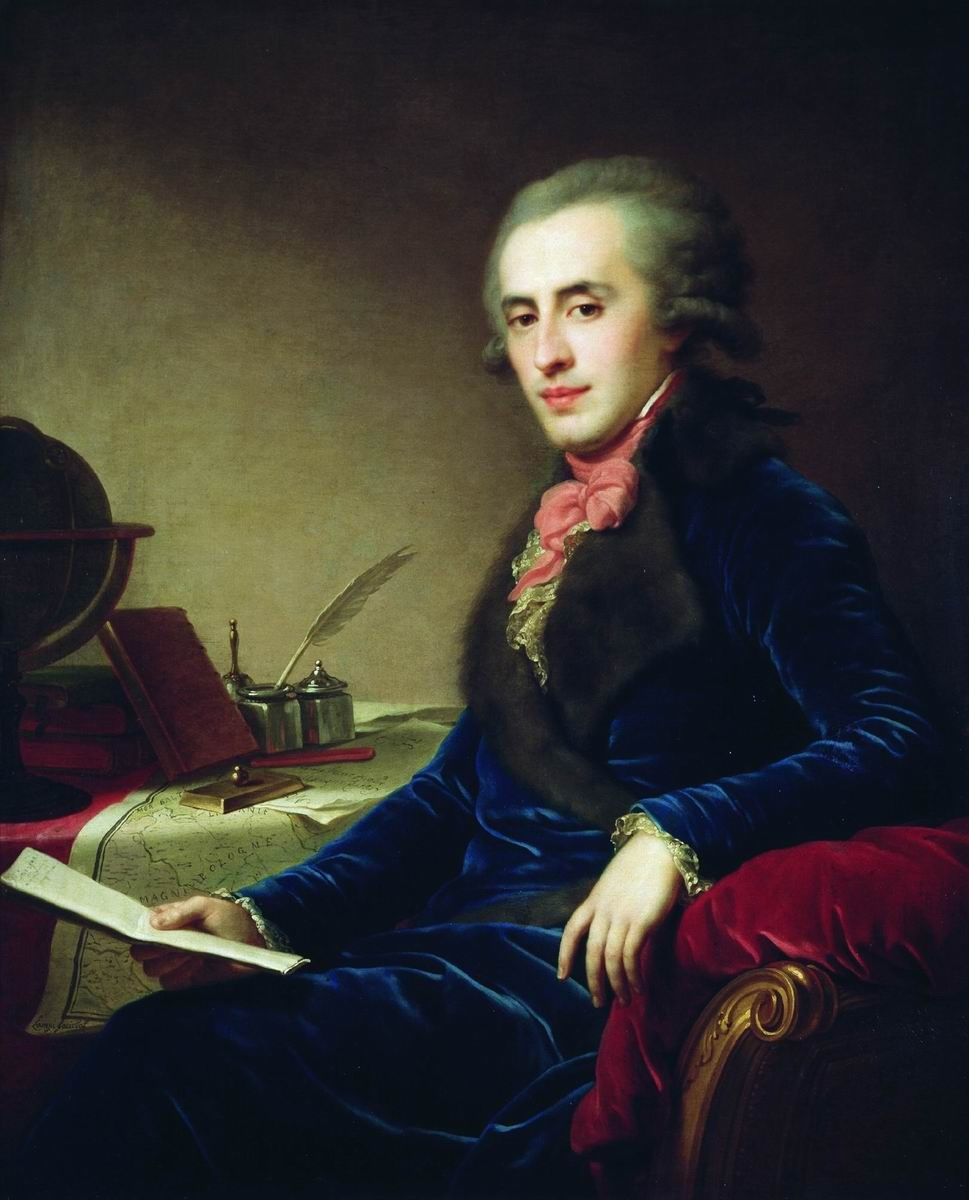
Portrait of Zubov, by Johann Baptist von Lampi the Elder, 1793

Prince Platon Alexandrovich Zubov (Russian: Платон Александрович Зубов; 26 November [O.S. 15 November] 1767 – 19 April [O.S. 7 April] 1822) was the last of Catherine the Great's favourites and the most powerful man in the Russian Empire during the last years of her reign.

== Early life ==
The prince was a member of the Zubov Russian noble family and had several siblings, including Nikolay, Valerian, and Olga Zherebtsova. It was through his distant relative, Russian Field Marshal Nicholas Saltykov, that he met the Empress. Saltykov presented the young officer at court on the understanding that Zubov would then help Saltykov in his feud with Catherine's long-standing favourite, Prince Potemkin.

=== Favourite of Catherine II ===
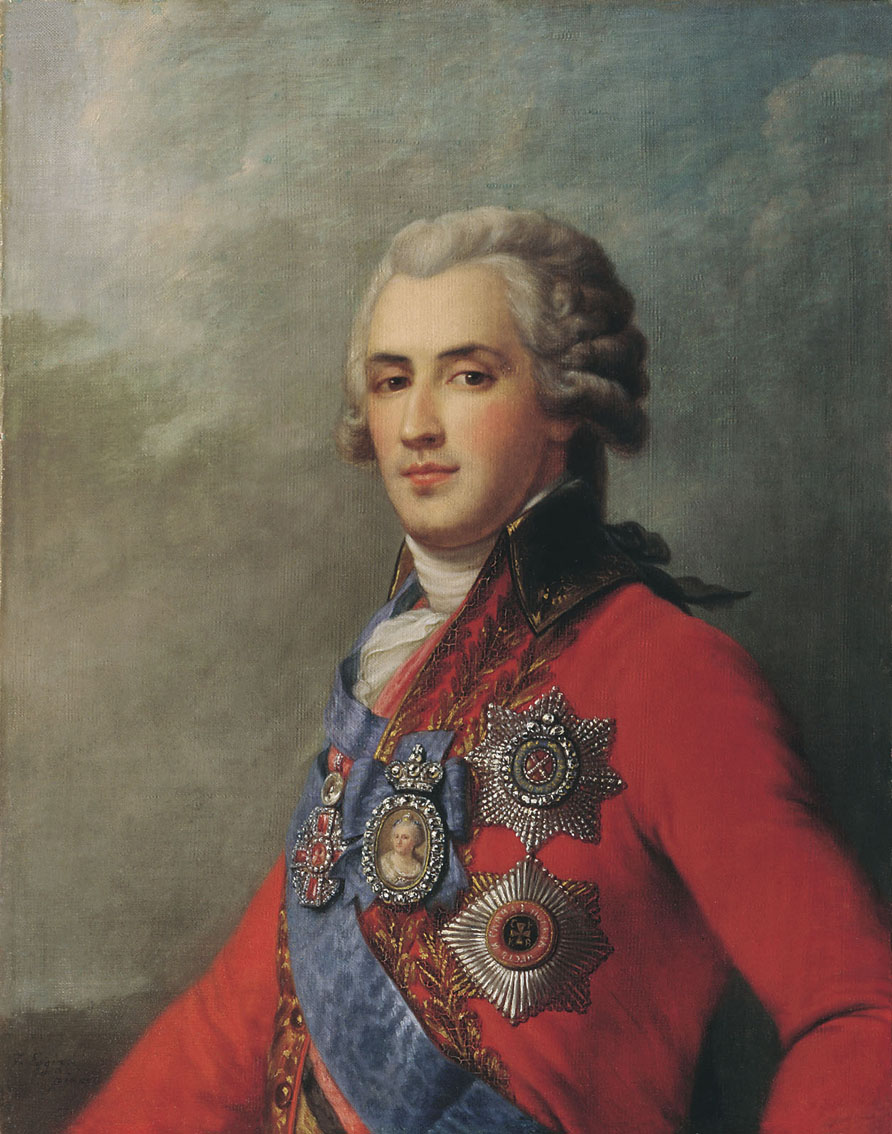
Portrait of Zubov by Johann Lebrecht Eggink

In August 1789, Catherine wrote to Potemkin that she returned to life after a long winter slumber "as a fly does". "Now I am well and gay again," she added, telling about her new friend, "a dark, little one". "Our baby," as she called him, "weeps when denied the entry into my room," Catherine informed Potemkin in the next letter. As young minions succeeded each other monthly in Catherine's heart, Potemkin did not attach importance to her new liaison. Catherine was over 60, Zubov was just 22. The old courtier did not believe that the connection would last for an extended period of time.

Zubov, however, managed to establish a stronghold of Catherine's affections and character. In 7 years, he was made a Count and then a Reichsfürst, or Prince of the Holy Roman Empire, becoming the fourth (and last) Russian to receive the title. Upon Potemkin's death, Zubov succeeded him as the Governor-General of New Russia (Yekaterinoslav Viceroyalty). As Fyodor Rostopchin reported to Semyon Vorontsov on August 20, 1795, "Count Zubov is everything here. There is no other will but his. His power is greater than that of Potemkin. He is as reckless and incapable as before, although the Empress keeps repeating that he is the greatest genius the history of Russia has known".

During his years in power, Zubov amassed an enormous fortune. The Empress conferred on him tens of thousands of serfs, while simultaneously the courtiers rivaled each other in lavishing presents on him. In the last year of Catherine's reign even most trivial matters came to be decided on Zubov's advice. Crowds of petitioners thronged in his bedroom every morning, trying desperately to attract the attention of his pet monkey if not himself. The old generals prepared coffee for him. Zubov's secretaries enriched themselves on bribes from petitioners. One of them, the Spaniard Jose de Ribas, is remembered as the founder of Odessa (which was founded on the exact location of the Ottoman settlement Khadjibey, being itself a successor to the much older Ancient Greek settlement).

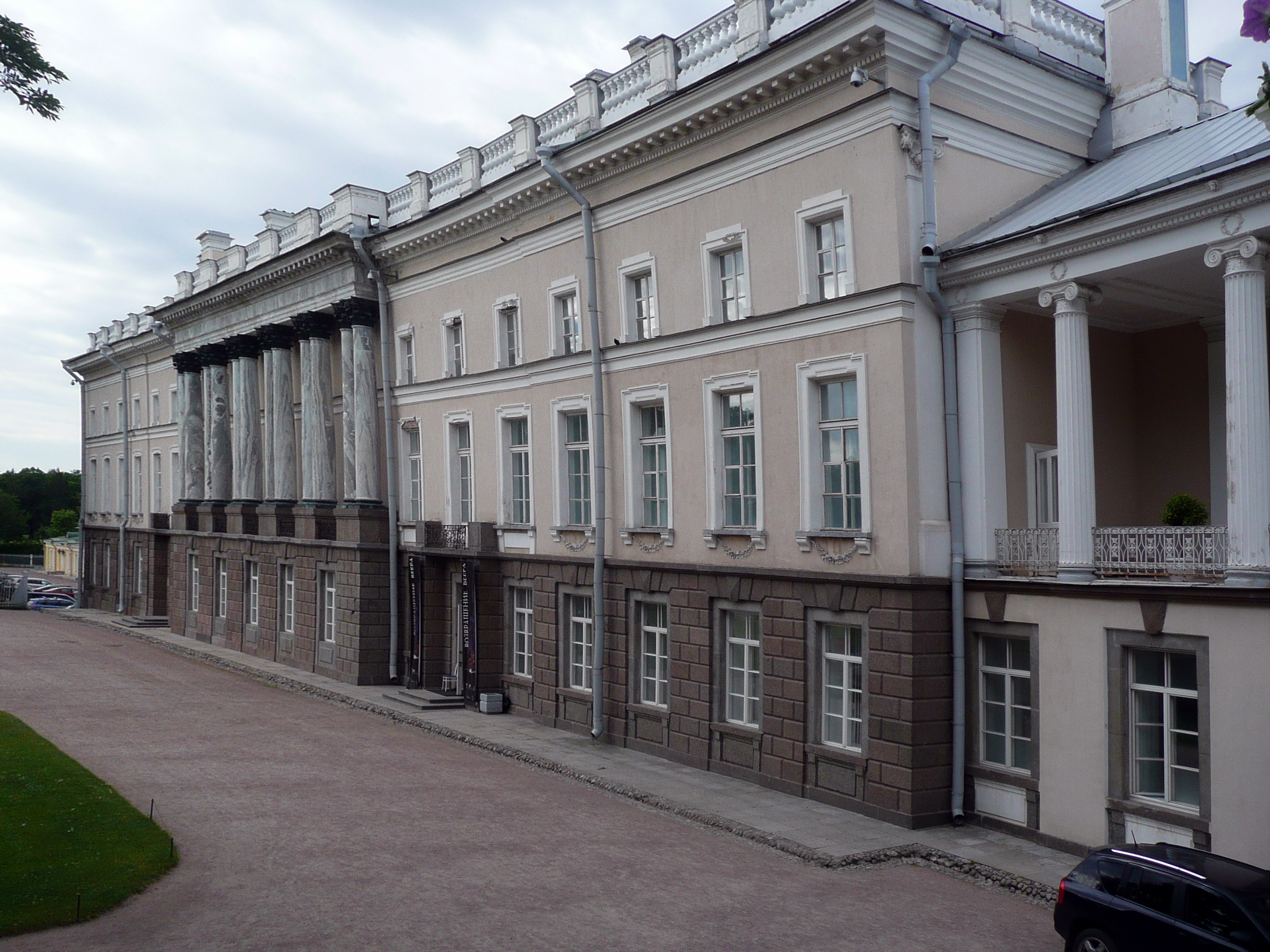
Zubov's apartments in Tsarskoe Selo stand next door to the Catherine Palace of the Empress.

Zubov's character was capricious and unstable. He patronized Suvorov and Denis Fonvizin, and yet he is thought to have instigated the persecution of Alexander Radishchev and Nikolay Novikov. To the heir apparent, Tsarevich Paul, he paid no respect. Unsurprisingly, Catherine's death all but brought him to the verge of madness. For ten days, he concealed himself in the house of his sister Olga. On the 11th day, he was visited by Emperor Paul who drank to his health and wished him "as many years of prosperity as there are drops in this beaker". Nevertheless, he was stripped of his estates, relieved of all his posts and was strongly advised to go abroad.

== Later life ==
During Paul's reign, Zubov travelled in Europe, where he was exhibited as a curiosity. In Teplitz, he fell in love with Countess de la Roche-Aymon, and subsequently proposed to the Princess of Courland, but was refused. Following an obscure duel in which he refused to take part, and which resulted in his aide's killing of the Chevalier de Saxe—son of Prince Francis Xavier of Saxony and cousin of Louis XVI—Zubov withdrew to his Rastrelliesque Rundale Palace in Courland, formerly the seat of the House of Biron. He ended his days living in seclusion. His young widow, Thekla Walentinowicz (1801–1873), a daughter of a local landowner, married Count Andrei Shuvalov (1802–1873), thus bringing the vast Zubov estates into the Shuvalov family.
