= Adyghe Khabze =

Moral code of the Circassian people

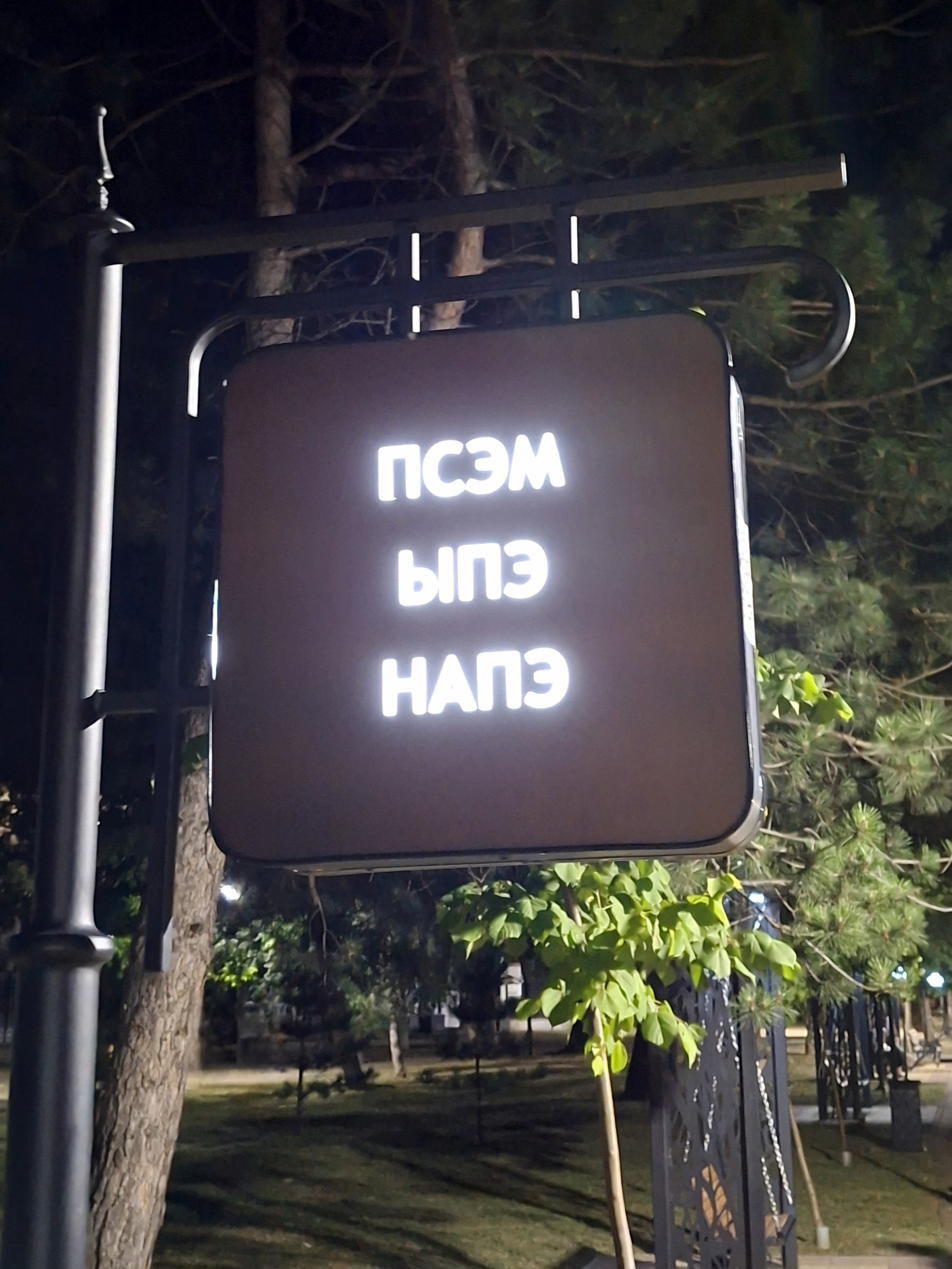
"Honour comes before life" , a Khabze reminder on a street sign in the Adyghe language. Located in Maykop, Republic of Adygea; similar signs with Khabze principles and folk wisdom can be found all over the republic.

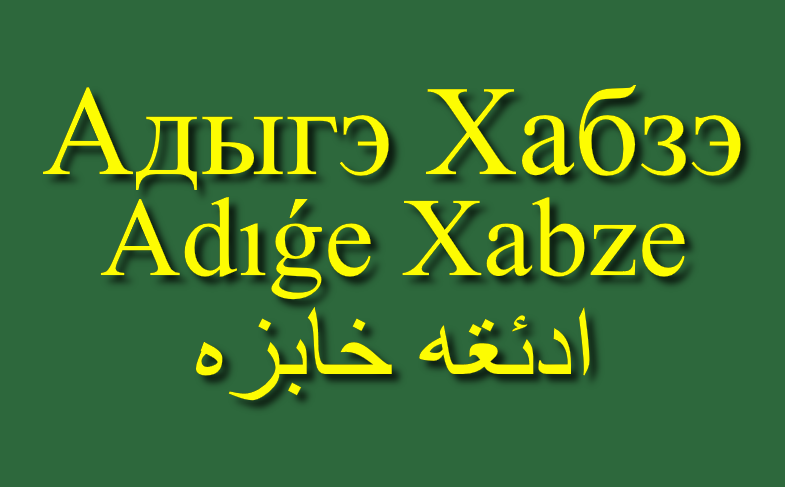
"Adyghe Khabze" in the Adyghe language, written in three scripts: the official Cyrillic, the unofficial Latin, and the historic Perso-Arabic.

The Adyghe Khabze (Note: Adyghe: Адыгэ Хабзэ, Kabardian: Адыгэ Хабзэ, pronounced [aːdɘɣə́ xaːbzə́], literally "Circassian Law" or "Circassian Etiquette"; alternatively spelled Xabze, Khabza, or Habze) is the traditional worldview and moral code of the Circassian people. It regulates most aspects of individual as well as social life, and has historically served as the unwritten constitution of Circassia, regulating legal proceedings, conflict resolution, military affairs, and governance. Khabze regulates, among other things, etiquette, age relations and gender relations, while emphasising respect, truthfulness, honour, and bravery. The historical and geographic conditions of the Circassians, specifically a constant state of war, led to the disciplinization and militarization of their daily life; many Khabze rules aimed to ensure respect for superiors and military readiness. It has historically been flexible, maintaining core principles while allowing specific rules to adapt over time.

In the 21st century, the demands of urban life, economic pressures, assimilation and globalization have necessitated the simplification of many Khabze practices, preserving the spirit of the law. Circassian terminology reflects this by distinguishing between Old Khabze (Adyghe: Хабзэжъ) and New Khabze (Adyghe: Хабзэкӏэ). Today, adherence to Khabze is primarily observed through specific practices, including general etiquette, Khabze gatherings, special respect for elders and opposite gender, wedding ceremonies, seating arrangements during gatherings, and funeral conduct. Adyghe Khabze is intrinsically linked to the concept of Adyghaghe (Adyghe: Адыгагъэ), which roughly translates to "Circassianity". Adyghaghe was the goal of an individual, while Khabze was the method to reach it.

== Etymology ==
The term Khabze literally means "law" and is derived from two Adyghe root words: kha (хэ), meaning "society," "public," or "human mass," and bze (Adyghe: бзэ), meaning "language," "mechanism," or "code". Thus, it literally translates to the "language of society" or the universal mechanism for reproducing social relations. In esoteric and spiritual interpretations, the components of the word are sometimes interpreted in a way where sounds had corresponding numbers, and Khabze literally meant "language of 7". The number 7 was considered to have spiritual meaning.

== Khabze laws ==
Adyghe Khabze operates on the foundational principle that "the individual is for the society". A person's behavior is not viewed in isolation; an individual acts as a representative of their family and lineage in almost every social setting. The value given to an individual by the community is directly dependent on their compliance with the Khabze. Historically, Adyghe Khabze encompassed three types of social norms:

1. Everyday norms (Etiquette): rules of politeness, good manners, and respectful interaction;
2. Ceremonial norms: Traditions surrounding life events such as weddings, funerals, childbirth, and formalized feasts;
3. Legal norms (Juridical): Laws governing land use, class relations, military duties, inheritance, and criminal liability. These were enforced by ad hoc courts and councils (khasé).

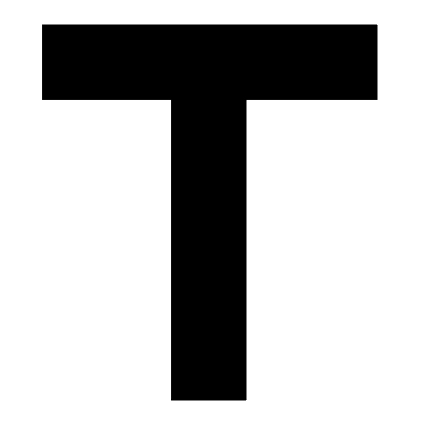
The Circassian "hammer cross" is a symbol of Khabze.

Every Circassian is expected to follow Khabze, regardless of social standing. According to Khabze teachings, Circassian princes were not supposed to wield despotic power, as they were not permitted to make decisions that bypassed the Khabze. True legal authority ("khabzerat" Adyghe: хабзэрат) were supposed to belong only to the decisions made by the people and their appointed elders and leaders ("thamaté" Adyghe: тхьэматэ). The social ideal of the Circassian peasantry was the preservation of communal solidarity. The concept of Psapé (Adyghe: Псапэ) strictly requires that acts of charity and helping others be done without expecting gratitude or rewards. Defense of the homeland, protection of the weak from the strong, hospitality, respect for women, and loyalty in friendship and to one's given word were among some teachings of Khabze. Failing in critical communal duties such as neglecting to help extinguish a fire or refusing to attend a funeral was considered to curse the family of the offender.

=== Etiquette and "Circassianity" ===
Social behavior follows strict rules of respect. Within Khabze, speaking clearly and using kind words are considered signs of high character, while excessive talking or too much sarcasm are discouraged. Custom dictates that individuals stand up when a guest or elder enters a room. To say hello, people move their right hand toward their head as a sign of respect. Khabze dictates that nobility refrain from using profanity. Furthermore, boasting about personal bravery or success is stigmatized. There are strict rules regarding names in public: it was considered rude for a husband to say his wife's name or for a wife to say her husband's name in front of others. Due to globalization, many of these rules were amended or abolished.

==== Adyghaghe ====
Adyghe Khabze is intrinsically linked to the concept of Adyghaghe (Adyghe: Адыгагъэ), which roughly translates to "Circassianity". One achieves Adyghaghe by living according to Khabze. Within this framework, Adyghaghe is viewed as the primary ideological foundation and the highest moral ideal. Thus, Adyghaghe is the internal moral requirement, Adyghe Khabze is the concrete form of expression of these ideals. Adyghaghe is divided into five pillars: Humanity (Tsifighé - Adyghe: ЦIыфыгъэ), Dignity (Namis - Adyghe: Намыс), Reason (Aqil - Adyghe: Акъыл), Courage (Tlighé - Adyghe: ЛIыгъэ), and Honor (Napé - Adyghe: Напэ). A Circassian proverb says that "if Adyghaghe disappears, the Circassians will disappear" (Adyghe: Адыгагъэр кӏуодмэ лъэпкъри мэкIоды).

==== Directional honor ====
Adyghe Khabze features a system of proxemics (spatial behavior) that governs how individuals position themselves. The direction of the mountains, generally south, is considered the honorable direction, while the opposite direction, north, is less honorable. A person approaching from the southern direction is generally greeted first, as the direction itself commands respect. The right side is universally considered the more honorable side. When two men walk together, the younger one walks on the left of the elder; however, if a man and a woman walk together, the woman is always placed on the honorable right side. Inside a room, the most honorable place is the seat furthest from the door. This seat is strictly reserved for the eldest or most respected person, while the youth sit near the door or the hearth. It was considered disrespectful to hand or pass anything to an elder using the left hand.

==== Age relations ====
Age strictly dictates hierarchical etiquette, irrespective of a person's social class. Younger individuals must explicitly obey their elders and are expected to provide them with services. A younger person must stand when an elder enters, cannot sit without permission, and must not interrupt or speak until the elder initiates the conversation. Furthermore, younger people are taught to accept criticism from an elder calmly, even if perceived as unfair, and must take a few steps backward when leaving an elder's presence to avoid turning their back on them. A son does not speak directly to his father when strangers are present. He must provide short, quiet, and clear answers to any questions. Spatial positioning also reflects this hierarchy; when walking, the elder must be positioned on the right, or in the middle if there are three people.

===== Thamaté =====
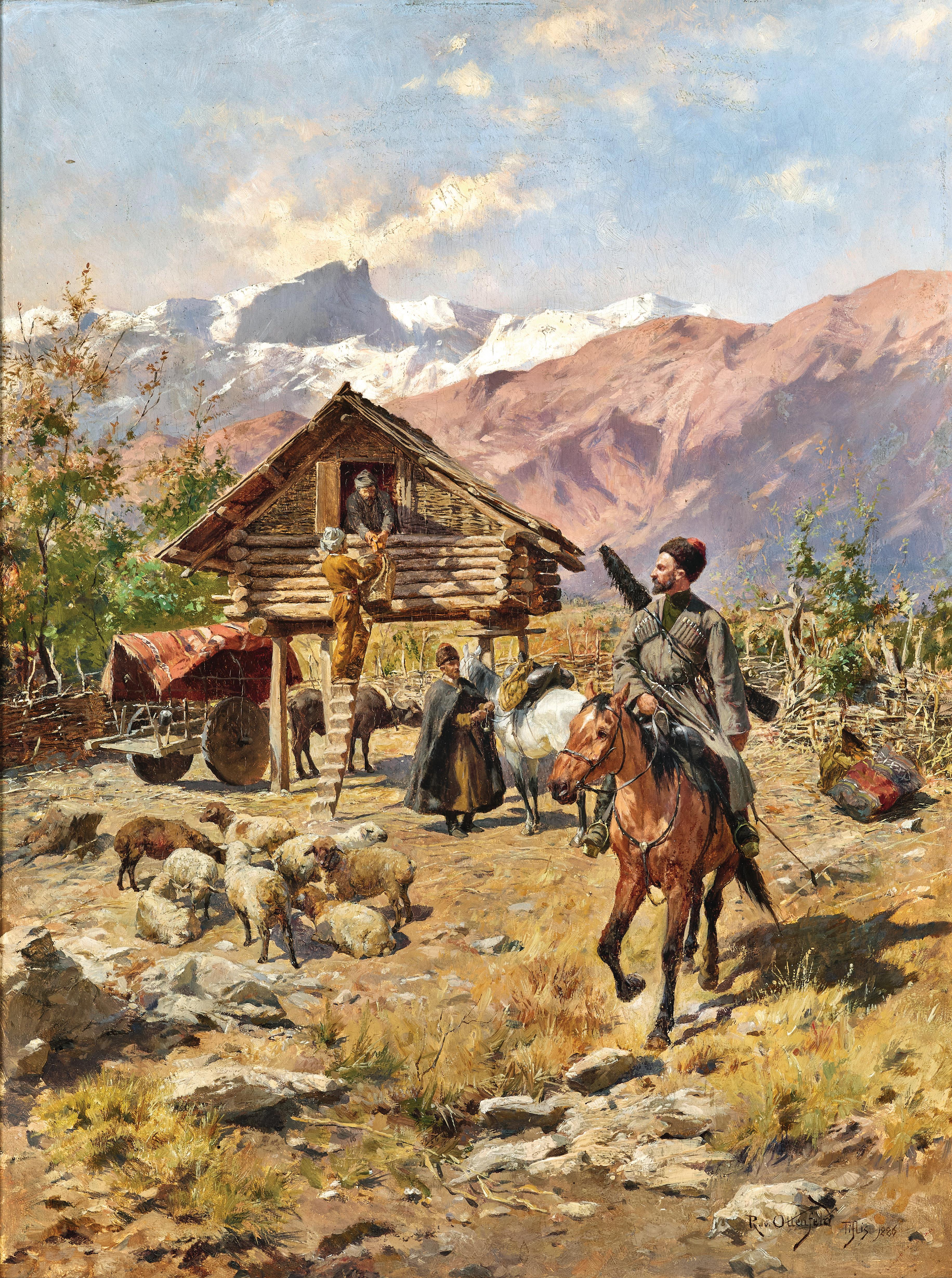
"A village in the Caucasus" by Rudolf Otto von Ottenfeld

At the center of this generational system is the thamaté (elder or leader). A 'thamaté' ([tħəmaːtə́]) is an elder or leader selected by the community based on their knowledge and reputation to manage a specific group, event, or community. While absolute respect is owed to all elderly individuals, obedience and societal management are specifically directed by the active thamaté. Every gathering or society has a thamaté, the oldest or most qualified person in that gathering, and the word can also be a generic term for "leader" or "boss".

====== Yefendi (ефэнды) ======
The village elder was the executive head of the village, elected by the assembly for a set term (often three years). The village elder was responsible for maintaining public order and managing village funds. Upon taking office, they swore an oath on the Quran to serve the community without bias or prejudice. A village elder who ruled arbitrarily, abused their power, or disrespected the community could face severe pushback, official complaints, and ultimately dismissal by the assembly. A special type of elder, the chief religious scholar of the village, the yefendi or effendi (Adyghe: ефэнды), was elected by the community, usually for a term of one year, and was required to demonstrate a strong knowledge of Khabze, the Quran, and the Arabic language. The yefendi managed the local sharia court, which handled family disputes, minor civil matters, and oversaw the moral and religious conduct of the villagers. The chief yefendi served as the head of education in the country.

==== Gender relations ====
Gender relations within Khabze are also highly structured. Men were assigned primary responsibility for the family's welfare and were required to maintain a respectful demeanor toward women. Etiquette demands that men stand when a woman approaches and remain standing until she passes, and give her the right of way. Men are forbidden from using coarse language in the presence of women, children, or even their peers. If a man is riding a horse, he is required to dismount and stand respectfully aside until a woman has passed. While interactions between men and women were highly regulated, women held specific customary rights and authorities. Notably, they possessed the unique power to halt bloodshed; a woman dropping her handkerchief between warring parties or stepping between them could enforce an immediate cessation of hostilities. Any person pursued by an enemy was granted absolute protection and could not be attacked if they sought refuge in the company of women.

===== Premarital relations and flirting =====
Interaction between sexes is highly regulated by Khabze, often occurring during formal dance parties (djegu - Adyghe: джэгу) where young men and women could appraise one another. Chastity before marriage was an absolute requirement. If a man and a woman engaged in consensual premarital sex, the solution was for involved parties to marry. However, if the man refused or was unable to marry the girl, he was deemed guilty of unlawfully seducing her, and would in most cases be executed. As for the woman, Khabze treated the event as a misfortune for the woman rather than a criminal offense. The blame for premarital sex was assigned entirely to the man: a man accused of this act lost all rights to hospitality and received no mercy from the local population. To escape retribution, he often had to abandon his village and flee to a distant tribe to avoid being killed. In some cases, fathers killed their own sons for the crime of seducing or inappropriate flirting. If the participants were married to other people, the act was categorized as adultery. In these situations, the male participant was executed without question, while the woman's punishment depended on her husband.

While physical intimacy before marriage was forbidden, Khabze did permit social interaction between unmarried men and women. Friendship between unmarried men and women was not taboo, and even encouraged. Young single women were allowed to appear in male society with their faces uncovered and could participate in dances and social gatherings. During courtship, young people engaged in conversations and verbal exchanges, and even light flirting, but demonstrative displays of romantic feelings or physical touch were prohibited.

====== "Fiance" (къэшэн) ======
A qashen (Adyghe: къэшэн), or a "fiance", is a traditional form of pre-marital friendship, courtship, or flirtation between unmarried young men and women. The arrangement does not equate to an intimate relationship in the form of a western "boyfriend and girlfriend" dynamic. This system allows unmarried individuals to communicate and assess one another as potential spouses within the boundaries of Khabze. The system is flexible; an individual may have more than one qashen over time, and a woman is permitted to initiate the relationship by offering it to a man. It functions as a dialogue and evaluation period between the genders without obscene connotations. Couples in a qashen relationship do not meet secretly or alone; if they come together, a third person must always be present. While they converse and dance together at social gatherings, physical contact or acting overly familiar toward a qashen during a dance is prohibited.

In Circassian qashen "dating", interactions occurred during community dance festivals or in a designated space within the girl's home. A young man wishing to visit a girl at her house had to bring a male friend along. In turn, the girl received her suitors in the presence of a chaperone, typically a younger sister, a relative, or a female friend. The courtship process followed strict behavioral rules. Parents did not participate in these meetings and considered it impolite to enter the room while suitors were present. Through these structured visits, young people engaged in conversation to understand each other's characters, merits, and flaws before making a final marriage decision. Prolonged dating without a commitment was deemed improper. When a young man decided to propose, he was required to do so in front of a third party, usually the friend who accompanied him. According to custom, the girl had to ask for time to consider the proposal, even if she intended to accept it. If she decided to reject the suitor, the etiquette required her to do so indirectly. A common method of polite refusal was for the girl to claim she had already given her word to another person.

The meaning of the term qashen has undergone changes over time. While it originally referred specifically to a girl whom a boy dated with the clear intention of getting married, the strict definition has since broadened. In the Caucasus homeland, particularly within the Kuban-Zelenchuk dialects, the term exclusively means "bride". In the oral speech of the Uzun-Yayla diaspora community, the meaning of the word transformed to also apply to males, meaning "groom". Another related term for a suitor is psetluk (псэлъыхъу), which translates literally as "soul-searcher".

===== Marriage and wedding =====
Marriage ceremonies were complex, involving tests of equestrian skill, and the groom hiding from the main festivities out of modesty. Khabze forbids marriages between blood relatives and people of the same clan, enforcing exogamy up to the seventh generation to prevent incest. The concept of blood kinship did not differentiate between degrees of closeness or distance. Individuals who shared the same clan name, or whose mothers shared the same clan name, were considered cousins. Socially, the relationship between cousins, uncles, aunts, nieces, and nephews was treated the same as the relationship between brothers and sisters. Consequently, they could not marry each other, regardless of how distant the relation might be. Individuals who married from the same clan were killed or exiled. Historically, people who had married an exceptionally close relative, such as a cousin, were thrown in a pit and stoned to death. In contemporary Circassian societies, there is no death penalty, but relative marriages are strictly shunned.

However, Khabze simultaneously maintains ethnic endogamy (marrying within the Circassian nation only). Traditionally, courtship was initiated when a suitor dispatched representatives. When the family agreed, the man gave a gift called "yeuzh". The bride was not taken directly to the husband's house. She first stayed at the home of a respected friend or relative. During this time, the husband could only visit the bride after sunset and must leave before the sun rises. A close friend usually stays with him as a guard.

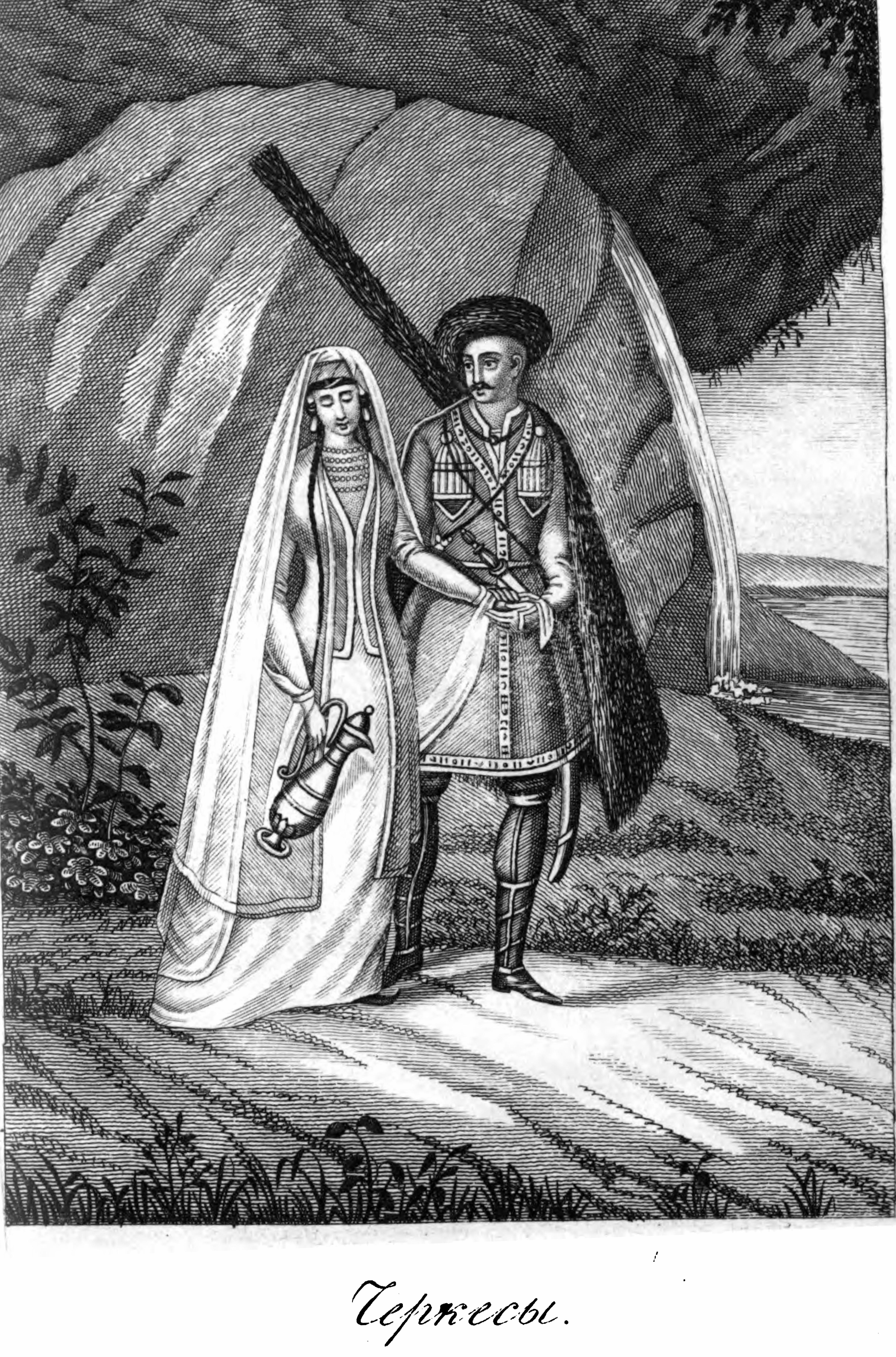
A Circassian couple by Nikolay Danilevsky

The bride's transition to the husband's home was traditionally accompanied by a large procession. Celebratory customs included singing and firing weapons into the air, and bystanders were expected to participate. Sometimes, people played jokes on travelers who did not join by knocking off their hats or making them get off their horses. At the husband's house, silk cloth was spread on the ground for the bride to walk on as she enters. People threw cookies or nuts over her for good luck. The wedding included many games, such as horse races or trying to grab a silk cloth from a moving cart. Men and women also performed a circle dance called "wuj" (Adyghe: удж). There were strict rules after the wedding. A husband did not say his wife's name in front of others. According to Khan Giray, in very rare cases, a father might arrange a marriage for his son to someone he has never seen before without asking for the young man's opinion.

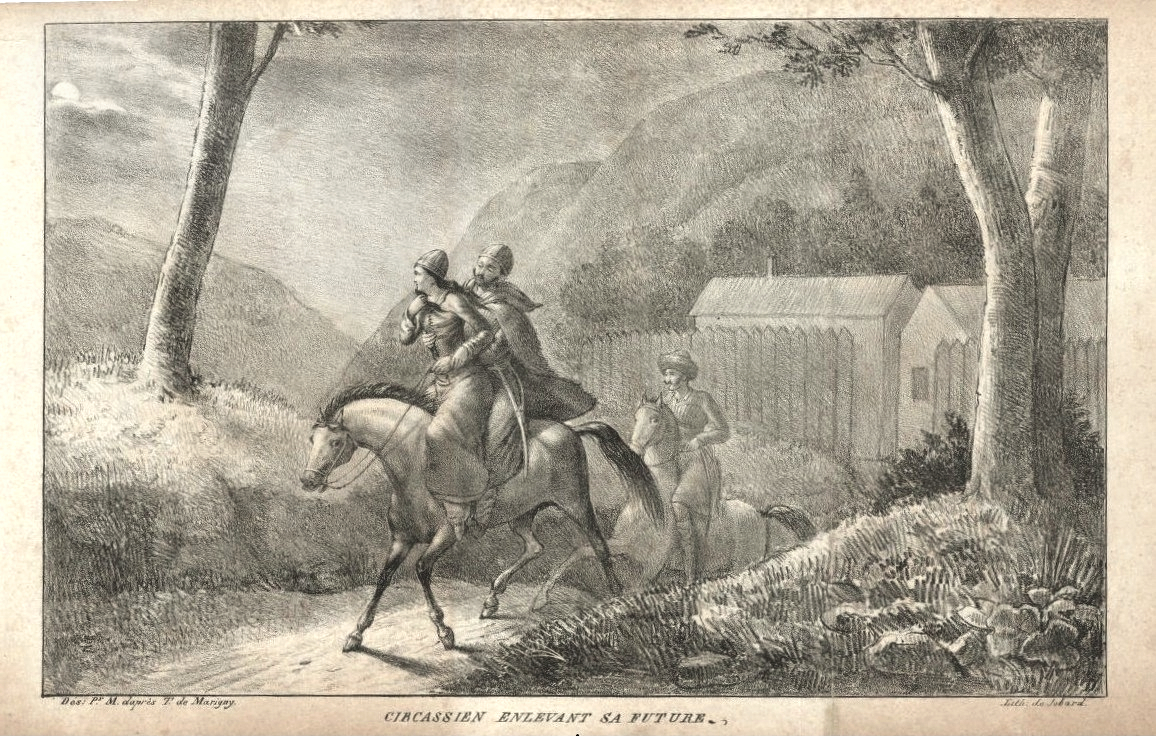
"Circassian Abducting His Future Wife" by Taitbout de Marigny

Although official weddings were preferred, in some cases marriages took place through elopement. Elopement was when a man took a woman to marry her secretly. It often happened if the woman's family did not agree to the marriage. Sometimes, families also used elopement to avoid the expensive, big and formal wedding. Taking a bride in this way was seen as a sign of bravery or a bold act. In many cases, these kidnappings were symbolic.

There were three main types of elopement. First, forced elopement, which happened against the will of both the girl and her family. Second, the elopement where the girl agrees, but her family does not. Third, there is "planned" elopement, where everyone agrees to pretend it is a kidnapping to save money on wedding costs.

Historically, elopement required a suitor to assemble a party of confidants to escort the bride to a designated safe house. The host of this house protected the girl until the marriage was official. If a man took a woman who was already married, the husband had the right to burn down the man's house as punishment. If disputes happened about elopement, they were usually settled by paying money as a penalty to the girl's family to keep the peace.

Although contemporary Circassian societies do not allow polygamy, historically, it was not prohibited. Khabze preferred monogamy, making the practice of taking multiple wives uncommon, but permitted. The practice of having multiple wives was nearly absent among the general population, and rare cases of polygamy were limited to exceptionally wealthy individuals or those who married widows to take care of them. Another case where a man could take a second wife is if the first wife is unable to bear children or if she cannot fulfill her duties due to severe illness. The first wife would often actively assist in finding a suitable second wife to take her place. This arrangement was considered a much more noble and dignified solution than divorce, which was heavily frowned upon and practically non-existent in traditional Circassian society. A man abandoning his wife without a universally accepted reason was seen as a deep disgrace, and he would face severe condemnation and potential retaliation from her family and the community. A man had to be able to provide and maintain a separate house for all of his wives. When a household included multiple wives, the oldest or first wife held seniority. Contemporary Circassian communities do not have polygamy. During the pre-Islamic period, keeping concubines was practiced among the Circassian nobility. However, as Islam became more established, the religion opposed these earlier customs, and Khabze shifted accordingly, classifying the keeping of concubines as an immoral practice and calling for strict punishments. By the 19th century, concubinage was not permitted.

==== Hospitality and protection ====
Hospitality is important in Khabze. Every home had a special guest room (hachésh - Adyghe: хьакӀэщ) that was always ready. The host was obligated to protect their guest from harm. If someone in danger asked a noble for help, that noble was obligated to provide safety and support. The guest house provided a sacred sanctuary; individuals fleeing blood feuds or seeking isolation from unjust offenses could claim absolute asylum there, and even sworn blood enemies were strictly forbidden from exhibiting hostility within its walls.

A guest (haché - Adyghe: хьакӀэ) was traditionally considered a "messenger from God". The host (bisim - Adyghe: бысым) is not only responsible for feeding and sheltering the guest but also acts as their absolute protector. At the table, the guest is always seated in the place of honor. A host was expected to serve a guest the best they can before asking who they are, where they come from, or why they arrived. An insult to a guest is treated as an insult to the host and their entire family. The host and the clan are expected to give their lives if necessary to protect the guest's safety and honor.

Adyghe Khabze also recognized special categories of guests:

- Guest with a request (hachéghuako - Adyghe: хьакӀэгъуакӀуо): Guests who arrived, often to a prince's home, specifically to ask for property or goods. It was considered a great disgrace to refuse them, and if the host lacked the means to fulfill the request, he might undertake a raid to enemy lines specifically to acquire the requested items while the guest waited in the guest house.
- Secret Guests: Individuals who arrived to plan a raid or retrieve stolen goods. Special hidden guest houses and stables were built deep in the woods to conceal their presence from the public eye.

A Circassian noble could travel to a friend-host (qunaq - Adyghe: къунакъ) in a neighboring region to retrieve his stolen goods, captives, or livestock, with the host actively assisting in the raids to satisfy his guest's needs.

===== Kodogh =====
Peasants had rights to own property and protection of their lives. A special person called a kodogh acted as a protector from the outside to make sure these rights were respected. If there was a fight between the nobles and the peasants, the kodogh acted as a middleman to solve the problem. The word "kodogh" has two meanings; a partner in destiny, or a person who makes sure rules are followed. If a lord violated Khabze and treated a peasant badly, the peasant could leave and go to their kodoghs. The kodoghs would protect the peasant and keep them safe, until the lord fixed the mistake or a deal could be reached. If a peasant stopped following the rules or did not obey the lord, the lord also has rights. The lord must tell the kodoghs about the situation. The kodoghs then looked at the rules to see who is right and make sure everyone follows the agreement.

==== Hygiene and haircut ====
Personal hygiene was regulated by customary practices in Circassian society. Individuals had to wash their faces each morning, washed their hands multiple times a day, and rinsed their mouths with water. Handwashing before meals was a mandatory practice; a host or servant provided a basin and a water pitcher to guests for this purpose. Hosts provided warm water to wash the feet of newly arrived guests. Women washed themselves and clothing in flat copper basins. When a guest uses a water pitcher to wash their hands, the host must offer the towel using their right hand. People had to wash their hands and feet multiple times a day using a copper pitcher and a basin. Newlyweds were expected to bathe every morning. Immediately after birth, newborns were taken to a river and bathed in the water, regardless of frost or cold weather. To harden their bodies, infants were also taken to a river to be bathed in cold water or rubbed with snow. In warm weather, young women sometimes bathed in the forest using spring water that flowed from a wooden trough, while others stood watch.

A rule dictated that the latrine must be built before the house. Estates maintained separate toilets for men and women, which were located far apart in secluded areas. There was also a guests' toilet. Latrines were round, woven structures with thatched roofs, plastered with clay, and positioned out of sight from the main house. Circumcision was a standard practice for children. Circumcision was typically done when a boy was three or four years old. During the procedure, the foreskin was pulled through a split stick and cut off with a razor or knife. Ash from burned cow dung was applied to stop the bleeding, and dried plantain leaves were placed on the wound to prevent infection. The procedure was carried out without any accompanying prayers or rituals. The ceremonies for circumcision were kept simple and were not flashy.

Rules regarding facial and body hair were specific. Men kept their mustaches long. Young men and active warriors generally shaved their beards or kept them closely trimmed, whereas older men allowed their beards to grow. A graying beard was viewed as an indicator of age, intelligence, and experience, which was a characteristic expected of a community leader or Thamaté. In later periods, these rules were updated by influence of Islam: a 1807 amendment to Khabze explicitly prohibited men from shaving their beards, in accordance with the sunnah of prophet Muhammad. During a child's first haircut ceremony, a respected member of the community would be chosen to perform the haircut. The designated person would give a speech wishing a healthy life, and then shaved the child's head in a set order: starting on the right side, moving to the front, then the back, and ending on the left side. After the haircut, the designated person prayed for a long life by saying "have such haircuts for a long time". The designated barber would be considered a foster relative of the child. Among Circassians in Turkey, there have been efforts to revive this tradition with modern haircut ceremonies performed by members of the Circasssian Council of Ankara.

Women were expected to grow their hair long. Girls wore their hair loose or in a single braid down the back. Upon marriage, women divided their hair into two braids and covered their heads with specific garments. Widows attached a small, round piece over their hair at the back of the head so they could be easily identified in the community. Forcibly cutting a woman's hair or braid was strictly banned. Khabze dictated specific penalties for anyone who forcibly cut a woman's braid.

Grooming for men was closely tied to martial customs. Warrior men shaved their heads, leaving a single tuft of hair at the crown known as an acha (Adyghe: акӏэ), yak'e, or khaydar. This tuft was grown around the age of 15 or 16 when a youth formally became a warrior. It served as a mandatory indicator of martial status and nobility, with wider tufts corresponding to higher social ranks. The purpose of this tuft was to allow an enemy to carry the severed head of a fallen warrior without getting blood on their hands. To maintain this haircut, men carried a razor and a whetstone. Older warriors who retired from combat shaved off this tuft in a ceremony called ak'e upsizh. Before combat, warriors removed their pubic and chest hair using razors, plucking, or a depilatory paste made of quicklime and arsenic. It was considered a disgrace for a man to be found dead on the battlefield with body hair in these areas. This practice was part of a broader set of rules regarding readiness for death, which also required warriors to go into battle wearing clean underwear so they would be properly prepared for the afterlife. Dying with unwashed clothes was considered a great source of shame.

=== Tribes and clans ===
Every Circassian belongs to a specific tribe, such as Bzhedug, Hatuqay or Kabardian, and has a clan/family name. A person's tribe points to the specific region of Circassia where their ancestors lived, rather than representing an entirely separate bloodline. The borders between these regions were flexible, and people moved between them. Because families moved and joined neighboring groups over time, the same clan can exist in multiple tribes. The clan unit is called a tlako (Adyghe: лIакъо). Marriage within the clan is forbidden. Lineage is tracked to prevent inbreeding: individuals have to memorize their ancestry back seven to nine generations. Traditionally, the clan name acts as a person's surname. Circassian naming conventions prioritize clan affiliation, requiring the family name to precede the given name. Many surnames are formed patronymically by adding the suffix -qo (meaning "son"). For instance, an individual named Muhammed from the Yinal family is called Yinaluqo Muhammed. Some clan names derive from a person's trade, such as "blacksmith" or "shoemaker". Other names originate from physical appearance or personality characteristics.

In 1934, the Turkish government passed a law requiring everyone to acquire a Turkish language surname, banning the use of minority language names. While most Turkish citizens did not previously use surnames, Circassians already possessed clan names, but the legislation banned minorities from using these ancestral names, meaning Circassians could not register their clan titles officially. Circassians either translated their clan names into Turkish, attempted to select similar-sounding words, or received completely unrelated surnames. Only Circassians living in the Hatay Province escaped this law and retained their original names, as the region was part of French Syria at the time. However, despite the lack of official recognition, many families continue to use their original clan names instead of their official surnames among themselves in daily life. Because Circassian custom strictly forbids marriage between individuals of the same lineage, retaining these original family names allows diaspora members to accurately identify their blood relatives and enforce the ongoing rules of exogamy, including when meeting other Circassians from different countries. Unlike the assimilation policies in Turkey that required citizens to adopt unrelated Turkish surnames, Circassians living in Russia and Arab nations retained their ancestral clan names as their official family names. When recorded in Russian records, suffixes like "-ov" or "-ev" are attached to the clan names.

==== Tamga (Тамыгъэ) ====
Examples of Circassian tamgas from the Abzakh tribe

Most Circassian families have a symbol known as a tamga. The rules for using a tamga are integrated directly into Khabze. Families created these signs themselves and passed them down to their descendants. The tamga consists of simple lines and hooks and functions as a family crest, property mark, and lineage symbol. Families used it primarily to brand livestock, such as horses and sheep. Fathers passed the tamga down to their sons, and Khabze strictly forbade anyone from forging or using another family's mark. The tamga had several uses beyond agriculture. A tamga was often used as a seal or signature on documents. Craftsmen stamped it on their products to show origin. It was used on coins and decrees. Families carved it on tombstones to identify the dead, and commanders drew it on military flags. Losing a flag that carried the family tamga was a source of shame. When a family grew, members could create new tamgas.

In the modern era, the tamga lost its practical use for branding livestock or sealing documents, but is preserved as a "Family Symbol" or family coat of arms. Tamgas are still used in arts and frequently incorporated into the geometric patterns of traditional multi-colored woven mats and prayer rugs. Families still engrave them on weapons and rings, and carve them into gravestones to clearly identify the burial sites of their relatives. In Turkey, since Circassians were forced to adopt Turkish language surnames as per the Surname law, they carved their tamgas into gravestones to preserve memory of their Circassian families.

==== Sworn brotherhoods (ЗэтхьарIогъу) ====
Sworn brotherhood (Adyghe: ЗэтхьарIогъу, lit. 'Mutual oath-ship') were a voluntary clan where people or families come together by choice. Its main goal was to protect members from outside pressure. When someone joined a brotherhood, they took a special oath to stay loyal and follow the rules. In return, the group gave the new member help and kept them safe. These groups would grow large and act like small republics. They had their own judges to solve problems between members. In some areas, there were dozens of these brotherhoods made of many different families.

=== Warrior tradition and chivalry ===
==== Militarization ====
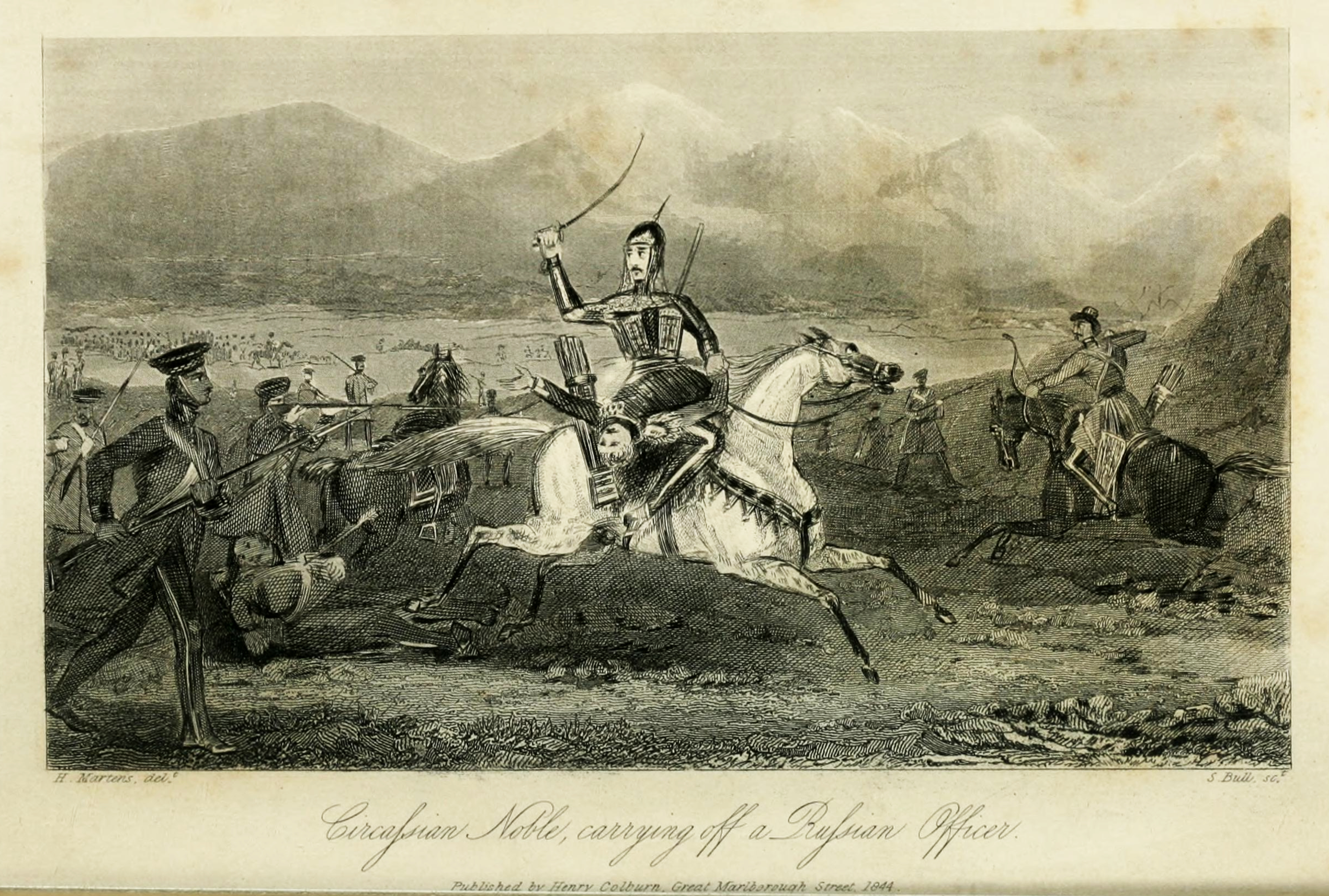
"Circassian Noble Carrying Off A Russian Officer"

The historical, geographic, and socio-economic conditions of the Circassian people, specifically a constant state of war, led to the extreme militarization of their daily life. Thus, many Khabze rules existed to ensure constant military readiness. During hostilities, it was considered unacceptable to set fire to homes or crops, especially bread. It was considered inadmissible to leave the bodies of dead comrades on the battlefield and considered a great disgrace to fall alive into the hands of the enemy. Worq Khabze (Adyghe: Оркъ Хабзэ) was the specific code of conduct for the Circassian nobility and knightly class. Guided by the motto "Honor and War" (Adyghe: Хабзэрэ Заорэ), a nobleman's life was seen as a continuous chain of battles destined to end in a heroic death. This martial code emphasized military prowess, emotional restraint, and riding skills. Over time, these chivalric standards permeated the lower classes, becoming a universally recognized part of the general Adyghe Khabze. A warrior's status was historically elevated by distributing battle spoils rather than hoarding them. Furthermore, the code demanded the suppression of visible pain when injured. When a warrior is injured, people sing and play games around them to keep their spirits high. The moral rules for warriors are based on ancient hero stories, Nart Sagas. These adventures of the Narts serve as a practical guide for how a person should live and behave with honor. The principle was "honor before life" (Adyghe: псэм ипэ напэ). This was reinforced by well-known proverbs such as "Sell your life, buy honor" (Adyghe: Псэр щэи, напэр къэщэф), reflecting that life held value only if dedicated to maintaining one's honor. It was considered a disgrace and a sign of cowardice to attack an unarmed person, to strike an opponent from behind, or to kill a sleeping enemy.

The carrying of traditional weapons (such as a dagger or revolver) was considered a vital attribute of a free man's honour and dignity, and attempts to disarm the population were historically met with deep resentment. Consequently, the carrying of weapons was customary for men. A man only took off his large knife, called a qama, when he removed his coat. Even while sleeping, he kept his knife under his pillow. Every person, from a shepherd to the highest of nobility, could and was expected to own a rifle and a sword.

Training for endurance begun in childhood. Warriors learned to handle extreme hunger, thirst, and very cold or hot weather. They were used to living outdoors and could swim across icy rivers in winter without stopping their journey. In the Atalyk (pur - Adyghe: пIур) system, noble or well-off families would send their children to be raised by experienced tutors. This training taught the child how to ride horses, use weapons, and speak politely as a part of Khabze.

Retreating or showing fear in battle was considered the greatest shame. Warriors were expected to mock dangerous situations by calmly bowing to or saluting enemy bullets and cannonballs that missed them. Famous warriors could be expected to casually walk their horses at a slow pace directly in front of enemy artillery and musket fire. When a bullet or cannonball would buzz past them, they would politely take off their hats and bow with "courteous irony" to the incoming fire. In some cases, living a long life was considered shameful for Circassian nobility. For instance, the motto of the Qanoqo dynasty who ruled the Besleney Principality was "We Qanoqos plan to live no more than twenty-five years"; the princes would traditionally have to plan to begin a life of deadly adventures at age 15 so they could guarantee they would die a warrior's death before hitting 26.

Before warriors departed for battle, special religious ceremonies were performed on them specifically so that bullets wouldn't strike them and snakes wouldn't bite them. Warriors were expected to be loyal to their brothers-in-arms and risk their lives to make sure a fallen comrade is not left behind on the battlefield. The horsemen could reload their rifles while riding at a fast pace. After a battle, poets would create songs to honour and remember the names of heroes, and being featured in a heroic song was considered a primary method for securing a lasting historical legacy. It was said that those who die righteously or fall in battle become martyrs (Adyghe: шэхьит) and continue to walk among the living invisibly.

==== Expedition culture (ЗекIо) ====
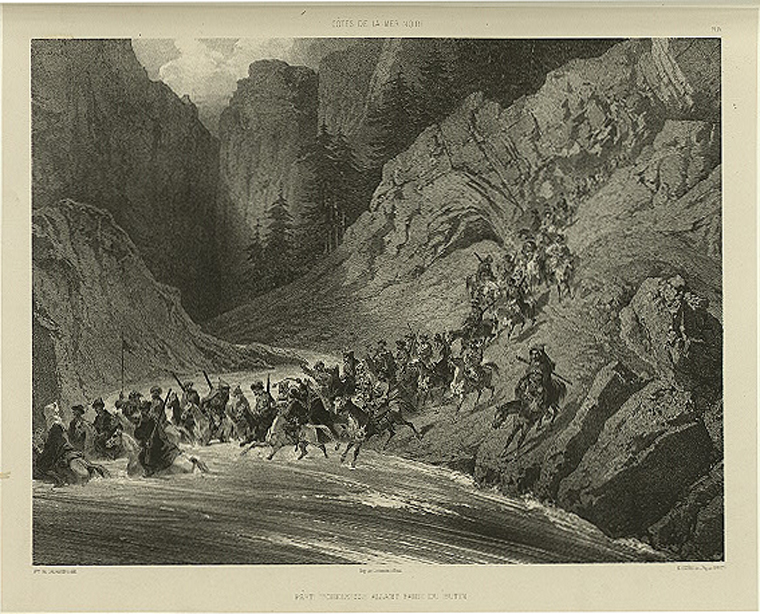
A raid campaign, Grigory Gagarin

Military raids, adventures and expeditions, known as zek'о (Adyghe: зекӏо), were one of the most significant institutions in feudal Circassia. Going on a military adventure was a primary means for a warrior to assert himself, prove his courage, and gain fame. The primary goal of going on a military expedition is to gain fame and honor rather than money. According to the chivalric code, knights were expected to participate in raids without requesting details. The knightly code had several principles, such as "a knight does not ask where he is being led" (Adyghe: Оркъ здащэ кӀэупчӀэрэп), or that "a knight does not reveal the secrets [of his comrades]" (Adyghe: Оркъ хащэрэп). During the pre-Islamic period, the Circassian pagan pantheon had a god of military raids, known as Zek'otha (Adyghe: ЗекIотхьэ).

Historically, warriors were expected to seek a heroic title throughout their lives. It was customary for a newly married man to join a raid to prove his bravery. The goods he wins are usually given away as gifts to guests or friends. Expeditions would mostly happen during the spring and autumn. Groups of young warriors gather in forests or temporary huts. During these campaigns, young fighters are encouraged to meet people from other Circassian tribes and make new friends in different lands. For the nobility, participating in campaigns was practically an absolute obligation; a young prince who stayed home for more than eight days risked losing his honor and respect. Bards (djeguako - Adyghe: джэгуакIо) celebrated these military feats in heroic songs.

The fighting style focused on speed and surprise attacks. They would make a false retreat to lead the enemy into a trap. They carried very little gear and could survive extreme cold or hunger. During night raids, warriors used the stars and nature to find their way. They followed the North Star and the Milky Way. Expert guides also looked at the wind, the way grass leans, or how snow melts on hills to choose the right path.

Rules for sharing goods won in battle are very strict. Respect for age is the most important rule. The oldest person in the group gets to choose their share first, even if they were just a cook. When they return home, warriors give gifts to the elders and women of the village. Loyalty to friends was considered a high duty. A group would risk everything to make sure a fallen friend's body is not left behind. In some cases, they even kill their own horses to build a "wall" and fight until the very end. Campaign songs would be used to keep the spirit of the warriors high during campaigns. Before a raid, they would invoke the names of their mythological ancestors (like the Narts) and pray for success. Poets wrote songs about every victory or loss.

==== Prisoners of War ====
Rules of captivity (Adyghe: гъэр) were also regulated by Khabze. Customs governing fellow Circassians taken during internal conflicts differed from the treatment of external enemies. A Circassian prisoner of war had a right to be treated according to Khabze, which restrained a Circassian from unjustly selling a compatriot into foreign slavery. Doing so triggered the rules of blood revenge (Adyghe: лӏыуасэ), exposing the captor to retaliation from the captive's clan identical to that inflicted on a murderer. Even ruling princes lacked the authority to sell bonded peasants, except in instances of treason or bad faith confirmed by a public assembly.

===== During the Russo-Circassian War =====
Relations with non-Circassian prisoners of war, primarily Russian or Cossack soldiers, were different. Such prisoners were put to manual labor (except for officiers and nobility), were not allowed to hold weapons, and were often used for financial ransom or conducting prisoner exchanges, although they were afforded some rights. Women held in captivity had the right to be guarded against abuse. In personal interaction, captors had to maintain customary norms of courtesy toward them, and they were allowed food identical to the captors' own, as well as seasonal clothing and medicine. However, these rules were not always followed and often left to the individual captor's leniency. If they could not be ransomed or exchanged, the captor could sell them as slaves in foreign markets. Russian captives were encouraged to convert to Islam. Those captives who converted to Islam or stayed in Circassia for a long time were allowed to integrate. Over decades, many captives became fully assimilated, adopted local customs, and refused offers of repatriation. They could be emancipated and formally adopted into a Circassian family and even marry locally as long as they adopted Circassian culture. Once this process was completed, the former captive was recognized as a legitimate son of the family, gained the full rights of native freemen, and fell under the collective protection and blood-defense obligations of the clan.

A clear distinction existed between captives taken by force and Russian soldiers who deserted voluntarily to the Circassians. Deserters who entered a Circassian settlement had to be treated accordign to the laws of hospitality. Since surrendering a guest to an adversary was an impermissible breach of honor, the deserters were employed as agricultural laborers or allowed to settle permanently. Soldiers in the Russian army of Polish or other origins who were captured by Circassians were to be incorporated into Circassian forces due to their knowledge of European military tactics.

==== Battlefield Suicide ====
Khabze strictly prohibited fleeing the battlefield or losing weapons, and while a tactical retreat during a battle was acceptable if the fighters regrouped, fleeing out of cowardice or yielding without a fight resulted in severe social condemnation and a loss of status. Being captured alive as a prisoner of war was considered an ultimate source of shame. While self-inflicted suicide was strictly prohibited, a Circassian was expected to fight and to try to die rather than be captured alive. When a warrior was cornered or faced an unwinnable situation, he resolved the dilemma between the prohibition of suicide and the shame of captivity by "forcing the enemy to kill him" while attempting to take down a few enemies in the process. If possible, warriors had to destroy their own weapons to prevent the enemy from capturing them, and then intentionally rush into enemy formations to ensure their own death. By attacking in this manner, they forced the enemy to deliver the lethal blow, dying in combat rather than by their own hand. Foreign observers in Circassia described this phenomenon as "symbolic suicide".

During the Russian-Circassian War, Russians also recorded instances of this phenomenon. When the Russian annexation of Circassia was coming to an end, some Circassians who refused to surrender, "women, men, children", engaged in so-called "suicide wars" to die. During this period, according to Russian reporters, the Caucasians commit suicide en masse to avoid capture, in the Sadz region, some villages lost all of their inhabitants. Colonel Kuzminski recorded a specific incident involving a captured family consisting of a husband, a wife, and their four-year-old child who were taken prisoner on August 22. The husband threw himself off a cliff over a river and died. The wife asked for permission to return home but was instead escorted under guard to the Lazarevsk outpost. Upon seeing the sea along the route, she pressed her child to her chest and threw herself off the cliff. The child was found dead, and the woman died two hours later after being carried to the fortification. Similar events also took place in water. Russian sources report Circassian warriors choosing to drown themselves rather than surrender to Russian forces during naval engagements or when cornered near the coast. In the spring of 1841 during a naval battle off the coast of Vordane, a Circassian vessel carrying 37 men, commanded by captain Tati Tatlestan engaged in a battle with Azov Cossacks; when the Cossacks boarded the vessel and gained the advantage in hand-to-hand combat, 23 of the surviving Circassian men threw themselves into the sea to drown rather than be captured, while others, including the captain, were found dead on the boat.

Taking one's own life outside of battle was considered a cowardly act and strictly prohibited. It was traditionally said that neither the Sky (Adyghe: Уашъо) nor the Earth (Adyghe: Чӏыгу) would accept the spirit of a suicide, condemning them to wander eternally. Thus, individuals who wanted to commit suicide such as those who suffered personal tragedies or those who sought a way out of personal shame, used symbolic suicide to end their lives. By throwing themselves into enemy infantry units, they achieved an acceptable death that successfully bypassed the cultural and religious bans on suicide.

===== Sacrifice Troops (Тылый) =====
During severe enemy attacks, a fighter could voluntarily "dedicate himself to death" and become a sacrifice to go on a mission. The volunteer, referred to as a "Tiley," (Adyghe: Тылый; Kabardian: Тылей) would undergo a ceremony overseen by community elders (thamate). He was dressed in red garments and equipped only with offensive weapons, such as a dagger, sword, and bow. He was given no defensive weapons, ensuring that he would not return alive. The primary military objective of the Tiley was the targeted assassination of key enemy figures. Instead of participating in general combat, the Tiley's goal was to infiltrate the enemy camp at night and kill a specific individual, usually the enemy commander or a designated warrior. To facilitate this, spies would secretly observe the enemy encampment to locate the specific tent where the target slept, and then point it out to the Tiley.

==== Duels (КIакIозэпыдзэ) ====
Spontaneous disputes over honour could erupt into duels. Duels almost exclusively took place on horseback, as fighting on foot was considered disgraceful for a knight. They would only dismount if their wounds made it impossible to stay in the saddle; in fact, the phrase "to dismount from a horse" in Circassian became a metaphor meaning "to die". A Circassian who was falsely accused of violating Khabze could seek to clear his name by arbitration of a court or challenging his accuser to a duel. When faced with an insult, the norm was to not insult back, but draw weapons immediately for a duel. Men who had been conversing amicably could draw their weapons and fight to the death on the spot.

Oaths were sworn by placing hands on the Qur'an. Thus, it was understood that breaking such an oath would be lying in the name of God. Calling someone a "liar in the name of God" or "rejector of God" was considered the biggest insult and was a call for instant duel. However, if the quarreling parties are guests, this quick temper was moderated by respect for the host of the house where the dispute occurred; out of deference, the combatants would often delay their fight until a later encounter, though they generally did not set a specific time and place. Unauthorized duels were sometimes treated legally as murders unless the combatants had obtained prior permission to fight from their respective brotherhoods or clans.

Duels were also held to test personal fate and showcase military skill. A core tenet of this tradition was "noble enmity," which demanded mutual respect and adherence to Khabze even between fierce rivals. Combatants refrained from exchanging insults and instead offered courtesies. It was customary for duelists to offer their opponent the advantage of the first strike, using justifications such as "You are older, so the right of the first blow is yours," "You are a guest in our lands, strike first," or "I challenged you, so it is your turn to begin". The formal challenge to a duel (known as sch'akuazapydza - Kabardian: щIакIуэзэпыдзэ, chakuazapydza - Adyghe: кIакIозэпыдзэ), was issued by a warrior hurling his cloak on the ground in front of his adversary. During the Russo-Circassian War, Circassian riders seeking fame would ride out and challenge Russian Cossacks and militiamen to duels to test their fate and show off their military prowess. Historically, chivalric duels frequently preceded general military engagements and were used to resolve disputes between renowned warriors. The outcome of a battle or military campaign could be determined by the result of a single combat between champions. These duels typically ended with the death of one combatant. The victor had the right to claim the fallen warrior's weapons and armour. If two men were engaged in a violent duel, a Circassian woman could remove her headscarf and place it on the ground between them, instantly halting the conflict out of supreme respect.

==== Flags and banners (Нып) ====
Each military unit within a Circassian army carried its own banner, which belonged to its commander. The main army flag was that of the supreme commander and was carried by a designated standard-bearer, who remained close to the leader during battle. Orders were signaled through specific flag movements, each signaling a different command. Due to the chaos of battle, some units were unable to perceive flag signals, so instruments such as the types of horns or drums were used to convey commands. The flags were usually accompanied by large drums which was called a Tatar word "dombaz" by the "most noble warriors of the highest rank", according to Khan-Giray. Two main types of banners were used in battles: clan banners, marked with tamgas representing noble families, and tribal banners, representing broader tribes. Clan banners were used by aristocratic units, while tribal banners were carried by commoner-led units. If a campaign was initiated by a public assembly, the tribal banner of the leader served as the main army flag.

A signaling banner (Kabardian: Аргъуажэ нып) was tied to tall poles on mountain tops and burned to send smoke signals when enemy troops were spotted. A negotiation flag (Adyghe: ЗэдэгущыIэ быракъ) and a truce flag (Adyghe: ЗэшIу быракъ) were utilized as communicative objects to announce diplomatic discussions and ceasefires.

In addition to those used in battle and during marching, flags were also used for sports, weddings, religious rituals, graves, ceremonies, and to signal from a distance.

==== Djeguako (ДжэгуакIо) ====
Traditional court poets and singers, known as djeguako, acted as the primary guardians and propagandists of Adyghe Khabze. The code heavily influenced the historical and heroic songs of the Adyghe people. Adyghe Khabze demanded truthfulness and justice from these singers; a song could not falsely overpraise a hero or diminish the bravery of an opponent, as violating this chivalric code was considered a disgrace. Furthermore, if an individual was unjustly accused of a vice, they could be ethically "purified" through a truthful song, provided their actions aligned with the chivalric code of Khabze. Adyghe Khabze turned a blind eye to the temporary, unrestricted "carnival" humor and performances of the djeguako during certain traditional festivals.

==== Naval affairs (Хы ӏофыхэр) ====
Naval operations and sea raids formed a component of the Circassian military tradition. Khabze also governed the organisation of crews at sea. The leader of a crew, the captain, acted as the thamaté of the ship. In fishing trips, the thamaté managed the group's tasks, secured commissions, and distributed the earnings. When men formed a fishing crew, the thamaté received an extra half-share of the catch. Sailors held voting rights concerning the arrangements of a voyage, but they maintained subordination to their captain once underway. During combat engagements, crews fought in a coordinated manner and followed the directions of their commander, who signaled the position of each galley using a pole. The captain led the crew in traditional rowing chants that maintained the pace of the vessel. Rowers sang an air, such as "Arriracha", which was divided into two responding choruses. They matched the strength of their rowing to the tone of the song. On trading and raiding vessels, the captain was often both the shipowner and the cargo owner. He provided for the crew during the voyage. The crews maintained strict subordination to the captain at all times. On the boat, the captain and a few men sat on a deck located near the helm, while the rowers powered the vessel from the main hull. When a vessel arrived with goods, local leaders set exchange rates and collected a tax of 8 to 30 kilograms of salt. This tax was distributed evenly among the families living near the trading site. Similarly, when a ship required hauling onto the shore, the cargo of salt was divided among the neighbourhood families as payment for their labour and to cover the costs of hosting buyers.

=== Khabze Regulations on Nature ===
Circassian flag

The green color in the Circassian flag represents the nature of Circassia, in addition to Islam. Custom dictated that for every tree felled, three new ones had to be planted in its place. When a person built a house, they were obligated to plant trees. Trees were only cut down after the period of sap flow had ended. Additionally, men regularly took fruit tree cuttings into the forest during the spring to graft them onto uncultivated trees. To conserve timber, inhabitants of forested regions often constructed wattle and daub houses rather than log cabins. Deforestation was also prohibited near border areas to maintain natural defences. Rivers and streams were viewed as the arteries of the earth and were required to be kept clean. During the harvest of fruits or nuts, people left at least one-third of the fruits and berries on the branches to provide food for animals and birds.

==== Hunting ====
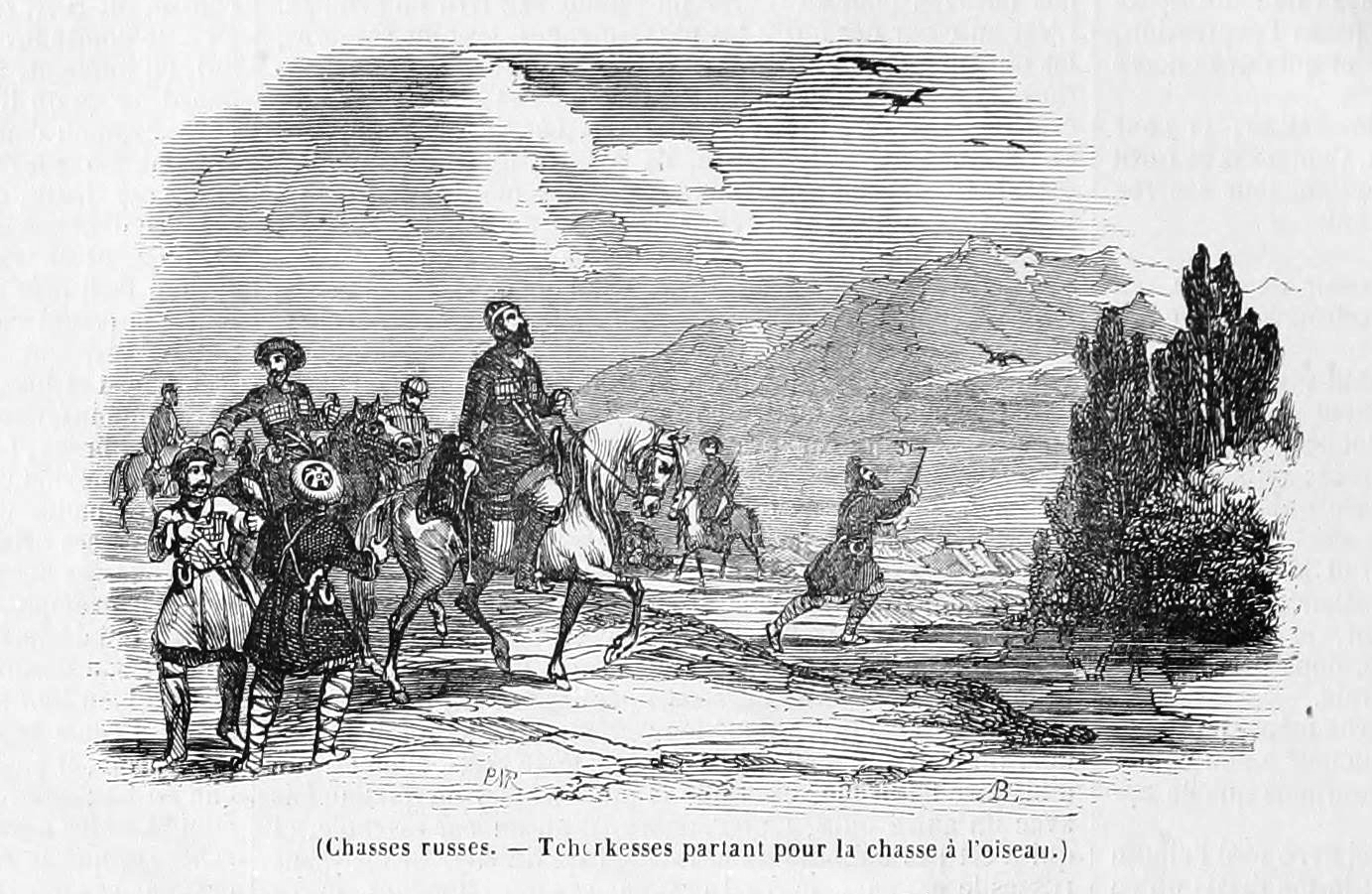
Circassians hunting birds

Hunting served as a primary educational tool for the nobility. Boys began training at the age of two or three. Hunting was a regulated practice governed by the rules of Khabze. Men hunted animals like wild goats, deer, jackals, wolves, boars, foxes, hares, and bears. Wild boars were only hunted as a test of courage, as Circassians did not consume boar meat or use its skin. The hunting season was restricted to the autumn and winter months, running from October to February. Hunting during the spring and summer was banned to allow animals to reproduce and rear their offspring. The only exception to this seasonal restriction was the wolf, which hunters could pursue year-round. Hunters were not allowed to take more game than was required for their immediate needs. It was forbidden to kill females, baby animals, and large males. Furthermore, hunters were not allowed to shoot a stationary animal. Noble hunters must not use traps, snares, or cages. Catching animals with these methods was considered a shameful act. Hunters must not treat their guides or trackers as servants. They must view them as equals, sit with them, and share all their food and drink. Violations of these rules resulted in the hunter being stripped of his hunting rights for the season.

Because they believed some animals could understand regular speech, the nobility developed a secret hunting language known as Chakobsa. This language utilized distorted or inverted words for animals so the prey would not be alerted to the hunters' intentions. The secret language was forbidden to peasants.

Hunters operated alone or in collective groups of seven to eight men. They used bows, spears, darts, and firearms. The use of hounds was common. Hunting with birds of prey, such as falcons and hawks, was also widespread, and women actively participated in this form of hunting. Hunters shared the meat with their companions and gave portions to people they met on their return journey. The senior hunter or leader of the party received designated parts of the animal, such as the head and the skin. Hunters who concealed their catch from the community faced penalties, which could include the confiscation of their livestock. In one hunt, a hunter could only shoot three arrows, if he missed, he could shoot again until he got three successful shots. He was permitted to take exactly three types of animals: one running animal, one flying animal, and one swimming animal. The three arrows in the Circassian flag could be a reference to this practice: because three arrows indicated a hunting trip instead of war, their presence on the flag communicates that the Circassians do not seek conflict but will defend themselves if attacked. In Circassia, three arrows came to be recognized as a symbol of peace. According to Circassian oral history about the creation of the flag, Seferbiy Zaneqo chose that design for this purpose.

=== Mourning and funerals ===
Traditionally, upon a person's passing, a loud mourning cry known as a 'ghiba' is raised in the house. Women and children show their grief through loud sounds. Women may hit their chests or scratch their faces, and men might mark their foreheads as a sign of deep sadness. When neighbors hear the news, they come to the house while making mourning sounds to show they share the pain. A black flag was traditionally hoisted on a tall pole above the family's house for three days, so that passersby would stop by to offer their condolences. The body is prepared according to strict religious and traditional protocols. A religious leader or an elder washes the body using special cloth gloves. Men wash men, and women wash women. They pay close attention to cleanliness, including clipping the nails of the person who died.

Burial is a shared duty for the whole village. No one is hired to dig the grave and instead, men from the village take turns digging it quickly. The body is carried on a wooden frame covered with expensive cloth. On the way to the cemetery, the group stops three times to say prayers. Before the burial, a religious leader performs a ceremony to ask for forgiveness for the person's sins. Money or goods are given to the poor as a gift. If the person was wealthy, a sheep is sacrificed at the grave. In the past, some slaves or servants were even set free at the grave as a final act of kindness by the family. Warriors were buried with their weapons and armor in barrows.

A strict 40-day mourning period is observed, during which the community provides food and support for the grieving family. Mourning continues with special meetings on the 7th and 40th days after the death. During these times, religious leaders read from Qur'an, and food is served to everyone. For the first three nights, religious men stay at the house to pray to Allah until the morning light. For respected families, a large event is held one year after the death. It includes horse races where winners receive prizes. Friends bring horses decorated with fabrics to honor the memory of the dead. There is a big feast with games like target shooting to show military skills. The clothes and weapons of the person who died are put on display for visitors to see.

There are strict rules about how men show sadness. It is considered shameful for a man to cry for his close relatives, but he can show sadness for a friend. Wives wear black for one year and avoid sleeping in soft beds as a sign of respect. For young warriors who die, a spear would be placted at their grave with a flag tied to it. When an important warrior died on a battlefield, a colorful banner with their family's tamga was placed on top of the burial mound as grave made for them. According to Khan Giray, over time, some of these traditions became simpler because of religious changes. Leaders began to discourage the games and races during the first year anniversary of the death, calling them non-religious, though the community kept many of these customs alive for a long time by the time of Khan Giray.

=== Punishment and penal system ===
Historically, Khabze did not utilize prisons, and, except in rare cases, avoided corporal punishments, such as flogging or whipping, as they were considered a violation of a free person's dignity. Instead, the system relied heavily on social condemnation, material compensation, blood revenge, and, in extreme cases of repeat offending, total ostracism or execution.

Punishments for disobeying Khabze varied significantly depending on the nature of the crime and the context of the violation. Circassian society functioned as a highly regulated "culture of shame", where the fear of public disgrace and the loss of honor (napé) served as the primary deterrent against anti-social behavior. The simplest sanction taken against those who act against Khabze is shunning, which includes not attending their funeral or wedding, and otherwise ignoring their existence. The fear of public shame was a powerful deterrent. Disrespecting an elder or a woman resulted in universal contempt. In such cases, the offender's actions could be brought before a people's assembly, and depending on the severity of the offense, they could be punished with strict social ostracism. Thus, individuals who violated ethical norms or displayed cowardice were subjected to intense public shaming and became the subject of mocking songs composed by bards.

For civil and criminal offenses, Khabze prescribed material compensation. During cases of murder or severe injury, there was often cases of blood revenge. However, Khabze provided mechanisms to halt the bloodshed through the payment of a "blood price".

A caught thief was required to return the stolen item and pay a seven-fold penalty of its value, in addition to a standard fine of nine bulls. If the theft involved breaking into a home, the fine was increased to compensate for the "dishonor of the house". Hospitality was considered a sacred duty. If a host failed to protect a guest, they faced severe social ostracism. In cases involving severe breaches of the knightly code, such as the betrayal of a friend, punishments were designed to leave an indelible mark of dishonor. Folklore preserves accounts of traitors being subjected to shaming punishments, such as having their beards cut off, fingers severed, and faces branded, so that their loss of honor was permanently visible to the entire society.

Crimes against a woman's honor were viewed as the most grievous offenses, often provoking immediate blood revenge that could rarely be settled peacefully. If an individual consistently violated traditional norms, engaged in theft, or disrupted the peace, the assembly could record them in a "penalty journal". If an individual was an incorrigible criminal, or committed acts such as rape, they would be declared a psikhadz (Adyghe: псыхадзэ, lit. 'thrown into the water'). Such an outlaw lost all legal rights and protections, and could be killed, robbed, or enslaved by anyone without fear of blood revenge. If they did not flee immediately, they were often chained to a tree and shot by a slave, sold into slavery, or executed by having a stone tied around their neck and being thrown into a river.

== Khabze and religion ==
Although historically influenced by the dominant religion, Khabze is not a religion. It is pre-Christian and pre-Islamic, with its roots in the Nartiad. The ancient pagan religion of the Circassians should not be mistaken with the secular Khabze code; doing so is considered a "common mistake". The ancient pagan religion regulated the spiritual and ritual domains, but the Khabze regulated the daily aspects of a Circassian's life. Thus, Khabze is independent from religion: as the Circassians transitioned from paganism to Christianity and then to Islam, the external religious framework served primarily to validate and reinforce the pre-existing Khabze codes. All new concepts introduced by these new religious ideologies were simply integrated into Khabze, which historically co-existed with Christianity, and now co-exists with Islam. During the Christian era, adherence to Khabze was elevated to a religious duty of a good Christian, and later a good Muslim. This is also when the Circassian word for God, "Tha" (Adyghe: Тхьэ), shifted its meaning to refer to the Abrahamic God.

Historically, "traditional Islam" in Circassia, Sunni Islam of the Hanafi school, accommodated the rules of Khabze, allowing customary laws to regulate communal life, social behavior, and conflict resolution alongside religious practices. Being a good Muslim (Adyghe: Быслъымэныгъэ; Kabardian: Муслъымэныгъэ) involved following Khabze in addition to knowledge of the Quran and observance of Islamic rituals. Those who embodied this synthesis were considered the cultured, pious elite of society. This principle gave birth to the creed "The Creator is in heaven and the Adyghaghe granted by Him is on earth".

However, following the collapse of the Soviet Union, the region experienced a surge of foreign Islamic influences, including Salafism (often referred to locally as Wahhabism), a reformist movement seeking to "purify" the Islamic faith. Unlike traditional Sunni Islam, Salafism was hostile towards Khabze, viewing the historical co-existence of Islam and Khabze as a deviation from the faith. The Salafi movement sought to operate as a universalist project that actively strips Islam of any ethnic or local content. Consequently, Salafis rejected the customary laws of Khabze and demanded the eradication of local norms, leading to hostility between believers of "traditional Islam" and "Salafi Islam". The Salafi movement declared adherents of traditional Islam as infidels (takfir). In response, Islamic scholars and chief spiritual officiers of the Caucasus region defended "traditional Islam" and its coexistence with local customs against the Salafi movement. In some cases, the tension between the two parties has escalated into factional violence, particularly in Kabardino-Balkaria. Folk leaders advocating for Khabze traditions such as Aslan Tsipinov have been assassinated. The killing of Tsipinov was controversial, as disagreement arose within the Salafi movement regarding the justification for targeting him, as some members questioned how his death benefited their cause. The Salafi movement also assassinated Islamic scholars who defended "Traditional Islam", such as the deputy mufti of Dagestan, Ahmad Tagayev, the rector of the Islamic institute in Cherkessk, Ismail Bostanov, rector of the Islamic University of the North Caucasus, Maksid Sadikov, as well as the mufti of Kabadino-Balkaria, Anas Pshikhachev, as well as some of their family members. Pshikhachev was known for defending traditional Sunni Islam and accusing the Salafis of being deviants, serving as the leader of the traditional movement. Despite the tensions, Salafis remain a small minority among the Muslims of the Caucasus. The local clergy has also declared their adherence to "traditional Islam" and their strong opposition to "untraditional" Salafi Islam.

=== New Age spirituality ===
In the late 20th century, elements of the Khabze were adapted into a New Age religion by Murat Yagan, a man of Circassian-Abkhazian descent who emigrated to Canada. Incorporating aspects of Khabze, Circassian paganism, Islam and Christianity, Yagan called his faith "Ahmsta Kebzeh", describing it as an ancient applied science from the Caucasus Mountains aimed at awakening latent human faculties.

=== Khabze and other traditions ===
Khabze contains elements possibly derived from the written laws of external powers. Researchers identify traces of Roman and Byzantine law within Khabze, particularly concerning property rights and family relations. The system also shares similarities with Sharia law, Canon law, the Old Testament, and the legal frameworks of Georgia and Armenia.

Some aspects of Khabze have also variously been compared to Confucianism, the Chinese Dao, and the Sufi concept of adab. Anthropologist B. H. Bgazhnokov explicitly compares the structure of Adyghaghe to Confucianism, noting that both are highly detailed ethical systems concentrated on shaping the homo moralis (a morally ideal person) and establishing strict guidelines for good, evil, justice, and propriety. Regionally, Khabze finds its closest, almost structurally identical counterpart in the Abkhazian ethical code, Apsua Qabz, while Adyghaghe has its own Abkhazian counterpart, Apsuara. The knightly code of Worq Khabze has been compared to medieval European chivalry and the Japanese samurai code of Bushido. The Atalyk system has been compared to youth upbringing traditions of ancient Sparta.

== History and reforms ==
Historically, Khabze has undergone multiple reforms to adapt to the changing needs of the Circassian community.

=== In Circassia ===
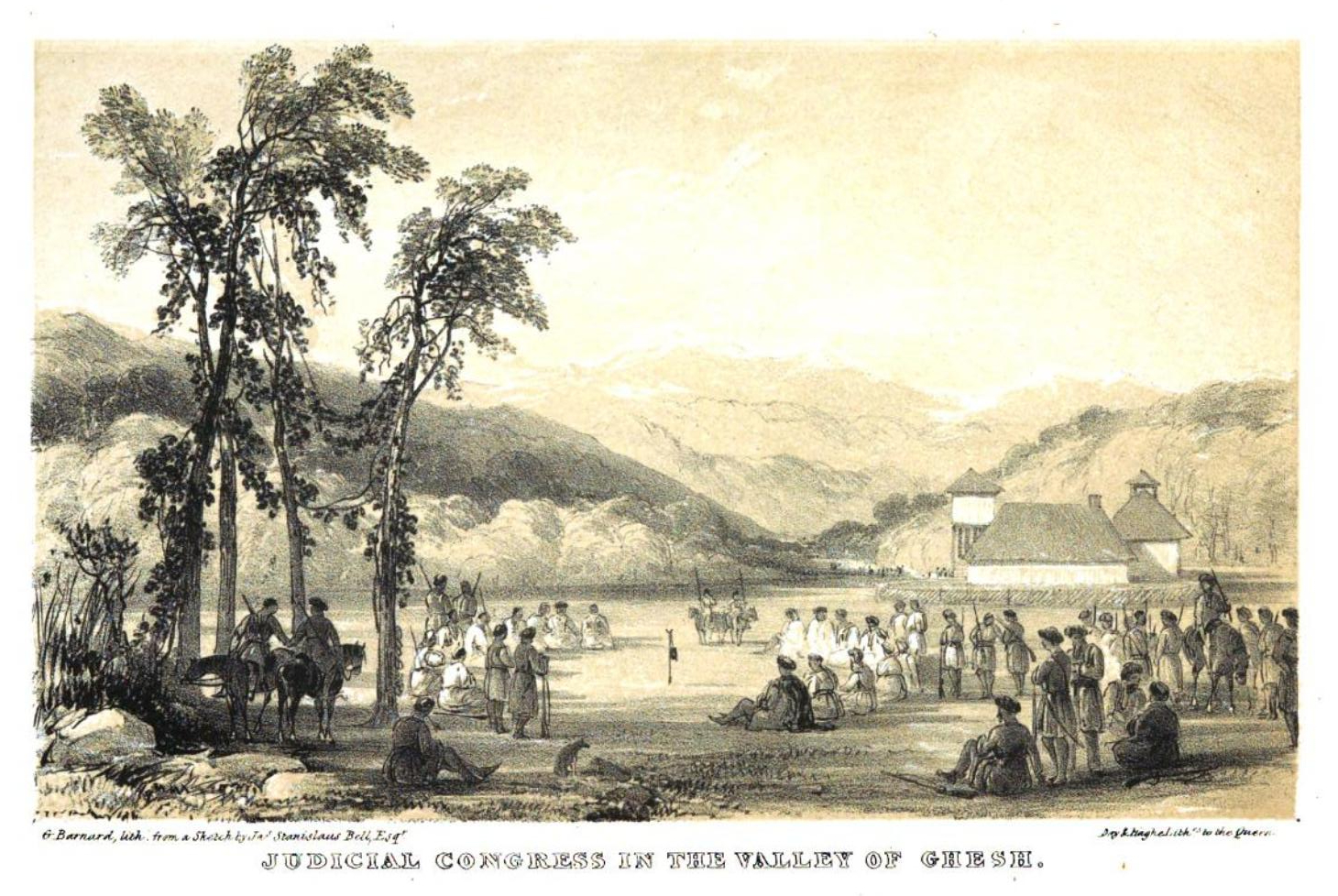
Judicial Congress in the Valley of Ghesh by James Bell

Historically, transformations to Khabze occurred when outdated practices became a social burden and charismatic leaders or communal assemblies emerged to effect change. The rules of Khabze were traditionally established and modified by the Khase (Assembly). The Khase acts as the supreme legislative and decision-making body, gathering representatives from all regions to resolve issues by unanimous consensus. Khase served as the supreme legislative organ of historical Circassia. The Khase functioned much like a state parliament, regulating societal life through debate and consensus. Its agenda included resolving major political issues, such as war, peace, and foreign alliances, but it also functioned as a "chamber of rites" that strictly codified the everyday norms of Khabze. Decisions made by these legislative assemblies held universal authority; they typically spread and were adopted very quickly. This is usually led by an elder known as thamaté. The principle was "If Khabze needs changing, the standard is altered" (Хабзэр зэхъокIыпхъэ шIымэ, бзыпхъэр тырехы) and "Khabze is flexible" (Хабзэр тIасхъэпшIэшъ). However, once could not introduce practices contrary to established Khabze, known as "un-Khabze" (Adyghe: Мыхабзэ) on their own.

Some of these reforms are known. One of the earliest recorded major reforms was initiated by Prince Beslan (historically nicknamed "The Fat"). His interventions primarily focused on updating the structural components of Khabze, specifically modifying the highly stratified peerage and class system of the era to better suit the political landscape. A significant modernization of Adyghe Khabze is attributed to the 18th-century thamaté Jabagh Qazanoqo. Qazanoqo defined Khabze as "that which is appropriate" or "harmonious" (Adyghe: хабзэр екIурэ). He systematically stripped away obsolete practices. He restricted the absolute power of the princes over the free peasantry, advocated for increased rights for women, and completely transformed the system of blood revenge (Adyghe: лъышӀэжь). To break the cycle of vendettas, he formalized a reconciliatory ritual wherein a murderer could adopt and raise a child from the victim's family, thereby forging an artificial kinship that peacefully and legally terminated the feud. He is also credited with reconciling Khabze with the norms of Sunni Islam. Within Circassian studies, there is an academic field called "Qazanoqo studies" (казаноковедение). Qazanoqo is sometimes erroneously credited with creating the Khabze code. In one study, a Circassian man from the Uzunyayla region of Turkey has been quoted as saying "our Uzunyayla Khabze was established by Qazanoqo Jabagh" (Узун-Яйлэм ди хабзэр зыухуар Къэзэнокъуэ Жэбагъыс).

The Khabze code underwent another significant update at the beginning of the 19th century when a supreme council of Circassian judges and scholars, acting with the blessing and consensus of the nobility, amended various articles of the customary law to adapt to the shifting geopolitical and internal conditions of the time. Officially known as the "National Condition", it was enacted on 10 July 1807. The primary objective of the 1807 reform was to officially integrate Islamic Sharia law into the public judicial system, giving legal foundation to spiritual courts known as mehkeme. The council decreed that, going forward, the majority of civil, family, and criminal matters would be decided according to Sharia, which introduced an entirely new system of legal procedures, testimony requirements, and severe physical punishments that contrasted sharply with the traditional Khabze system of material fines.

Between the late 18th and early 19th centuries, Khabze began transitioning into positive law. The most comprehensive codification of these laws, the "Complete Collection of Kabardian Ancient Customs," was published between 1843 and 1844. This document compiled the oral laws into 12 sections and 127 paragraphs, formally categorizing the legal branches of the system.

==== Defter ====
A "defter" (Adyghe: Дэфтэр) in Circassia was an act document in which Khabze rulings were written, it was recorded by an effendi (Islamic scholar). The attendees then validated the document by affixing their seals (Adyghe: мыхъур) or ink-stained fingers to it, giving the text binding legal force, thus making it a part of Adyghe Khabze. The process of enacting a defter was highly formalized. After a popular assembly reached a decision, the people would swear an oath on the Quran to uphold it. These documents functioned as formal laws, binding contracts, or societal conditions that guided legal and social life in Circassia during the Late Middle Ages and Modern Times. Most famous was the Defter of 1841, which banned trade with Russians and declared Sharia law as the supreme law of Circassia.

==== Soviet era ====
Adyghe Khabze in the Caucasus underwent significant disruption during the 19th and 20th centuries. The Russo-Circassian War and the Circassian genocide contributed to the erosion of some traditions and the weakening of the traditional societal structure. Soviet policies subsequently targeted traditional institutions, characterizing the authority of elders and private economic initiative as "reactionary" and seeking to replace them with communist ideology. Measures were taken to reduce the influence of the elders and the effendis, including the removal of their voting rights. Efforts were made to encourage generational conflict between youth and elders, which in some cases met with resistance from segments of the population.

Certain Khabze practices were criminalized, carrying penalties of imprisonment or death penalty in periods of conflict. Disarmament campaigns were conducted to confiscate daggers and firearms. Soviet authorities also treated the Circassian diaspora in Turkey with suspicion. State narratives alleged that Circassians in Turkey lived in poverty and were exploited, though these claims served clear political purposes. Dozens of Adyghe villages were renamed, with auls historically bearing the names of their founding noble families replaced with politically neutral or ideologically aligned designations. In response to these changes, segments of the Circassian population engaged in various forms of resistance, including boycotts, concealment of crops and livestock from requisitioning, protection of targeted community members, and, in some instances, armed uprisings such as the Baksan rebellion of 1928. As a result, much of the traditional culture retreated into the domestic and family spheres. Following the collapse of the Soviet Union, efforts to revive and reassert Adyghe Khabze increased notably.

=== In diaspora ===
Following the catastrophic events of the 19th-century Russo-Circassian War and the Circassian genocide, which resulted in the destruction of the Circassian homeland and the mass deportation of its population, the adaptive dynamism of Khabze became a critical tool for the survival of the Circassian diaspora. In foreign countries, the diaspora strived to preserve the foundations of their ethnic culture, language, and moral code under pressures of assimilation.

Over time, Khabze changed under the influence of host nations and adopted local traditions. In some countries, external political pressure forced the radical modification or suppression of Khabze. In Turkey, strict Kemalist assimilation policies in the 1920s and 1930s severely disrupted the practice of Khabze. The government passed laws that banned the public wearing of traditional Caucasian dress, outlawed the playing of national musical instruments, and forced Circassians to abandon their traditional family names in favour of artificially created Turkish ones. This state-sponsored pressure forced much of the cultural preservation underground.

Khabze evolved to defend against new problems. In the diaspora, the traditional self-governing assembly, the Khase, was reformed to function within modern state structures. Initially, in Ottoman-era Syria, the Khase retained its actual judicial and legal authority over the immigrant Circassian population; internal disputes and conflicts were resolved exclusively by elected elders according to Khabze law, deliberately preventing the interference of Ottoman state courts. By the mid-20th century, these traditional councils evolved into legally recognised "Circassian Councils" or "Circassian Associations" (Turkish: Çerkes Derneği; Adyghe: Адыгэ Хасэ). Such organisations were established in Jordan in 1932, Syria in 1948, the United States in 1952, and Turkey in 1961. These associations became the modern iteration of the traditional Khase, shifting their focus from legal jurisprudence to charity, the administration of cultural and educational programmes for the youth, and acting as the official representative voice of the community. These associations actively codified Khabze principles into their operational charters to protect Circassian culture, language, and moral values in an alien ethnic environment. Most if not all Circassian communities now have their own association and communicate internationally via the International Circassian Association.

In Syria and Jordan, major family celebrations, such as weddings, were modified so that invitations were restricted almost exclusively to representatives of the Circassian community. This exclusivity developed as a defence mechanism to ensure the survival and cohesion of their small, isolated communities in an alien environment. Where communities settled compactly, such as in Paterson, New Jersey (USA), traditional systems of mutual support and daily social visitation were adapted to modern urban life. In the 1960s among the Circassian diaspora living in the Uzunyayla region of Turkey, the community was facing a severe socio-economic crisis which was preventing young people from marrying. To resolve this, local community leaders and elders convened a traditional meeting, Khase, called "Yahyabey Khase" (named after its location) to actively reform the Khabze. They consciously eradicated the burdensome financial requirements of the old custom and formalized new manageable rules for marriage.

=== Status of Khabze ===
In the modern age, Khabze transitioned from a comprehensive, binding legal constitution into a more flexible system of etiquette and ethnic identity, serving as a defense mechanism against assimilation. The demands of modern urban life, economic pressures, and globalization have necessitated the simplification of many complex traditional practices. Circassian terminology explicitly reflects this evolution by distinguishing between Old Khabze (Adyghe: Хабзэжъ) and New Khabze (Adyghe: ХабзэкIэ). Many traditions were simplified, preserving the spirit of the law. Today, adherence to Khabze is primarily observed through specific limited practices. These practices include Khabze meetings, respect for elders (thamatés) and opposite gender, wedding ceremonies, seating arrangements during gatherings, and funeral conduct. The system discarded outdated virtues and incorporated new priorities into its framework. The pursuit of education has become a core component of modern Khabze: Education now represents a person's social status alongside traditional concepts like etiquette.

A study conducted over five years with a sample size of 2,500 from territories with Circassian population: Adygea, Kabardino-Balkaria, Karachay-Cherkessia, as well as Krasnodar Krai, Moscow, St. Petersburg, Krasnodar, and Istanbul found that 97% of people who identify as Circassian said they tried to follow Khabze to some extent. 55% said that they try to follow them, 21% said they follow them, but not always, 20% said they follow them constantly, and 3% said they are practically not guided by these norms in their actions. Today, in some schools of the Caucasus, Khabze is taught as a subject to Circassians.

== Khabze in practice ==
The practical application of Adyghe Khabze sometimes differed from its theoretical presentation. While Khabze was enforced by social ostracism and remained the primary source of law in Circassia, it was not uniformy followed. While Circassian tradition emphasised Khabze as a universal code regulating personal honor, social obligations, and community harmony, historical records document cases of class biases, violations, exploitation of loopholes, and selective compliance.

Khabze norms in Circassia were not uniform across regions. While the basic principles remained the same, legal provisions varied by principality, district, and tribe. Broadly, two parallel schools of Khabze existed between aristocratic and democratic societies of Circassia. Aristocratic groups including the Kabardians, Besleneys, Chemguys, Bzhedugs, and Hatuqays retained Worq Khabze (the noble or knightly code). In these regions, Khabze codified strict caste hierarchies. The second school of Khabze, upheld by the democratic societies, mainly Shapsugs, Natukhays, and Abzakhs, abolished or curtailed feudal privileges (especially during the Circassian Revolution). Their regional assemblies instituted modified versions of Khabze based on equality among free commoners. It has been recorded that Western Circassian groups (such as the Shapsugs) maintained some older traditions related to marriage that Eastern Circassian groups (such as Kabardians or Besleneys) did not. In some cases, differences of interpretation of Khabze led to war between Circassian regions, such as the Bziyiqo War, fought between feudal and democratic factions, where both sides justified their actions using Khabze and attempted militarily to justify their stance.

== See also ==
- Nart saga
- Lezgiwal
- Adat
