= Federal Lezgian National and Cultural Autonomy =

Russian public organization

Federal Lezgian National and Cultural Autonomy (Russian: Федеральная лезгинская национально-культурная автономия, romanized: Federalnaya lezginskaya natsionalno-kulturnaya avtonomiya) is the largest public organization of Lezgians in Russia, founded in 1999 in Moscow. It is headquartered in the capital, and the responsibilities of the organization cover the entire country.
