= Lezgiwal =

Worldview and moral code of the Lezgin people

The Lezgiwal (Lezgian: лезги́вал, [lezgi:wal]) is the worldview and moral code of the Lezgin people. Tenets of the Lezgiwal include being especially respectful towards elders and (for men) women; a policy of only marrying another Lezgin in order to protect the nation's endangered culture; and exemplifying the values of truthfulness, honour, and bravery. A Lezgin's behavior towards the environment is always subject to this law, wherever he is.

== Laws ==
=== Faith (Chalakhwal) ===
According to Lezgiwal, the main purpose and meaning of a Lezgin's life is to serve his people (Lezgin) and religion (Islam). The Lezgin tolerates representatives of other religions and nationalities and never imposes his views (Lezgiwal) or way of life (Islam) on others by force and oppression. True religion and justice are the highest spiritual goals of Lezgins. The Lezgin does not emphasize his religiosity because he does not change his “true religion for a show religion.”

=== Honor (Juvwal) ===
The most precious thing in a Lezgin is his honor and dignity. All other goods of this world can be regained once lost, but lost honor and dignity can only be regained through an honorable death. Therefore, he does not covet the honor of others. A Lezgin treats a woman with respect and honor. Under no circumstances will he ever allow himself or others to insult or humiliate her. For a Lezgin, a woman's honor and dignity are sacred.

=== Respect (Qilikhwal) ===
Lezgins always stand up when an elder comes, even if they do not recognize him or her. In communicating with people, a Lezgin must be extremely polite, reserved and modest, regardless of their social status or age. At the same time, he or she should be respectful both in joy and in sorrow, and keep calm no matter what the situation. The life of a Lezgin should be an example of high morals, wisdom and courage for the younger generation.

=== Mercy (Khsanwal) ===
A Lezgin must be compassionate towards the weak and powerless. He should be compassionate not only for people, but also for animals who have no reason and cannot protect themselves from human cruelty. If possible, a Lezgin should avoid fighting with someone weaker than himself, because such a fight will not bring him glory. But he should never hesitate to fight a stronger opponent.

=== Valor (Vikehwal) ===
A Lezgin must develop his body and mind through regular exercise. He must have the strength and knowledge to adequately defend the honor of his nation and religion when necessary. Because there needs to be enough strength and knowledge to achieve true faith, unity and justice.

== See also ==
- Lezgins
- Lezgin language
- Dagestan
- Adyghe Xabze

== Sources ==
- Муьзеффер Меликмамедов «ЦIай алпанар, цIайлапанар»
