= Lezgins =

Ethnic group in Dagestan (Russia) and Azerbaijan

Лезгияр, Леккзияр, Лекьер Lezgiyar, Lekkziyar, Leq'er
- Flag used by the Lezgin people

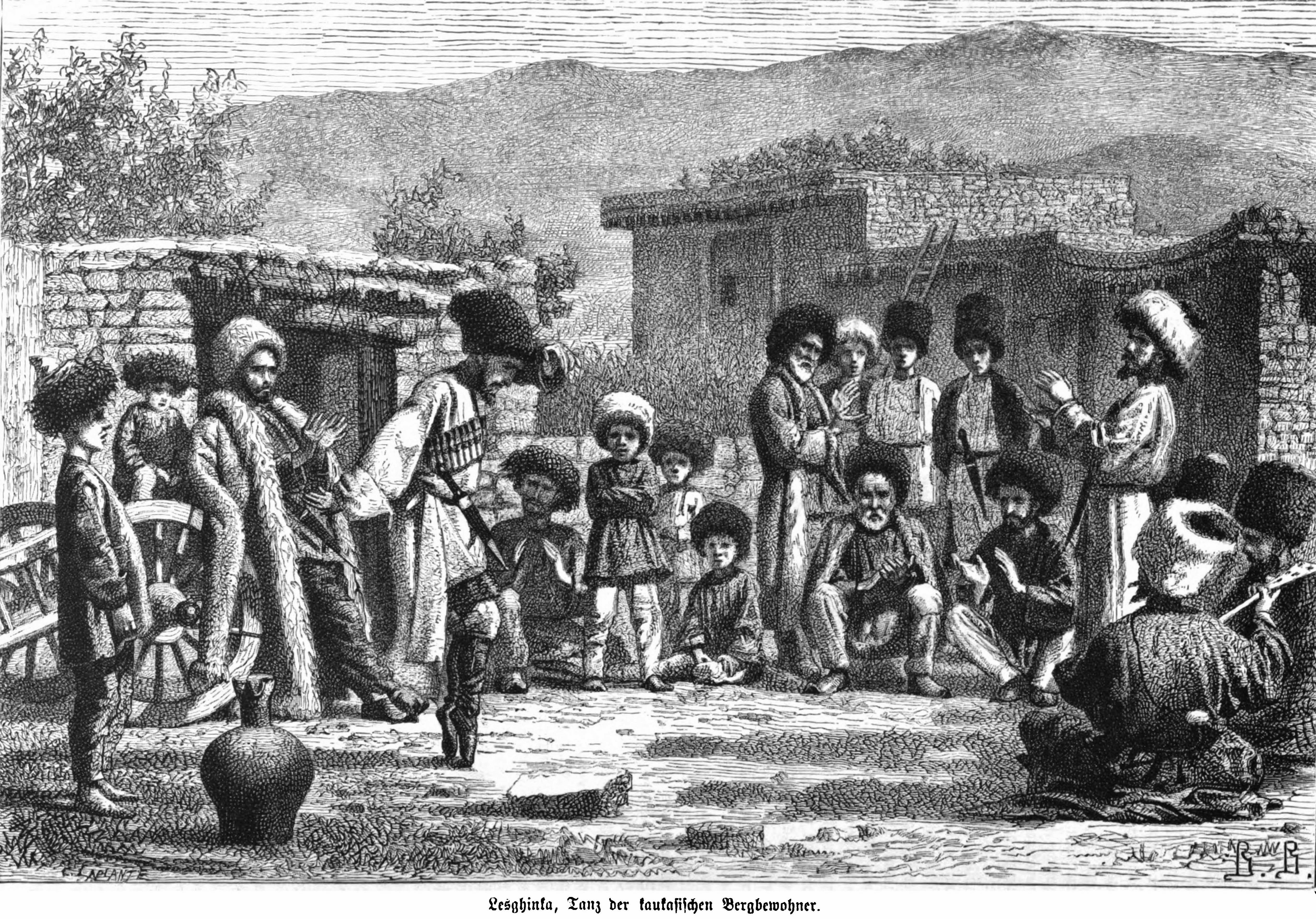

Total population
- 1.2 million

Languages
- Lezgian language

Religion
- Islam (mainly Sunni)

Related ethnic groups
- Especially Lezgic ethnic groups and other Northeast Caucasian peoples

Lezgins (Lezgian: Лезгияр, romanized: lezgiär) are a Northeast Caucasian ethnic group native to southern Dagestan, a republic of Russia, and northern Azerbaijan, who speak the Lezgin language. Their social structure is firmly based on equality and deference to individuality. Lezgin society is structured around djamaat (Lezgian: жамаат, lit. 'unions of clans') and has traditionally been egalitarian and organised around many autonomous local clans, called sykhyls (сихилар).

The land of the Lezgins has been subject to multiple invaders throughout history. Its isolated terrain and the strategic value outsiders have placed on the areas settled by Lezgins has contributed much to the Lezgin community ethos and helped shape its national character. Due to constant attacks from the invaders, the Lezgins have developed a national code of honor and conduct, Lezgiwal, passed down from generation to generation by parents and society. It implies moral and ethical behaviour, generosity and the will to safeguard the honor of women.

== Etymology ==
The self-designation of the Lezgins in Lezgian: Лезгияр, romanized: lezgiär, Lezgian: Леккзияр, romanized: lekkziär or Lezgian: лекьер, romanized: leq'er or leqʼ, sometimes also transcribed as lekk(er); the third sound is a voiceless uvular ejective.

The name is very old, as demonstrated by historical external designations in sources such as Strabo (XI.5.1): Ancient Greek Λῆγαι (Légai), Latin Legae, Armenian Լեկք (Lekk'), Georgian ლეკ(ნ)ი (lek’(n)i), Arabic اللاكزي (al-Lākzi), and similarly in Persian. Other external designations include Russian Лезгины (Lesginy) and the English Lezgins. In the narrower sense, the term refers to the Lezgins proper; in a broader sense, it is sometimes used as a collective designation for the indigenous Lezgic ethnic groups of southern Dagestan and northern Azerbaijan, who inhabit the basin of the Samur River from the eastern Greater Caucasus to the Caspian Sea. The name Lek lives on today in the name of the Lezgins, who live in southern Dagestan and northern Azerbaijan. The eagle being the Lezgin national animal, the term Lezgi is said to derive from Lek, the Lezgin word for eagle. Others believe Lezgi to be derived from the ancient Legi and early medieval Lakzi.

Ancient Greek historians, including Herodotus, Strabo, and Pliny the Elder, referred to the Legoi (or Ancient Greek: Λῆχαι, romanized: Lē̂chai) people who inhabited Caucasian Albania. Arab historians of the 9th and 10th centuries mentioned a kingdom called Lakz, in present-day southern Dagestan. Al Masoudi referred to inhabitants of this area as Lakzans (Lezgins), who defended Shirvan against invaders from the north.

Prior to the Russian Revolution, "Lezgin" was a term applied to all ethnic groups inhabiting the present-day Russian Republic of Dagestan. In the 19th century, the term was used more broadly for all ethnic groups speaking non-Nakh Northeast Caucasian languages, including Caucasian Avars, Laks, and many others (although the Vainakh peoples, who were Northeast Caucasian language speakers were referred to as "Circassians").

Ethnonyms of the Leks
Ancient self-designation		Modern self-designation		
Lek	Leg	Legzi	Lekzi	Lezgi
Лекь	Лекь	Лекьзи	Леккзи	Лезги

== History ==
In the 4th century BC, the numerous Lezgin tribes speaking Lezgic languages united in a union of 26 tribes, formed in the Eastern Caucasus state of Caucasian Albania, which itself was incorporated in the Persian Achaemenid Empire in 513 BC. Under Persian and Parthian rule Caucasian Albania was divided into several areas—Lakzi, Shirvan, etc.

The Lezgic speaking tribes participated in the battle of Gaugamela under the Persian banner against the invading Alexander the Great.

Under Parthian rule, Iranian political and cultural influence increased in the whole region of their Caucasian Albanian province, therefore including where the Lezgic speaking tribes lived. Whatever the sporadic suzerainty of Rome of the region due to their wars with the Parthians, the country was now a part—together with Iberia (East Georgia) and (Caucasian) Albania, where other Arsacid branches reigned—of a pan-Arsacid family federation. Culturally, the predominance of Hellenism, as under the Artaxiads, was now followed by again a predominance of "Iranianism", and, symptomatically, instead of Greek, as before, Parthian became the language of the educated of the region. An incursion in this era was made by the Alans who between 134 and 136 attacked regions including where Lezgic tribes lived, but Vologases persuaded them to withdraw, probably by paying them.

In 252–253, rule over the Lezgic tribes changed from Parthian to Sassanid Persian. Caucasian Albania became a vassal state, now of the Sassanids, but retained its monarchy; the Albanian king had no real power and most civil, religious, and military authority lay with the Sassanid marzban (military governor) of the territory.

The Roman Empire obtained control over some of the southernmost Lezgin regions for a few years around 300 AD, but then the Sassanid Persians regained control and subsequently dominated the area for centuries until the Arab invasions.

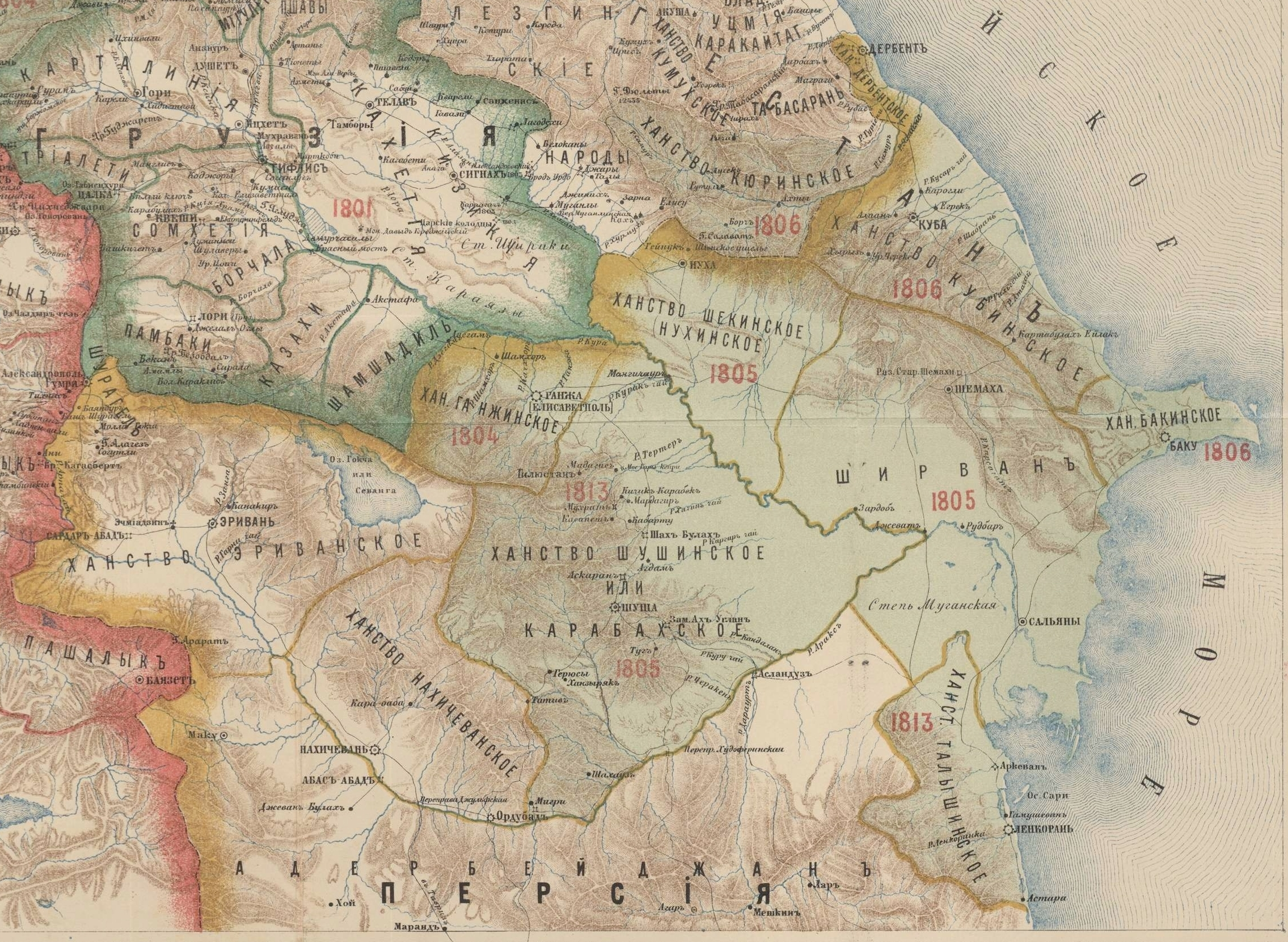
Many Lezgins lived in the Persian-ruled Derbent khanate, which Russia occupied and dissolved in 1813.

Although Lezgins were first introduced to Islam perhaps as early as the 8th century, the Lezgins remained primarily animist until the 15th century, when Muslim influence became stronger, with Persian traders coming in from the south, and the Golden Horde increasingly pressing from the north. In the early 16th century, the Persian Safavids consolidated their control over large parts of Dagestan for centuries onwards. As a result of the Ottoman–Safavid War of 1578–1590, the Ottomans managed to wrest control of the region for a short period of time, until it was regained by the Safavids under king Abbas I (r. 1588–1629).

A notable Lezgin from the Safavid Iranian era was Fath-Ali Khan Daghestani, who served as Safavid grand vizier from 1716 to 1720, during the reign of king (shah) Sultan Husayn (1694–1722).

Illustration of Haji Davud with his allies (Haji Davud in the middle)

By the early course of the 18th century, the Safavid Empire was in a state of heavy decline. In 1721 a Lezgin leader and sunni cleric of southern Dagestan Haji Davud led his campaign into Shirvan, and managed to sack and loot the city of Shamakhi, the provincial capital of Shirvan, the sack of Shamakhi was one of the cruciel events contributing to the eventual decline of the Safavid Empire, and the creation of the short lived Lezgin led Shirvan Khanate recognized by the Ottoman Empire under the reign of Sultan Ahmed III.

The Lezgin led Shirvan Khanate controlled a vast territories from the Samur Valley and Quba region all the way through central Shirvan, the capital of the Khanate being Shamakhi. The Ottomans recognised Davud's authority over southern Dagestan, Shirvan, and Shaki, and proclaimed him as the rightful Khan of those lands.

In the first half of the 18th century, Persia was able to restore its full authority throughout the entire Caucasus under Nader Shah. After the death of Nader, the area divided into multiple khanates. Some Lezgins were part of the Kuba Khanate in what is now Azerbaijan, while others fell under the jurisdiction of the Derbent Khanate and Kura Khanate. The main part of Lezgins united in "free society" (Magalim) Akhtypara (now Akhtynsky District), Kure (now Kurakhsky District), Altypara and Dokuzpara (now Dokuzparinsky District)). Some Lezgin clans were in the Rutul Federation.

In 1813, as a result of the Treaty of Gulistan, the Russians gained control over southern Dagestan and most of what is the contemporary Azerbaijan Republic. The 1828 Treaty of Turkmenchay indefinitely consolidated Russian control over Dagestan and other areas where the Lezgins lived and removed Iran from the military equation. The Russian administration subsequently created the Kiurin Khanate, later to become the Kiurin district. Many Lezgins in Dagestan, however, participated in the Great Caucasian War that started roughly during the same time the Russo-Persian Wars of the 19th century were happening, and fought against the Russians alongside the Avar Imam Shamil, who for 25 years (1834–1859) defied Russian rule. It was not until after his defeat in 1859 that the Russians consolidated their rule over Dagestan and the Lezgins.

=== Lezgin genocide ===
Also known as the March Days, the Bolsheviks, in alliance with the Dashnaks, began to forcibly establish Soviet rule in the Kuba uezd. The Lezgin population, refusing to recognize the new regime, put up armed resistance. In April 1918, after three days of fierce fighting, the Lezgins drove the Bolsheviks out of the city, though they suffered 200 casualties. On May 1, 1918, a two-thousand-strong punitive detachment commanded by Hamazasp and Nikolai entered the district. Hamazasp openly declared his intent to annihilate all Muslims from the Caspian coast to Mount Shahdag. As a result, 162 villages in the region were burned, 27 of which were completely destroyed.

The decisive battle took place on May 18, 1918, in the village of Lezgi-Digah. Lezgin forces, led by Imam Muskhab-Ali Kuzunvi, abrek Haddam Chakarvi, and Alibek Zizikvi, dealt a crushing defeat to the invaders. Hamazasp fled to Baku with only a remnants of his detachment, consisting of about 100-200 men. During these events, more than 16,000 civilians were killed in the district, including 14,000 Lezgins and 2,000 Azerbaijanis and Tats who lived alongside them. The losses of the aggressors exceeded 5,000 men. Furthermore, in 1918, the Lezgin abrek Mahmud Shtulvi, son of the renowned Lezgin Islamic scholar Hadji Kasum, arrived from Dagestan leading a detachment of 200 Lezgins to aid the local Lezgin people in the village of Lezgi-Digah. He and his fighters took an active part in fierce battles. The Leks from both sides of the Samur River stood together as a united front.

== Culture ==
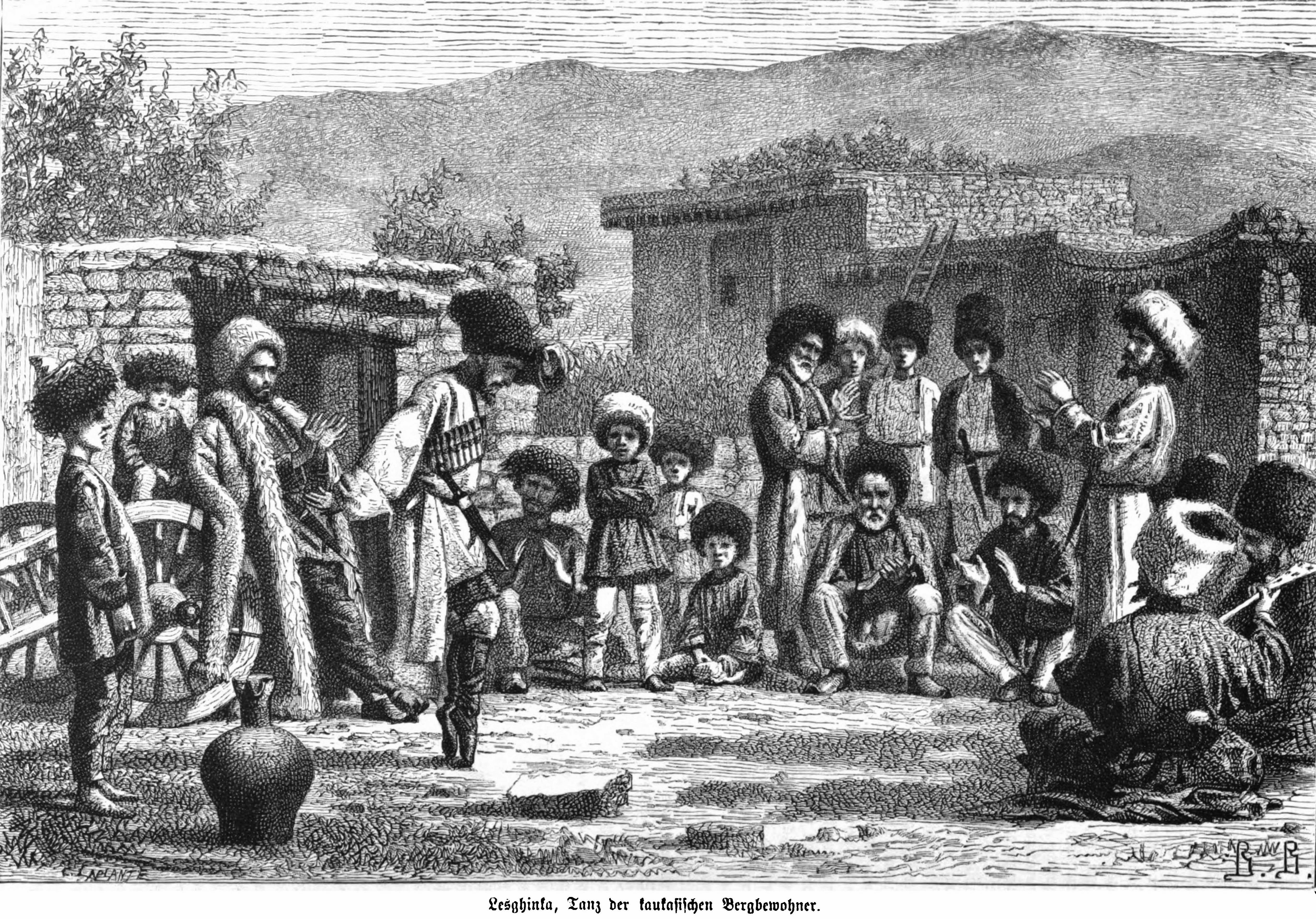
Lezgins in the 1860s

The Lezgin culture is a unique blend of native customs (adats). The eagle, the Lek, is a common symbol in Lezgin artifacts, which is often connected with one of the Lezgins' central values: freedom. Freedom is a recurring theme in Lezgin culture and history. A majority of the group's national heroes are remembered for fighting for independence, including Abrek Kiri Buba and Hadj-Dawud. Coercion is viewed negatively in Lezgin culture, with their social structure being based around the ideas of equality and respecting individuality.

=== Social Structure ===
Lezgin society is structured around djamaat (Lezgian: жамаат- unions of clans), within which there are about 200–300 syhils (Lezgian: сихил - clan). Syhils descended from a long-ago common ancestor, and each syhil has its own village and mountain. Syhils are further subdivided into miresar (patronymic families).

Lezgins often live in villages, known as "hurs." These villages are divided into quarters, with one syhil living in every quarter. Each village has a Kim, or a gathering of the male residents of the village to address the most important issues of the village's public life.

=== Lezgiwal ===
Lezgiwal (Lezgian: Лезгивал) an unwritten code of honor used as a set of ethical rules for Lezgins. It covers all spheres of life of any member of society, starting from childhood. Lezgival is a Code of honor and conduct passed down from generation to generation by parents and society. It implies moral and ethical behaviour, generosity and the will to safeguard the honor of women. The legendary Abrek Kiri Buba before he was killed by the Russians said "Better a knife in the chest than honor in the dirt."

=== Religion ===
Lezgins like other Northeast Caucasian majority are Muslims, although, due to the long traditional beliefs, religion did not take root in its strict form. Under the influence of the neighbouring states, it was to a known extent suppressed, predominantly by Soviets, and nowadays plays a less significant role than the cultural traditions. However, the practitioners follow either the Shafi'i or the Hanafi schools of jurisprudence, fiqh. Lezgins celebrate Yaran Suvar, which dates to the pre-Islamic period, some also celebrate Ramadan and Eid al-Fitr.

=== Languages and literature ===
The Lezgin language belongs to the Lezgic branch of the Northeast Caucasian language family (with Aghul, Rutul, Tsakhur, Tabasaran, Budukh, Khinalug, Jek, Khaput, Kryts, and Udi). The Lezgin language has three closely related (mutually intelligible) dialects: Kurin (also referred to as Gunei or Kurakh), Akhti, and Kuba. The Kurin dialect is the most widespread of the three and is spoken throughout most of the Lezgin territories in Daghestan, including the town of Kurakh, which, historically, was the most important cultural, political, and economic center in the Lezgin territory in Daghestan and is the former seat of the khanate of Kurin. The Akhti dialect is spoken in southeastern Daghestan. The Kuba dialect, the most Turkicized of the three, is widespread among the Lezgins of northern Azerbaijan (named for the town of Kuba, the cultural and economical focus of the region).

=== Dances and music ===
Lezgin dance, including the Lezgin solo male and pair dance, are common among many peoples of the Caucasus. The dance uses a 2 image. The man moves in the way "eagle", alternates between a slow and rapid pace. The most spectacular movements are dance movements of men, when he is on his toes, throwing his hands in different directions. The woman moves in the form of "Swan", bewitching graceful posture and smooth hand movements. The woman increases the tempo of her dance after the man. Not surprisingly, the dance, common among all the Caucasian peoples, was named in accordance with the ancient totem of the Lezgins: the word "Lek" (Lezgian: лекь) means eagle.

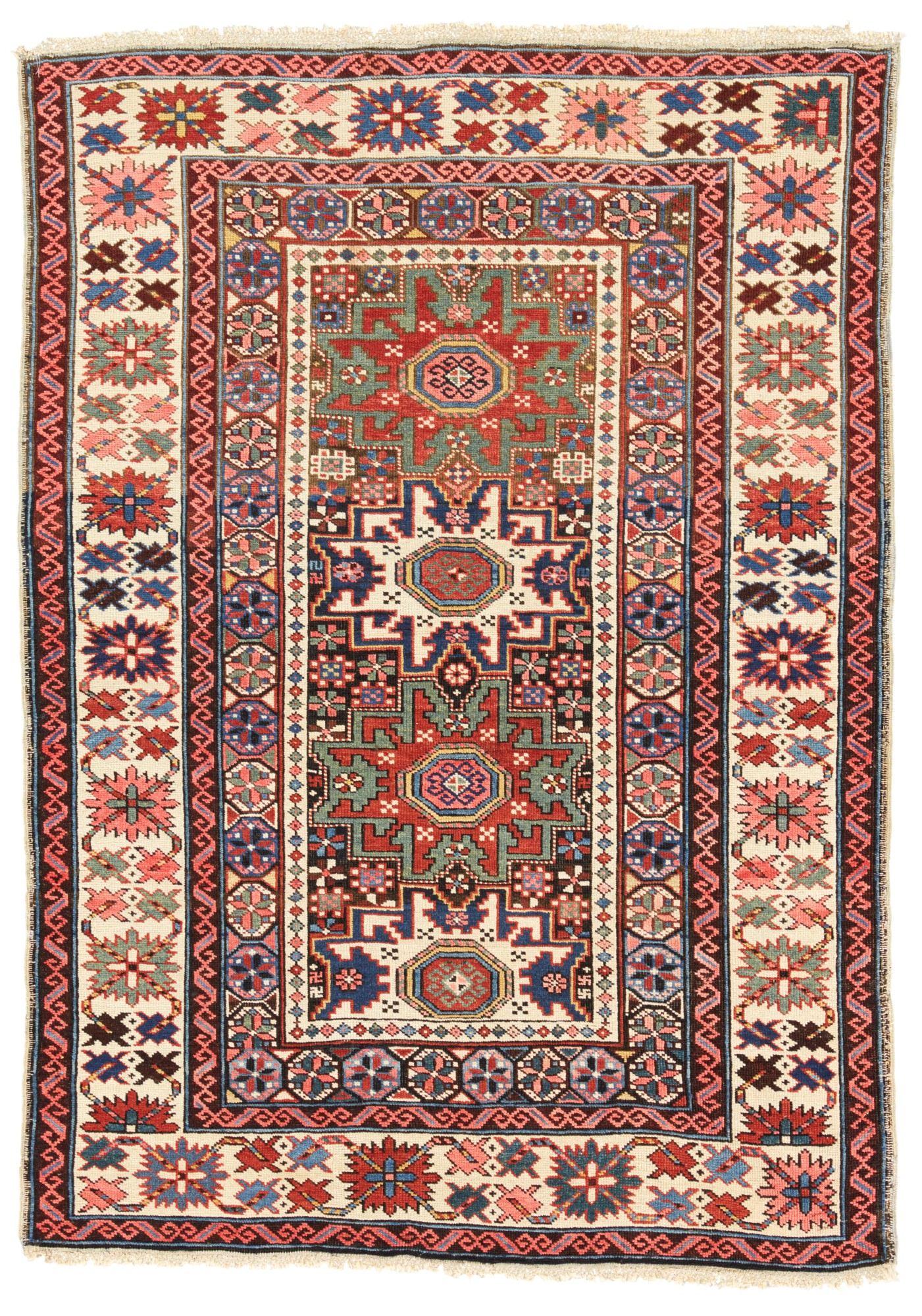
An antique Lesghi rug, east Caucasus, c. 1880

Epic-historical songs about wars are popular among Lezghins, Best-known are the ballads "Shamil atana"(about Imam Shamil) and "Kiri Buba." (about a Lezgin abrek). In the second half of the nineteenth century and the beginning of the twentieth, Lezgin culture and literature underwent a culture significantly influence Azerbaijan. First Lezgin theater originated in 1906 in the village of Akhty. In 1935, based on the semi-professional team was created Lezgin State Music and Drama Theatre named after S. Stalsky. In 1998, the State Lezgin theater was opened in Azerbaijan, located in Qusar.

== Demographics ==
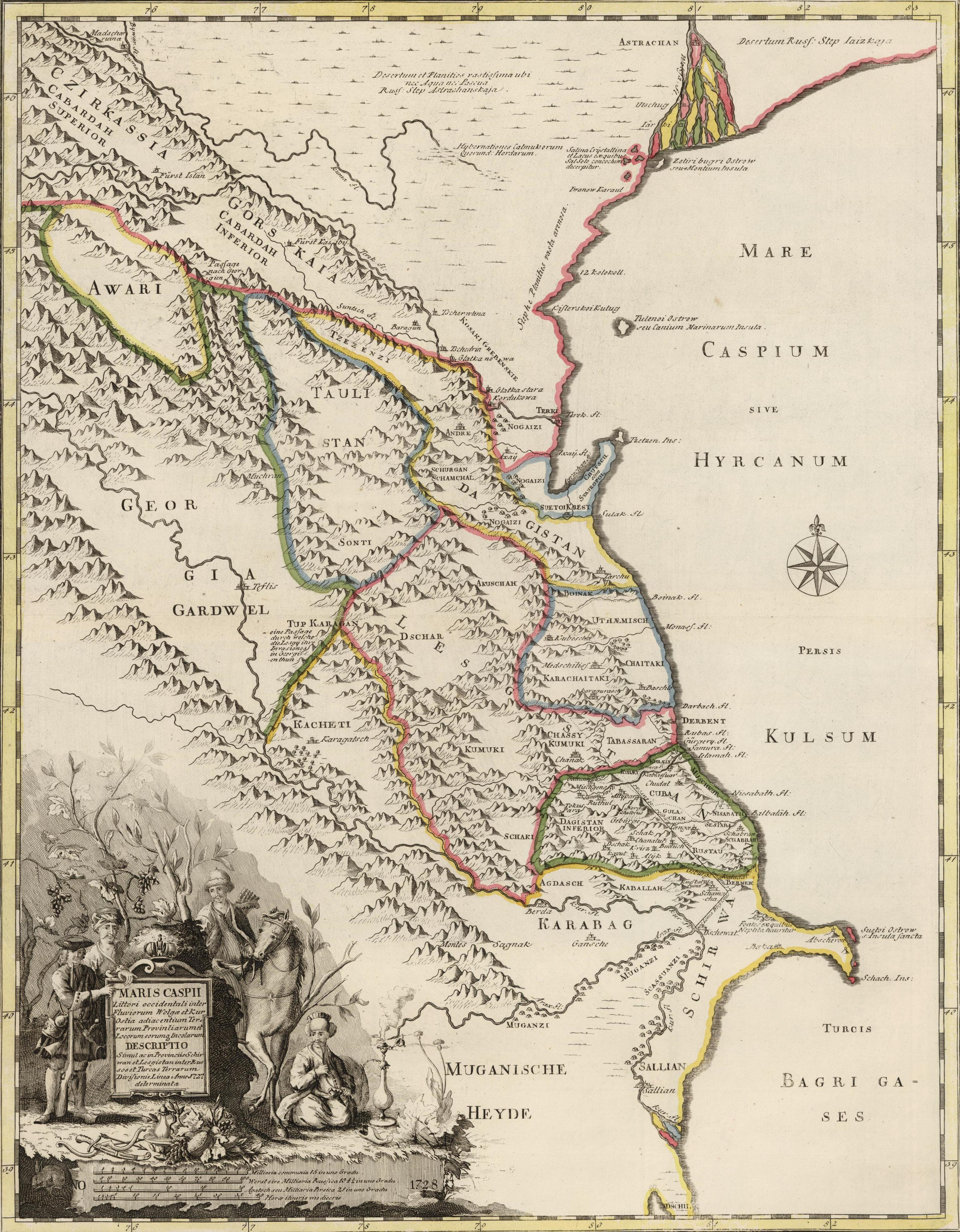
Lezgistan from map of the Caucasus by Johann Gustav Gaerber (1728)

The Lezgins inhabit a compact territory that straddles the border area of southern Dagestan and northern Azerbaijan. It lies, for the most part, in the southeastern portion of Dagestan in (Akhtynsky District, Dokuzparinsky District, Suleyman-Stalsky District, Kurakhsky District, Magaramkentsky District, Khivsky District, Derbentsky District and Rutulsky District) and contiguous northeastern Azerbaijan (in Kuba, Qusar, Qakh, Khachmaz, Oguz, Qabala, Nukha, and Ismailli districts).

The Lezgin territories are divided into two physiographic zones: a region of high, rugged mountains and the piedmont (foothills). Most of the Lezgin territory is in the mountainous zone, where a number of peaks (like Baba Dagh) reach over 3,500 meters in elevation. There are deep and isolated canyons and gorges formed by the tributaries of the Samur and Gulgeri Chai rivers. In the mountainous zones the summers are very hot and dry, with drought conditions a constant threat. There are few trees in this region aside from those in the deep canyons and along the streams themselves. Drought-resistant shrubs and weeds dominate the natural flora. The winters here are frequently windy and brutally cold. In this zone the Lezgins engaged primarily in animal husbandry (mostly sheep and goats) and in craft industries.

In the extreme east of the Lezgin territory, where the mountains give way to the narrow coastal plain of the Caspian Sea, and to the far south, in Azerbaijan, are the foothills. This region has relatively mild, very dry winters and hot, dry summers. Trees are few here also. In this region animal husbandry and artisanry were supplemented by some agriculture (along the alluvial deposits near the rivers).

Lezgins live mainly in Azerbaijan and Russia (Dagestan). The total population is believed to be around 700,000, with 474,000 living in Russia. In Azerbaijan, the government census counts 180,300. However, Lezgin national organizations mention 600,000 to 900,000, the disparity being that many Lezgins claim Azeri nationality to escape job and education discrimination in Azerbaijan. Despite the assimilationist policy of the Azeri government, the Lezgin population is undoubtedly greater than it appears.

As Svante Cornell adds;

Whereas officially the number of Lezgins registered as such in Azerbaijan is around 180,000, the Lezgins claim that the number of Lezgins registered as Azerbaijan is many times higher than this figure, some accounts showing over 700,000 Lezgins in Azerbaijan. These figures are denied by the Azerbaijani government, but in private many Azeris acknowledge the fact that the Lezgins—and for that matter the Talysh or the Kurdish—population is far higher than the official figures.

Lezgins also live in Central Asia, mainly due to Stalin's deportation policies.

== Status ==
=== Azerbaijan ===
Lezgins are, "generally speaking", well integrated into the society of Azerbaijan. Mixed marriages are furthermore common. Lastly, Lezgins in Azerbaijan have a better level of education compared to their kin in Dagestan.

In 1992 a Lezgin organization named Sadval was established to promote Lezgin rights. Sadval campaigned for the redrawing of the Russian–Azerbaijani border to allow for the creation of a single Lezgin state encompassing areas in Russia and Azerbaijan where Lezgins were compactly settled. In Azerbaijan, a more moderate organization called Samur was formed, advocating more cultural autonomy for Lezgins in Azerbaijan.

Lezgins traditionally suffered from unemployment and a shortage of land. A major consequence of the outbreak of the war in First Chechen War in 1994 was the closure of the border between Russia and Azerbaijan: as a result, the Lezgins were for the first time in their history separated by an international border restricting their movement.

The high tide of Lezgin mobilization in Azerbaijan appeared to have passed towards the end of the 1990s. Sadval was banned by the Azerbaijani authorities after official allegations that it was involved in the 1994 Baku Metro bombings. The end of the Karabakh war, and Lezgin resistance to forced conscription, deprived the movement of a key issue on which to mobilize. In 1998 Sadval split into ‘moderate’ and ‘radical’ wings, following which it appeared to lose much of its popularity on both sides of the Russian–Azerbaijani border.

Lezgins expressed concern over underrepresentation in the Azerbaijani Parliament (Milli Meclis) after a shift away from proportional representation in the parliamentary elections of November 2005. Lezgins had been represented by two members of parliament in the previous parliament, but are now represented by only one.

Lezgins state that they face discrimination and that they feel forced to assimilate into Azeri identity to avoid economic and education discrimination. Therefore, the real number of Lezgins may be significantly higher than presented in censuses.

Lezgin is taught as a foreign language in areas where many Lezgins are settled, but teaching resources are scarce. Lezgin textbooks come from Russia and are not adapted to local conditions. Although Lezgin newspapers are available, Lezgins have also expressed concern over the disappearance of their rich oral tradition. The only Lezgin television broadcasting available in Azerbaijan is that received over the border from Russia.

In March 2006 Azerbaijani media reported that Sadval had formed an 'underground' terrorist unit carrying out operations in Dagestan. Security forces across the border in Dagestan in Russia, responded skeptically to these reports having found no evidence.

=== Dagestan ===
According to reports Lezgins in Dagestan suffer disproportionately from unemployment, with unemployment rates in Lezgin-populated areas of southern Dagestan twice the republic average of 32 percent. This may be one contributory factor to renewed calls from within the Sadval movement in January 2006 for a redrawing of the Russian-Azerbaijani border to incorporate Lezgin-populated areas of southern Dagestan within Azerbaijan.

In March 1999 another organization, the Federal Lezgin National Cultural Autonomy, was established as an extraterritorial movement advocating cultural autonomy for Lezgins.

== Genetics ==
According to a genetic study in 2023, the following haplogroups are found to predominate among Lezgins:

- J1 (63%)
- R1b (13%)
- I1 (9%)
- G2 (7%)
- J2 (6%)
- E1b1b (3%)

Modern-day Lezgins speak Northeast Caucasian languages that have been spoken in the region before the introduction of Indo-European languages. They are closely related, both culturally and linguistically, to the Aghuls of southern Dagestan and, somewhat more distantly, to the Tsakhurs, Rutuls, and Tabasarans (the northern neighbors of the Lezgins). Also related, albeit more distantly, are the numerically small Jek, Kryts, Shahdagh, Budukh, and Khinalug peoples of northern Azerbaijan. These groups, together with the Lezgins, form the Samur branch of the indigenous Lezgic peoples.

Lezgins are believed to descend partly from people who inhabited the region of southern Dagestan in the Bronze Age. However, there is some DNA evidence of significant admixture during the last 4,000 years with a Central Asian population.

Haplogroup I1 is found nowhere other than Europe (primarily in Scandinavia); therefore, the detection of this haplogroup among the Lezgins suggests a genetic contribution from European populations (Vikings) to the Lezgin gene pool.

== Notable Lezgins ==
- Haji Davud Mushkurvi, Lezgin imam was a prominent 18th-century Lezgin military-religious leader, Sunni scholar, and the first Imam of the Caucasus. He led a major national liberation movement against the Safavid Empire.
- Sheikh Muhammad Yarguvi, was a Lezgin imam, founder of Muridism in the Caucasus and teacher of all imams of Dagestan and Chechnya. Legendary Khas Muhammad Huluhvi and Imam Shamil was his the most famous student.
- Khas Muhammad Huluhvi, Lezgin imam and military leader during the Russo-Caucasian War. Leader of the uprisings in Quba in 1837–1839.
- Ali Hilivi, Lezgin abrek of the uprisings in Quba in 1837–1839.
- Mushab-Ali Kuzunvi, Lezgin imam and military leader, Leader of the uprisings in Qusar in 1930.
- Haddam Chakarvi, Lezgin abrek of the uprisings in Quba in 1930
- Gazi Muhammad Shtulvi, Lezgin imam and military leader, Leader of the uprisings in Shtul in 1930.
- Abdullah Kirivi (Kiri Buba), legendary Lezgin folk hero and abrek
- Suleyman Kerimov (born 1966), oligarch, billionaire and politician
- Nazim Huseynov (born 1969), judoka
- Ikram Aliskerov (born 1992), MMA fighter

== See also ==
- Lezgiwal
- Lezgin language
- Lezginka
- Lezgistan
- North Caucasian people
- Northeast Caucasian people
- Nader's Dagestan campaign
