= Islamic rituals =

Islamic rituals may refer to:

== Common rituals ==
- Aqiqah, Islamic animal sacrifice
- Hajj, Islamic pilgrimage
- Janazah, Islamic funeral
- Khitan, Islamic male circumcision
- Nikah, Islamic marriage
- Salah, Islamic prayer
- Sawm, Islamic fasting
- Shahada, Islamic creed
- Taharah, Islamic ritual purification
- Zakat, Islamic almsgiving

== Other rituals ==
- Eid al-Adha § Observances
- Eid al-Fitr § General rituals
