= Rudolf Otto von Ottenfeld =

Austrian military painter

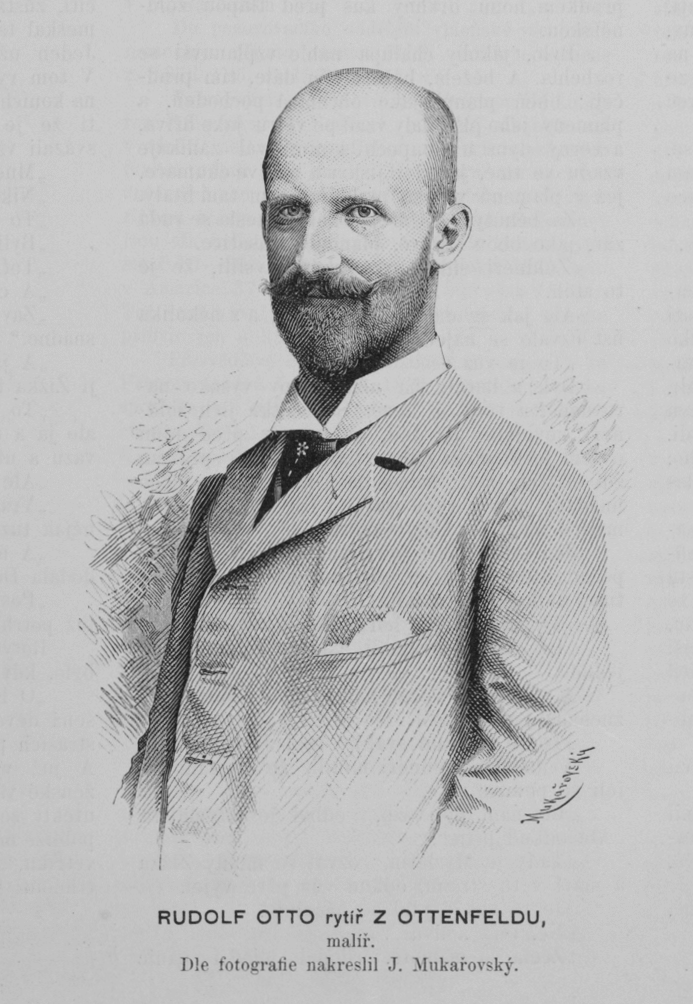
- Portrait of Rudolf Otto von Ottenfeld by Josef Mukařovský, 1890
- Born: 21 July 1856; Verona
- Died: 26 July 1913 (aged 57); Prague
- Education: Academy of Fine Arts, Vienna
- Movement: Military scenes, Orientalist scenes

Rudolf Otto von Ottenfeld (21 July 1856, Verona – 26 July 1913, Prague) was an Austrian military painter, a founding member of the Vienna Secession and a professor at the Academy of Fine Arts, Prague.

== Life ==
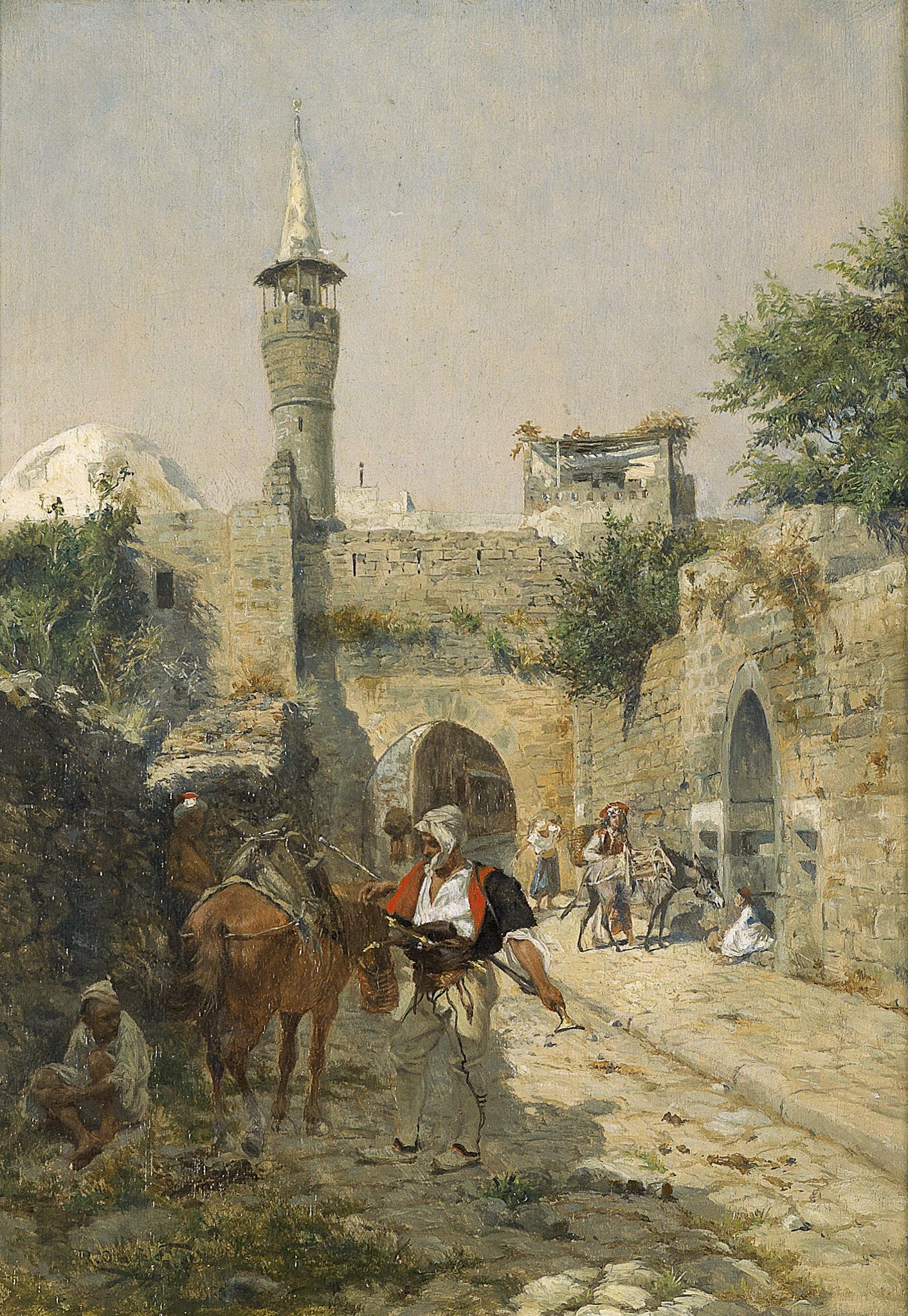
Street scene (1887)

Ottenfeld was a student at the Academy of Fine Arts, Vienna under Carl Wurzinger and Leopold Carl Müller. He lived in Munich in 1883–93 and Vienna in 1893–1900. For the Sixth International Art Exhibition in Munich in 1892, he was selected as a juror. Ottenfeld's illustrations in a history of the Austrian army between 1700 and 1867 in 1895, which became a standard reference work on uniforms in the period.

He was a founding member of the Vienna Secession and sat on the Secession's working committee. The title page of the fourth issue of Ver Sacrum, the official journal of the Secession, was designed by Ottenfeld. After the death of Julius Mařák in 1899, Ottenfeld was appointed to the Academy of Fine Arts, Prague. Among his students in Prague was the painter and art restorer Zdeněk Glückselig. He spent thirteen years there as a professor, until his death.

== Style ==
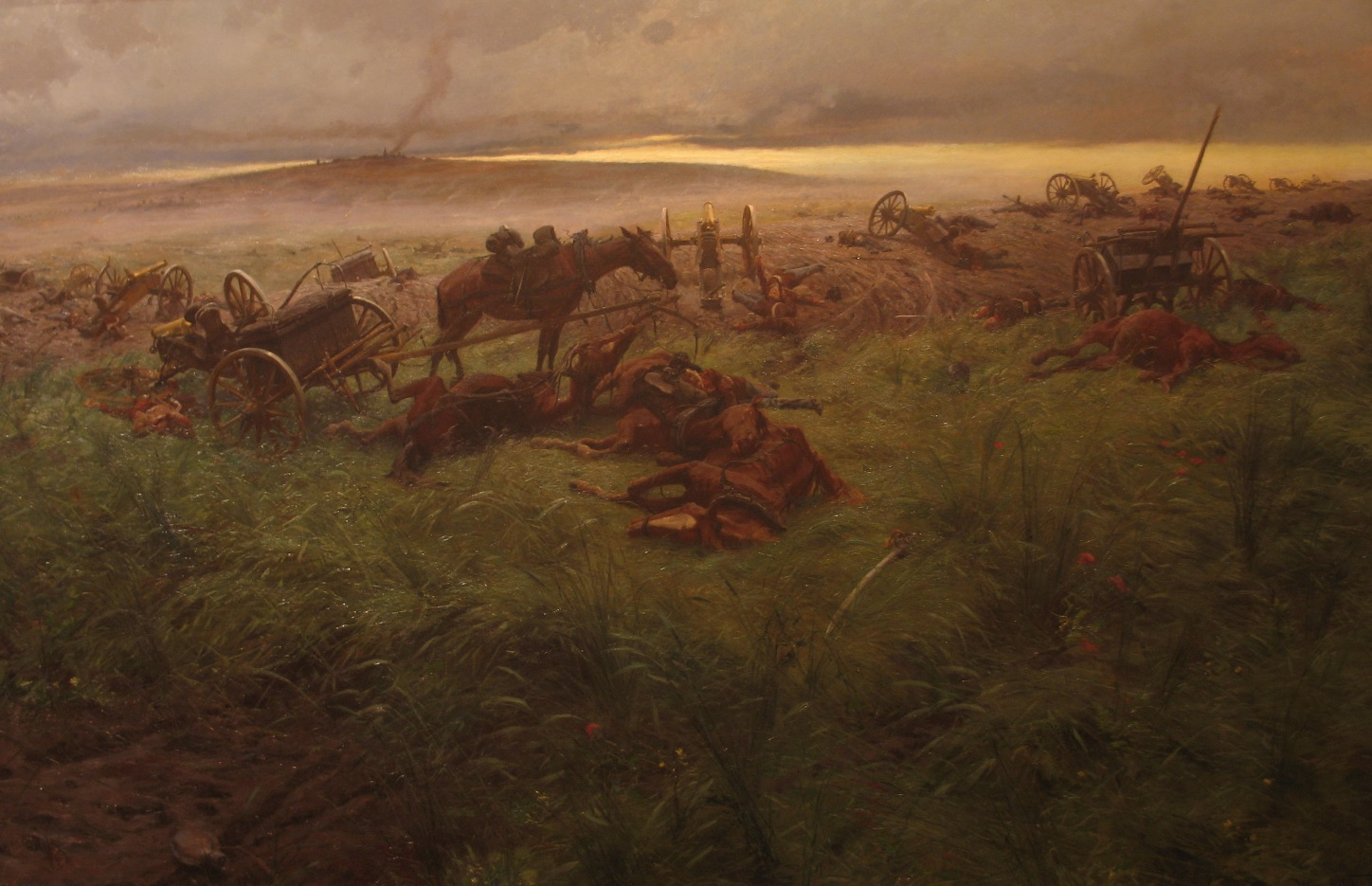
A glorious chapter for the Austrian artillery. The army artillery reserve after the battle of Hradec Králové on the 3rd of July 1866. (1897)

Ottenfeld was noted as a creator of military art in Vienna. He painted several battle scenes, as well as soldiers in uniform, with a historical context.

== Awards ==
- Lesser Gold Medal, Third International Art Exhibition in Vienna, 1894
- Lesser Gold Medal, International Art Exhibition in Berlin, 1896
- Second Class Medal, Antwerp, 1894 World Exhibition

== Selected exhibitions ==
- Christmas Exhibition in Vienna, 1891, Montenegrins in Flight
- Third International Art Exhibition in Vienna, 1894, Archduke Charles allows the transfer of the corpse of the French General Marçeau to the French forces (21 September 1796)
- Exhibition of the Graz Künstlerbund, 1904

== Selected works ==
- A glorious chapter for the Austrian artillery. The army artillery reserve after the battle of Hradec Králové on the 3rd of July 1866. Oil on canvas, 1897, 194 x 289 cm, Museum of Military History, Vienna.
- Occupation campaign in Bosnia in 1878. Austrian troops cross a pass in Bosnia. Oil on wood, 1878, Museum of Military History, Vienna.
- Grenzer sniper and infantry in 1798. Oil on cardboard, 1896, Museum of Military History, Vienna.

== See also ==
- List of Orientalist artists
- Orientalism

== Bibliography ==
- Teuber, Oskar; Dolleczek, Anton; Alfred Frh. v. Koudelka [Kondelka] (1895). Die österreiche Armee von 1700 bis 1867. Illustrirt [sic] von Rudolf von Ottenfeld. Wien: Verlag von Emil Berté & Cie. und S. Czeiger.
