= Anas Pshikhachev =

Russian Muslim leader

Haji Anas Pshikhachev
- Анас Пшихачев; Пщыхакӏ Iэнэс

Personal life
- Born: 11 December 1967 Nalchik, Kabardino-Balkar ASSR, RSFSR, Soviet Union
- Died: 15 December 2010 (aged 43) Nalchik, Kabardino-Balkaria, Russia
- Cause of death: Gunshot wound
- Children: 3
- Occupation: Construction technician; Islamic scholar

Religious life
- Religion: Islam
- Denomination: Sunni
- School: Hanafi
- Creed: Maturidi

Muslim leader
- Post: Head of the Spiritual Administration of the Muslims of Kabardino-Balkaria
- Period in office: 22 April 2004 – 15 December 2010
- Predecessor: Shafig Pshikhachev
- Successor: Khazrataliy Dzasezhev
- Military career
- Allegiance: Soviet Union
- Branch: Soviet Army
- Service years: 1985–1987

Haji Anas Musayevich Pshikhachev (p-she-KAH-chev, Russian: Анас Мусаевич Пшихачев; Kabardian: Пщыхакӏ Iэнэс, Мусэ и къуэ; 11 December 1967 – 15 December 2010) was a Russian Muslim religious figure of Circassian ethnicity who served as Head of the Spiritual Administration of the Muslims of Kabardino-Balkaria from April 2004 until his assassination in December 2010.

RIA Novosti referred to him as one of the most influential Muslim religious figures of the North Caucasus.

== Early life and education ==
Pshikhachev was born to a worker family in Nalchik, Soviet Kabardino-Balkaria on 11 December 1967. From 1975 to 1977, he studied at the 17th Volny Aul middle school, and from 1977 to 1983, he was at the 11th Nalchik school.

From 1983, he studied at the Nalchik workers tekhnikum, and from 1985 to 1987, he served in the Soviet Army. In 1989, he finished his studies, becoming a construction technician.

From 1991 to 1994, he studied at the Arabic Language and Islamic Sciences Institute in Damascus, Syria, and at the Islamic Call Tripoli International Islamic University until 1998.

== Career ==
From 1989 to 1991, Pshikhachev worked as the imam of Chyornaya Rechka, Urvansky District, Kabardino-Balkaria. From September 1998, he taught at the Kabardino-Balkar Islamic Institute. In 1999, he was appointed the deputy director of the institute.

In April 2004, Pshikhachev was appointed Head of the Spiritual Administration of the Muslims of Kabardino-Balkaria. He served in the position until his death on 15 December 2010. At some point, he was also the Chairman of the Muslim Board of Kabardino-Balkaria.

Pshikhachev was an author of 50 theological and judicial monographies.

== Assassination ==
According to the Investigative Committee of the Prosecutor-General's Office of Russia in Kabardino-Balkaria, on 15 December 2010, at approximately 19:30 MSK, two unknown men have called Pshikhachev from his home on Yesenin Street, 2A and shot him to death. At least four 9mm caliber shell casings were found at the scene. The assassins were later identified as Nalchik residents Astimir Mamishev and Azparukh Shamaev.

Head of the Chechen Republic Ramzan Kadyrov was "shaken" by the assassination and called it "a blow to the face of all the leaders of the North Caucasus regions". He blamed it on terrorism and religious extremism. President of Russia Dmitry Medvedev expressed his condolences as well.

== Personal life ==
Pshikhachev was married and had 3 children.
