= Ethnic groups in the Caucasus =

Map of ethno-linguistic groups inhabiting the Caucasus (Armenia, Azerbaijan, Georgia, and Russia) in 2007. Classifications split into Caucasian, Indo-European, and Altaic.

The Caucasus is a region located partly in Eastern Europe and partly in Western Asia, spanning Armenia, Azerbaijan, Georgia, and southern Russia. Bounded by the Black Sea and the Caspian Sea, it includes the Caucasus Mountains, which serve as a natural boundary between Europe and Asia.

Tens of millions of people across more than 50 ethnic groups reside in the Caucasus. There are four language families with a historic presence in the region: Caucasian, Indo-European, and Turkic and Mongolic (i.e., Altaic).

== By language family ==
=== Caucasian ===
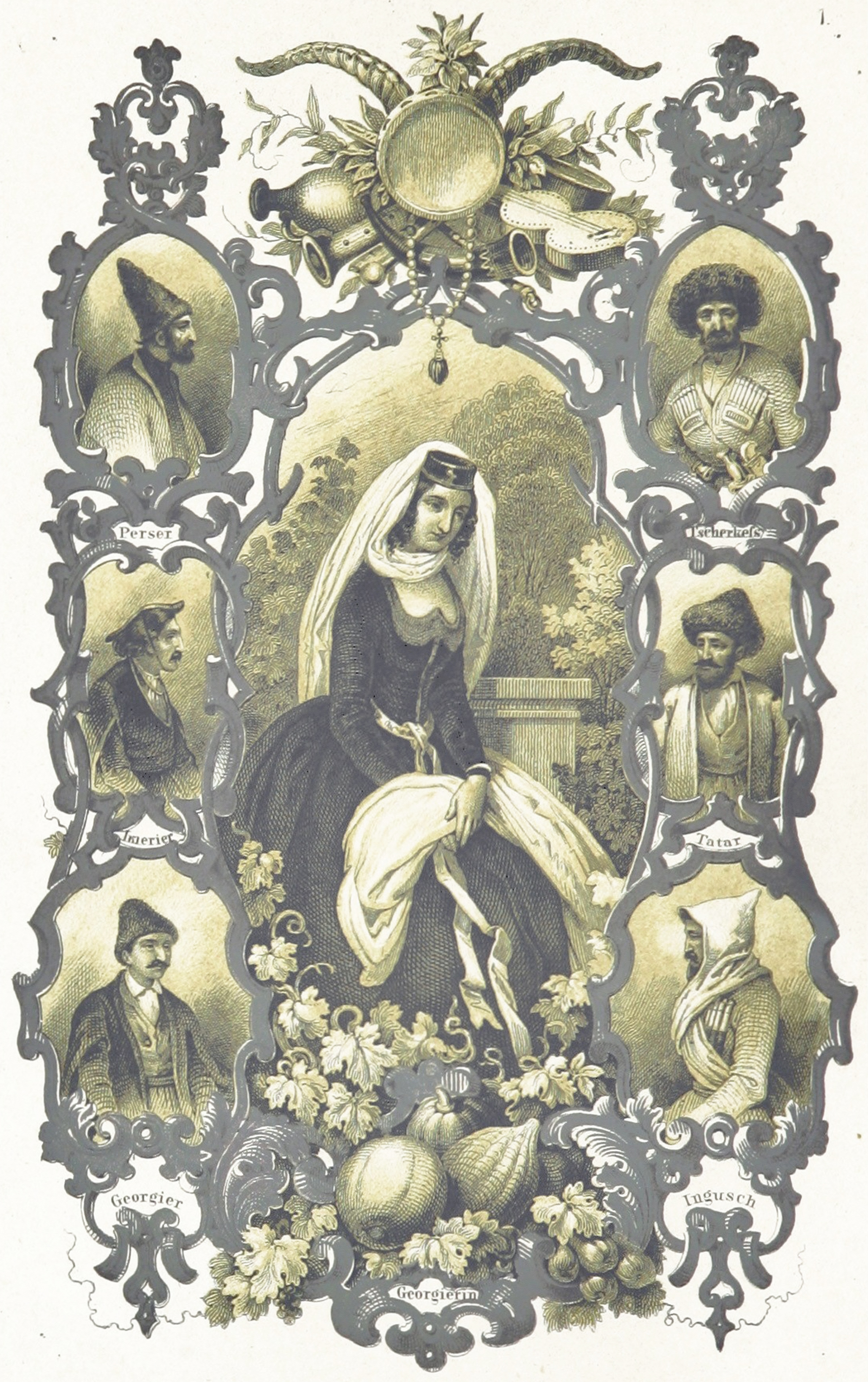
Caucasian peoples: Georgians, Persians (in Azerbaijan), Circassians, Tatars (Azerbaijanis), and Ingush

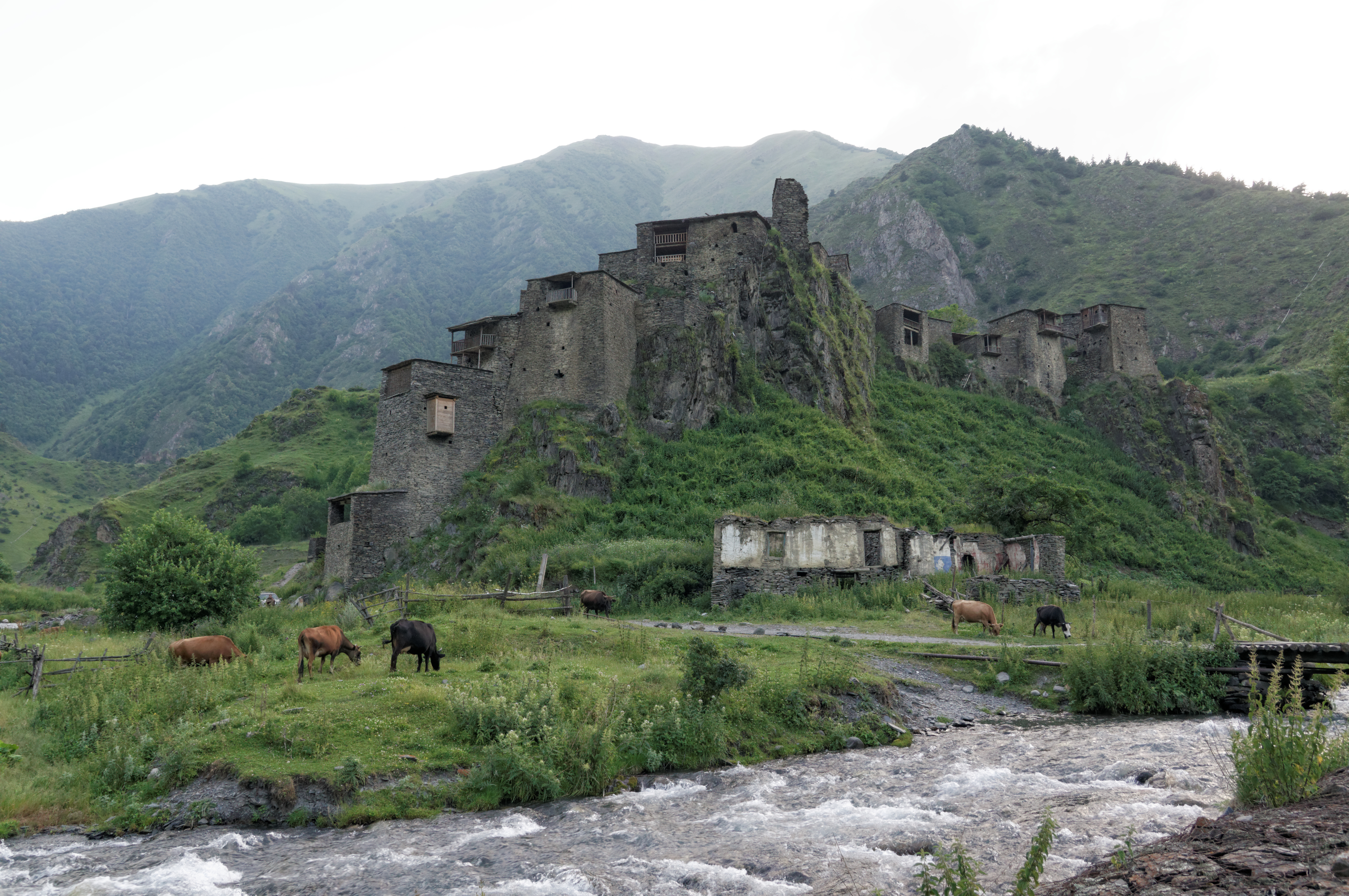
The medieval Georgian village of Shatili

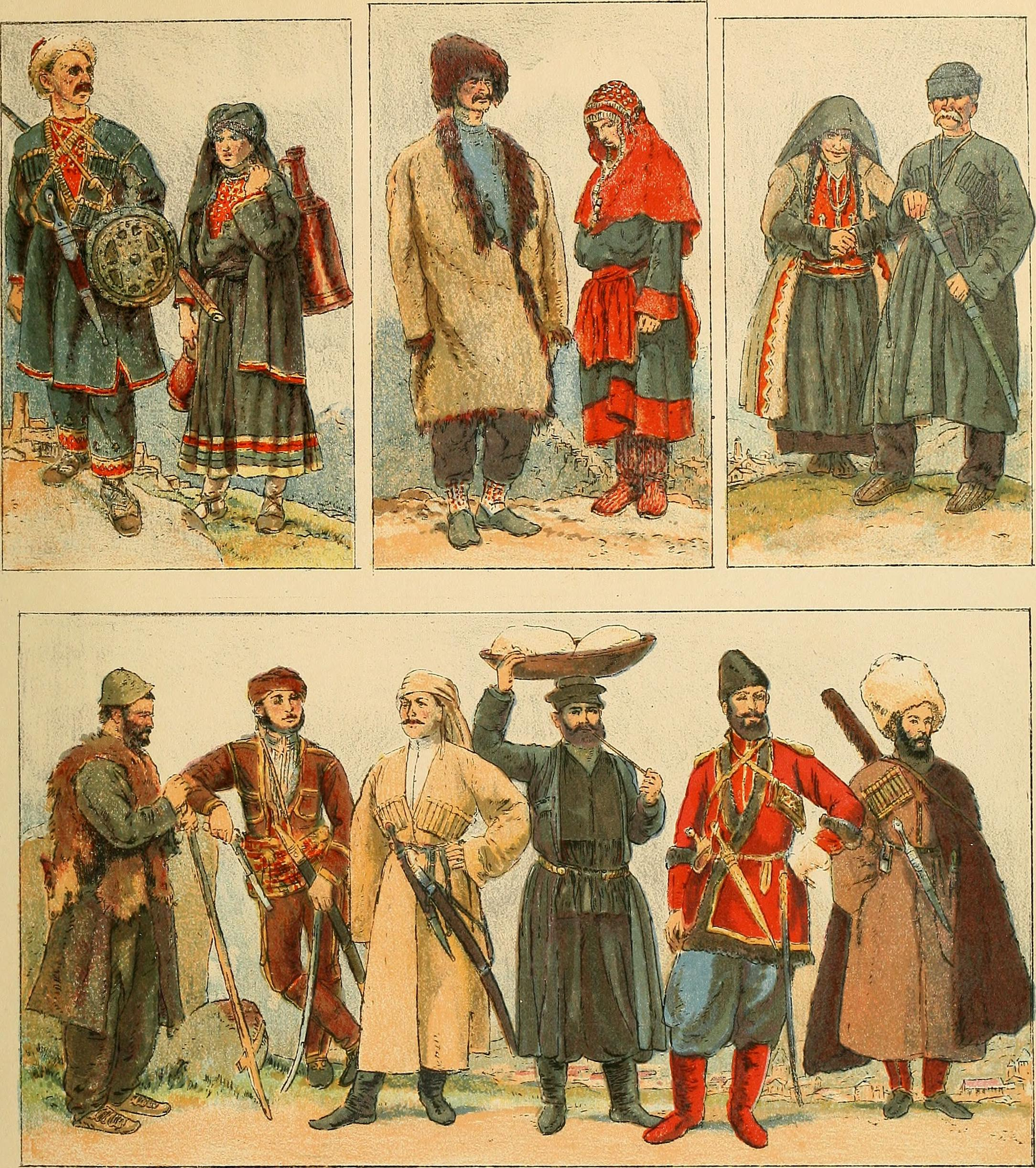
Ethnic groups inhabiting the Caucasus region

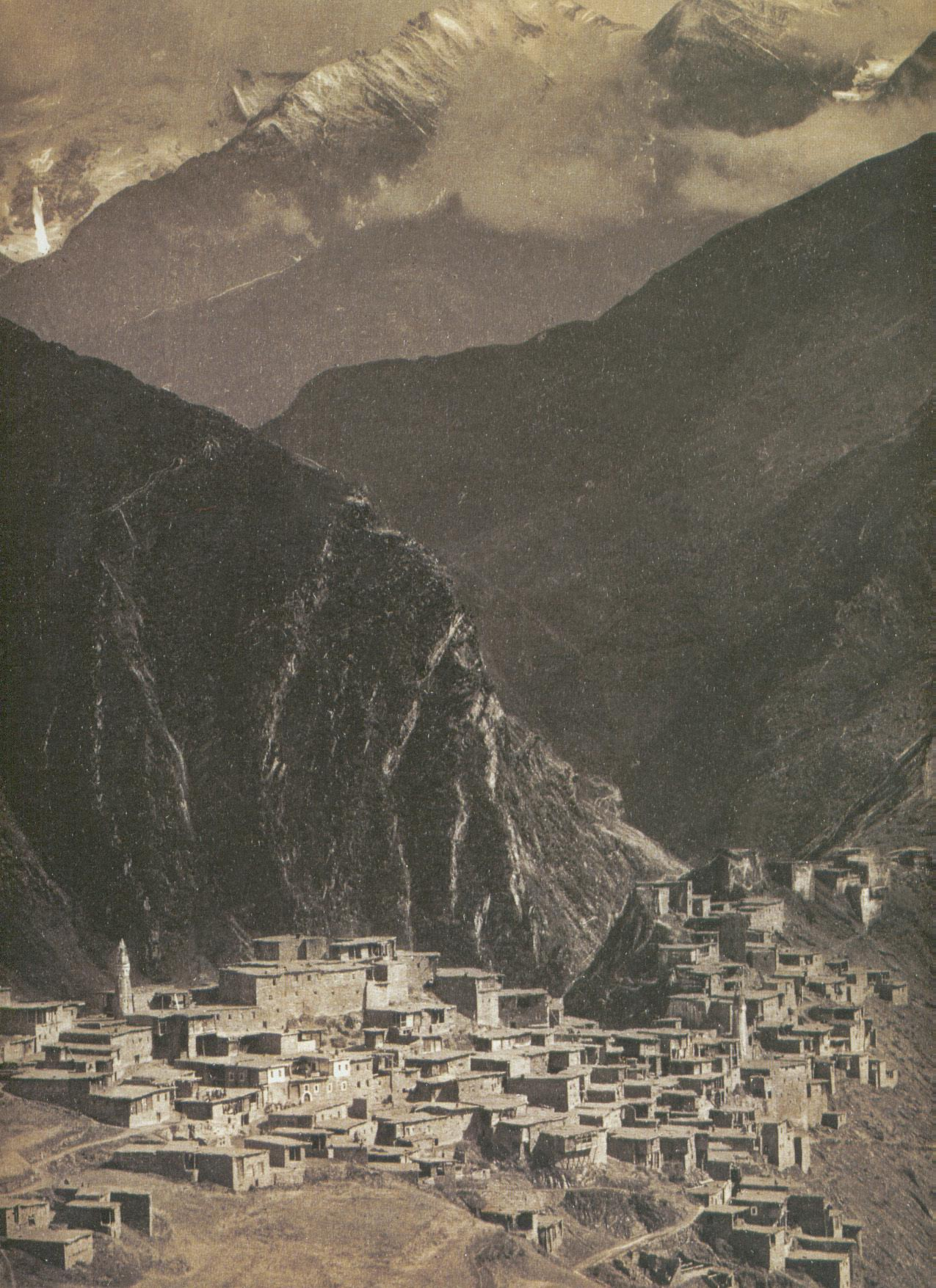
The village of Tindi, in Dagestan, in the late 1890s

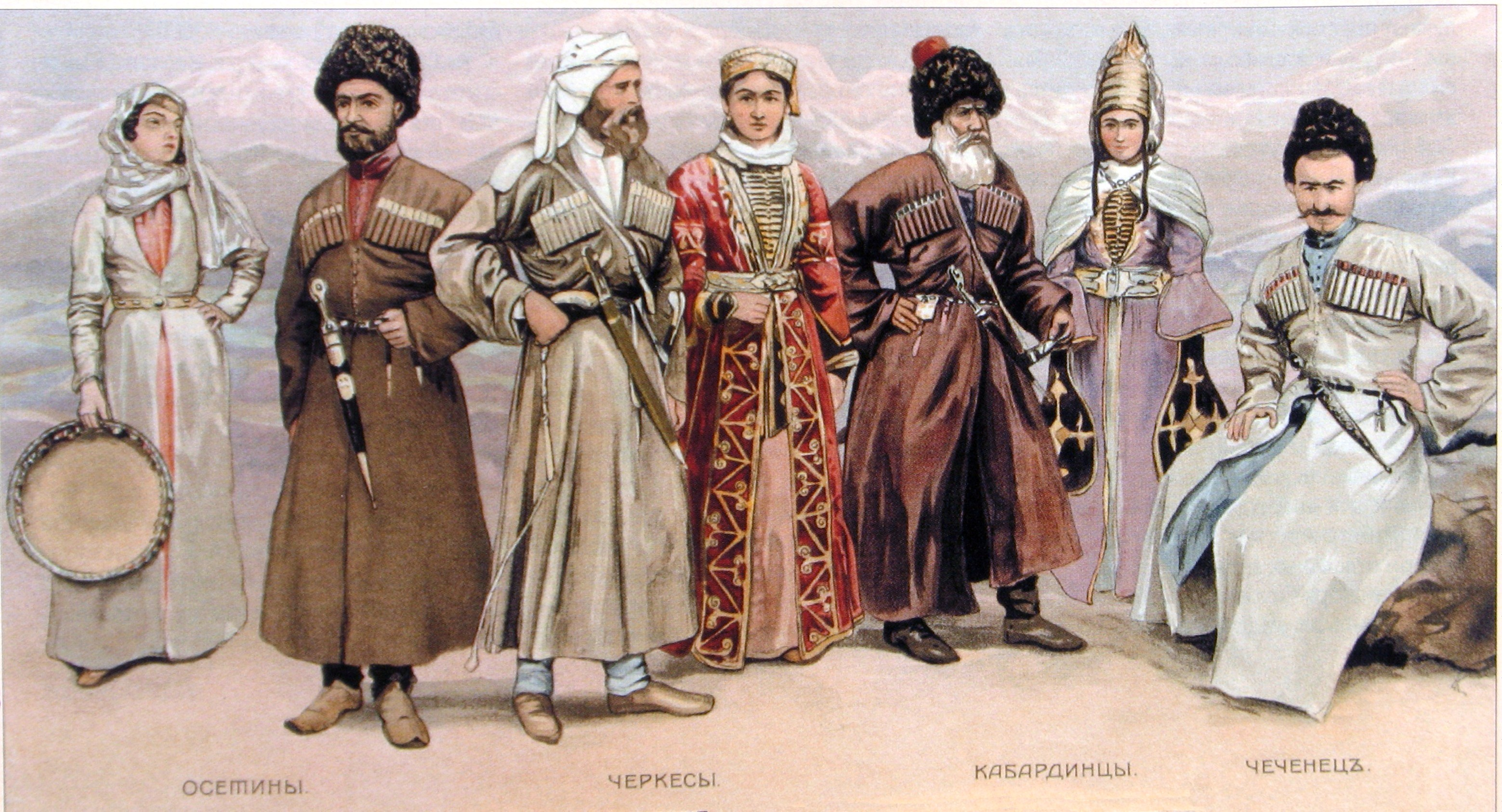
North Caucasian peoples (from left to right): Ossetians, Circassians, Kabardians, and a Chechen

Caucasians who speak languages which have long been indigenous to the region are generally classified into three groups: Kartvelian peoples, Northeast Caucasian peoples and Northwest Caucasian peoples.

Kartvelian languages

- Georgians
  - Zans
    - Lazs
    - Mingrelians
  - Svans
  - Dvals

Northeast Caucasian languages

- Avar–Andic peoples:
  - Andis
  - Akhvakhs
  - Avars
  - Bagvalals
  - Botlikhs
  - Chamalals
  - Godoberis
  - Karatas
  - Tindis
- Dargins
  - Dargwa
  - Kaitags
  - Kubachins
  - Itsari
  - Chirag
- Khinalugs
- Laks
- Lezgic peoples:
  - Aguls
  - Archin
  - Budukhs
  - Jeks
  - Kryts
  - Lezgins
  - Rutuls
  - Tabasarans
  - Tsakhurs
  - Udis
- Nakh peoples:
  - Arshtins
  - Bats
  - Chechens
    - Kists
  - Ingush
- Tsezic (Didoic) peoples:
  - Bezhtas
  - Hinukhs
  - Hunzibs
  - Khwarshis
  - Tsez

Northwest Caucasian languages

- Abazins
- Abkhazians
- Circassians
  - Abzakhs
  - Besleneys
  - Bzhedugs
  - Chemirgoys
  - Kabardians
  - Natukhajs
  - Shapsugs
  - Ubykhs

The largest peoples speaking languages which belong to the Caucasian language families and who are currently resident in the Caucasus are the Georgians (3,200,000), the Chechens (2,000,000), the Avars (1,200,000), the Lezgins (about 1,000,000) and the Kabardians (600,000), while outside the Caucasus, the largest people of Caucasian origin, in diaspora in more than 40 countries (such as Jordan, Turkey, the countries of Europe, Syria, and the United States) are the Circassians with about 3,000,000-5,000,000 speakers. Georgians are the only Caucasian people who have their own undisputedly independent state—Georgia. Abkhazia's status is disputed. Other Caucasian peoples have republics within Russia: Adyghe (Adygea), Cherkess (Karachay-Cherkessia), Kabardians (Kabardino-Balkaria), Ingush (Ingushetia), Chechens (Chechnya), while other Northeast Caucasian peoples mostly live in Dagestan.

=== Indo-European ===
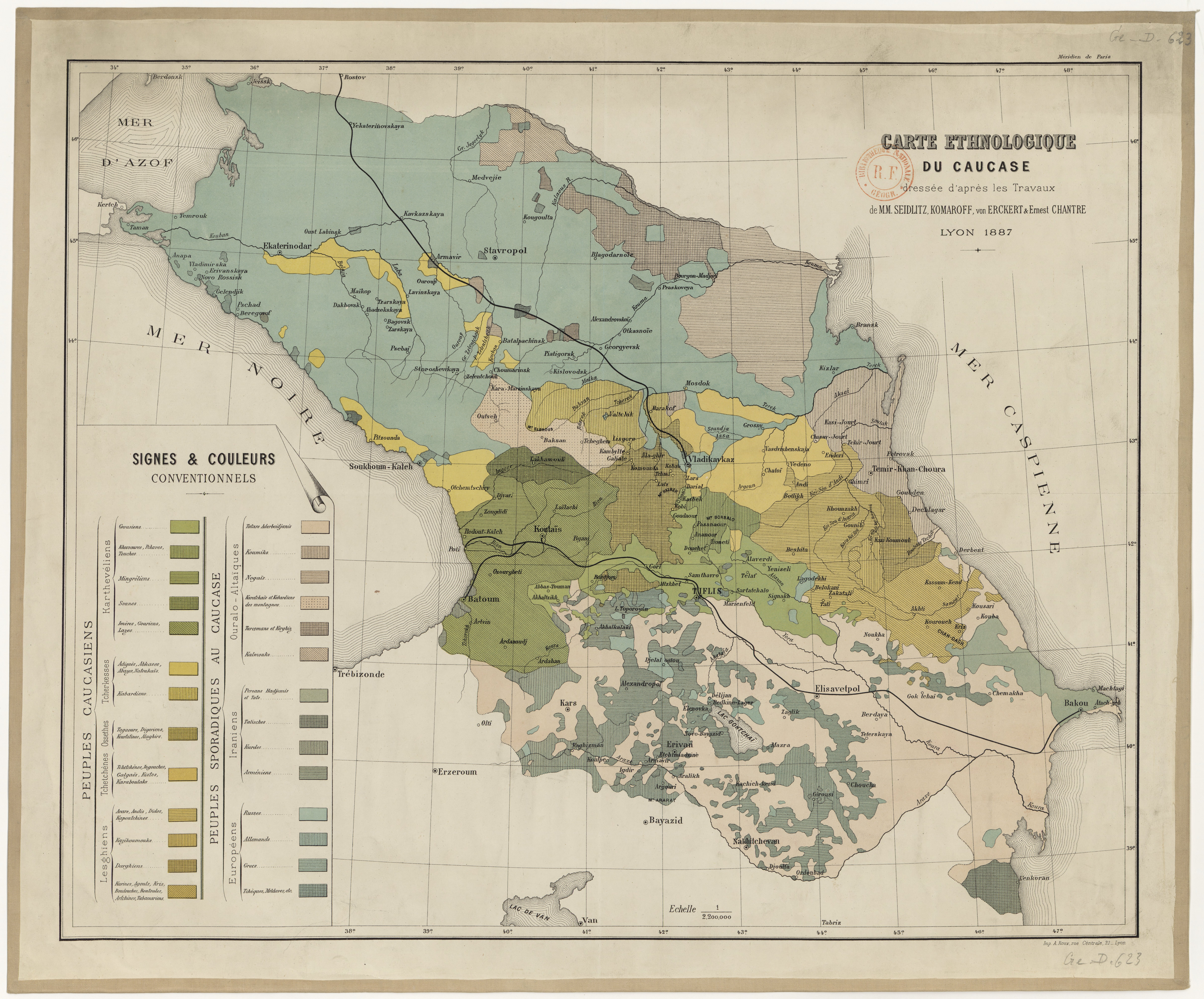
Ethnolinguistic groups in the Caucasus region in 1887

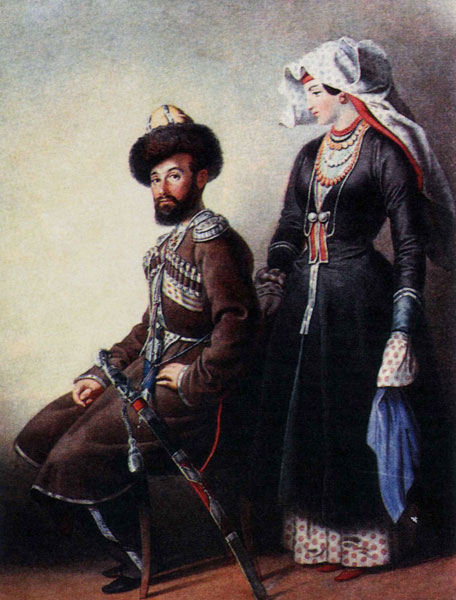
Terek Cossacks of the North Caucasus

Caucasians that speak languages belonging to the Indo-European language family:

- Armenians
  - Armeno-Tats
  - Cherkesogai
  - Zoks
- Germans
- Hellenic group:
  - Caucasus Greeks
  - Pontic Greeks
- Indo-Aryan group:
  - Loms
- Iranian group:
  - Ossetians
    - Digors
    - Irons
  - Talysh
  - Tats
  - Kurds
  - Yazidis
- Latins†, including Romance language speakers
- Slavic group:
  - Poles, particularly in Armenia, Azerbaijan and Georgia
  - Russians, including Cossacks and Spiritual Christians
  - Ukrainians, particularly in Armenia and Kuban

†Mostly descended from Genoese Catholic settlers of the Late Middle Ages.

Armenians number 3,215,800 in their native Armenia, though approximately 8 million live outside the republic, forming the Armenian diaspora. Elsewhere in the region, they reside in Georgia (primarily Samtskhe–Javakheti, Tbilisi, and Abkhazia), and the Russian North Caucasus. The Ossetians live in North Ossetia–Alania (an autonomous republic within Russia) and in South Ossetia, which is de facto independent, but is de jure part of Georgia. The Yazidis reside in the western areas of Armenia, mostly in the Aragatsotn marz, and in the eastern areas of Georgia. An autonomous Kurdish region was created in 1923 in Soviet Azerbaijan but was later abolished in 1929. Pontic Greeks reside in Armenia (Lori Province, especially in Alaverdi) and Georgia (Kvemo Kartli, Adjara, the Tsalka, and Abkhazia). Pontic Greeks had also made up a significant component of the South Caucasus region acquired from the Ottoman Empire (following the 1878 Treaty of San Stefano) that centred on the town of Kars (ceded back to Turkey in 1916). Russians mostly live in the Russian North Caucasus and their largest concentration is in Stavropol Krai, Krasnodar Krai, and Adygea. Georgia and the former Russian South Caucasus province of Kars Oblast was also home to a significant minority of ethnic (Swabian) Germans, although their numbers have become depleted as a result of deportations (to Kazakhstan following World War II), immigration to Germany, and assimilation into indigenous communities.

=== Turkic ===
Caucasians that speak languages belonging to the Turkic language family:

- Kipchaks:
  - Kumyks
  - Balkars
  - Karachays
  - Nogais
- Oghuz Turks:
  - Azerbaijanis
  - Meskhetian Turks
  - Karapapakhs

The largest of the Turkic-speaking peoples in the Caucasus are Azerbaijanis who number 8,700,000 in the Republic of Azerbaijan. In the Caucasus region, they live in Georgia, Russia (Dagestan), Turkey and previously in Armenia (before 1990). The total number of Azerbaijanis is around 35 million (15 million in Iran). Other Turkic speakers live in their autonomous republics within Russia: Karachays (Karachay-Cherkessia), Balkars (Kabardino-Balkaria), while Kumyks and Nogais live in Dagestan.

=== Mongolic ===
- Kalmyks

The Kalmyks is the name given to the Oirats, western Mongols in Russia, whose ancestors migrated from Dzungaria in 1607. Today they form a majority in the autonomous republic of Kalmykia on the western shore of the Caspian Sea. Kalmykia has Europe's only Buddhist government.

=== Semitic ===
Caucasians that speak languages belonging to the Semitic language family:

- Assyrians in the Caucasus number approximately 35,000 people, and live in Armenia, Georgia, Azerbaijan and southern Russia. There are up to 15,000 in Georgia, 5000 in Armenia, up to 15,000 in southern Russian regions of the Caucasus and 1400 in Azerbaijan. They descend from the ancient Mesopotamians and are indigenous to what is today Iraq, Northeastern Syria, Northwestern Iran, and Southeastern Turkey. They are Eastern Rite Christians, mainly followers of the Assyrian Church of the East, and speak and write Mesopotamian Eastern Aramaic dialects.
- Caucasus Jews of two sub-ethnic groups Mountain Jews and Georgian Jews. There are about 15,000–30,000 Caucasus Jews (as 140,000 immigrated to Israel, and 40,000 to the United States).
- Arabs in the Caucasus: a population of nomadic Arabs was reported in 1728 as having rented winter pastures near the Caspian shores of the Mugan plain (in present-day Azerbaijan). In 1888, an unknown number of Arabs still lived in the Baku Governorate of the Russian Empire. As well as descendants of Sayyid and Siddiqui – the people with Arabian origin, but mostly assimilated by other Caucasian peoples. However, some people identify not just as Sayyid or Siddiqui with non-Arabian ethnicity, but as Arabs.

== By population ==
Ethnicities of the Caucasus by population
Name	Total population	Region	Group	Languages	Subgroup	Religion
Mingrelians	288,000	Samegrelo	Kartvelians	Mingrelian	Zans	Orthodox Christianity
Lazs	750000–1500000	Lazistan	Kartvelians	Laz	Zans	Sunni Islam
Svans	30,000	Svaneti	Kartvelians	Svan	Svans	Orthodox Christianity
Georgians	5000000	Georgia	Kartvelians	Georgian	Georgians	Orthodox Christianity
Ingiloys	14,900	Saingilo (Hereti)	Kartvelians	Ingiloan dialect	Georgians	Sunni Islam
Meskhetians	77,498	Samtskhe	Kartvelians	Meskhetian dialect	Georgians	Orthodox Christianity
Gurians	104,338	Guria	Kartvelians	Gurian dialect	Georgians	Orthodox Christianity
Tushs	30,000	Tusheti	Kartvelians	Tushetian dialect	Georgians	Orthodox Christianity
Rachians	52,000	Racha	Kartvelians	Racha dialect	Georgians	Orthodox Christianity
Pshavs	30,000	Pshavia	Kartvelians	Pshavian dialect	Georgians	Orthodox Christianity
Mokhevians	7,000	Khevi	Kartvelians	Khevi dialect	Georgians	Orthodox Christianity
Khevsurians	10,000	Khevsureti	Kartvelians	Khevsur dialect	Georgians	Orthodox Christianity
Kakhetians	500,000	Kakheti	Kartvelians	Kakheti dialect	Georgians	Orthodox Christianity
Imeretians	400,000–600,000	Imereti	Kartvelians	Imeretian dialect	Georgians	Orthodox Christianity
Javakhians	5,000	Javakheti	Kartvelians	Javakhian dialect	Georgians	Orthodox Christianity
Adjarians	560,000	Adjara	Kartvelians	Adjarian dialect	Georgians	Sunni Islam
Fereydani	100,000	Fereydan	Kartvelians	Pereidnuli dialect	Georgians	Shia Islam
Andis	40,000	Andia	Northeast caucasians	Andi	Avar–Andic people	Sunni Islam
Akhvakhs	10,000	Akhvakh district	Northeast caucasians	Akhvakh	Avar–Andic people	Sunni Islam
Avars	1200000	Avaria	Northeast caucasians	Avar	Avar–Andic people	Sunni Islam
Bagvalals	5,000	Tsumadinsky District	Northeast caucasians	Bagvalal	Avar–Andic people	Sunni Islam
Botlikhs	3,788	Botlikhsky District	Northeast caucasians	Botlikh	Avar–Andic people	Sunni Islam
Chamalals	10,000	Tsumadinsky District	Northeast caucasians	Chamalal	Avar–Andic people	Sunni Islam
Godoberi	4,000	Botlikhsky District	Northeast caucasians	Godoberi	Avar–Andic people	Sunni Islam
Karatas	7,500	Khasavyurtovsky District	Northeast caucasians	Karata	Avar–Andic people	Sunni Islam
Tindi	10,000	Andi-Koysu river	Northeast caucasians	Tindi	Avar–Andic people	Sunni Islam
Dargins	700,000	Darginia	Northeast caucasians	Dargwa	Dargins	Sunni Islam
Kaitag	25,000–30,000	Kaytagsky District	Northeast caucasians	Kaitag	Dargins	Sunni Islam
Kubachi	7,000	Kubachi	Northeast caucasians	Kubachin	Dargins	Sunni Islam
Itsaris	2,000	Itsari	Northeast caucasians	Itsari	Dargins	Sunni Islam
Chirags	2,000	Chirag	Northeast caucasians	Chirag	Dargins	Sunni Islam
Khinalugs	2,233	Shahdag	Northeast caucasians	Khinalug	Khinalugs	Sunni Islam
Laks	200,000	Lakia	Northeast caucasians	Lak	Laks	Sunni Islam
Lezgins	1000000	Lezgistan	Northeast caucasians	Lezgian	Lezgic people	Sunni Islam
Aghuls	45,000	Aguldere gorge	Northeast caucasians	Aghul	Lezgic people	Sunni Islam
Archin	5,000	Archib	Northeast caucasians	Archin	Lezgic people	Sunni Islam
Budukhs	1,000	Shahdag	Northeast caucasians	Budukh	Lezgic people	Sunni Islam
Tabasarans	155,000	Tabarstan	Northeast caucasians	Tabasaran	Lezgic people	Sunni Islam
Jeks	11,000	Shahdag	Northeast caucasians	Jek	Lezgic people	Sunni Islam
Kryts	10,000–15,000	Shahdag	Northeast caucasians	Kryts	Lezgic people	Sunni Islam
Rutuls	120,000	Rutulsky District	Northeast caucasians	Rutul	Lezgic people	Sunni Islam
Tsakhurs	30,000	Tsakhur	Northeast caucasians	Tsakhur	Lezgic people	Sunni Islam
Udis	10,000	Utik	Northeast caucasians	Udi	Lezgic people	Albanian-Udi Church
Bats	3,000	Tusheti	Northeast caucasians	Bats	Nakh people	Orthodox Christianity
Chechens	2000000	Chechnya	Northeast caucasians	Chechen	Nakh people	Sunni Islam
Ingush	700,000	Ingushetia	Northeast caucasians	Ingush	Nakh people	Sunni Islam
Tsez	30,000	Tsunta district	Northeast caucasians	Tsez	Tsezic (Didoic) people	Sunni Islam
Bezhta	13,000	Tsunta district	Northeast caucasians	Bezhta	Tsezic (Didoic) people	Sunni Islam
Hinukh	4,000	Tsunta district	Northeast caucasians	Hinukh	Tsezic (Didoic) people	Sunni Islam
Hunzib	6,200	Tsunta district	Northeast caucasians	Hunzib	Tsezic (Didoic) people	Sunni Islam
Khwarshis	8,500	Tsumadinsky district	Northeast caucasians	Khwarshi	Tsezic (Didoic) people	Sunni Islam
Abaza	150,000	Abasgia	Northwest caucasians	Abazin	Abazins	Sunni Islam
Abkhazians	185,000–600,000	Abkhazia	Northwest caucasians	Abkhaz	Abkhazians	Orthodox Christianity in Abkhazia Sunni Islam in Turkey
Circassians	5300000	Circassia	Northwest caucasians	Circassian	Circassians	Sunni Islam
Kabardians	1628500	Kabardia	Northwest caucasians	Kabardian dialect	Circassians	Sunni Islam
Ubykhs	20,000	Ubykhia	Northwest caucasians	Ubykh	Circassians	Sunni Islam
Armenians	8000000–16000000	Armenia	Indo-Europeans	Armenian	Armenians	Armenian Apostolic
Cherkesogai	100,000–350,000	Circassia	Indo-Europeans	Circassian, Armenian	Armenians	Armenian Apostolic
Zoks	<1,000	Goghtn	Indo-Europeans	Zok dialect	Armenians	Armenian Apostolic
Hemshins	150,000–200,000	Hemshin	Indo-Europeans	Homshetsi dialect	Armenians	Armenian Apostolic in Georgia, Russia Sunni Islam in Turkey
Pontic Greeks	2000000–2500000	Pontus	Indo-Europeans	Pontic Greek	Greeks	Orthodox Christianity in Greece Sunni Islam in Turkey
Urums	192,700	Caucasus	Indo-Europeans	Urum	Greeks	Orthodox Christianity
Ossetians	700,000	Ossetia	Indo-Europeans	Ossetian	Iranians	Orthodox Christianity Uatsdin
Digors	100,000	Ossetia	Indo-Europeans	Digor dialect	Iranians	Sunni Islam
Irons	200,000	Ossetia	Indo-Europeans	Iron dialect	Iranians	Orthodox Christianity
Talyshs	1200000–2000000	Talyshistan	Indo-Europeans	Talysh	Iranians	Sunni Islam in Iran Shia Islam in Azerbaijan
Tats	100,000	Shirvan	Indo-Europeans	Tat	Iranians	Shia Islam
Caucasian Kurds	162,742	Predominantly Transcaucasia	Indo-Europeans	Kurdish	Iranians	Shia Islam
Caucasian Yazidis	43,000	Ararat plain	Indo-Europeans	Kurdish	Iranians	Yazidism
Assyrians	35,000	Armenia and Georgia	Afroasiatic people	Eastern Aramaic	Semites	Assyrian Church of the East
Georgian Jews	65,000–80,000	Georgia	Afroasiatic people	Judaeo-Georgian	Semites	Judaism
Mountain Jews	150,000–270,000	Eastern and Northern Caucasus	Afroasiatic people	Judeo-Tat	Semites	Judaism
Kalmyks	195,000	Kalmykia	Mongolic people	Kalmyk	Oirat	Buddhism
Kumyks	600,000	Kumykia	Turkic people	Kumyk	Kipchaks	Sunni Islam
Balkars	135,000	Balkaria	Turkic people	Balkar dialect	Kipchaks	Sunni Islam
Karachays	250,000	Karachay-Cherkessia	Turkic people	Karachay dialect	Kipchaks	Sunni Islam
Nogais	120,000	Nogai Horde	Turkic people	Nogai	Kipchaks	Sunni Islam
Ahiska Turks	500,000–600,000	Samtskhe	Turkic people	Meskhetian Turkish dialect	Kipchaks	Sunni Islam
Azerbaijanis	30000000–35000000	Azerbaijan	Turkic people	Azerbaijani	Oghuz Turks	Shia Islam

== By location ==
Homeland of peoples of the Caucasus
Abbreviations: mouseover for name

This gives ethnic locations about 1775 before the Russians came. NECLS means 'Northeast Caucasian Language Speakers' and NWCLS means 'Northwest Caucasian Language Speakers'. The linguistic nationalities that we now recognise are somewhat artificial. Two hundred years, ago a person's loyalty was to their friends, kin, village and chief and not primarily to their language group. The difference between steppe, mountain and plain was far more important than difference of language. Only the southern half (and the southernmost part of Dagestan) had organized states, usually Persian or Turkish vassals and few, if any, of these states corresponded well to language groups.

Northern Lowlands: The Turkic-speaking Nogai nomads occupied almost all of the steppe north of the Caucasus. In the nineteenth century they were pushed far southeast to their present location. Formerly part of the eastern steppe was occupied by Kalmyks – Buddhist Mongols who migrated from Dzungaria about 1618. In 1771 many returned to their original homeland and they contracted to their present location in the far northeast, Nogais temporarily taking their place. In the southeast were the isolated Terek Cossacks. Their settlements later grew into the North Caucasus Line. There were a few Turkmens in the center of the steppe.

North Slope: The western two thirds was occupied by Circassians – NWCLS divided into twelve or so tribes. They long resisted the Russians and in 1864 several hundred thousand of them were expelled to the Ottoman Empire. To their east were the Kabardians – NWCLS similar to the Circassians but with a different political organization. The term Lesser Kabardia refers to the eastern area. South of the eastern Circassian-Kabardians were three groups that seem to have been driven into the high mountains about 500 years previously. The Karachays and Balkars spoke similar Turkic languages. East of the Balkars were the Ossetians – Iranian speakers descended from the ancient Alans who controlled the future Georgian Military Road and had a growing Christian minority. East of the future highway was a north-south band of Ingush – NECLS similar to the Chechens. The numerous Chechens to the east were later to wage the long Murid War against the Russians. For the small groups south of the Ingush-Chechens see South Slope below. To the east along the coast were the Turkic Kumyks.

Mountain Dagestan: All the peoples of mountain Dagestan were NECLS except the Tats. In the northwest were a number of small language groups (Tsez people (Dido) and Andi people), similar to the Avars. To their southeast were the numerous Avars with a khanate at Khunzakh who fought in the Murid War. Southeast were the Dargins and west of them the Laks who held the Kumukh Khanate. Southeast along the Samur were the Lezgins with many subgroups and then the Iranian-speaking Tats down to Baku.

Caspian Coast: From Astrakhan to the Terek River there were the Buddhist Kalmyk nomads. Along the Terek were the isolated Terek Cossacks. From the Terek to Derbent were the Turkic-speaking Kumyks with a state at Tarki. The town of Derbent itself had a majority Persian (Russian: персы) population, as it had for many centuries, until the late 19th century. On the coastal plain south of Derbent was a mixed population, mostly Azeri ("Transcaucasian Tatar"), and further south to Baku were the Iranian-speaking Tats. When Baku became a boom town the Tats retained a majority only in the mountains. The Mountain Jews, who had a number of villages inland from the coast, spoke a form of Tat called Judeo-Tat. The lowlands south of Baku were held by Azerbaijanis, Turkic-speaking Shiites. On both sides of the current Iranian border were the Iranian-speaking Talysh. Based on genetic studies the Gilaki and Mazanderani ethnic groups in northern Iran (near the Caspian Sea) have been proven to be genetically similar to Armenians, Georgians and Azeris. This indicates that the Gilaki and Mazanderani ethnic groups are people that immigrated from the Caucasus region to what is now northern Iran.

South Slope: Black Sea coast: In the northwest the mountains came down to the sea and the population was Circassian. Southward the coastal plain broadened and the population was Abkhazians – similar to the Circassians but under Georgian influence.

South Slope proper: On the south side of the Caucasus the mountains fall quickly to the plains and there is only a small transition zone. The inhabitants were either Georgians with mountain customs or northern mountaineers who had moved south. The Svans were Georgian mountaineers. In the center the Iranian Ossets had moved south and were surrounded on three sides by Georgians. East of the Ossets and south of the Ingush-Chechens were three groups of Georgian mountaineers on both sides of the mountain crest: Khevi, Khevsurs, and Tushetians. The Bats were NECLS entangled with the Tushetians and the Kists were Chechens south of the mountains. Near the Georgian-Azeri linguistic border there were some Avars and Tsakhurs (Lezgians) who had crossed the mountains. Associated with the Tsakhurs were the Ingiloy or Georgian-speaking Muslims. In the north Azeri area were a few Udis or southern Lezgians and Lakhij or southern Tats.

Southern Lowlands: The western two thirds were occupied by Georgians – an ancient Christian people with a unique language. The eastern third was Azerbaijanis – a group of Turkic-speaking Shiites under Persian influence. On the fringe of the Georgian area were Georgian speakers who had either adopted Islam or mountain customs.

Armenian Highlands: Further South, the land becomes higher. In the west were the Laz people or Georgian Muslims. In Kars province there were Turks, Kurds and Armenians. The Armenians, which gave the plateau its namesake, were somewhat concentrated in the present-day Armenia but were mostly spread out as a minority all over Asia Minor. There were groups of Azeris west of their main area who tended to blend with the Turks. The Kurds were semi-nomadic shepherds with small groups in various places and concentrations in Kars province and Nakhchivan. In the far southeast were the Iranian Talysh.

== Genetic history ==
Language groups in the Caucasus are closely correlated to genetic ancestry.

According to a 2021 study, Caucasian hunter-gatherer ancestry (CHG) significantly contributed to the genetic makeup of modern Caucasian populations but the proportion of CHG alleles are highest in modern peoples that live close to the archaeological sites in western Georgia, where the bones of CHG were discovered. The proportion gradually decreases away from this region, being replaced by ancient Anatolian and European alleles. Ancient Anatolian alleles are common in the genomes of modern peoples in Georgia and east Turkey (i.e. Georgians from Meskheti province, Laz and Armenians). But for peoples from north Caucasus, ancient Balkan alleles were common. Intensified immigration to the Caucasus during the early post-Last Glacial Maximum period explains the presence of these alleles.

== See also ==
- Abkhazians of African descent
- Ethnic groups in Armenia
- Ethnic groups in Azerbaijan
- Ethnic groups in Georgia
- Ethnic groups in Russia
- Languages of the Caucasus
- Peoples of the Caucasus in Iraq
- Y-DNA haplogroups in populations of the Caucasus
- Homo erectus georgicus
- Ethnic groups in Europe
- List of dishes from the Caucasus
