= JEK =

Jek or JEK may refer to:

- Jek (Quba), a village in the Quba Rayon of Azerbaijan.
- Jek Bridge, a bridge crossing the Gradaščica
- Jek language, a Northeast Caucasian language
- Jek people, an ethnic group in Azerbaijan
- Jek Porkins, a Star Wars character
- Jeri language
- Kynaston Studd (1858–1944), British cricketer, businessman and Lord Mayor of London
- Jek-14, a character the TV miniseries Lego Star Wars: The Yoda Chronicles

== See also ==
- Sharaz Jek, a Doctor Who villain
- Gojek
