= Jek people =

Northeast Caucasian ethnic group of Azerbaijan

Jeks
Ceklilər / Цеклар
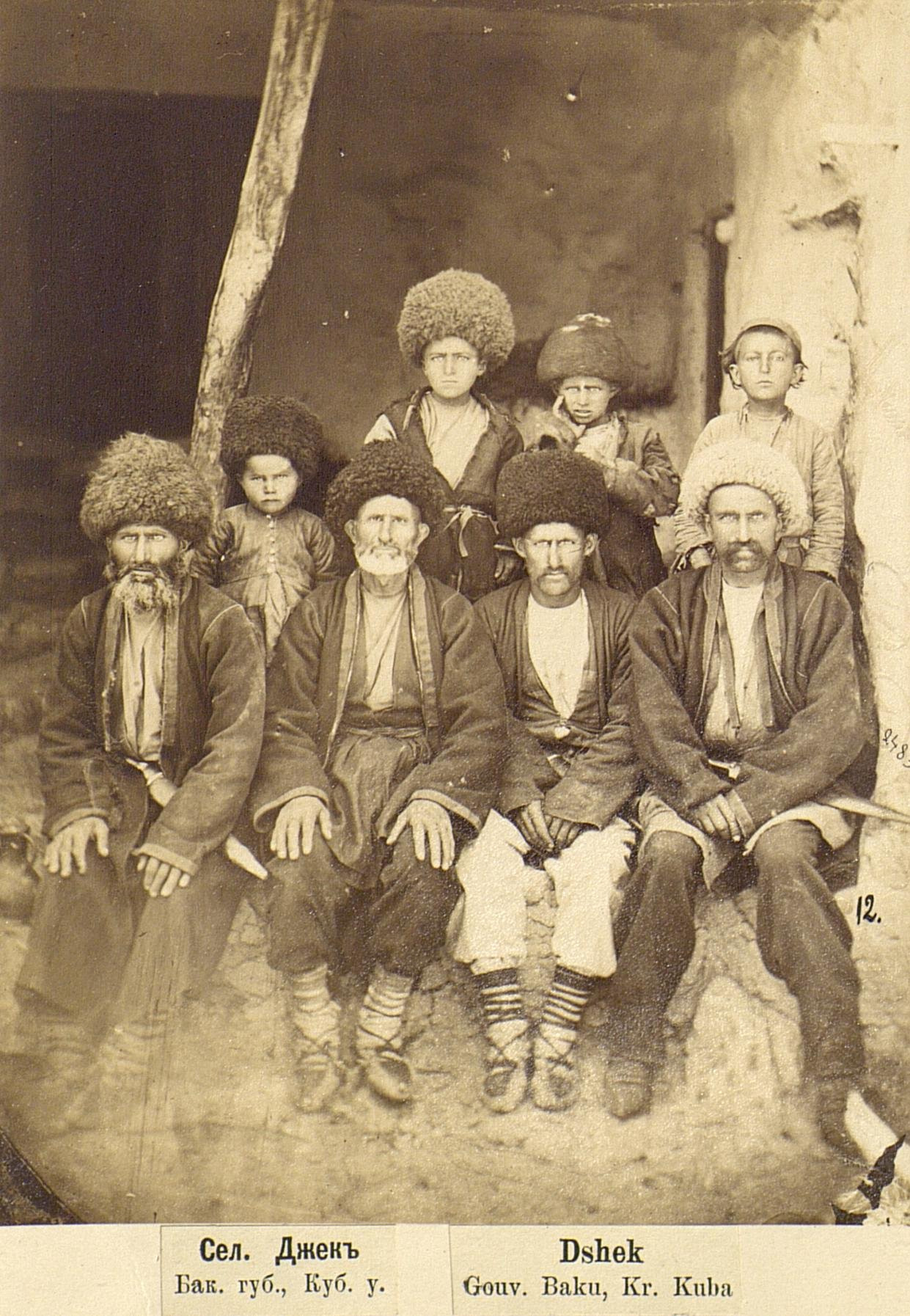

Total population
- approx. 11,000

Regions with significant populations

Languages
- Jek language, Azerbaijani language

Religion
- Sunni Islam

Related ethnic groups
- Shahdagh peoples, Lezgic peoples, Northeast Caucasian peoples

The Jeks (also spelled Jek, Dzhek; Jek: Cekler; Azerbaijani: Ceklilər; Russian: джеки) are a small Northeast Caucasian ethnic group indigenous to northern Azerbaijan. They are one of the Shahdagh peoples, a group of historically distinct mountain communities of the eastern Greater Caucasus that also includes the Kryts, Budukhs, and Khinalugs.

The traditional homeland of the Jeks is located in the mountainous part of the Quba District of northern Azerbaijan, particularly around the village of Jek. The community historically developed in an isolated mountain environment where local village institutions, distinct language, and cultural traditions were preserved.

The Jek population is estimated at approximately 11,000 people. However, the number of fluent speakers of the Jek language is considerably smaller because many ethnic Jeks have shifted to Azerbaijani, which is dominant in education, administration, and public life.

The Jek language belongs to the Lezgic branch of the Northeast Caucasian language family. It is closely related to other small Shahdagh languages, including Kryts, Budukh, and Khinalug.

Most Jeks are Sunni Muslims. Their religious traditions developed within the broader Islamic culture of northern Azerbaijan and the eastern Caucasus, while retaining elements of local mountain community life.

== Ethnonym ==
The Jeks call themselves Cekler (Цеклар). The ethnonym derives from the name of their historical settlement, Jek, located in the mountainous region of the Quba area.

Different spellings of the ethnonym appear in historical and ethnographic sources, including Jek, Dzhek, Dzek, and Cek. These variations result from different systems of transcription used for Northeast Caucasian languages in Russian, Azerbaijani, and European scholarship.

The Jeks are traditionally classified among the Shahdagh peoples, a group of small indigenous communities whose historical territories are concentrated around the mountainous Quba region. Although these groups share linguistic and cultural similarities, each developed its own distinct language and village identity.

== Geography and traditional settlement ==
The historical homeland of the Jeks lies in the northeastern part of the Greater Caucasus, in the mountain valleys of the modern Quba District of Azerbaijan. The region is characterized by steep slopes, isolated settlements, and limited agricultural land.

The main historical settlement of the Jeks is Jek village

Mountain geography played an important role in shaping Jek society. The relative isolation of villages contributed to the preservation of the Jek language and local traditions, while trade and interaction connected the community with neighboring Azerbaijani, Lezgian, and other Shahdagh populations.

== Classification and relations with other peoples ==
The Jeks belong to the group of small Northeast Caucasian communities traditionally known as the Shahdagh peoples. These communities are concentrated in the mountainous areas around Mount Shahdagh and the northern part of the Greater Caucasus in Azerbaijan.

The Shahdagh peoples include:

- Jeks
- Khinalugs
- Kryts
- Budukhs

The languages of these communities belong mainly to the Lezgic branch of the Northeast Caucasian language family. Although closely related, these languages developed separately because of the geographical isolation of mountain villages.

The Jeks have historically maintained close cultural and economic relations with neighboring peoples, especially Lezgins, Azerbaijanis, and other Shahdagh communities. These contacts resulted in multilingualism, cultural exchange, and shared elements of material culture while preserving a distinct Jek identity.

== Early history ==
The early history of the Jeks is connected with the ancient settlement history of the eastern Caucasus. The Northeast Caucasus has been inhabited for thousands of years by communities whose descendants include many of the modern Dagestani and northern Azerbaijani peoples.

Because the Jeks historically lacked a written literary tradition, early information about their community comes mainly from archaeological evidence, linguistic comparison, and records produced by neighboring states and later ethnographers.

The mountainous regions of northern Azerbaijan were historically inhabited by numerous small communities organized around fortified villages, local customary institutions, and kinship networks. The ancestors of the Jeks developed within this environment and maintained a separate linguistic identity while participating in wider regional networks.

== Medieval and early modern period ==
During the medieval period, the Jek area formed part of the wider eastern Caucasian cultural zone influenced by different political powers, including states associated with Caucasian Albania, Persian dynasties, and local Caucasian rulers.

The inhabitants of the region preserved local village autonomy while interacting with larger political formations. Mountain communities often maintained their own customary laws and social structures despite changes in external political authority.

From the 16th century onward, the region became connected with the political and economic sphere of Persian and Turkic-speaking states, particularly the Safavid, Afsharid, and Qajar periods. These connections influenced administration, trade, and religious life in northern Azerbaijan.

== Quba Khanate period ==
In the 18th century, the Jek region became associated with the Quba Khanate, one of the regional political entities that emerged following the weakening of centralized Iranian control in the eastern Caucasus.

The Quba Khanate incorporated a diverse population including Turkic-speaking Azerbaijanis and several Northeast Caucasian-speaking mountain communities. The Jeks retained their local language and village traditions while existing within the wider political framework of the khanate.

== Russian Empire period ==
During the early 19th century, the eastern Caucasus became the scene of competition between the Russian Empire and Qajar Iran. Following the Treaty of Gulistan (1813) and the Treaty of Turkmenchay (1828), northern Azerbaijan, including the Quba region, was incorporated into the Russian Empire.

Russian rule introduced new administrative structures and connected the mountain communities more closely with imperial institutions. However, local village organization, Islamic traditions, and customary practices continued to influence everyday life.

During the late 19th century, Russian scholars and ethnographers began documenting the languages and customs of the small peoples of the Caucasus. The Jeks were recorded as a distinct community with their own language and traditions.

== Soviet period ==
After the establishment of Soviet rule in Azerbaijan, the Jeks became part of the Azerbaijan Soviet Socialist Republic. Soviet policies transformed the social, economic, and linguistic environment of the Jek community.

The Soviet government promoted mass education, industrialization, and administrative integration. Azerbaijani became the main language of education and public administration in the region, while Russian gained importance as the language of higher education and communication throughout the Soviet Union.

Unlike larger national groups of the Soviet Union, the Jeks did not receive a separate autonomous administrative unit. Their language remained primarily a local spoken language and was not introduced as a language of schooling or official administration.

Collectivization, modernization, and migration from mountain villages contributed to social changes among the Jeks. Many moved to towns and lowland areas, where Azerbaijani became dominant and where traditional village-based lifestyles gradually declined.

== Jek language ==
The Jek language is a member of the Lezgic branch of the Northeast Caucasian language family. It is part of the group of small Lezgic languages spoken historically in the eastern Caucasus.

Jek is closely related to other Shahdagh languages, including Kryts, Budukh, and Khinalug. These languages share similarities in grammar and vocabulary but remain separate linguistic systems.

Traditionally, Jek existed mainly as an oral language. It was transmitted within families and villages and did not develop an extensive written literature. Historical religious and administrative texts affecting the community were generally written in languages such as Arabic, Persian, Azerbaijani, or Russian depending on the period.

The number of ethnic Jeks is estimated at approximately 11,000, but the number of active Jek speakers is considerably lower. Many Jeks today are bilingual or primarily Azerbaijani-speaking, especially younger generations.

Modern linguistic studies have documented Jek vocabulary, grammar, and oral traditions as part of broader efforts to preserve the smaller languages of the Caucasus.

== Religion ==
The Jeks are traditionally Sunni Muslims. Islam became established among the communities of northern Azerbaijan over several centuries and became integrated with local social traditions.

Religious life historically centered around village mosques, Islamic scholars, and religious customs shared with neighboring Muslim communities of Azerbaijan and the eastern Caucasus.

During the Soviet period, religious institutions were restricted as part of state atheistic policies. After the independence of Azerbaijan, Islamic practices experienced a revival among many communities, including the Jeks.

== Traditional economy and culture ==
Traditional Jek society developed within a mountain environment where agriculture and livestock breeding formed the basis of the local economy.

Traditional activities included:

- cultivation of grain and vegetables;
- sheep and cattle breeding;
- horticulture;
- handicrafts;
- exchange with neighboring villages.

The mountainous environment encouraged cooperation between households and reinforced the importance of village communities and kinship networks.

Jek cultural traditions include oral folklore, local historical narratives, traditional clothing, music, and customary practices shared with other Shahdagh communities. Because the language historically lacked a written tradition, oral transmission played a major role in preserving cultural knowledge.

== Modern identity and preservation ==
Today, the Jeks maintain a distinct ethnic identity based on shared ancestry, historical settlement, cultural traditions, and connection to the Jek language.

The main challenges facing Jek cultural preservation are:

- decline in the number of fluent Jek speakers;
- dominance of Azerbaijani in education and public life;
- migration from traditional mountain settlements;
- limited use of Jek in written and digital environments.

Despite these pressures, interest in documenting and preserving Jek culture has increased through linguistic research, ethnographic studies, and local cultural initiatives.

== Gallery ==
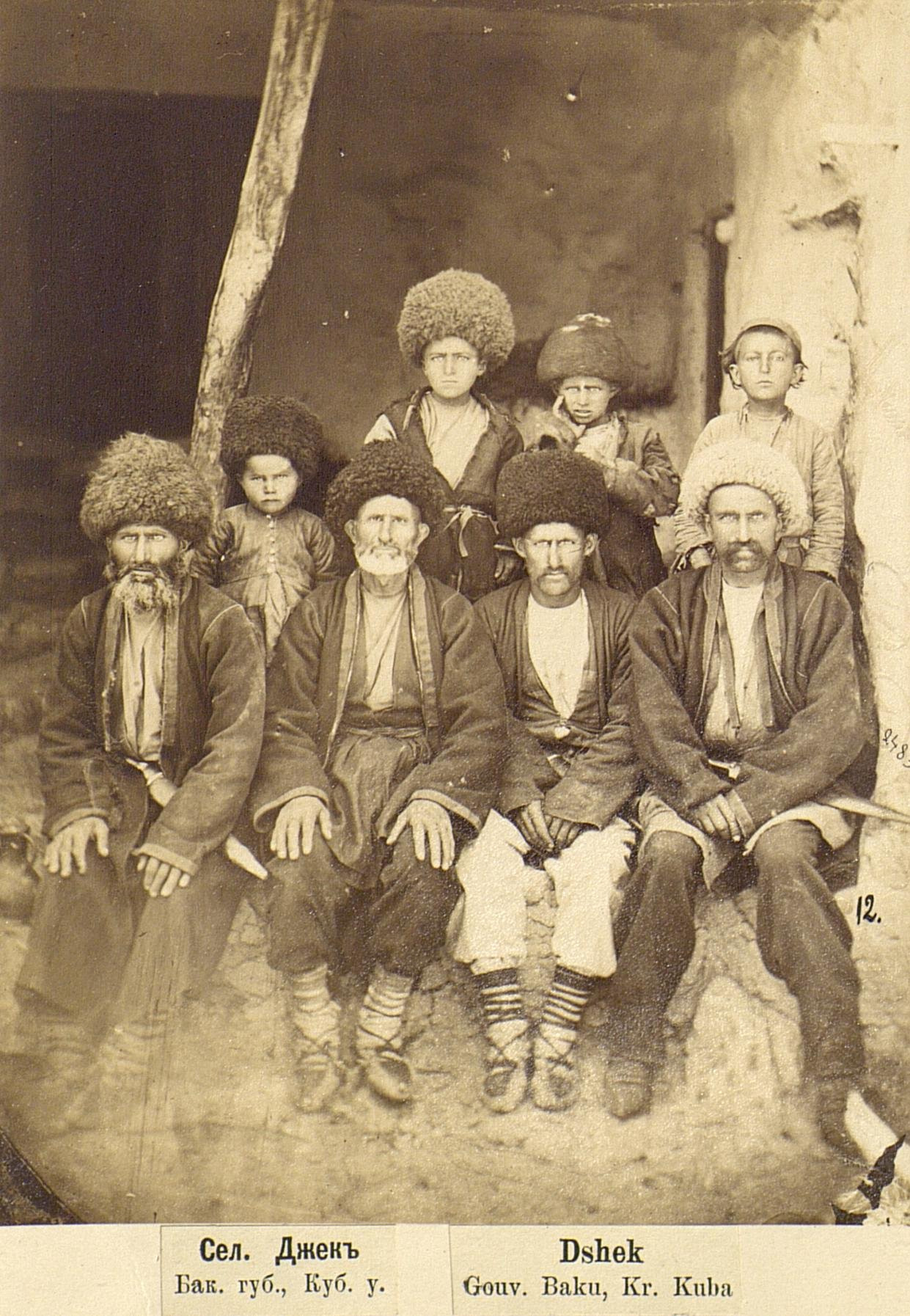
Jek people, 1880

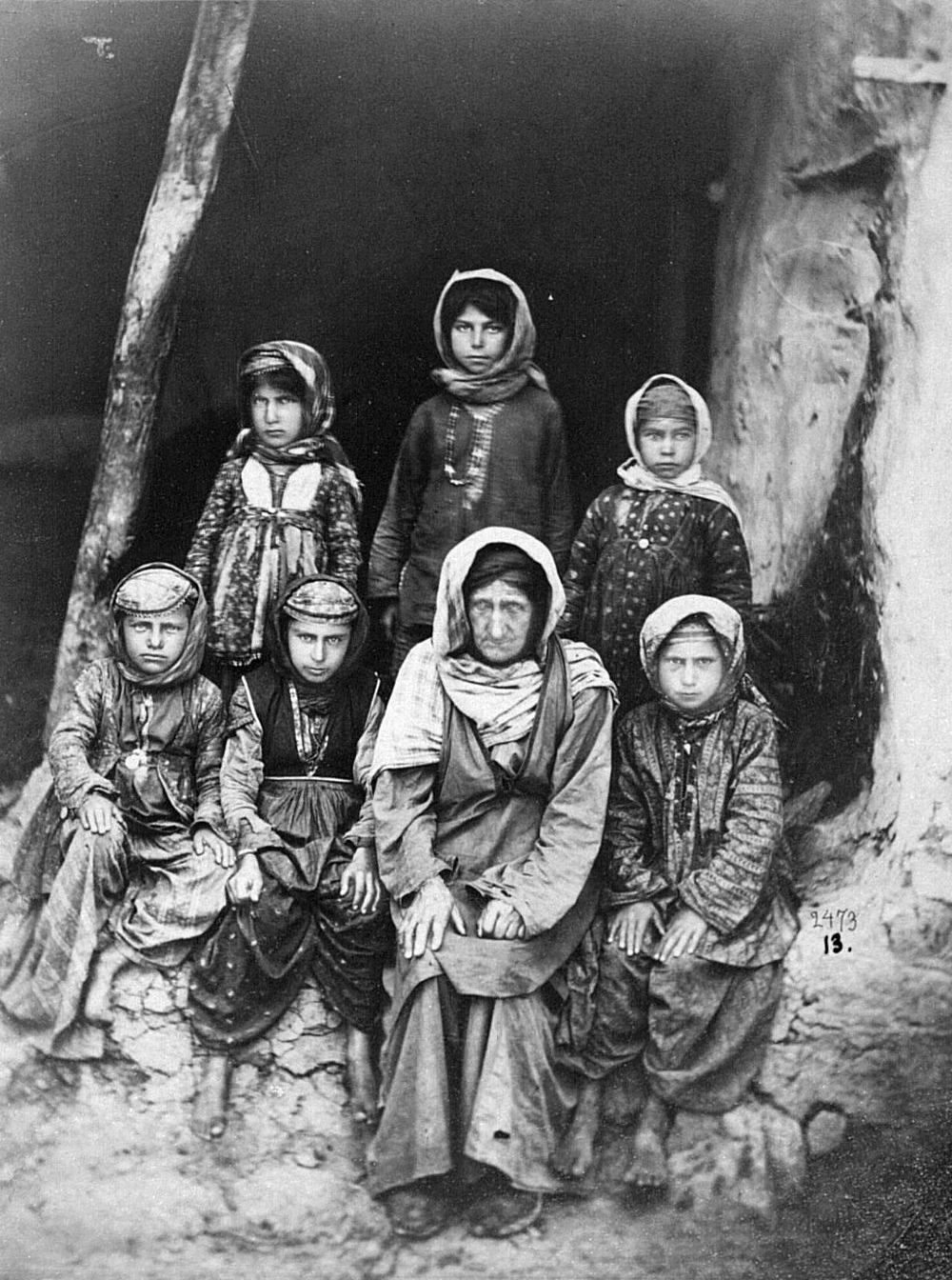
Jek people, 1880

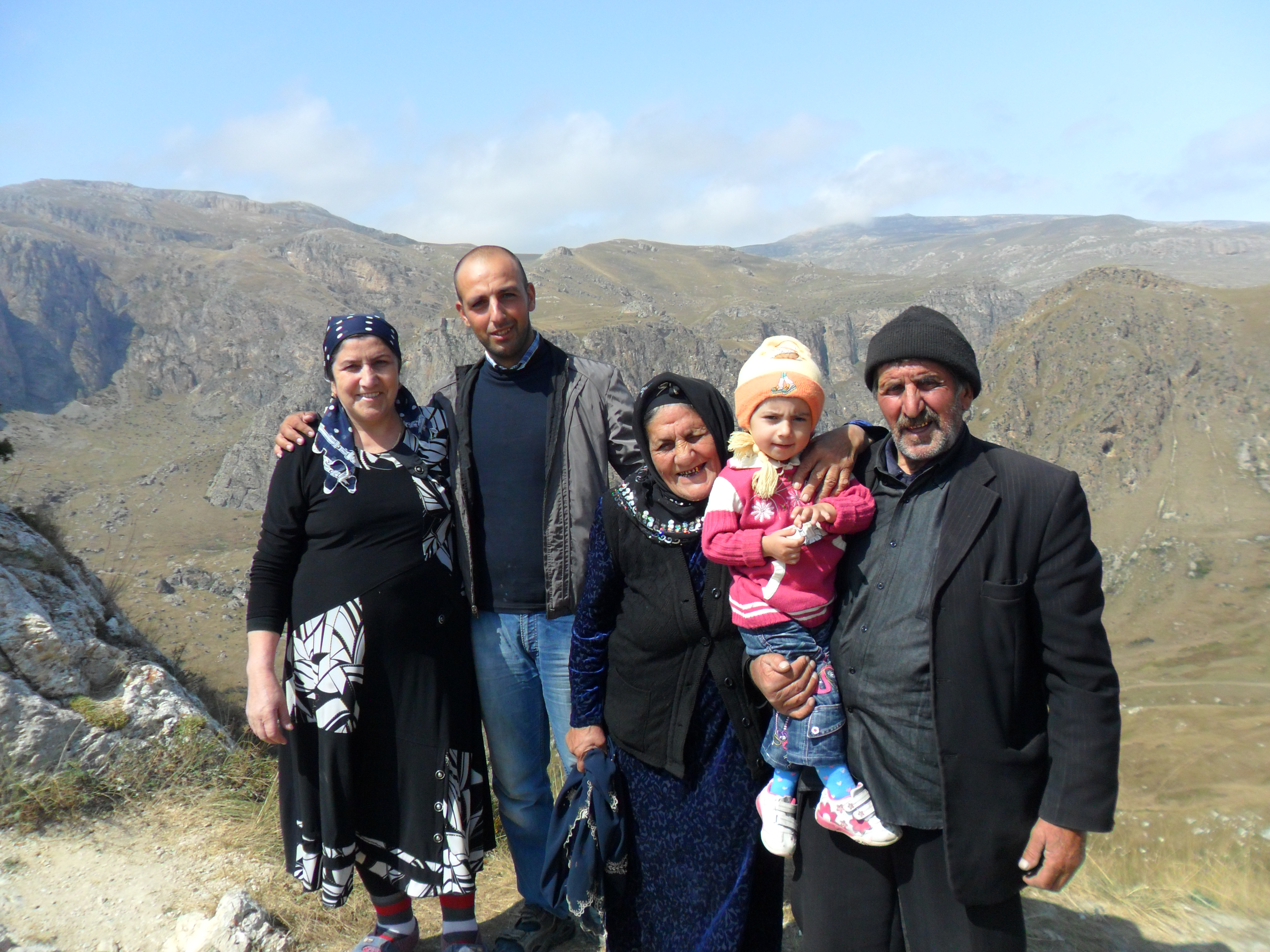
Jek people, 20 August 2012.

A Jek speaker, recorded in Germany.

== See also ==
- Jek language
- Shahdagh peoples
- Khinalug people
- Kryts people
- Budukh people
- Northeast Caucasian languages
- Ethnic groups in Azerbaijan

== Bibliography ==
- Baddeley, John F. The Russian Conquest of the Caucasus. London: Longmans, Green and Co., 1908.
- Bobrovnikov, Vladimir. Islam in the Russian North Caucasus. London: Routledge, 2000.
- Chirikba, Viacheslav. Caucasian Languages: An Overview. Leiden University, 2008.
- Comrie, Bernard. The Languages of the Soviet Union. Cambridge: Cambridge University Press, 1981.
- Hewitt, George. The Indigenous Languages of the Caucasus. Delmar, New York: Caravan Books, 1989.
- Hirsch, Francine. Empire of Nations: Ethnographic Knowledge and the Making of the Soviet Union. Ithaca: Cornell University Press, 2005.
- Koryakov, Yuri. Atlas of Caucasian Languages. Moscow: Institute of Linguistics, Russian Academy of Sciences, 2006.
- Minahan, James. Encyclopedia of the Stateless Nations: Ethnic and National Groups Around the World. Greenwood Press, 2002.
- Wixman, Ronald. The Peoples of the USSR: An Ethnographic Handbook. M.E. Sharpe, 1984.
