= Kryts =

Kryts may refer to:

- Kryts people, of the Caucasus of Azerbaijan
- Kryts language, Lezgic language spoken by the Kryts people
- Qrız, a village inhabited by the Kryts
