= Budukh =

Budukh may refer to:

- Budukh people, a people of the Caucasus in Quba District, northeastern Azerbaijan
- Budukh language, the Lezgic language spoken by the Budukh people

== See also ==
- Buduq, a village in Quba District of Azerbaijan
- Budukhshan
