= Kryz =

Kryz may refer to:

- Kryz Reid
- Kryts language
