= Aghul language =

Northeastern Caucasian language

Aghul
- агъул чӀал ağul ç̇al
- Native to: North Caucasus, also spoken in Azerbaijan
- Region: Southeastern Dagestan
- Ethnicity: Aghuls
- Native speakers: 33,182 (2020 census)
- Language family: Northeast Caucasian: Lezgic; Samur; Eastern Samur; Lezgi–Aghul–Tabasaran; Aghul
- Writing system: Cyrillic

Official status
- Official language in: Russia: Dagestan
- Regulated by: Gamzata Tsadasa Institute of Language, Literature and Art

Language codes
- ISO 639-3: agx
- Glottolog: aghu1260 Aghulic aghu1253
- ELP: Aghul
- Aghul

- Agul is classified as Definitely Endangered by the UNESCO Atlas of the World's Languages in Danger (2010).

Aghul is a Lezgic language within the Northeast Caucasian family, primarily spoken by the Aghuls in Azerbaijan and Southern Dagestan in Russia. It is spoken by about 33,200 people (2020 census).

== Classification ==
Aghul belongs to the Eastern Samur group of the Lezgic branch of the Northeast Caucasian language family. Glottolog splits the Aghul language between the Qushan/Koshan group and other Aghul dialects due to the Qushan dialects being unintelligible with the other dialects.

== Geographic distribution ==
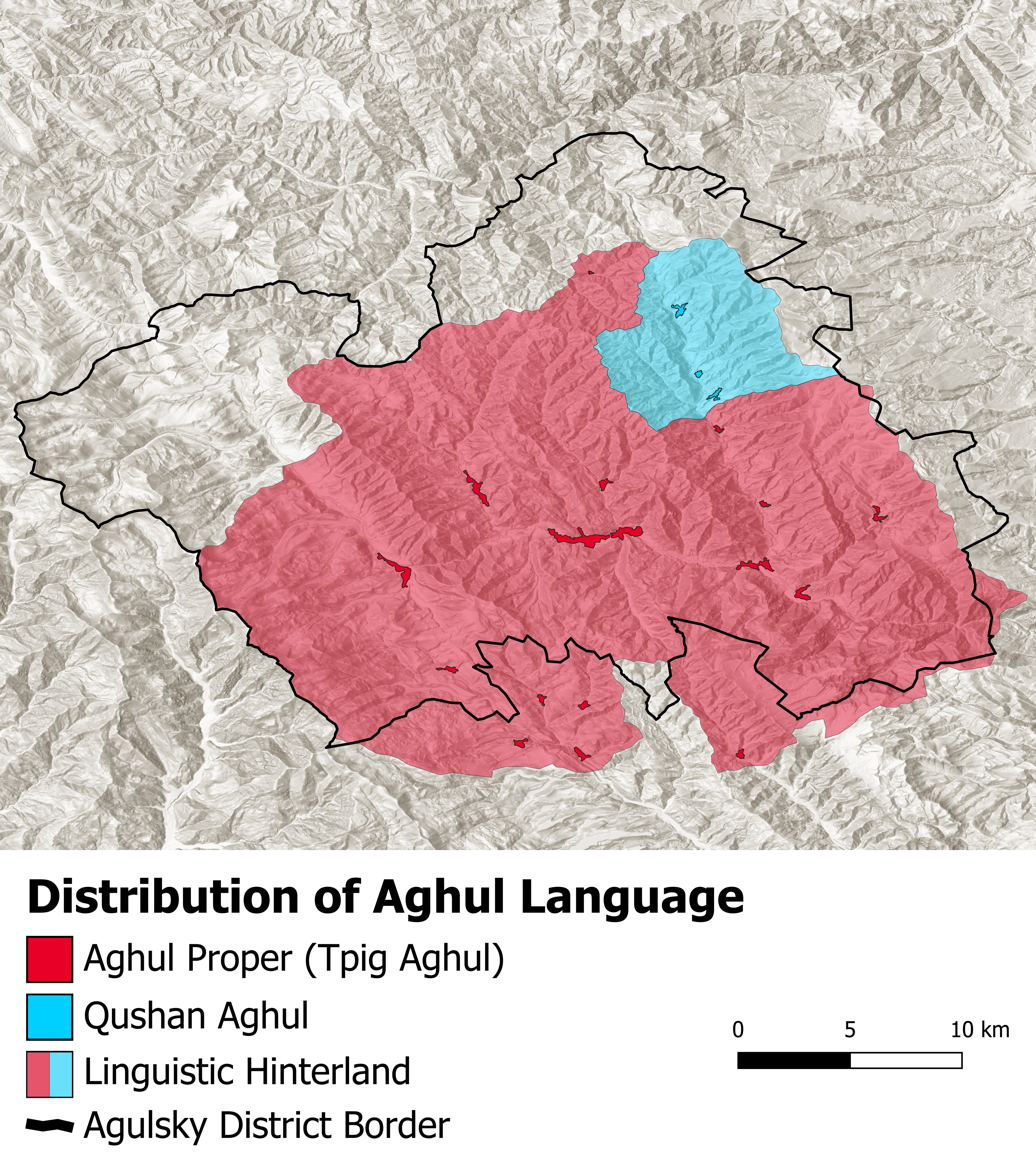

In 2002, Aghul was spoken by 28,300 people in Russia, mainly in Southern Dagestan in the Agulsky and Kurakhsky Districts, as well as 32 people in Azerbaijan.

=== Related languages ===
There are nine languages in the Lezgian language family, namely: Aghul, Tabasaran, Rutul, Lezgian, Tsakhur, Budukh, Kryts, Udi and Archi.

== Phonology ==
Aghul has contrastive epiglottal consonants. Aghul makes, like many Northeast Caucasian languages, a distinction between tense consonants with concomitant length and weak consonants. The tense consonants are characterized by the intensiveness (tension) of articulation, which naturally leads to a lengthening of the consonant, so they are traditionally transcribed with the length diacritic. The gemination of the consonant itself does not create its tension, but morphologically tense consonants often derive from adjoining two single weak consonants. Some Aghul dialects have a large number of permitted initial tense consonants.

=== Vowels ===
Vowels of Aghul
	Front	Central	Back	
Close	i		ɯ	u
Mid	e			
Open		a		

=== Consonants ===
Consonant phonemes of Aghul
			Labial	Dental		Alveolar		Palatal	Velar	Uvular	Pharyn- geal	Glottal
			Labial	plain	sib.	plain	lab.	Palatal	Velar	Uvular	Pharyn- geal	Glottal
Nasal			m	n								
Plosive/ Affricate	voiced		b	d		d͡ʒ	d͡ʒʷ		ɡ			ʔ
Plosive/ Affricate	voiceless	fortis	pː	tː	t͡sː	t͡ʃː	t͡ʃʷː		kː	qː		ʔ
Plosive/ Affricate	voiceless	lenis	p	t	t͡s	t͡ʃ	t͡ʃʷ		k	q		ʔ
Plosive/ Affricate	ejective		pʼ	tʼ	t͡sʼ	t͡ʃʼ	t͡ʃʷʼ		kʼ	qʼ		ʔ
Fricative	voiceless	fortis	fː	sː		ʃː	ʃʷː		xː	χː		
Fricative	voiceless	lenis	f	s		ʃ	ʃʷ		x	χ		
Fricative	voiced		v	z		ʒ	ʒʷ			ʁ	ʢ	ɦ
Trill						r					ʜ	
Approximant				l				j				

- The glottal stop transcribed here is named rather ambiguously a "glottalic laryngeal" by the source.

== Alphabet ==
The Aghul alphabet was devised in the 1990s. Ever since then, it has been used as a language of education, with primers, textbooks, and dictionaries published.

А а	Б б	В в	Г г	Гъ гъ	Гь гь	ГӀ гӀ	Д д
Дж дж	Е е	Ё ё	Ж ж	З з	И и	Й й	К к
Кк кк	Къ къ	Кь кь	КӀ кӀ	Л л	М м	Н н	О о
П п	Пп пп	ПӀ пӀ	Р р	С с	Т т	Тт тт	ТӀ тӀ
У у	Уь уь	Ф ф	Х х	Хъ хъ	Хь хь	ХӀ хӀ	Ц ц
ЦӀ цӀ	Ч ч	Чч чч	ЧӀ чӀ	Ш ш	Щ щ	ъ	Ӏ
ы	ь	Э э	Ю ю	Я я

== Grammar ==
=== Case ===
There are four core cases: absolutive, ergative, genitive, and dative, as well as a large series of location cases. All cases other than the absolutive (which is unmarked) and ergative take the ergative suffix before their own suffix.

=== Adjectives ===
Independent and predicative adjectives take number marker and class marker; also, case if used as nominal. As attribute they are invariable. Thus idžed "good", ergative, idžedi, etc. -n, -s; pl. idžedar; but Idže insandi hhuč qini "The good man killed the wolf" (subject in ergative case).

=== Pronouns ===
==== Personal pronouns ====
	Aghul		Tokip	
	Singular	Plural	Singular	Plural
1	zun	čin (ex), xin (in)	či (ex), xi (in)	či, xi
2	wun	čun	čun	ču

== Sample text ==
Іисайи пуная гебурис: – ДуьгІе акье миштти: «Дад, Ве ттур гирами хьурай; Ве Паччагьвел адирай. ТІалаб аркьая чин Вакес гьер ягьас гуни. Гъил гьушен че гунагьарилас, чинна гьил гьуршанду кІилди час Іайвелар аркьаттарилас. ХІа темехІера хьас амарта час».
ˡisaji punaja geburis: – Du’gˡe ak’e mištti: "Dad, Ve ttur girami x’uraj; Ve Paččag’vel adiraj. Tˡalab ark’aja čin Vakes g’er jag’as guni. G″il g’ušen če gunag’arilas, činna g’il g’uršandu kˡildi čas ˡajvelar ark’attarilas. Xˡa temexˡera x’as amarta čas."
And he said unto them, When ye pray, say, Our Father which art in heaven, Hallowed be thy name. Thy kingdom come. Thy will be done, as in heaven, so in earth. Give us day by day our daily bread. And forgive us our sins; for we also forgive every one that is indebted to us. And lead us not into temptation; but deliver us from evil.

== Bibliography ==
- Haspelmath, Martin (1993). A grammar of Lezgian. Mouton grammar library. Vol. 9. Mouton de Gruyter. doi:10.1515/9783110884210. ISBN 3-11-013735-6. LCCN 92-45620.
- Ladefoged, Peter; Maddieson, Ian (1996). The Sounds of the World's Languages. Oxford: Blackwell. ISBN 0-631-19815-6.
- Talibov, Bukar B.; Gadžiev, Magomed M. (1966). Lezginsko-russkij slovar'. Moskva: Izd. Sovetskaja Ėnciklopedija. OCLC 231755759.
