= Shahdagh peoples =

Several small ethnic groups around Mount Shahdagh in northern Azerbaijan

Shahdagh people (also spelt Shah Dagh, Shakhdag, Shakhdagh and Shadag; Şahdağ in Azerbaijani orthography) is a generic term for several small ethnic groups living in the vicinity of Mount Shahdagh in northern Azerbaijan, particularly in three major villages of the district of Konakhkent (Quba) near the Daghestani border. The Shahdagh ethnic groups generally speak Samur languages of the Lezgic branch of the Northeast Caucasian language family.

== Ethnic groups ==
Several ethnic groups are included within the term "Shahdagh people". The name of each ethnic group's village has historically corresponded to the name of the ethnic group:

- The Budukh (also spelt Budug or Buduq) (2,000 in the 1926 Soviet census) live mainly in the village of Buduq but also live in Deli Gaya and Guney Budug (South Buduq) as well as scattered groups in Khudat, Ismailly, Khachmass, Kuba, Kutkashen and Zardob. Budukhs are Sunni Muslim and speak the Budukh language, a Southern Samur language.
- The Dzhek (also spelt Jek or Get) (2,600 in the 1926 Soviet census) live mainly in the village of Kryz but also live in Alik, Jek and Gapuk (Haput). Like the Budugs, Dzheks could also be found in Khudat, Ismailly, Khachmass, Kuba, Kutkashen and Zardob. Ethnolinguists have identified three subgroups of the Dzhek: the Dzhek, Kryz and Gaput. The Dzhek are Sunni Muslim, specifically favouring the Shafi school, and speak the Jek language, a Southern Samur language.
- The Khinalug (also spelt Khinalugh or Khinalugh) (100 in the 1926 Soviet census) live in the village of Khinalug. They call themselves the Kattitturdur, Ketsh or Khalkh. The Khinalug are Sunni Muslims also of the Shafi school and speak the Khinalug language, an isolate within the Northeast Caucasian language family.
- The Yerguj (also spelt Yergyudzh or Ergyudzhtsy) people live in Yergüc.

== History and culture ==
Shahdagh peoples have specific characteristic family and cultural traditions. It is possible to find many similarities and varieties between the wedding and mourning traditions of Shahdagh people and those of neighboring groups, such as Oghuz Turks.

The economic lifestyle of the people of Konakhkent (Quba) district is based on animal husbandry (sheep and goats in the highlands, cattle in the lowlands), gold and silver smithing, weaving, pottery and rug manufacturing. Because of the need to trade goods within the region of Dagestan, many Shahdaghs had to learn to speak Azeri.

For literary purposes, the Shahdagh peoples often utilize the Azeri language.

Traditionally, the Shahdaghs were governed by endogamous patriarchal clan systems, in which young people were encouraged to marry first or second cousins. That sense of clan cohesion was strengthened by the fact that all land was owned communally by the extended family unit. During the 1960s and 1970s, the Soviet government also succeeded in establishing cooperatives and collectivising many Shah Dagh herds and pasture lands; this policy aroused resentment among the local people.

Even though many Shahdaghs existed in the Soviet Union, the Budugs, Khinalugs and Dzheks did not appear in the Soviet censuses of 1959, 1970 and 1979. Ever since the 1920s, they were labelled as Azerbaijani, even though they were distinct peoples with their own languages and cultures. The fact that they were bilingual in Azeri and were surrounded and vastly outnumbered by Azerbaijanis contributed to their assimilation. Most Russian ethnologists today believe that the Shahdaghs have been all but completely assimilated by Azerbaijanis.

== Gallery ==
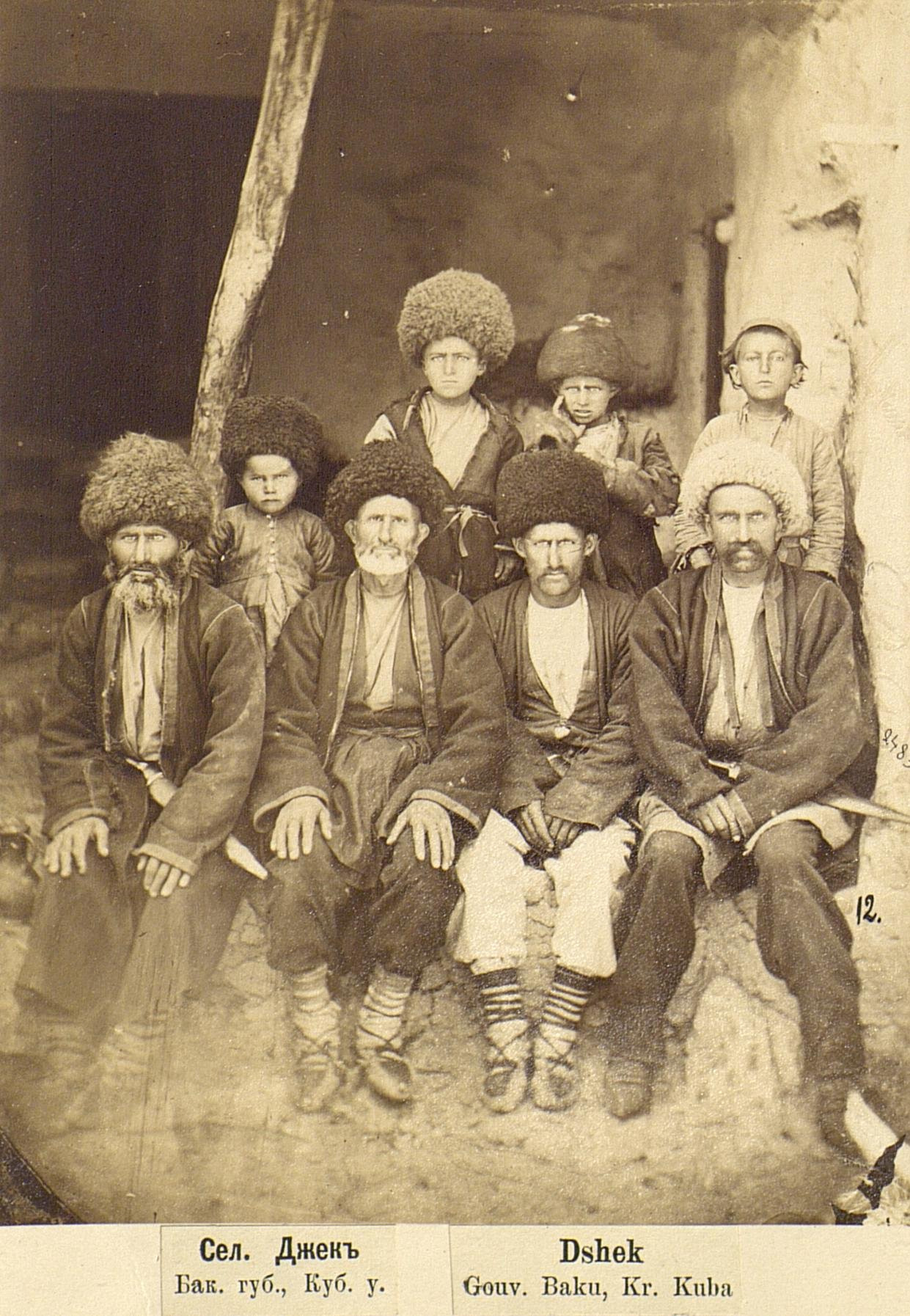
Jek people, 1880

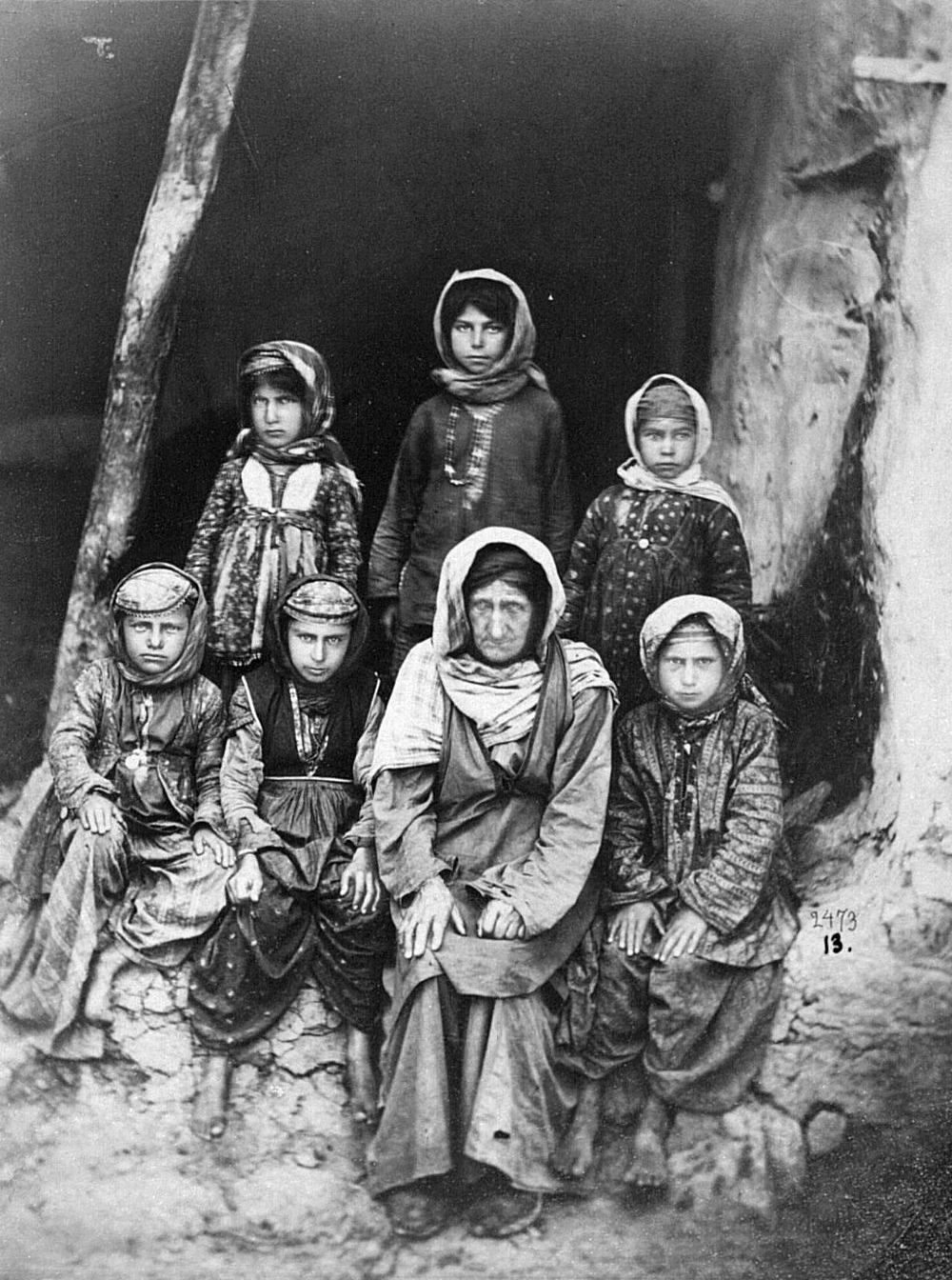
Jek people, 1880

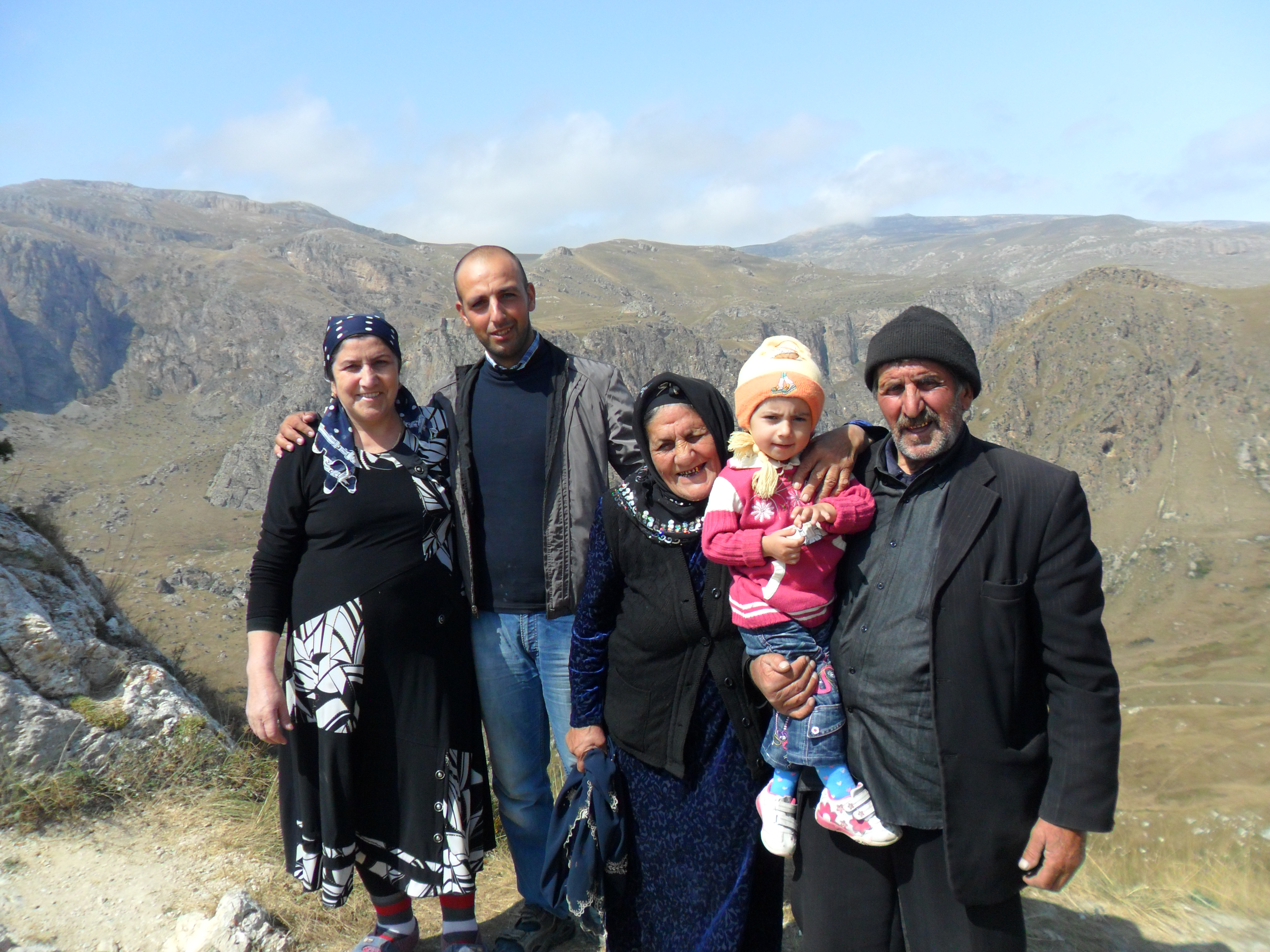
Jek people, 20 August 2012

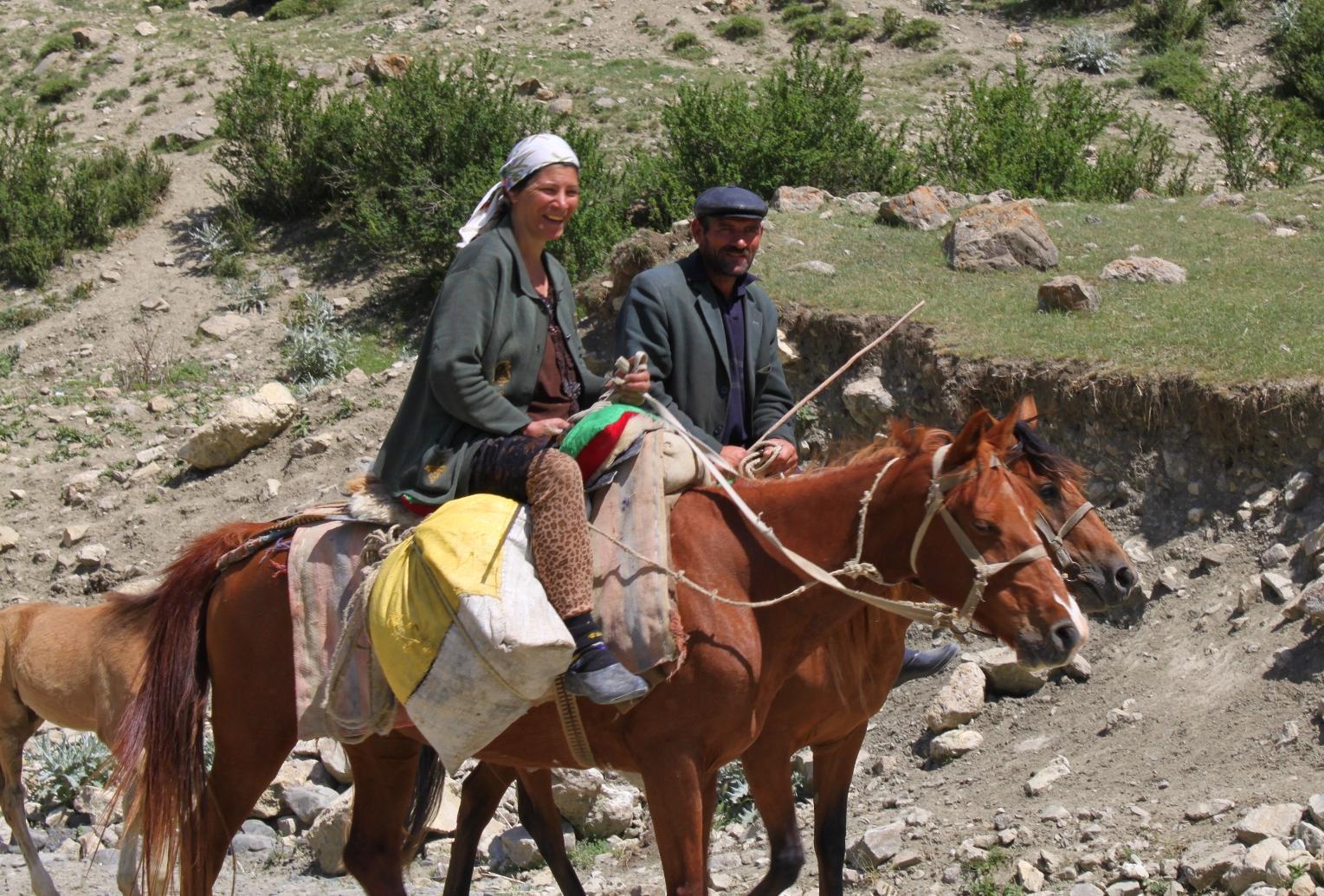
Khinalug residents of the village of Quba, Azerbaijan

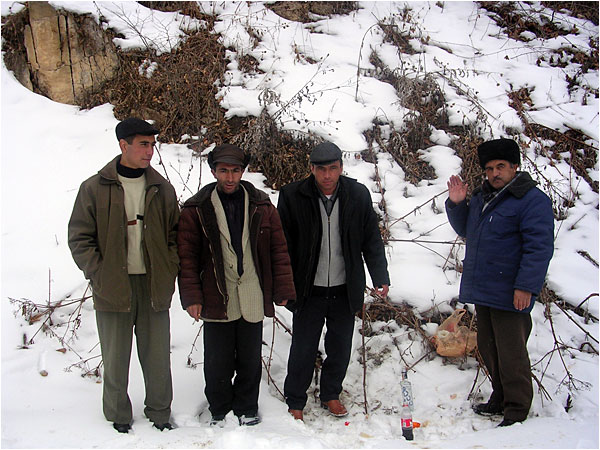
Khinalugs in the village of Khinalug, Azerbaijan

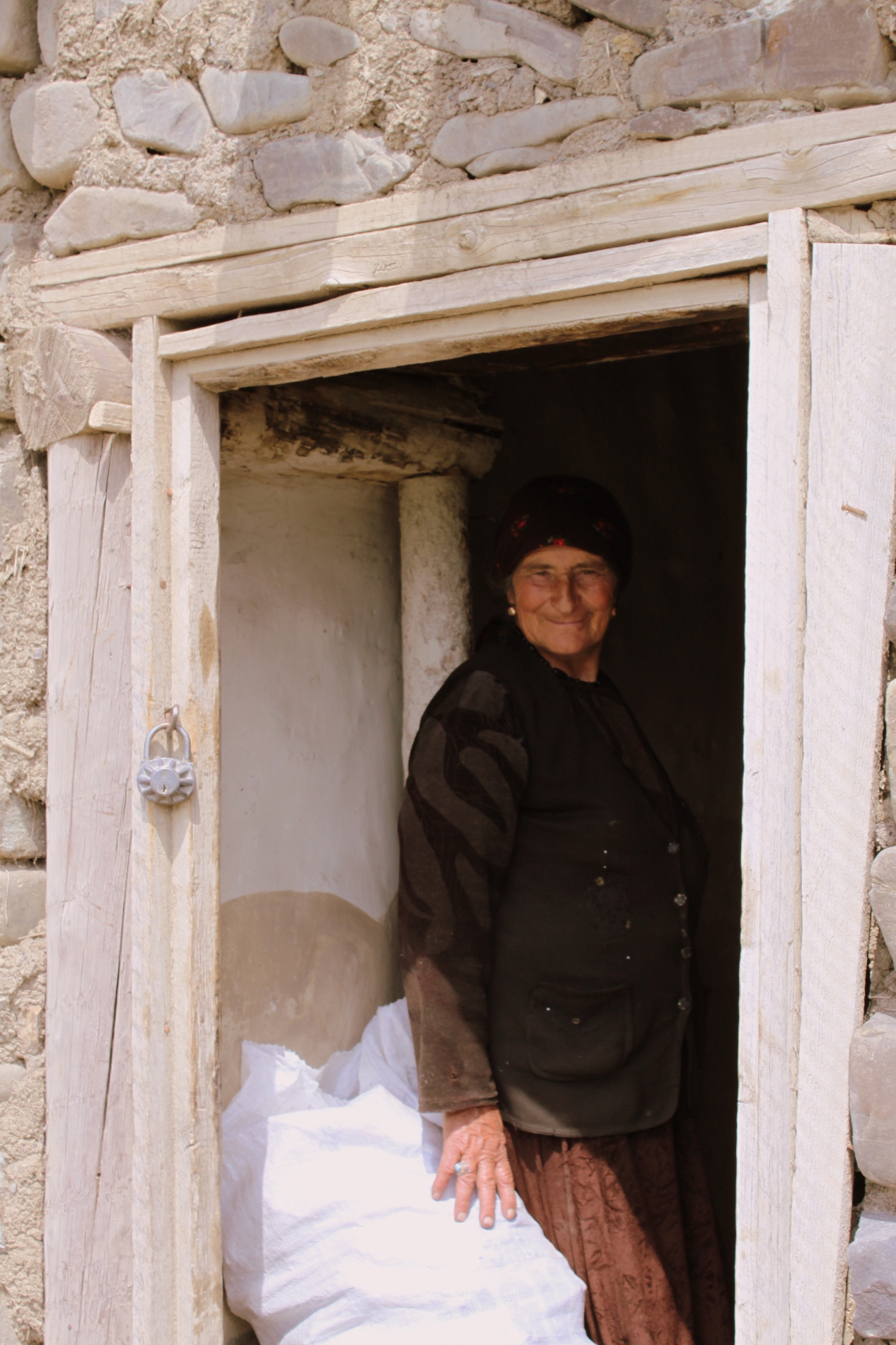
Khinalug resident of the village of Quba, Azerbaijan

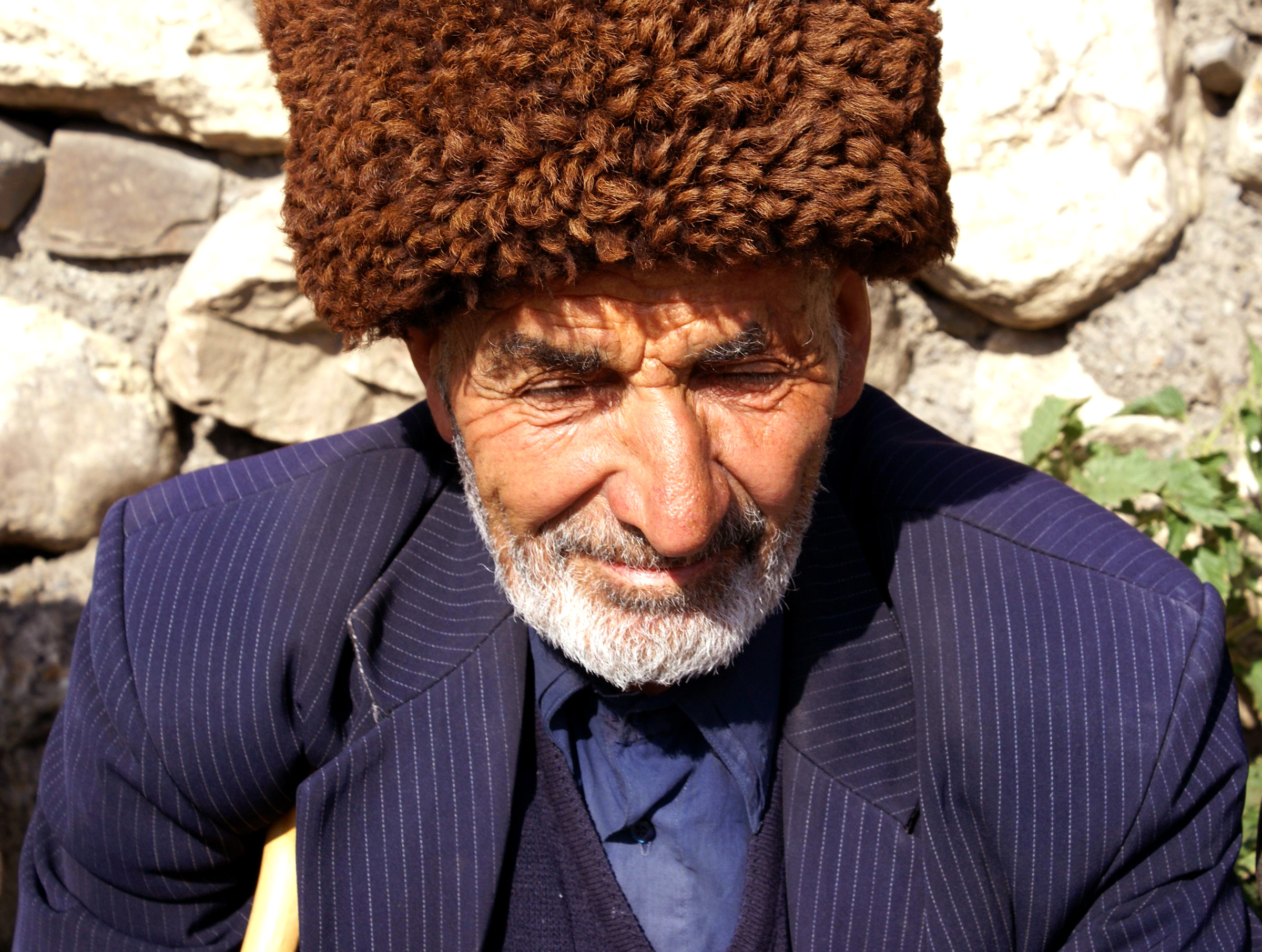
Khinalugian Suleyman 2007

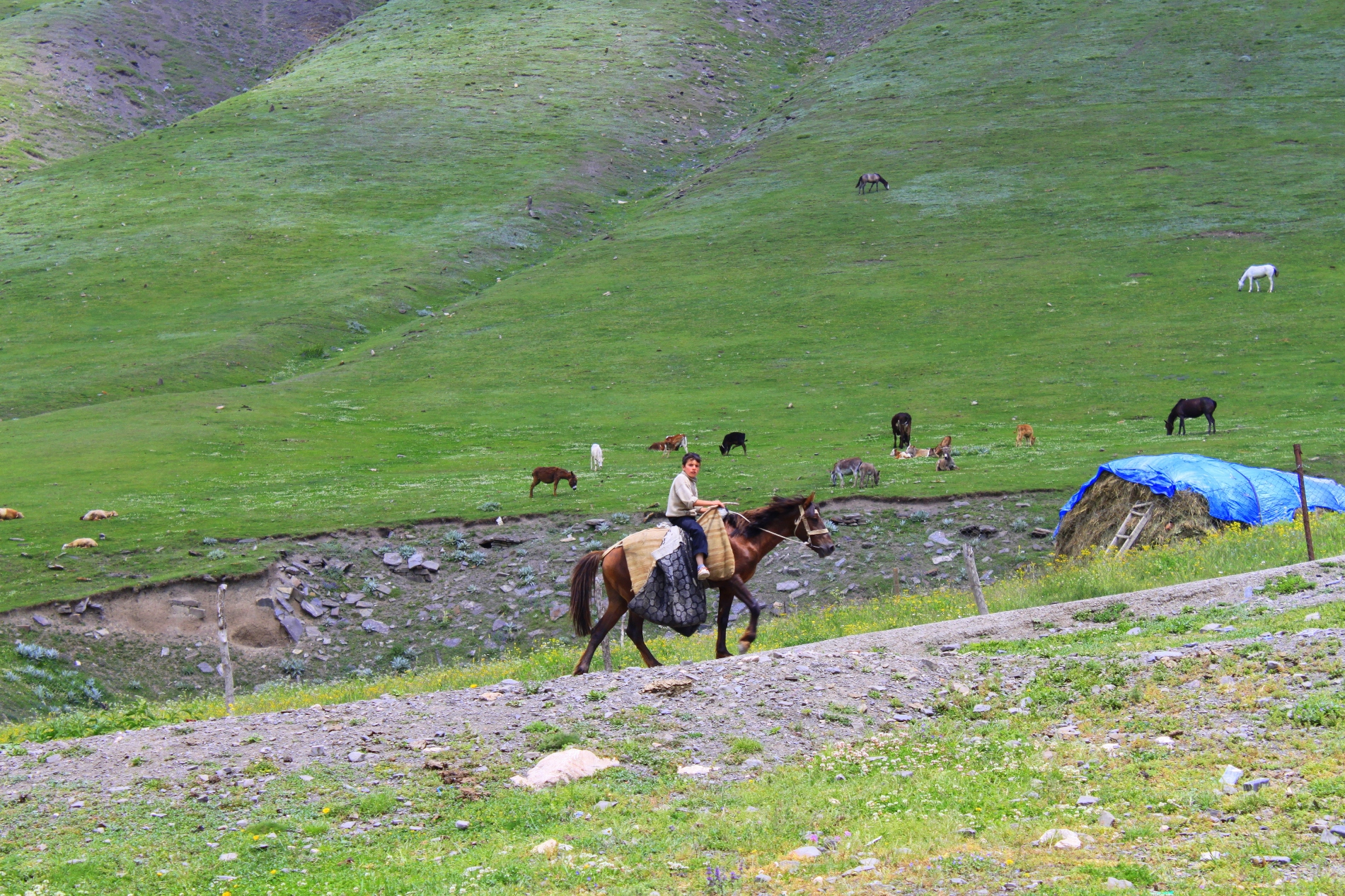
Khinalug resident of Quba District

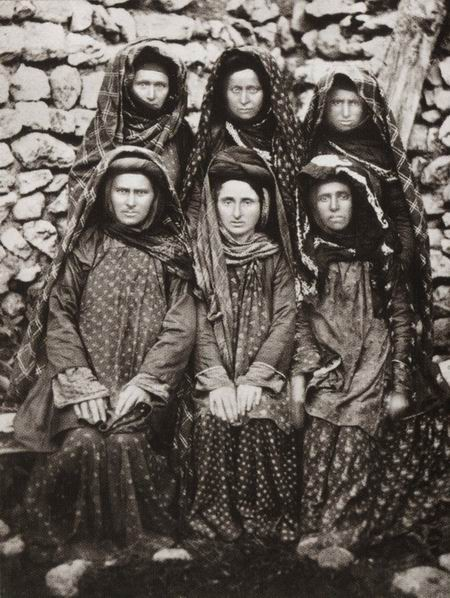
Budukh women from the village of Buduq

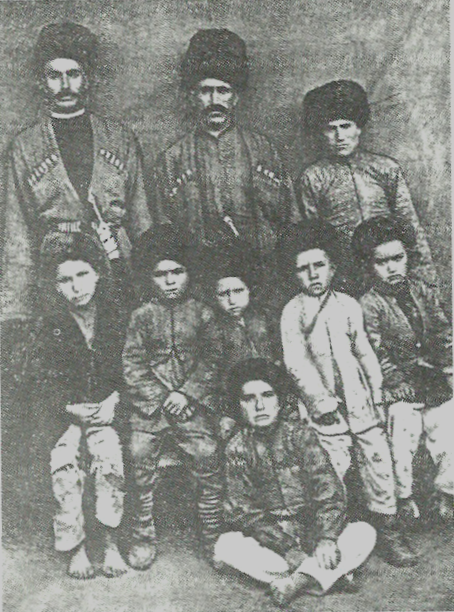
Buduq village at the beginning of the 20th century
