= Khinalug people =

Northeast Caucasian ethnic group

Khinalugs
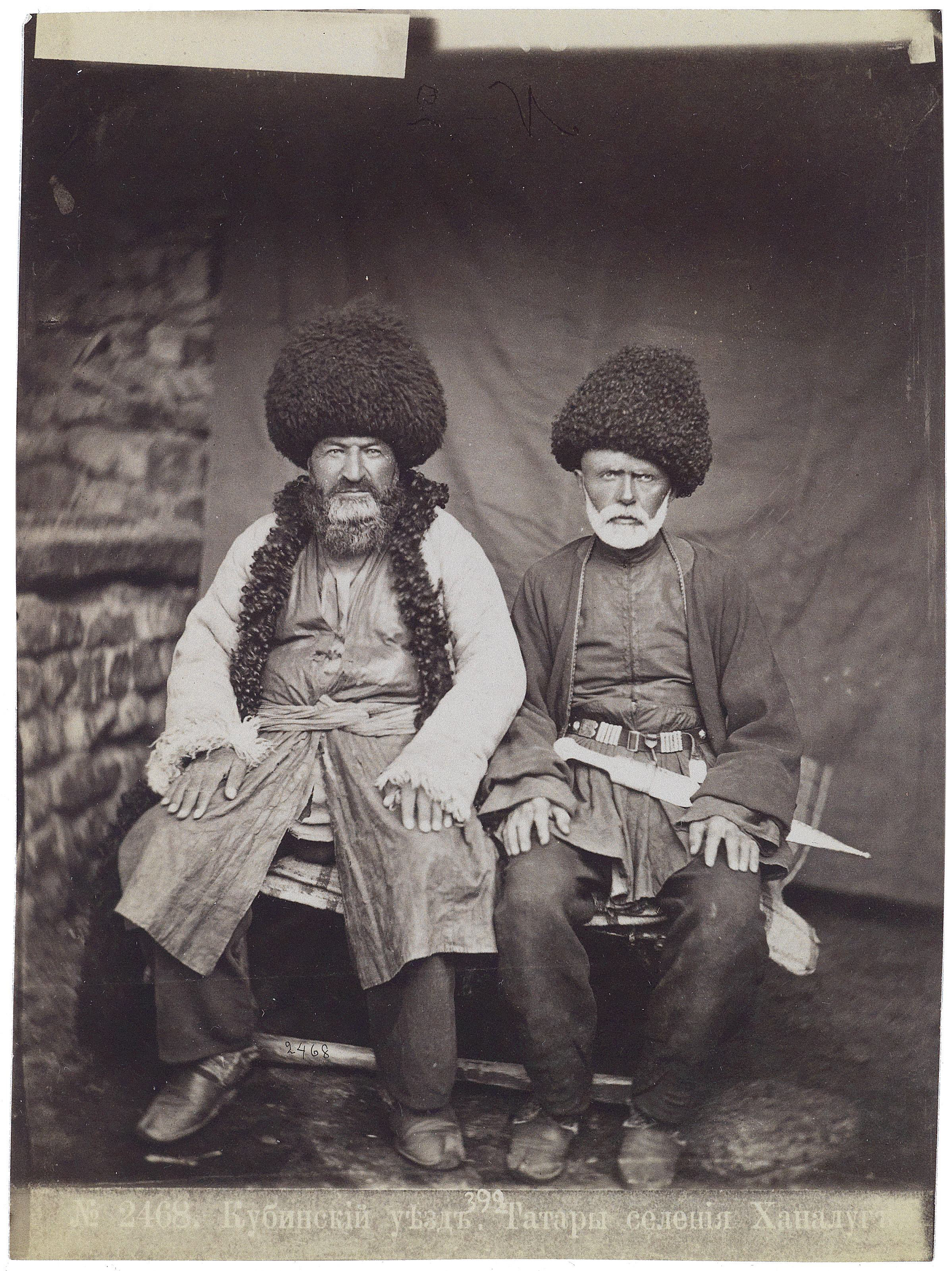

Total population
- 2,233 (2009, census)

Regions with significant populations
- Quba District: 2,177
- Khachmaz District: 36
- Qusar District: 20

Languages
- Khinalug; Azerbaijani

Religion
- Sunni Islam

Related ethnic groups
- Other Northeast Caucasian peoples, especially other Shahdagh peoples

The Khinalugs (Azerbaijani: Xınalıqlılar, Khinalugh: кеттитурдур, кетш халх) are an indigenous people of Azerbaijan that speak the Khinalug language, a Northeast Caucasian language. The Khinalugs are indigenous to the Quba District and have been named after their main village, Khinalug. They are one of the peoples that have traditionally been called Shahdagh (together with Budukh, Jek, and Kryts people).

== History ==
The first written information about the Khinalug people is from the 18th century. Because there is no information about their history, it is impossible to study their ethnogenesis. There were some attempts to identify an ethnogenetical relation between the Khinalug people and the tribes of Caucasian Albania.

A. Geybullaev considered the endonym ketid to be related to the name of one of the Caucasian Albanian tribes, ket/gat.

Another attempt was made by Anatoly Novoseltsev. He wrote: "Of those (i.e. tribes mentioned in Ashkharatsuyts—N.d.R), I think, the most interesting are Khenuks (Khenuts), i.e. obviously, Khinalugs, who retained as an independent ethnic component in the north of Azerbaijan even today". According to N. G. Volkova, such an approach in determining ethnogenetical relations is hardly acceptable as Anatoly Novoseltsev's theory proceeds from a resemblance of two ethnonyms. Another scientist, R. M. Magomedov, considered that Khenoks are Rutuls.

The first mention of the Khinalug toponym is in the works of Yaqut al-Hamawi in the 18th century as Khinaluk. The first information about the Khinalug people is also from the 18th century. In the 18th century, they were an "independent community" (jamaat) and at first, the community was a subject of the Shirvan Khanate and later the Quba Khanate. Although being a subject of the Shirvan Khanate, unlike the rest of the population, they were free of any obligations and taxes, except military service.

During the First All-Union Census of the Soviet Union in 1926 there were 105 Khinalugs in Azerbaijan. Already then part of the Khinalugs considered themselves to be Azerbaijanis both by self-identification and by language. In the 1960s they were offered to be resettled in the lowlands of the Quba district, but they refused. For a long time they have not appeared in any census. They were recorded in the 2009 Azerbaijani census.

== Language ==
Khinalug language is a Northeast Caucasian language, either forming its own sub-branch or as a member of the Lezgic languages. Russian orientalist I. N. Berezin, who traveled in South Caucasus in 1840s wrote: "It is said that in the Quba Khanate, there are living antiquities. They are the people of Khinalug, who speak a non-human or at least non-local language, that is understood neither by people of Quba, nor by Lezgins". Anatoliy Genko who visited Khinalug in 1926, speculated about the closeness of Khinalug with the Udi language.

As Khinalug language is spoken only in one settlement, it has no dialects. But some phonetic differences noticed in the speech of the upper, middle and lower parts of the settlement. It is an unwritten language. But in 1991 "ХӀикмаьти чаьлаьнг" in Khinalug language (in Cyrillic script) was published in Baku. It has been taught in the primary school in 1993-1999, but later was discontinued. The reason is believed to be parents' great interest in good reading and writing abilities of their children in the Azerbaijani language.

In 2007 a new alphabet based on Latin script was adopted.

== Religion ==
Khinalugs are overwhelmingly Sunni Muslims. According to a legend, they converted to Islam in the mosque Jomard (Gomard) or Abu Muslim located in their settlement. Beside Eid al-Fitr and Eid al-Adha, they also celebrate Nowruz.
