= Kryts people =

Kryts Хърыцӏаь
Total population
- c. 10,000–15,000 (2005)

Regions with significant populations
- Azerbaijan: 4,400 (2009)

Languages
- Kryts, Azeri

Religion
- Sunni Islam

Related ethnic groups
- Shahdagh people and Northeast Caucasian peoples

The Kryts (self-designated хърыцӏаь) or Gryz (Azerbaijani: qrızlar) are a people of Azerbaijan who reside in several villages in the Quba, Khachmaz, Ismayilli and Gabala regions, as well as in the cities of Baku and Sumgait. They are one of the peoples that have traditionally been called Shahdagh (along with the Budukh people and Khinalug people).

In 2005, the number of Kryts was between 10,000 and 15,000. They speak the Kryts language, which belongs to the Lezgic branch of the Nakh-Dagestan language family. In addition, all speak the Azerbaijani language.

== Demographics ==
The number of Kryts according to H. Seidlitz, extracted from family lists in 1886, was 7,767 people. In "The Sociolinguistic Situation of the Kryts in Azerbaijan" it was reported that the number of Kryts was between 10,000 and 15,000.

== History ==
The area the Kryts inhabit was once part of the Shirvan Khanate during the 18th century but then became part of the Kuba Khanate by the end of the century. The region was annexed into the Russian empire in 1806. During Soviet rule, the authorities imposed themselves into Kryt society, fully eliminating the autonomy the Kryt have historically enjoyed. Traditional beliefs and lifestyles valued by the Kryts underwent rapid change during this period as well.

== Lifestyle and culture ==
Their main occupation is raising livestock; agriculture and horticulture are of secondary importance. In the development of crafts, they occupy manufacture carpets, rugs and woolen patterned socks.

The Kryts are predominantly Sunni Muslims.
