= Budukh people =

Northeast Caucasian ethnic group

Budukh Будад – Budad
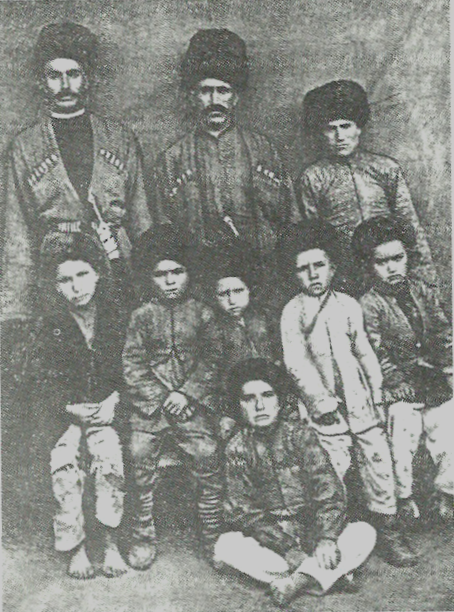

Total population
- approx. 1,000

Regions with significant populations
- Azerbaijan: 1,000

Languages
- Budukh, Azerbaijani

Religion
- Sunni Islam

Related ethnic groups
- Jeks, Kryts, Lezgins, Khinalugs, other Shahdaghs, and other Northeast Caucasian peoples.

The Budukhs (Budukh: Будад, Budad), (Azerbaijani: Buduqlular) are an ethnic group primarily from the mountainous village of Buduq in northeastern Azerbaijan, one of the Shahdagh peoples. They speak the Budukh language, which is a Northeast Caucasian language of the Lezgic branch. The Azerbaijani language is widely spoken.

== History ==
The area where the Budukh inhabit was part of the Shirvanshah. The Budukh served in the military for the Shah but were given tax and tribute exemptions. In the early 18th century, the Budukh participated in a Sunni-Shia conflict taking place in Shirvan. However, the conflict soon transformed into a revolt against the Shah which also gained the attention of the Ottomans and Safavids. During the late 18th century, the Budukhs were part of the Khuba Khanate but then became incorporated into the Russian Empire in 1806.

The Budukhs participated in the Murid War during the mid-19th century. In the Soviet era, the Budukh were faced with collectivization and various socio-political policies that negatively affected their traditional way of life and beliefs.

== Culture ==
The Badukhs traditionally engage in raising sheep and cattle. The Badukhs also engage in trading and some limited farming, mainly cultivating barely and rye.

The Budukh people are overwhelmingly Sunni Muslims.
