= Jek language =

Northeast Caucasian language of Azerbaijan

Jek
- Cekcə məz цIека meз c’eka mez
- Native to: Azerbaijan
- Region: Quba
- Ethnicity: Jek people
- Native speakers: (undated figure of 1,500–11,000)
- Language family: Northeast Caucasian: Lezgic; Samur; Southern Samur; Kryts; Jek
- Writing system: Cyrillic

Language codes
- ISO 639-3: kry – inclusive code Individual code: kry
- Glottolog: dzhe1238

A speaker of Jek language, recorded in Germany.

Cek, also known as Jek or Dzhek, is a Northeast Caucasian language spoken by about 1,500 to 11,000 Jek people in the village of Jek in the mountains of northern Azerbaijan.

The Jek language is not a written language and Azeri serves as the literary language of the Jek, as well as all Shahdagh peoples.
