= Kryts language =

Samur language of Azerbaijan

Kryts
- Kryc
- кърыцIаь мез ġrəċä mez/qryc’ä mez цIека meз ċeka mez/c’eka mez Йергуьж мез
- Pronunciation: [ɢrɨts’æ mɛz]
- Native to: Azerbaijan
- Region: Quba Rayon
- Ethnicity: Kryts people
- Native speakers: 5,000 (2007)
- Language family: Northeast Caucasian: Lezgic; Samur; Southern Samur; Kryts
- Dialects: Kryts; Jek; Khaput; Yergyudzh; Alyk

Language codes
- ISO 639-3: kry
- Glottolog: kryt1240
- ELP: Kryts
- Kryts

- Kryts is classified as Severely Endangered by the UNESCO Atlas of the World's Languages in Danger

Kryts (Kryc) is a Lezgic language of the Northeast Caucasian language family spoken in parts of the Quba Rayon of Azerbaijan by 6,000 people in 1975. Its dialects are Kryts, Jek, Khaput, Yergyudzh, and Alyk, which are all quite distinct to the point of only partial mutual intelligibility, therefore they could also be considered separate languages in a dialect continuum.

Kryts is endangered, classified as "severely endangered" by UNESCO's Atlas of the World's Languages in Danger.

== Phonology ==
=== Consonants ===
		Labial	Alveolar	Palatal	Velar			Uvular			Pharyngeal/ Epiglottal	Glottal
		Labial	Alveolar	Palatal	plain	lab.	pal.	plain	lab.	pal.	Pharyngeal/ Epiglottal	Glottal
Stop	voiceless	p	t		k	kʷ	kʲ	q	qʷ	qʲ		ʔ
Stop	ejective	pʼ	tʼ		kʼ	kʷʼ	kʲʼ	qʼ	qʷʼ	qʲʼ		
Stop	voiced	b	d		ɡ	ɡʷ		(ɢ)				
Affricate	voiceless		(t͡s)	t͡ʃ								
Affricate	ejective		t͡sʼ	t͡ʃʼ								
Affricate	voiced		(d͡z)	d͡ʒ								
Fricative	voiceless	f	s	ʃ	x			χ			(ʜ)	h
Fricative	voiced	v	z	ʒ	ɣ			ʁ	ʁʷ		ʕ	
Nasal		m	n									
Trill			r									
Approximant			l	j								

- /ʁ/ may also be realized as [ɢ] or [qː], in complementary distribution.
- Sounds /t͡s, d͡z/ only occur in other dialects of the language.
- /h/ may vary from a glottal sound to an epiglottal fricative /ʜ/.

=== Vowels ===
	Front	Central	Back
Close	i	(ɨ)	u
Mid	e		
Open		a	

- /i/ can be heard as [ɨ], in free variation
- The four vowels may also be pharyngealized as /iˤ, uˤ, eˤ, aˤ/.

== Orthography ==
In 2020, a dictionary was published in the Khaput variety, using the Latin script.

A a	B b	C c	Ç ç	Ç' ç'	D d	E e	Ә ә	F f	G g	Ğ ğ	Ğ' ğ'
H h	H' h'	Ĥ ĥ	X x	X' x'	J j	İ i	I ı	K k	K' k'	Q q	Q' q'
Q̂ q̂	L l	M m	N n	O o	Ö ö	P p	P' p'	R r	S s	Ş ş	S' s'
T t	U u	Ü ü	V v	Y y	Z z
