= Budukh language =

Language belonging to the Lezgic group of the Northeast Caucasian language family

Budukh
- Будад мез Budad mez
- Pronunciation: [budanu mɛz]
- Native to: Azerbaijan
- Region: Quba Rayon
- Ethnicity: 1,000 Budukhs (1990)
- Native speakers: 200 (2010)
- Language family: Northeast Caucasian: Lezgic; Samur; Southern Samur; Budukh
- Writing system: Latin script

Language codes
- ISO 639-3: bdk
- Glottolog: budu1248
- ELP: Budukh
- Budukh

- Budukh is classified as Severely Endangered by the UNESCO Atlas of the World's Languages in Danger

Budukh or Budugh (Будад мез, Budad mez) is a Lezgic language of the Northeast Caucasian language family spoken in parts of the Quba Rayon of Azerbaijan. It is spoken by about 200 of approximately 1,000 ethnic Budukhs.

Budukh is a severely endangered language, and classified as such by UNESCO's Atlas of the World's Languages in Danger.

== Orthography ==
There are two orthographies for Budukh, and it is beginning to be introduced into schools. The orthography takes the following form:

A a	Ä ä	B b	C c	Ç ç	Ç' ç'	D d	E e
Ә ә	F f	G g	Ğ ğ	Ğh ğh	H h	Hh hh	X x
Xh xh	I ı	İ i	J j	K k	K' k'	Q q	Q' q'
Qh qh	L l	M m	N n	O o	Ö ö	P p	P' p'
R r	S s	Ş ş	T t	T' t'	Ts' ts'	U u	Ü ü
V v	Y y	Z z	'

The Buduq Picture Dictionary by Adigözəl Hacıyev, published in 2017, uses a slightly different orthography:

A a	Ä ä	B b	C c	Ç ç	Ç' ç'	D d	E e
Ә ә	F f	G g	Ğ ğ	H h	Ħ ħ	I ı	İ i
J j	K k	K' k'	L l	M m	N n	O o	Ö ö
P p	P' p'	Q q	Q' q'	Qh qh	R r	S s	Ş ş
T t	T' t'	Ts' ts'	U u	Ü ü	V v	X x	Xh xh
Y y	Z z	ˁ	'	˚

The Budud dili school manual by Adigözəl Hacıyev, published in 2025, uses another revision.

A a	Ä ä	B b	C c	Ç ç	Çˊ çˊ	D d	E e
Ә ә	F f	G g	Ğ ğ	H h	Hˊ hˊ	Hˊˊ hˊˊ	İ i
I ı	J j	K k	Kˊ kˊ	L l	M m	N n	O o
Ö ö	P p	Pˊ pˊ	Q q	Qˊ qˊ	Qh qh	R r	S s
Sˊ sˊ	Ş ş	T t	Tˊ tˊ	U u	Ü ü	V v	X x
Xˊ xˊ	Y y	Z z	ˊ	˚

== Grammar ==
=== Gender and agreement ===
Authier (2010) reports that Budugh has six 'gender-number' classes:

- human masculine,
- human adult feminine,
- animate (which includes animals, plants, and non-adult human females, as well as some abstract nouns),
- inanimate,
- nonhuman plural,
- human plural.

Verbs normally agree with their absolutive argument (intransitive subject or transitive object) in gender. In the following examples, the verb 'beat' shows animate agreement with 'donkey' and non-human plural agreement with 'donkeys'.

Ma'lla'-cır lem ğùvotu-ri
Mullah-ERG donkey ANIM:beat:PRES
'Mullah beat the donkey'

Ma'lla'-cır lemér ğùtu-ri
Mullah-ERG donkey NHUM.PL:beat:PRES
'Mullah beat the donkeys'

Compare these examples with the following, where the verb agrees with the intransitive subject:

Ma'lla' vìxhici
Mullah M:go:NARR
'Mullah went.'

Lem vüxhücü
donkey ANIM:go:NARR
'The donkey went.'

=== Verb agreement ===
Budukh verbs typically agree with a single argument, the absolutive. In the agreement paradigms, the majority of verbs show no overt agreement for the masculine, neuter, and nonhuman plural. Consider the following paradigm for the verb 'keep' in the perfective (Authier 2009):

M/N/NPL	ˤa-q-a
F	ˤa-ra-q-a
A	ˤa-va-q-a
HPL	ˤa-ba-q-a

In this paradigm, /ˤa/ is a preverb which must appear with the verb root /q/ 'keep', and the agreement morphology appears between the preverb and the root. Due to historical changes, the relationships between the various members of an agreement paradigm are often more complex and show changes of vowel and/or consonant. The following perfective paradigm for 'go' shows this (with the reconstructed form shown after the *)

M	vi-xhi
F	v-r-xhi
A	vüxhü < *vi-v-xhi
N/NPL	vidki < *vi-d-xhi
HPL	vibki < *vi-b-xhi

=== Word order ===
Budukh is an SOV language, as seen in the following example:

Ma'lla'-cır lemér ğùtu-ri
Mullah-ERG donkey NHUM.PL:beat:PRES
'Mullah beat the donkeys'

It has possessors before possessed nouns:

Mallá-co rij
Mullah-ADLOC daughter
'the mullah's daughter'

Adjectives appear before the nouns that they modify:

q'usú Mallá'
old mullah
'the old mullah'
