= Lezgic languages =

Northeast Caucasian language family

Lezgic
- Geographic distribution: Dagestan; Azerbaijan
- Linguistic classification: Northeast Caucasian: Lezgic
- Proto-language: Proto-Lezgic language
- Subdivisions: Archi (Peripheral Lezgic); Samur (Nuclear Lezgic); ? Khinalug

Language codes
- Glottolog: lezg1248
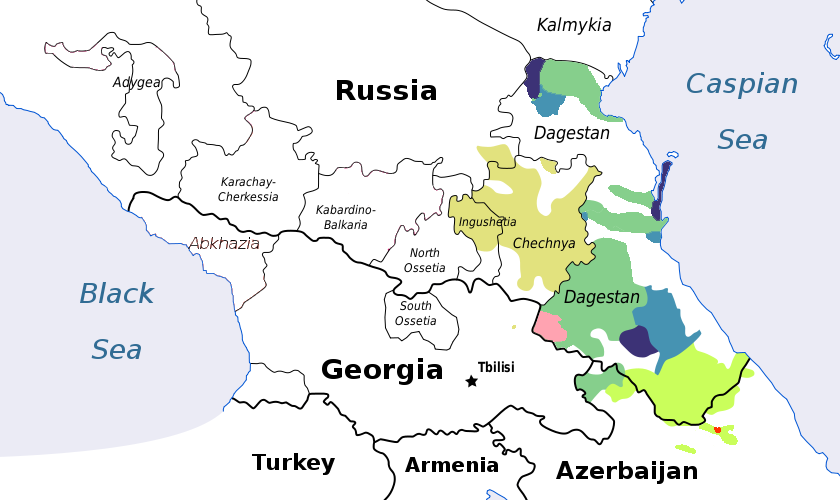
- Lezgic

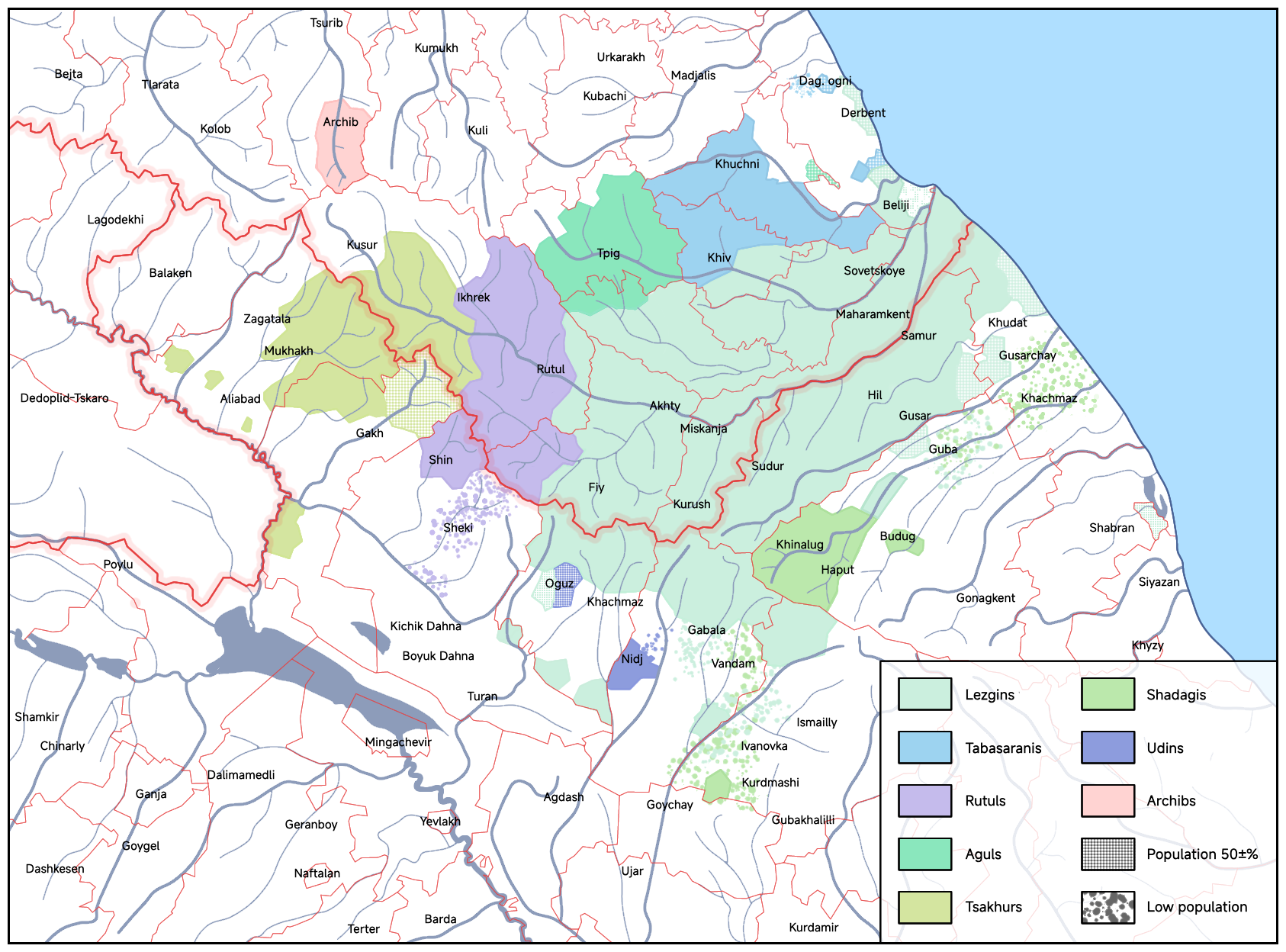
- Map of individual distribution of Lezgic languages

The Lezgic languages are one of seven branches of the Northeast Caucasian language family, spoken primarily by the Lezgin ethnic groups.

Lezgin languages are spoken by some 1 million people.

== Classification ==
The languages of minor Lezgic peoples demonstrate a distinct convergence toward the standardized Lezgin literary language. Lezgin, Aghul, Rutul, Tabasaran, Tsakhur and Udi are literary languages. Khinalug may either be Lezgic or an independent branch of the Northeast Caucasian family.

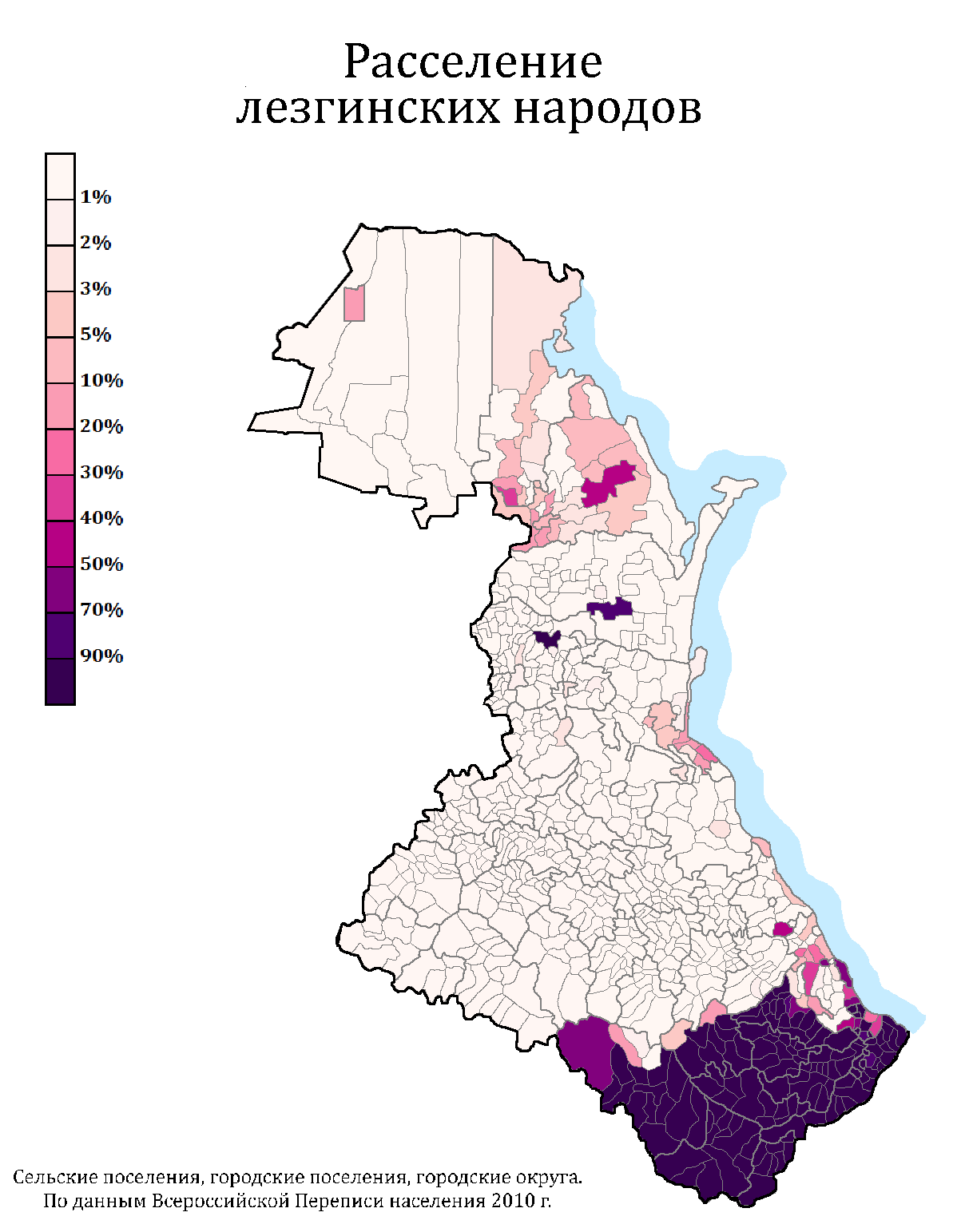
- Lezgin ethnic groups in Dagestan
  Peripheral: Archi – 1,700 speakers
- Samur (Nuclear Lezgic)
  - Eastern Samur
    - Caucasian Albanian † – extinct
      - Udi – 6,600 speakers
    - Lezgin–Aghul–Tabasaran
      - Lezgin – 800,000 speakers
      - Aghul – 33,200 speakers
      - Tabasaran – 87, 214 speakers
  - Southern Samur
    - Kryts – 5,000 speakers
    - Budukh – 200 speakers
    - Jek – 1,500 speakers
  - Western Samur
    - Rutul – 36,400 speakers
    - Tsakhur – 22,300 speakers

== The voicing of ejective consonants ==
The Lezgic languages are relevant to the glottalic theory of Indo-European, because several have undergone the voicing of ejectives that have been postulated but widely derided as improbable in that family. The correspondences have not been well worked out (Rutul is inconsistent in the examples), but a few examples are:

- Non-Lezgic: Avar tstsʼar; Lezgic: Rutul dur, Tsakhur do 'name'
- Non-Lezgic: Archi motʃʼor, Lak tʃʼiri; Lezgic: Rutul mitʃʼri, Tabassaran midʒir, Aɡul mudʒur 'beard'
- Non-Lezgic: Avar motsʼ; Lezgic: Tabassaran vaz 'moon'

A similar change has taken place in non-initial position in the Nakh languages.

== Vocabulary comparison ==
Lezgic languages
	Eastern Lezgi					Southern Lezgi			Western Lezgi		Peripheral	
	C. Alban (extinct)	Lezgi	Agul	Tabasaran	Udi	Budukh	Jek	Kryts	Rutul	Tsakhur	Archi	Khinalug
I	zow	zun	zun	uzu	zu	zyn	zyn	zyn	zy	zy	zon	zy
you	wun	vun	chun	uvu	hun	vyn	vun	vun	vy	hu	un	vy
we	žan	chun	hin	uhu	yan	yin	jin	zin	ji	shi	nenttu	kin
all	vari	vari	vari	vari	vari	pitin	vari	vari	vari	gyrgyn	hunniybu	chinel
one	sa	sad	sad	sab	sa	sad	sab	sar	sa	sa	os	sa
family	xza	xizan	xizan	xizan	kulfet	yeba	haile	kalfat	xizan	xizan	xizan	aile

	Lezgin	Agul	Tabasaran	Rutul	Tsakhur
head	ḱil (кIил)	ḱil (кIил)	ḱul (кIул)	ḱul (кIул)	kalle (калле)
jacket	valçağ (валчагъ)	valçag (валчаг)	valjağ (валжагъ)	valçağ (валчагъ)	valçağ (валчаг)
summit	ḱuḱ (кIукI)	ḱuḱ (кIукI)	ḱaḱ (кIакI)	ḱul (кIул)	ḱol (кIол)
montain	suv (сув)	suv (сув)	siv (сив)	siv (сив)	suva (сува)
girl	ruş (руш)	ruş (руш)	riş (риш)	reş (реш)	nım (ным)
bridegroom	ččam (ччам)	čam (чам)	jam (жам)	jam (жам)	čama (чама)
dwelling	ḱwal (кIвал)	xal (хал)	xal (хал)	xal (хал)	xav (хав)
land	ččil (ччил)	čil (чил)	jil (жил)	naḉ (начь)	jdil (ждил)
winter	q́üd (кьуьд)	ğurd (гIурд)	qürd (къюрд)	q́üd (кьуьд)	q́udum (кьудум)
goat	c̣eh (цIегь)	c̣eh (цIегь)	c̣ih (цIигь)	c̣i (цIи)	c̣e (цIеь)
ice	murk (мурк)	murk (мурк)	mirkḱ (миркк)	meḱ (мекI)	muk (мук)
shovel	qusu (къусу)	ḱiṭa (кIитIа)	q́ursi (кьурси)	ber (бер)	bel (бел)
mill	reh (регь)	rax̣ (рахъ)	rağmi (рагъIми)	räh (рэх)	yoha (йоха)
meat	yak (як)	yaḱ (йакI)	yikk (иикк)	yak (йак)	çuru (чуру)
bride	swas (свас)	sus (сус)	şwuşw (швушв)	swas (свас)	istax (истах)
horn	karç (карч)	ḱarç (кIарч)	ḱarç (кIарч)	kaç (кач)	ğaç (гъач)
fire	c̣ay (цIай)	c̣ay (цIай)	c̣a (цIа)	c̣ay (цIай)	c̣a (цIа)
eagle	leḳ (лекь)	luḱ (лукI)	lüḱ (люкь)	leg (лег)	ḱatir (кьатир)
language	mez (мез)	mez (мез)	mez (мез)	miz (миз)	miz (миз)

== See also ==
- Lezgin language
- Lezgin ethnic groups
- Languages of the Caucasus
- Northeast Caucasian languages
