= Külüllü =

Kululu may refer to several places in Azerbaijan:

- Külüllü, Agsu (also Gülüllü and Kyulyulyu), a village in the Agsu Rayon
- Külüllü, Ismailli, a village in the municipality of İvanovka in the Ismailli Rayon
- Külüllü, Khizi, a village in the Khizi Rayon
