= Ivanovka, Azerbaijan =

Ivanovka
- Municipality
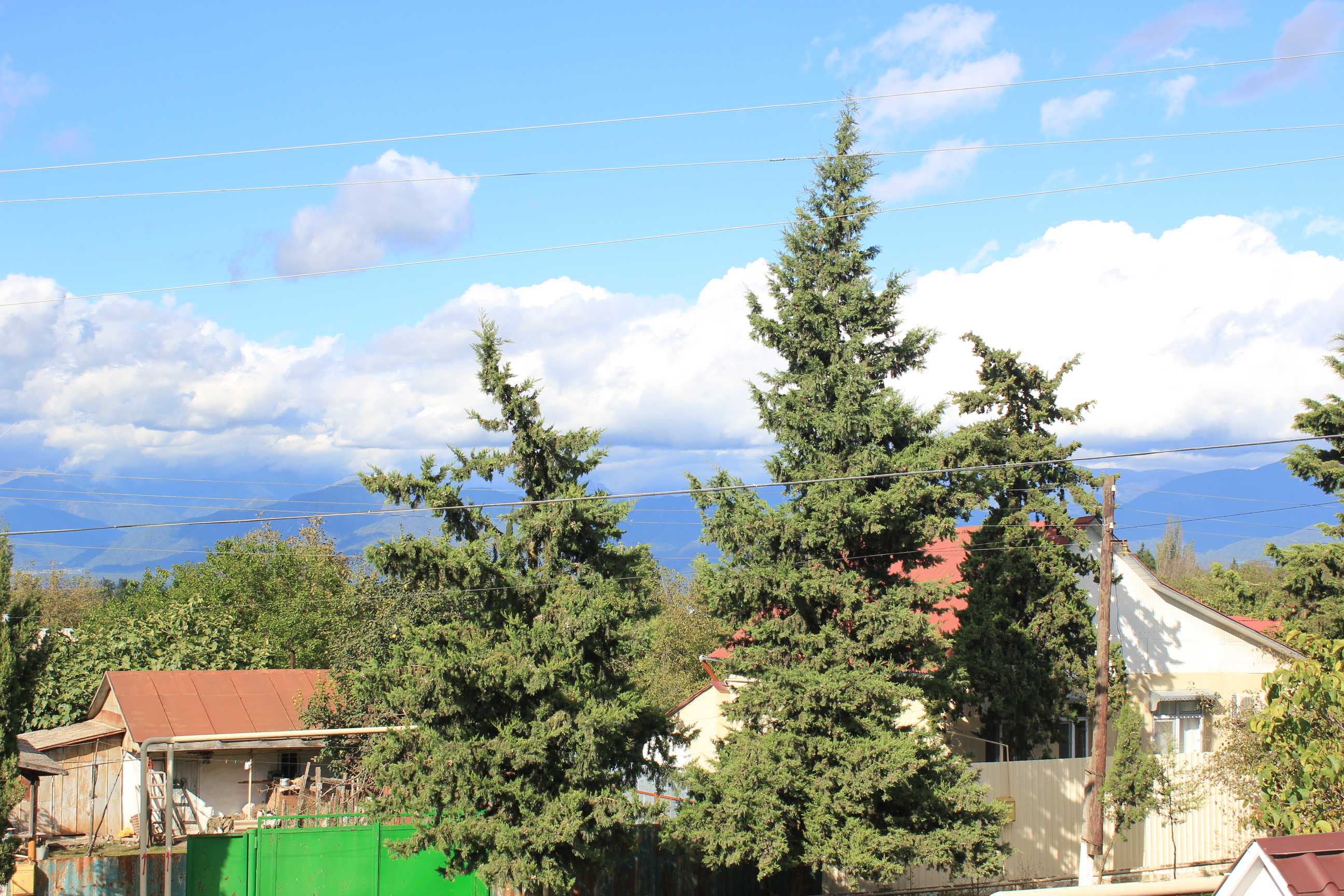

- Location within Azerbaijan
- Coordinates: 40°44′50″N 48°01′59″E
- Country: Azerbaijan
- District: Ismailli

Population
  - Total: 3,303
- Time zone: UTC+4 (AZT)
- Website: ivanovka.net

Ivanovka (Russian: Ивановка) is a village and municipality in the Ismailli District of Azerbaijan. It is at a height of 848 m (2,782 ft) above sea level, 13 km (8.1 mi) from Ismailli region. The municipality consists of the villages of İvanovka and Külüllü.

This was the largest of about a dozen villages in Azerbaijan with a significant population belonging to the Russian ethnic religious community of Spiritual Christian Molokans. Before 2025, this was the last functioning Russian kolkhoz (collective farm) from Soviet times.

== History ==
The village was founded in 1834 by Russian peasants, predominantly Molokans from central Russia, that had been resettled in the Caucasus by Tsar Nicholas I in the years following the Treaty of Turkmenchay at the end of the Russo-Persian War (1826–1828). Further Russian peasants migrated to the area over time. These were mostly Spiritual Christian – Molokane, from Central Russia, the Volga, and Novorossiya. In 1840, the village was named Ivanovka after Ivan Pershiy who first scouted and approved this site.

In 1936, three artel joined into one kolkhoz (collective farm).

In 1971, the leader of collective farm Nikolay Nikitin got the award of “Hero of Socialist Labor”. Under his leadership, Ivanovka's collective farm became one of the biggest in the Republic. In 1995, collective farm was renamed in name of Nikitin, and was the only remaining collective farm im Azerbaijan.

By 2025 all the agricultural businesses were conficated by tycoons in a secret negotiation with the president's office, and about half of the population moved.

== Culture ==
The first Russian houses in this area were built in 1834. Molokan families came to this area to follow their own form of Spiritual Christianity and to maintain their religion.

The local people who were deported from Russia speak Azerbaijani, while Russian remains their mother tongue. Their most famous meal is called Lapsha – a type of pasta noodles. Lapsha is eaten at every local activity, including at wedding and on holidays. The majority of the folksongs of the Ivanovka Russian group are dedicated to the beauty of nature of this village.

There are some new buildings: a school, library, hospital, kindergarten, maternity home, electronic telephone/internet system (ATS), and a culture hall with an auditorium, museum and library. A youth orchestra performed in the culture centre.

=== House of culture ===
In the house of culture, various events such as weddings, presentations, celebrations are held. In 2018 president has signed a decree of renovating the house of culture. 2.5 million were allocated for a renovation.

The museum displays village heroes, clothes, tools, furniture, ceramic dishes, tools, books, photos.

=== Houses of Prayer ===
There is no Orthodox "church" nor Moslem mosque in the village. But there are two sectarian congregation meeting halls. The largest is the Spiritual Christian Molokan prayer-meeting house (molitvenie dom, sobranie) with an adjacent dining hall, located on an alley about 300 feet north of the town center (intersetion of Kalinin and Sadovaya streets) and 300 feet east of the main Kalinin street. Guests are welcome during services. A more recent Pentecostal congregation meets on the east edge of town, near the end of Krasnoarmeyskaya Street.

=== Molokans ===
Since 1992, the Spiritual Christian Molokan religion had been internationally registered in Russia. Before the 1917 Revolution it was officially recognized about 1765 in Central Russia when it was labeled with the heresy of eating dairy products (molochnaya) during the approximate 200 Orthdox fasting days, especially during the Great Fast.

Spiritual Christian history evolved in parallel with the Protestant Reformation in Europe. Freed Russian peasants resisted about 90% of the Orthodox church rituals, keeping the essentails which they determined complied with the Bible. Molokane named themselves Spiritual Christians.

Like other Spiritual Christians in Russia, and Protestants, Mokokane are often defined by what they oppose. They do not use priests, crosses, churches (cathedral, temples), icons, candles, saints, holy water, or fasts; and forbid pork, alcohol, smoking, and narcotics.

They do sing Psalms from the Bible, and worship God "in spirit and truth". They do prepare huge feasts for holidays, funerals, weddings, and christenings. Ouside guests may be tired by their long slow services, and about a dozen prayers in which all able-bodied members stand, kneel and bow to the floor many times.

The Ivanovka congregation does not use a prayer rug as often used by other congregations. Benches are cushioned with thin long pads, and many small square cushions are used when kneeling.

In 2025 Ivanovka was the largest Molokan congregation, with others to the east mountains. One congregation persists in Baku, and about 2 are in the southern mountians bordering Armenia. There may be about 10 active congregations left in all of Azerbaijan.

== Education ==
The school operating in Ivanovka has a capacity of 783 people. Most of the students are studying in the Russian language.

== Demographics ==
The population is 2720. In 2025 the number of houses owned by Russians decreased about half, from about 1400 to 700, due to tycoons taking ownership of the entire farming operation. All fled to Russia and left hundreds of homes for sale.

== Economics ==
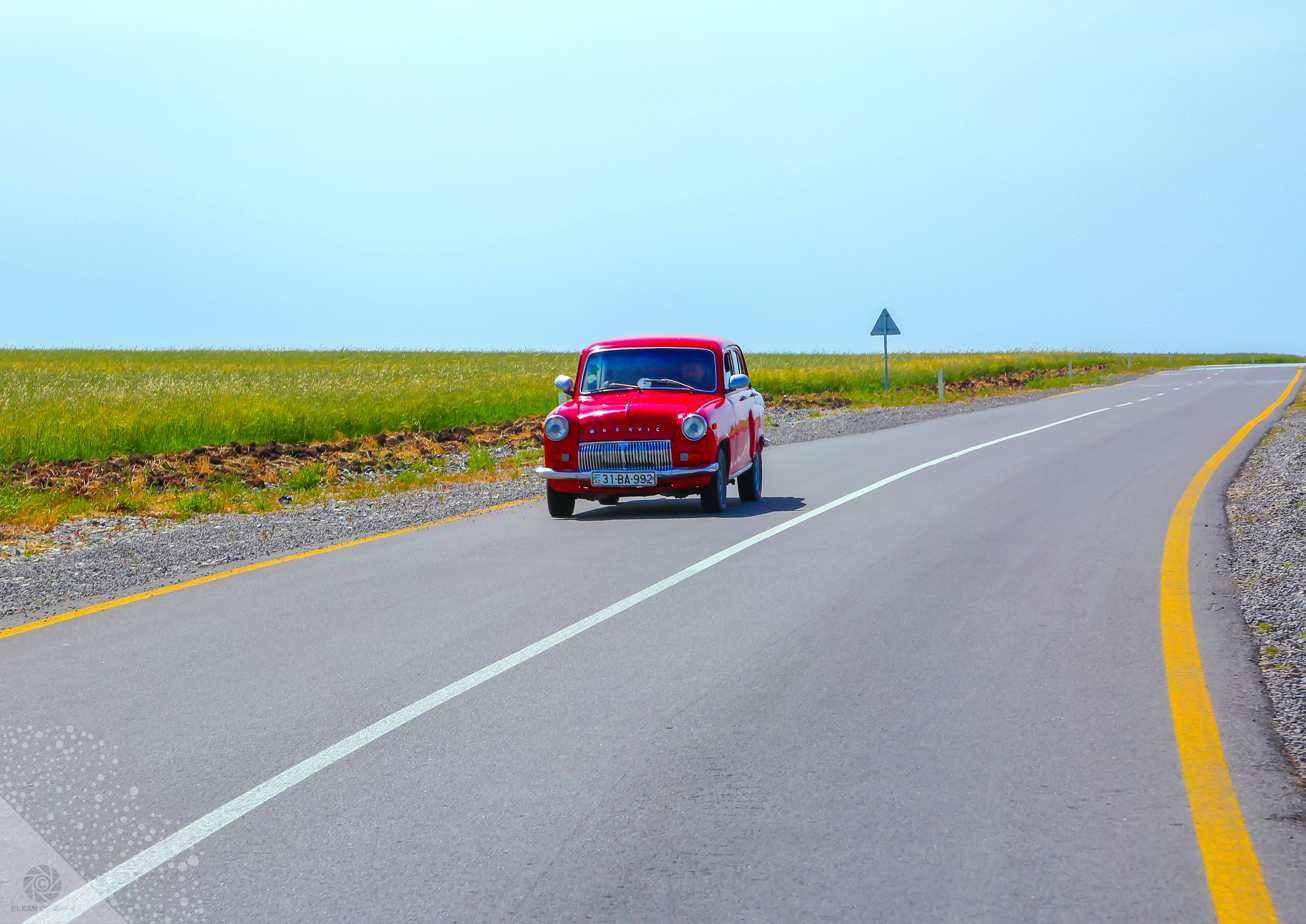
Road in Ivanovka

Agriculture accounts for the main business of the population, and the local Kolkhoz is still in good use. The crops that are cultivated are mostly grapes, wheat, sunflowers, and peas. Livestock are also reared (beef-breeding, pig-breeding, poultry), and cheese is produced for the local market.

There are some parks, workshops, and factories (e.g. a Tiling factory).

In 2025 the entire farms was politically taken from the residents by tycoons. All residents who wish to continue working have to sign an agreement with the new owners to not protest. The number of dairy cows was reduced from over 4000 to about 40 count in June. All other farm animals were gone.

== See also ==
- Lahij
- Kulullu
- Khinalug
- Azerbaijan–Russia relations
