= Qalayxudat =

Galaykhudat
- Azerbaijani: Qalayxudat
- Location within Azerbaijan
- Coordinates: 41°12′02″N 48°10′55″E
- Country: Azerbaijan
- District: Quba
- Municipality: Khinalug
- Time zone: UTC+4 (AZT)
  - Summer (DST): UTC+5 (AZT)

Qalayxudat (also, Galaykhudat, Galakhudat, Kalaykhudat, and Kaleykhudat) is a village in the Quba District of Azerbaijan. The village forms part of the municipality of Khinalug.
