= Historical-ethnographic museum of Khinalug village =

Museum in the Quba Rayon of Azerbaijan

Coordinates: 41°10′39″N 48°07′41″E

- Xınalıq tarix-etnoqrafiya muzeyi
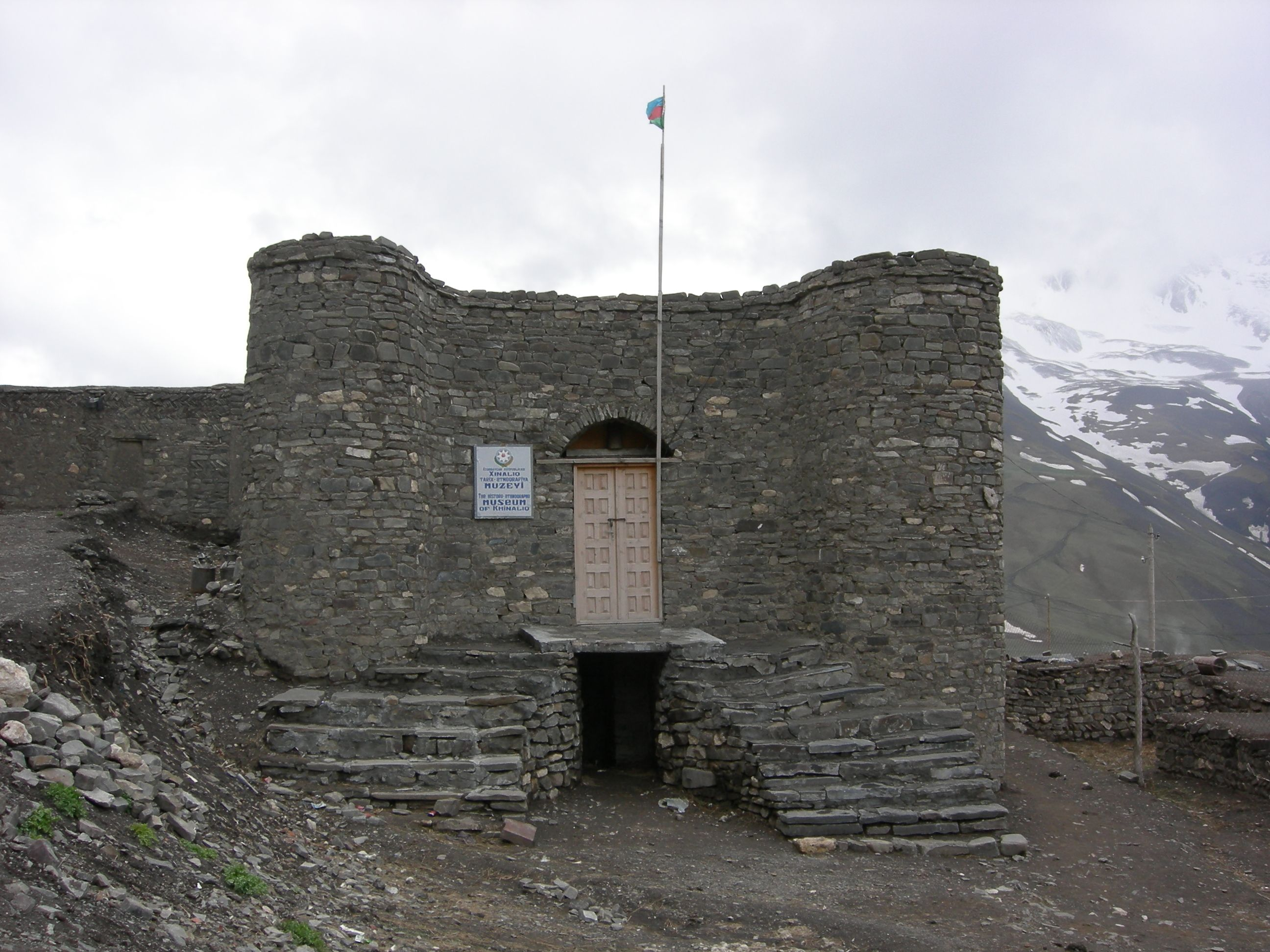
- Interactive map of Historical-ethnographic museum of Khinalug village
- Location: Quba Rayon, Azerbaijan
- Beginning date: 2001

The historical-ethnographic museum in Khinalug village (Azerbaijani: Xınalıq tarix-etnoqrafiya muzeyi) is a museum that was established in 2001 by residents of the Khinalug village. It is located in the Quba Rayon of Azerbaijan.

== History ==
The founder of the historical-ethnographic museum is a resident of Khinalug village, Khalil-Rahman Abdurrahman oglu Jabbarov. Rare historical exhibits, archaeological and ethnographical materials, and also carpets and kilims, various house utensils, pottery and ceramic dishes, stone books, etc., have been collected in the museum on his initiative and with help of residents of the village. The most interesting exhibit of the museum, attracting many tourists to the village, are manuscript books dated to the 15th–19th centuries and they evidence that the past of the village was closely related to science.

== Characteristics ==
The total area of the museum, consisting of two halls, is 160 square meters. A building, where the museum is located, is reminiscent of a historical castle. Works of Rahim Alkhas, the Azerbaijani poet, native of Khinalug village are exhibited at entrance of the museum.

== Khinalug village ==
The Khinalug village is 2,300–2,500 meters above the sea level. It is known for its language, distinctive customs, and traditions. As of 2008, about 1,500 people were living in Khinalug. Nearly the whole population is indigenous. Residents of Khinalug were fire worshippers until the Islamic belief. Fire is an object of a particular respect up to now. There is a source of natural gas in the western part of Khinalug, which is called Ateshgah.
