= Khinalug =

Khinalug Kətş
- Municipality
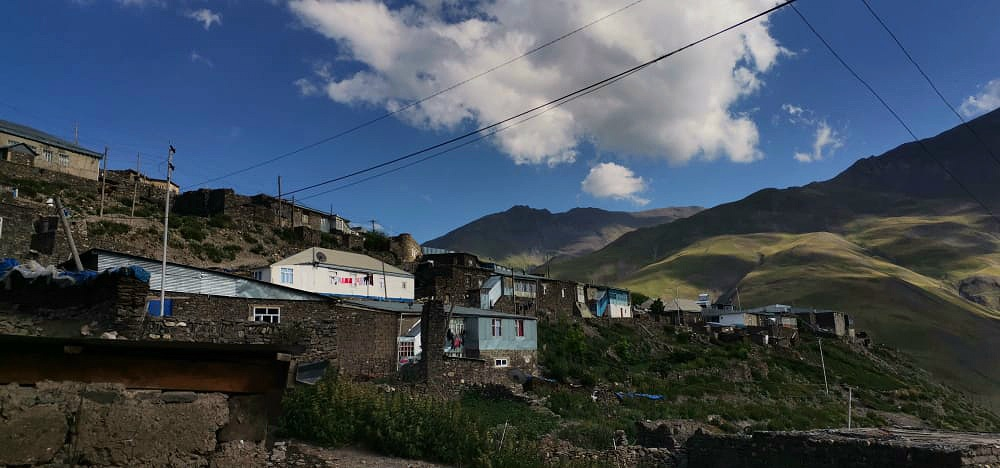
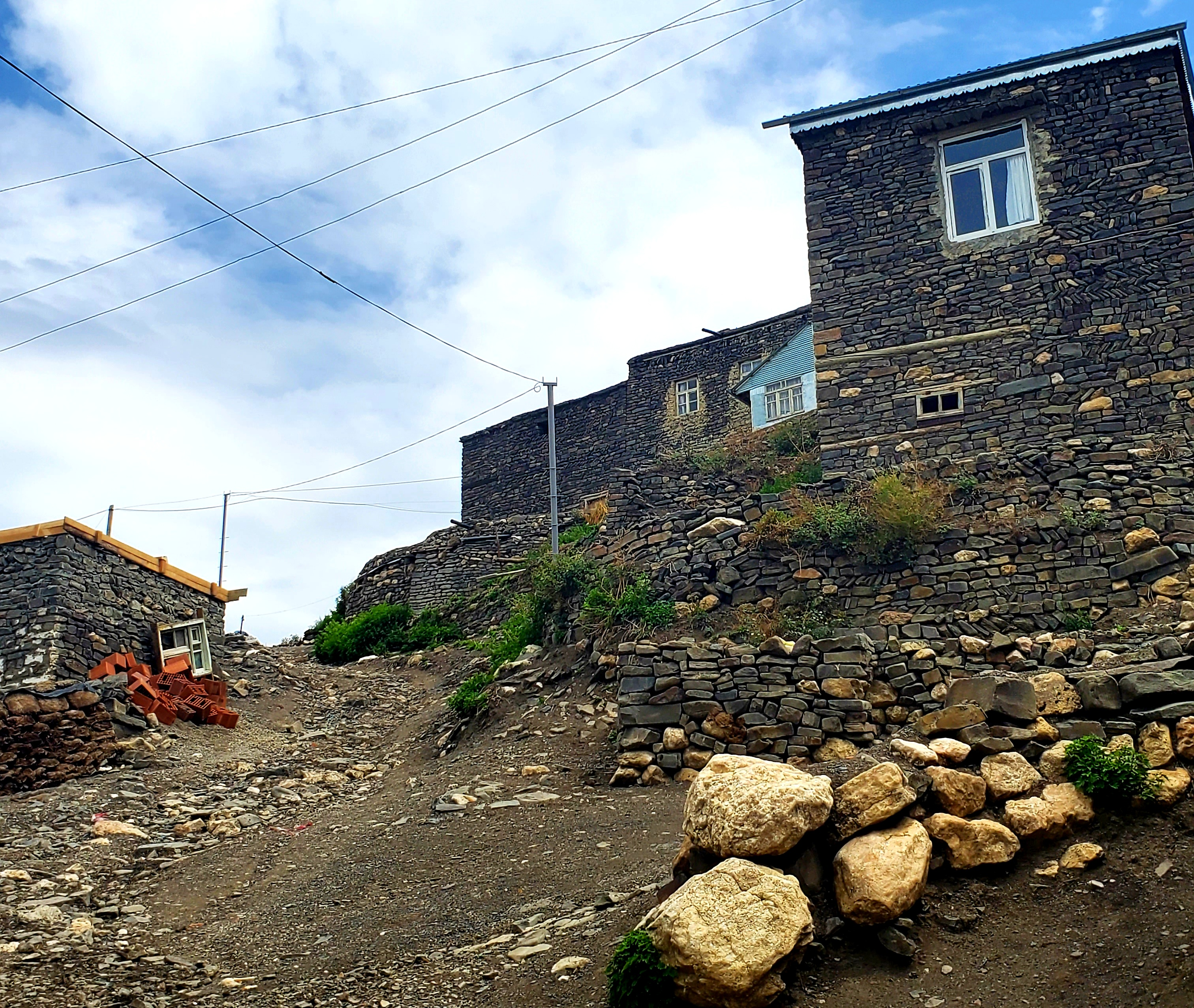
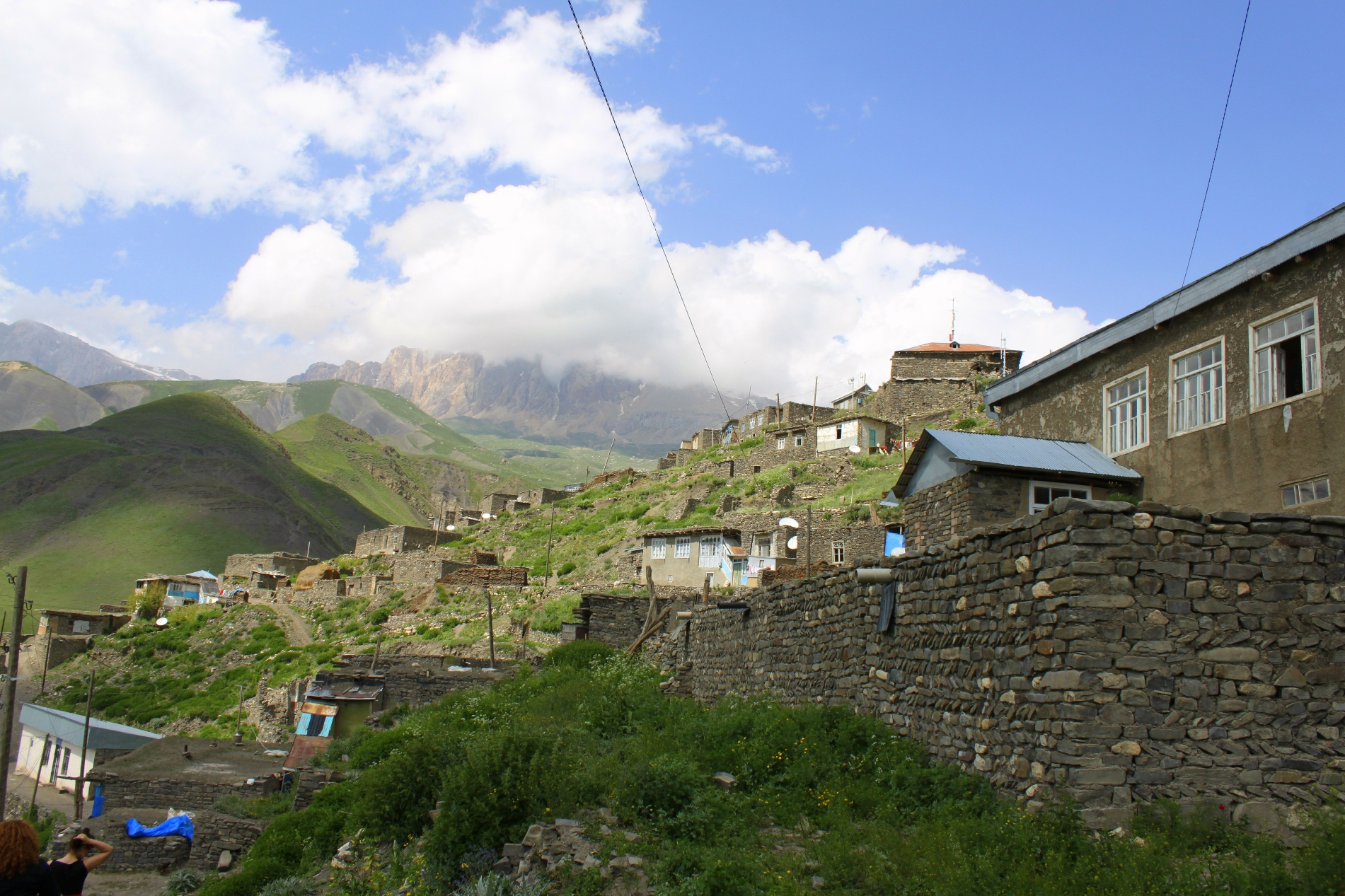
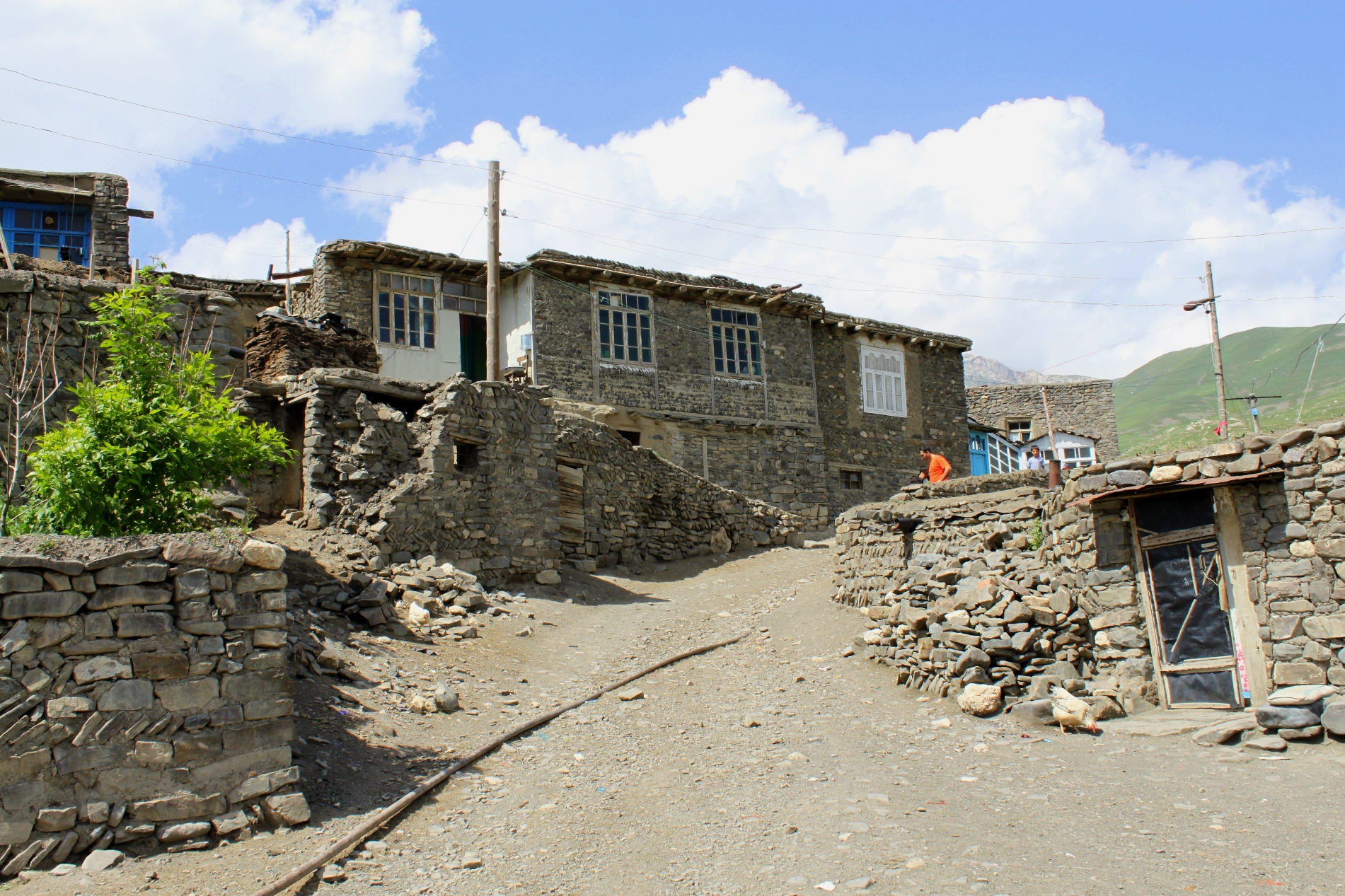
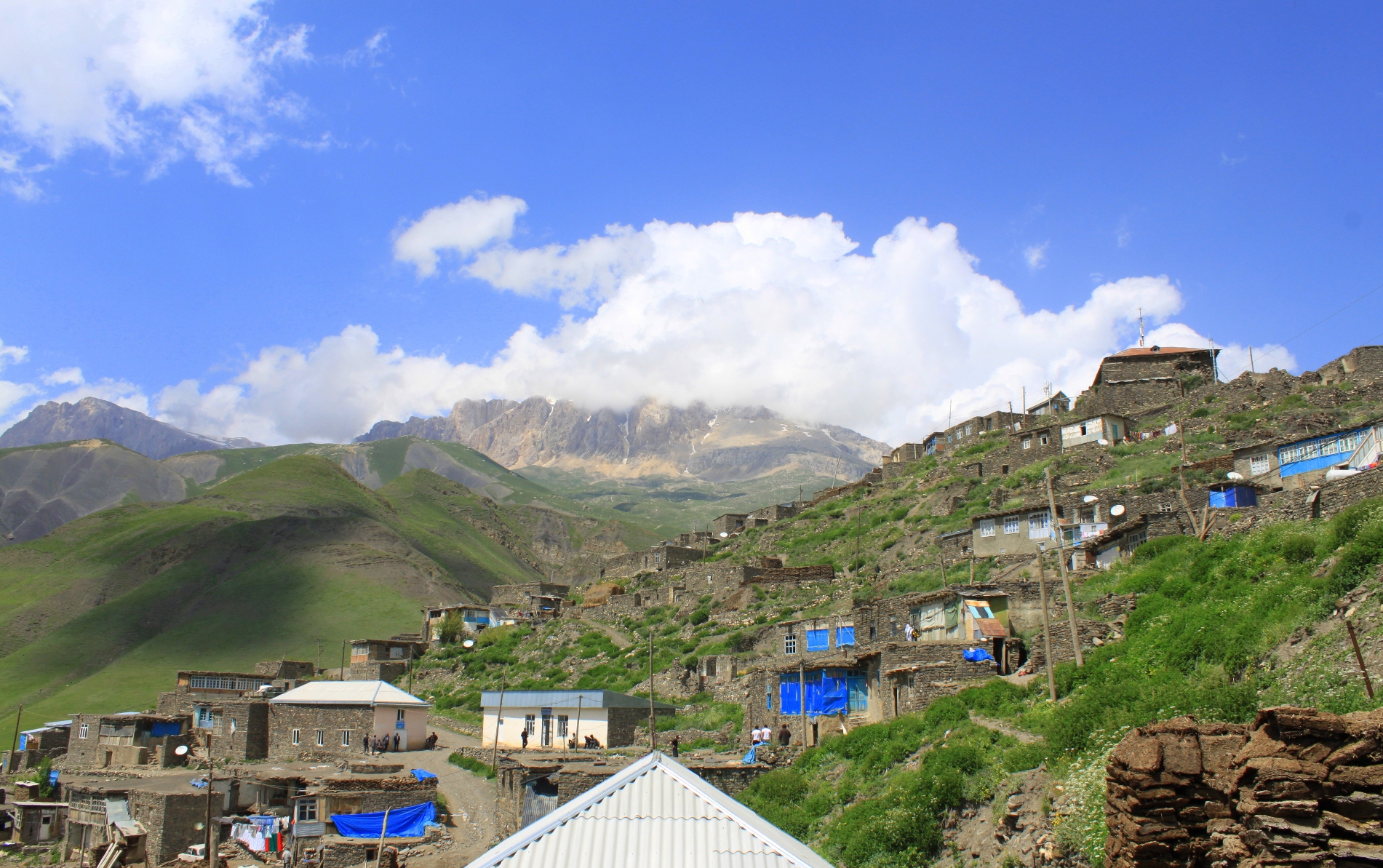
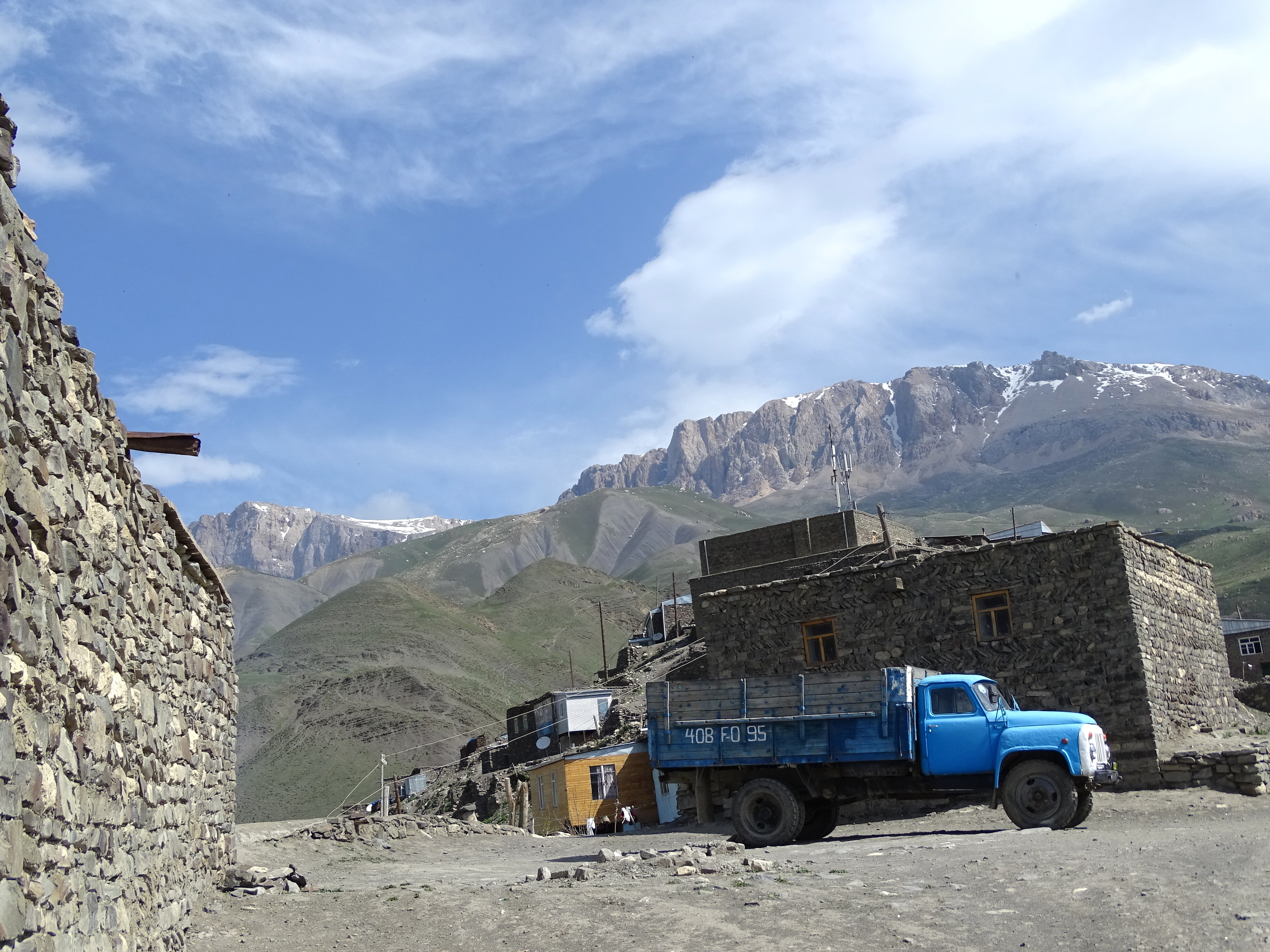
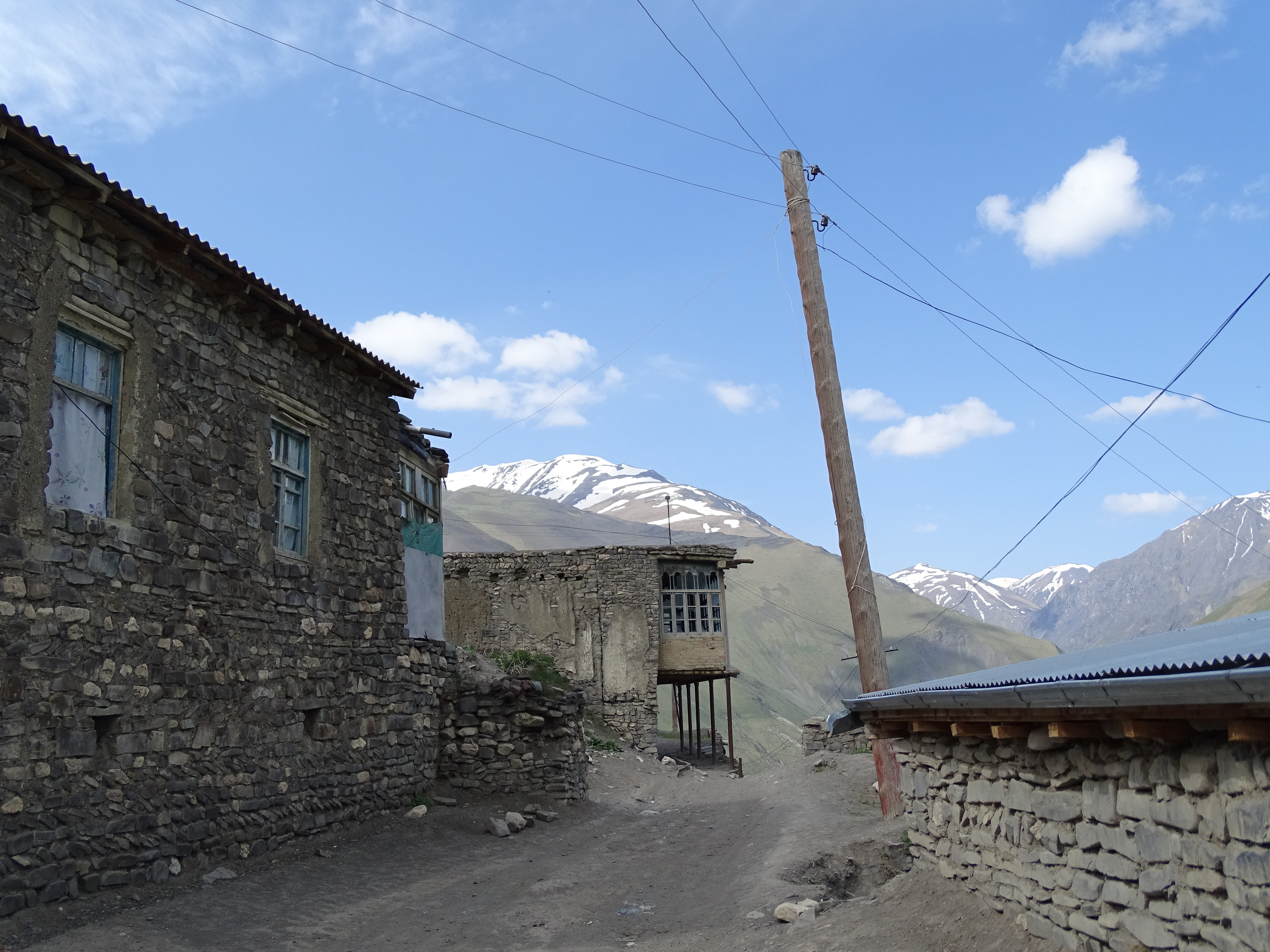
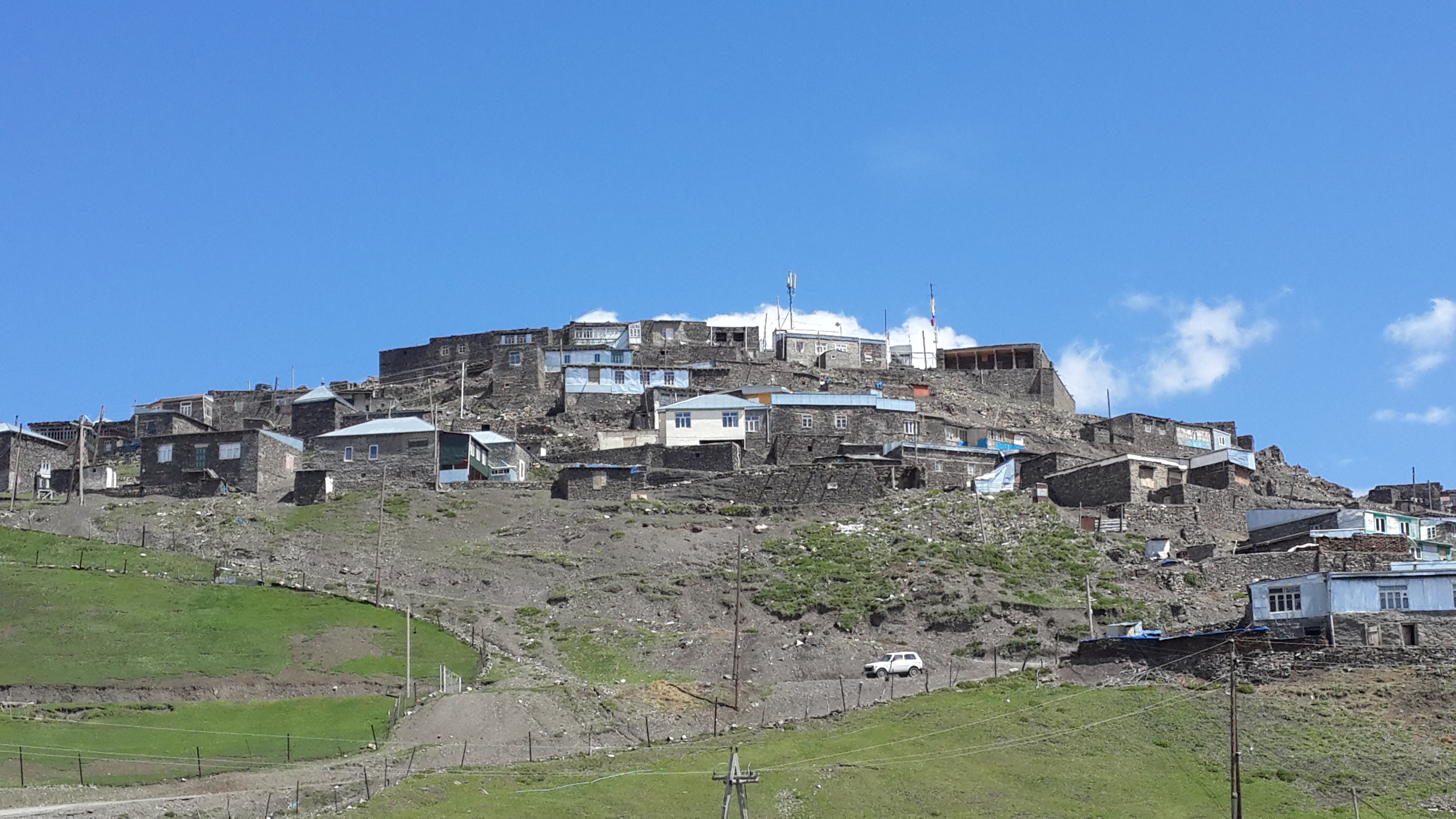

- Location within Azerbaijan
- Coordinates: 41°10′41″N 48°07′36″E
- Country: Azerbaijan
- District: Quba
- Elevation: 2,180 m (7,150 ft)

Population
  - Total: 2,075
- Time zone: UTC+4 (AZT)
  - Summer (DST): UTC+5 (AZT)

UNESCO World Heritage Site
- Official name: Cultural Landscape of Khinalig People and "Köç Yolu" Transhumance Route
- Type: Cultural
- Criteria: iii, v
- Designated: 2023 (45th session)
- Reference no.: 1696

Khinalug or Khinalyg (Azerbaijani: Xınalıq; Khinalug: Kətş) is a municipality and an ancient Caucasian village with origins dating back to the Caucasian Albanian period. It is located high up in the mountains of Quba District, Azerbaijan. The municipality of Khinalug is part of the Quba District and consists of the villages of Khinalug and Galaykhudat. The village was included in the Cultural Landscape of Khinalug People and "Köç Yolu" Transhumance Route UNESCO World Heritage Site in 2023.

== Location ==
Khinalug is located southwest of Quba on the Greater Caucasus mountain ridge, which separates the Northern Caucasus in Russia from the South Caucasus. It is the highest, most remote and isolated village in Azerbaijan, as well as one of the highest in the entire Caucasus region. The village experiences significant weather fluctuations between summer and winter, with temperatures ranging from −20 °C to 18 °C. Khinalug has a population of about 2,000 people. The residents speak Khinalug, a language that is an isolate within the Northeast Caucasian language family, although most also speak Azerbaijani.

== History ==
On 7 October 2006, the President of Azerbaijan, Ilham Aliyev, announced plans to modernize Khinalug's educational institutions, infrastructure, government buildings, and other local facilities.

In 2007, President Ilham Aliyev issued a decree establishing the Khinalug State Historical-Architectural and Ethnographic Reserve to protect the village's unique architecture, language, and cultural traditions.

In 2008, Khinalug was included on the World Monuments Fund's Watch List of the 100 Most Endangered Sites due to concerns over the construction of a road connecting Khinalug and Quba. The listing is not intended to discourage tourism or commercial development, but to highlight the importance of ensuring that any new projects do not compromise the village’s historical and cultural character.

In 2011, the Ministry of Culture and Tourism restored the roofs of nearly one hundred houses in Khinalug, and between 2012 and 2014, the village's 9th-century mosque was also restored. The village of Khinalug and the surrounding "Köç Yolu" Transhumance Route landscape were designated as a UNESCO World Heritage Site during the 45th session of the UNESCO World Heritage Committee.

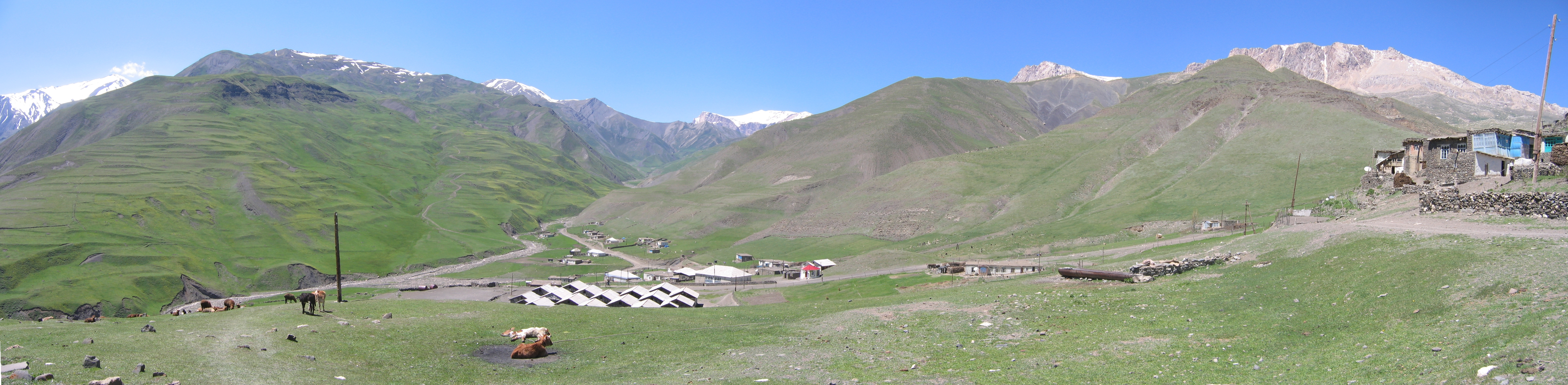
Panorama

Historian Bettany Hughes drew a connection between the women of Khinalug and ancient accounts of the Amazons, the legendary warrior women said to live at the edge of the known world.

== Architecture ==
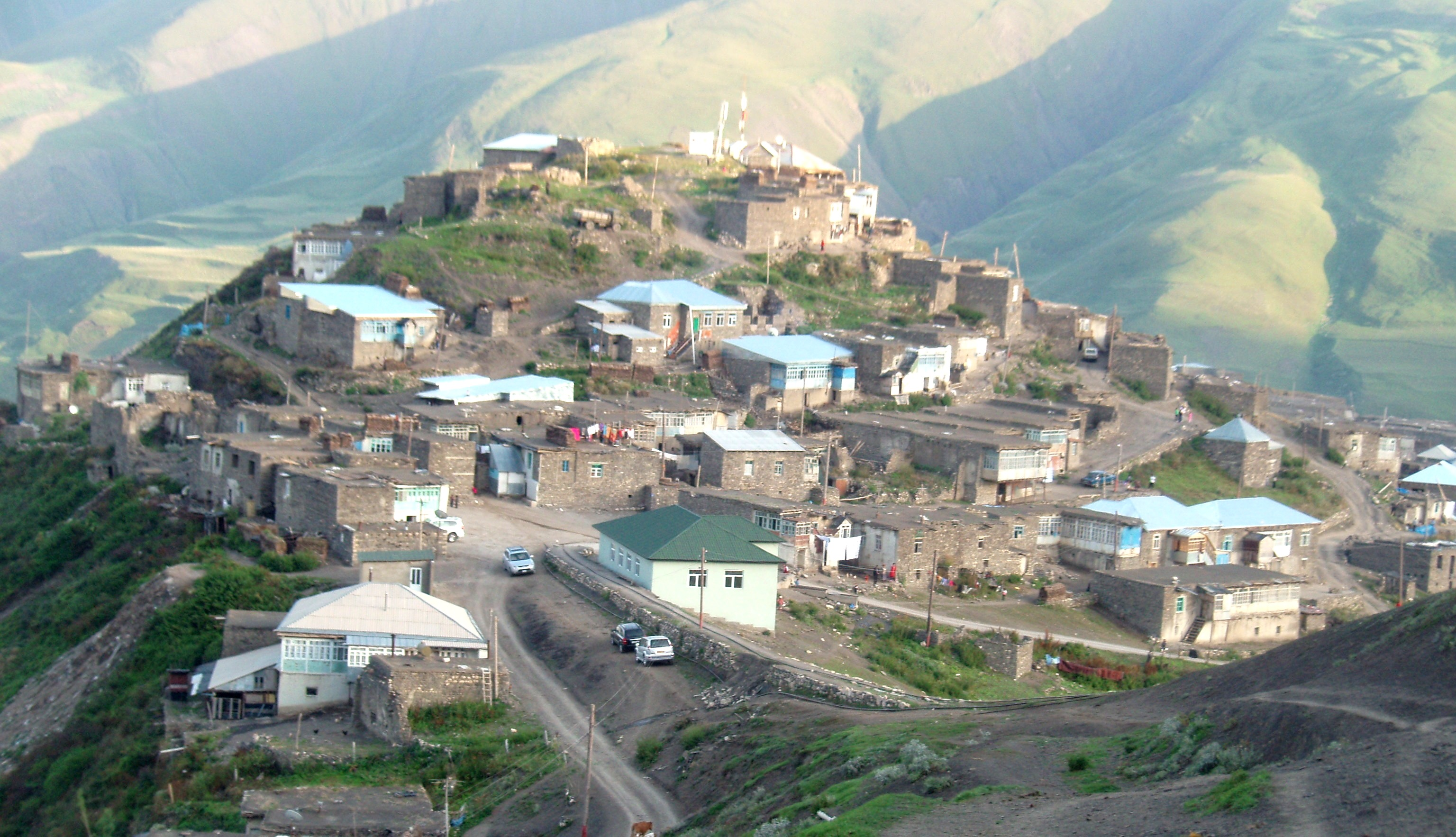
View in August 2009

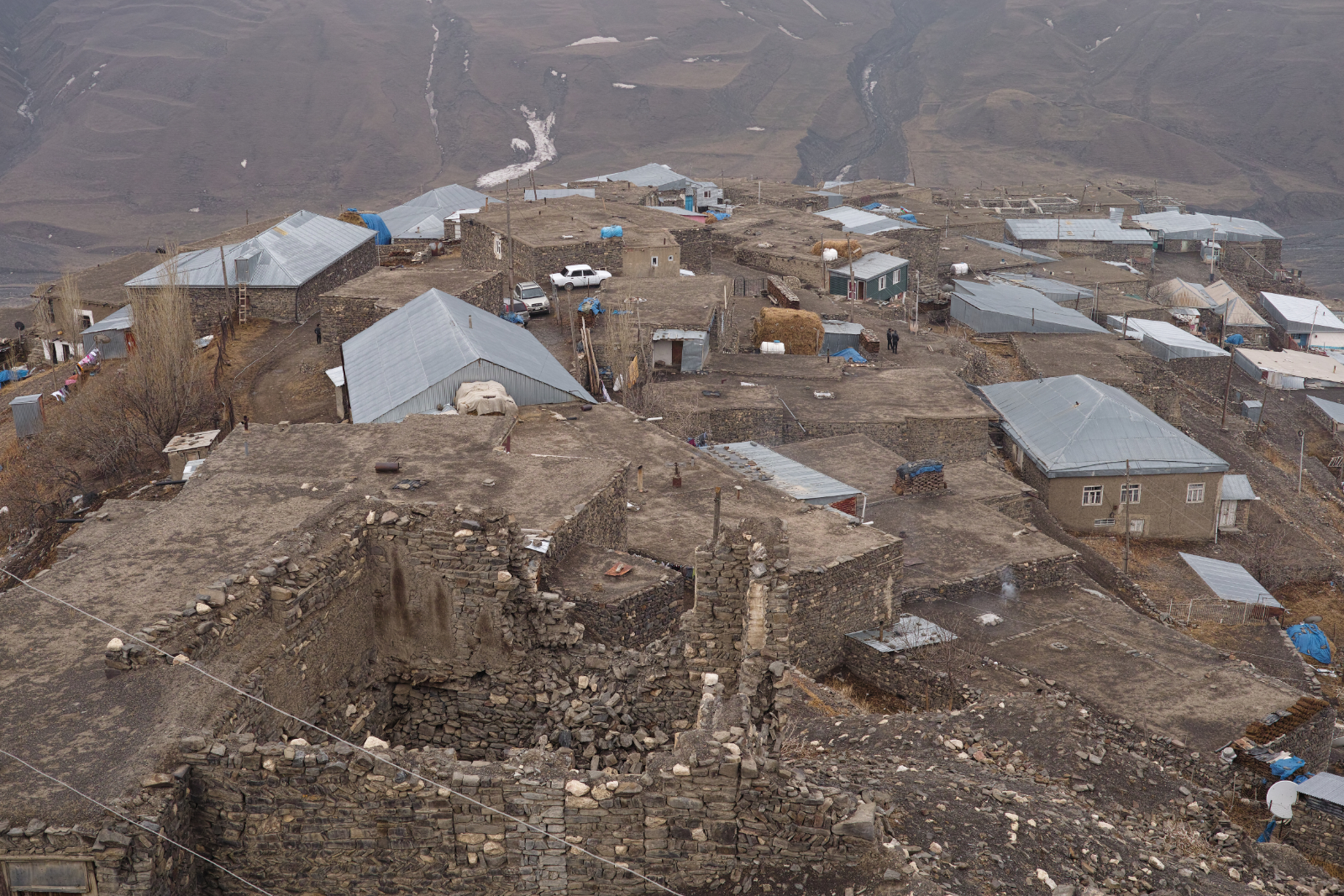
Xinaliq, Azerbaijan, March 2023

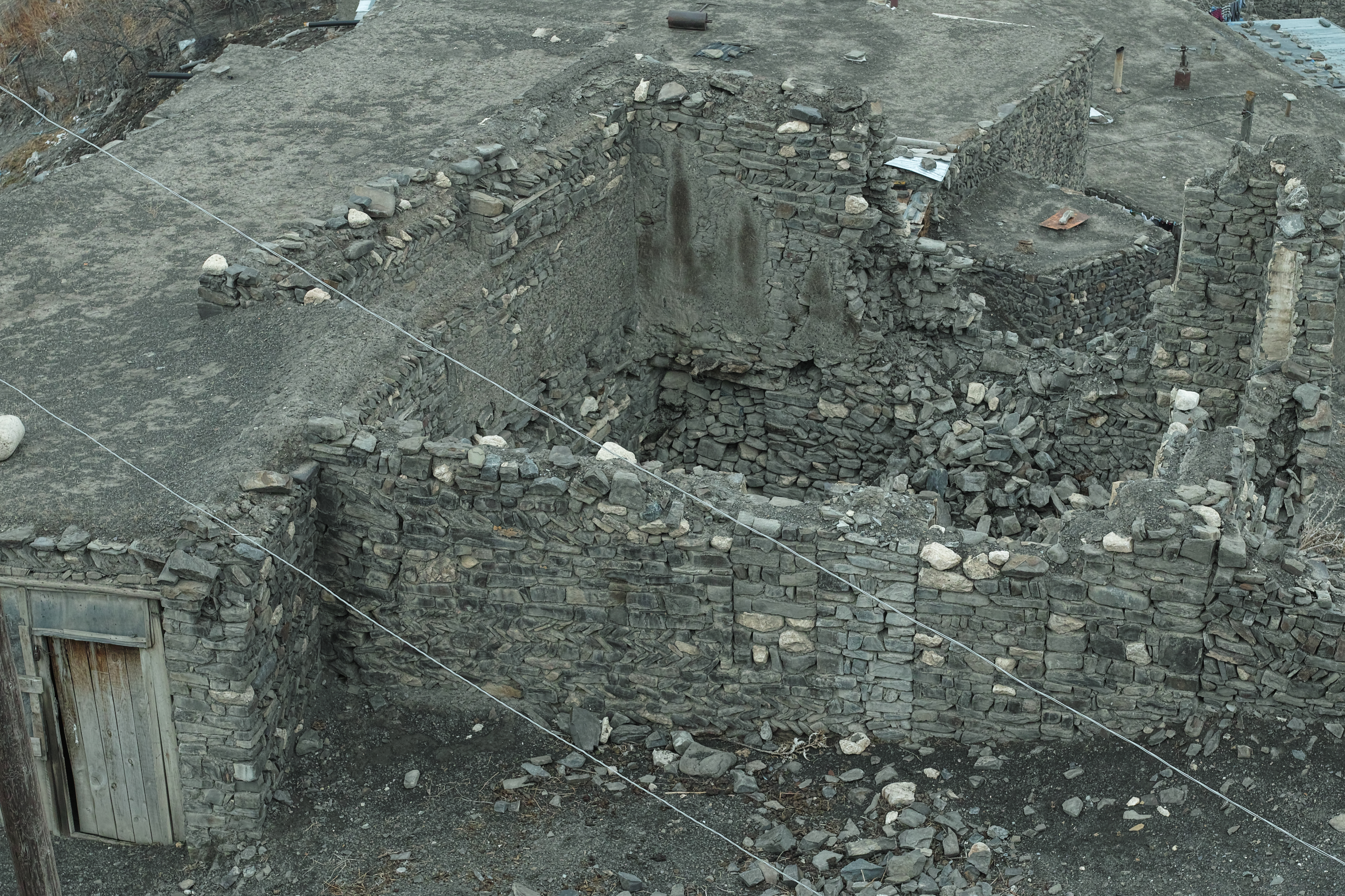
masonry detail, Xinaliq, Azerbaijan

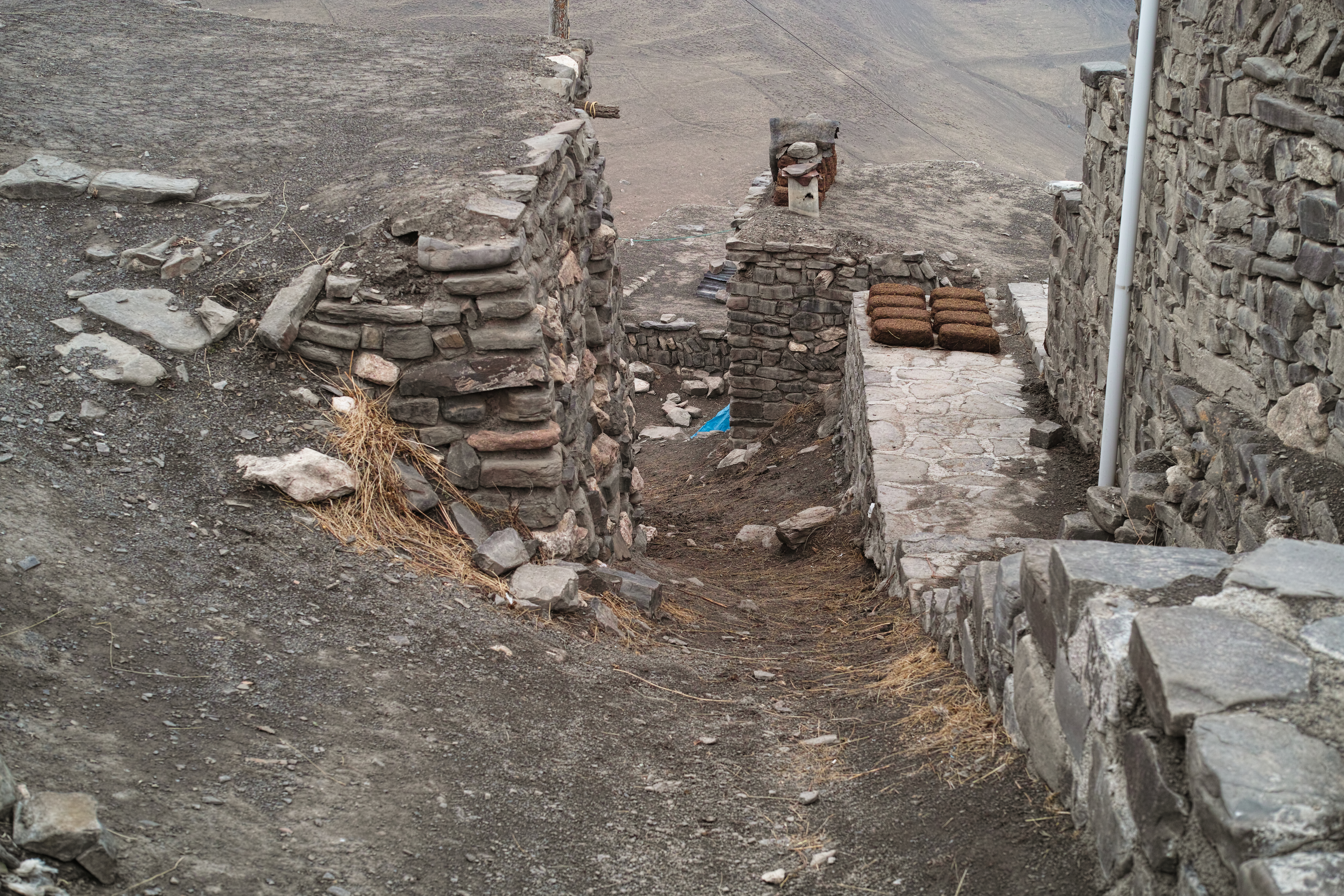
Xinaliq, Azerbaijan, March 2023

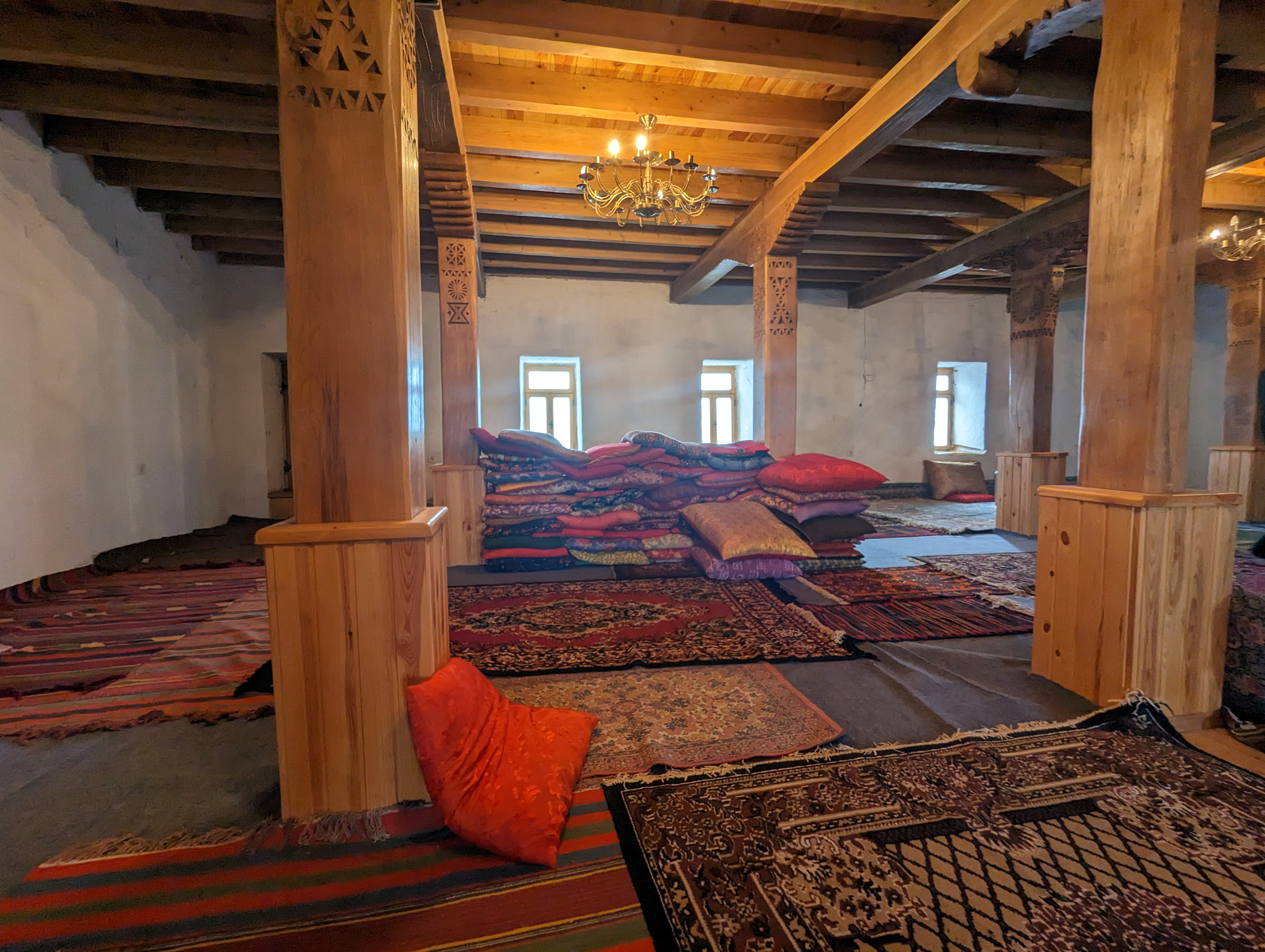
mosque interior, Xinaliq, Azerbaijan

The local houses are supported by columns positioned in the center of the room. The houses typically contain no furniture; instead, they are filled with pillows, blankets, and mutakkah (oblong-shaped cushions), as well as mattresses of various sizes. By custom, there are no tables, and inhabitants sit on the floor.

Khinalug village was included in the "List of World Significant Immovable Historical and Cultural Monuments" by Decision No. 132 of the Cabinet of Ministers of the Republic of Azerbaijan, dated August 2, 2001. In this list, the monument is recorded under inventory number 9.

Name	Category	Type	Significance	Date	Inventory Number
Khinalug village	Village	Architecture	World significance	17th-19th centuries	9
Tower	Tower	Architecture	National significance	1537	301
Abdullayev's residential house	Residential house	Architecture	Local significance	19th century	4614
Zoroastrian temple	Temple	Architecture	Local significance	19th century	4647
Mosque	Mosque	Architecture	Local significance	19th century	4648
Mosque	Mosque	Architecture	Local significance	19th century	4650
Mosque	Mosque	Architecture	Local significance	19th century	4651
Sheikh Shalbuz Mosque	Mosque	Architecture	Local significance	19th century	4649

== Culture and customs ==
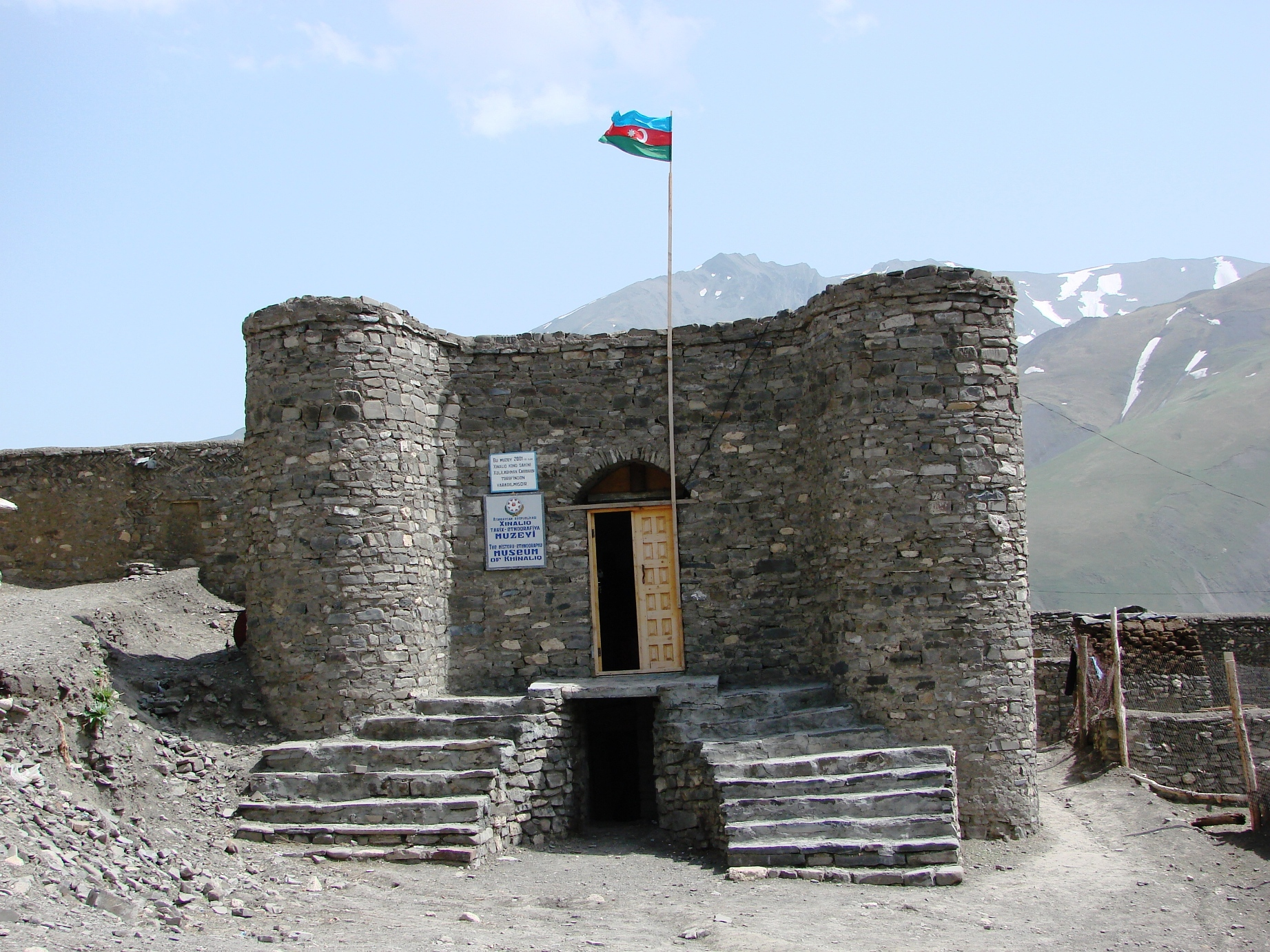
Khinalug museum

The lifestyle of the present-day Khinalug residents has remained largely unchanged since ancient times. The region is rich in traditions related to rain, agriculture, and a special reverence for domestic animals and celestial bodies. Weddings and other ceremonies in Khinalug are carried out in strict adherence to rites passed down through generations.

The villagers primarily engage in sheep breeding and weaving. The residents of Khinalug are known for producing the chukha, a woolen shawl, which in the past was a national costume worn by the wealthier people in the villages. Wool socks, resembling mini carpets in various colors, are commonly worn in Khinalug due to the harsh winters. Another key activity of the local people is collection of medicinal herbs. August in Khinalug marks the start of honey season, known for its unique taste and aroma.

In Khinalug, households use fuel made from manure, typically stored in piles of cubes or bricks known as tezek in Azerbaijani. This type of bio-fuel was once widely used throughout Azerbaijan. The manure is gathered, mixed with hay, shaped into specific forms, and then pressed. The resulting bricks are dried in the sun and arranged in stacks.

== Ethnic background ==
The Khinalug people, the primary and indigenous inhabitants of Khinalug, have lived in the Caucasus for thousands of years, maintaining their language, customs, and traditions throughout the ages. They are part of the Shahdag ethnic group and are considered native Azerbaijanis. Historically, the Khinalug people are descendants of the ancient populations of Caucasian Albania, which is now part of modern-day Azerbaijan.

They are thought to be among the 26 tribes of Caucasian Albania that the Greek geographer Strabo mentioned in his work Geography.

Eight ancient graveyards surround the village, spanning an area several times larger than the village itself. Most of the graves contain three or four layers of burials. The tombstones feature inscriptions in various alphabets. In the 10th century, to defend against nomadic tribes, Khinalug was fortified with special defense structures, including a fortress. The main watchtower housed the Zoroastrian temple. Local elders recount that the priest who lived in this temple was named "Pirjomard" and that he tended to an eternal flame that burned there.

Boys playing football on a pitch in Khinalug

== Language ==
The Khinalug people speak a distinct language that is considered a language isolate within the Northeast Caucasian language family. While it may share some affinities with the Lezgic languages, a definitive relationship has not been established. The earliest known description of the Khinalug language appears in the writings of Roderich von Erckert. In his 1895 German-language book Die Sprachen des kaukasischen Stammes, published in Vienna, Erckert provides an overview of the language’s grammar and phraseology. In the 20th century, a special branch of the Institute of Linguistics of the USSR was established in Khinalug village to study the Khinalug language. Linguists working there developed a complete alphabet for the language, using a Latin-based script consisting of seventy-two letters.

The people of Khinalug call their village Ketsh, themselves Kettid, and their language Ketshmits. The name Khinalug came into use during the 1950s and 1960s. The name is believed to originate either from the henna-colored rocks in the area or from the name of a Hun tribe.

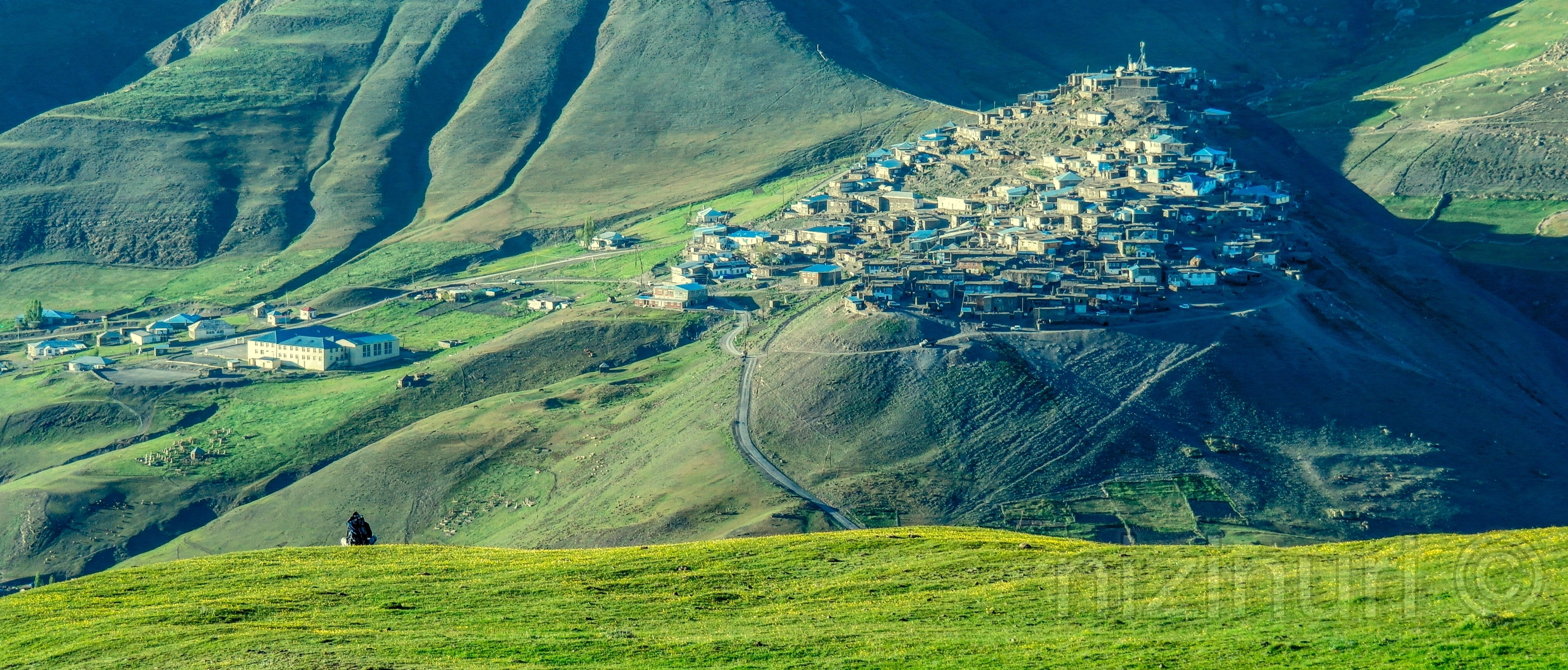
Khinalug village

== Religion ==
The population of the village practices Shafi'i Sunni Islam. The people of Khinalug are deeply religious, and before embracing Islam, they were followers of Zoroastrianism. Today, the village is home to nearly ten mosques. In the 12th century, Abu Muslim began preaching Islam in the region, and the Juma Mosque, named in his honor, was built during that time. Located on a hill in the center of the village, it is considered the forerunner of all other local mosques. Two rocks, each about two meters high, stand to the right of the mosque's entrance and bear runic inscriptions. Another mosque in the village, called Pirjomard, has a plaque on its wall indicating it was built in 1388 AD.

In the oldest part of the village, which contains Zoroastrian traces, stands the Burj sanctuary. Built in the 7th century, it is only visited during Muslim religious celebrations.

Khinalug is surrounded by caves, pirs ('a holy place' or a 'shrine' in Azerbaijani), temples and ateshgahs (Zoroastrian praying places' in Azerbaijani). Pirs can be seen everywhere. Each of them has a grave where a holy person - the yevliya - is interred. Almost every pir has a scene, depicted on its wall, of Ibrahim bringing his son Ismail for sacrifice. The most famous pir of this village is called Khydyr Nabi. This actually is 'a burning' mountain, situated at 2600 meters above sea level and five kilometers away from Khinalug. This mountainous territory is rich with natural gas deposits. According to the local inhabitants, there are more such places in the outskirts of Khinalug. Well polished rocks engulfed in flames, as well as pebbles scattered all over, create an impression of a fallen tower. Those who come here not to pray, but to have a picnic, like cooking kebabs right on these stones, and then, to sunbathe under the sun's rays, whilst looking at the beauty of the highlands. A horse ride from Khinalug to Ateshgah takes thirty minutes, whereas on foot it can take up to two or three hours. The legend about Ateshgah relates that a shepherd, who came here on a freezing day with his flock, had collected a lot of wood with which to make a bonfire. However, as he made it, the entire area was suddenly ablaze: the terrified shepherd kissed the stones and started to pray to the Almighty. Since that time, the flame has never gone out, and the place is considered as holy, and subsequently became a Temple. Indeed, it may be understood from these places why Azerbaijan is known as "the Land of Fire". Both water and earth burn with fire throughout the region.

To explore the history of Khinalug and its ancient artifacts, visitors can tour the Historical-ethnographic museum of Khinalug village, established in 2001. The museum, covering a total area of 160 m^{2}, features two sections showcasing traditional earthenware, clothing, carpets, household tools, coins, weapons, and photographs of notable figures from the village.

Name	Area (m²)	Capacity (people)	Built by	Construction Date
Ali Muslim or Pir Jomard Mosque	192	192	Built by Arabs	Year 980 or 12th century
Abu Muslim Mosque	340	340	Arab commander Abu Muslim	11th century
Sheikh Shalbuz Mosque	72	72	Sheikh Shalbuz	16th century
Sheikh Israfil Baba Mosque	72	72	Built by local people	16th century
Khidr Nabi Mosque	96	96	Built by local people	15th century
Mohuj Baba Mosque	32	32	Built by local people	15th century
Neighborhood Mosque	72	72	Built by local people	18th century

== Atashgah fire temple ==
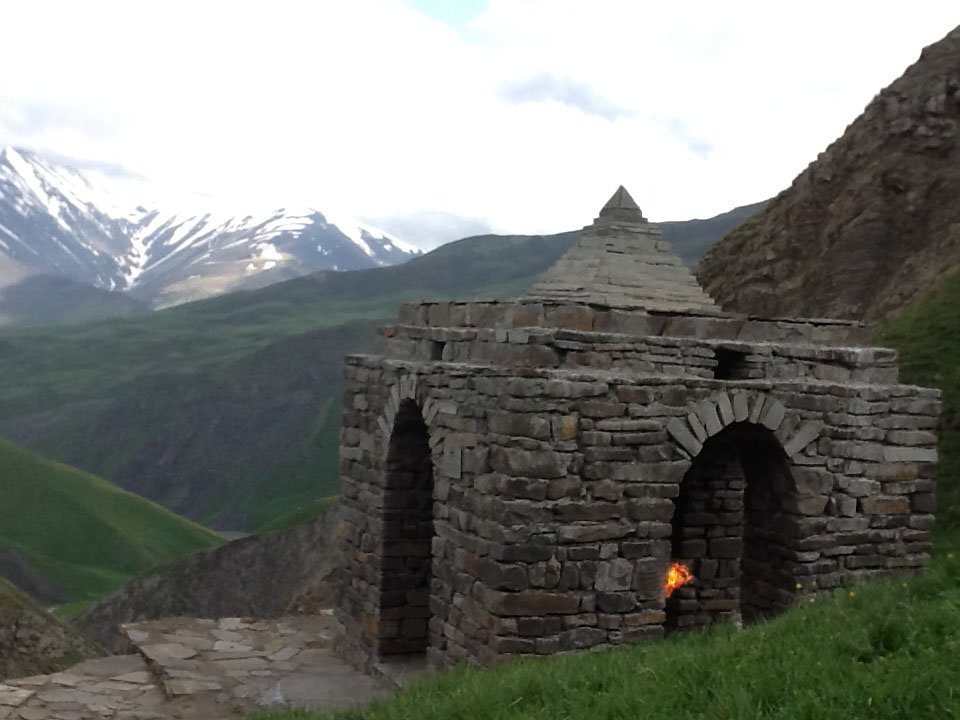
Restored atash-kadeh of Khinalug

Atashgah (atash-kadeh) is a Zoroastrian fire temple with a natural eternal flame, located approximately 5 kilometers from the village, at an altitude of about 3,000 meters above sea level. It sits on a spur of Mount Shahdag, at the foot of the Gizil-Gaya rock. The temple was restored in 2016 on the site of ancient ruins, through the joint efforts of the World Zoroastrian Organization and the Ministry of Culture and Tourism of Azerbaijan. It is included in the List of State-Protected Historical and Cultural Monuments of the Republic of Azerbaijan under ID No. 4647.

== Snowman tale ==
In 1988, a Khinalug hunter named Babaali Babaaliyev claimed to have encountered a large, hairy, human-like creature, often referred to as a snowman, while resting in a cave. The creature silently blocked the entrance and stared at him, leaving the hunter paralyzed with fear. The creature eventually left without incident, but Babaali was so shaken by the experience that he never returned to the place of the encounter.

== Ecological situation ==
Drinking water supply

The Khinalug area is rich in streams and springs. However, there are no usable springs or wells in the area where the settlement is located. As a result, girls and brides are always compelled to carry water in jugs and pitchers on their shoulders.

The necessity of fetching water from the Gudyalchay River, which flows far from the settlement in the bottom of the valley, poses significant challenges in their daily lives. Depending on the weather conditions, ordinary carelessness can lead to unfortunate incidents. Therefore, the water supply in Khinalug is not only a matter of convenience but is also vital for survival and the continuity of life.

Qırx Abdal shrine

Due to this issue, in ancient times, the water sources located to the north of the settlement, in the heart of the Qızıl Qaya mountain, were tapped to create a strong water flow. Water was transported to the settlement using clay pipes. However, the exact date and details of how the sacred Qırx Abdal spring water was brought to the village remain unknown.

Alxas spring

One of the mysterious springs in Khinalug is the Alxas Spring. The water comes from two sources: it seeps through the rocks and also gushes from underground. Drinking this water causes a tingling sensation in the teeth. Another peculiarity of this spring is that it only flows in the summer when shepherds settle in the high pastures.

Existing water supply systems

Currently, the drinking water supply for the village is provided by two sources. The first water pipeline was built in 1956 using ceramic pipes from the "Xəncər Bulaq" spring, located 2 km from the village. This pipeline remains in use today with ongoing maintenance. In 2007, following a directive from the President of Azerbaijan, a new water pipeline was constructed using iron pipes from the "Südlü Bulaq" spring, located 5 km away. While this new pipeline fully meets the water demand of the population, the iron pipes freeze during winter, requiring the municipality to shut down the system to prevent damage. As a result, residents rely solely on the older ceramic pipeline during winter. Throughout the village, 12 public fountains have been installed along the water pipeline, from which residents collect water in containers. In the newer residential area of the village, some inhabitants use an alternative water supply from a spring located 2 km away. However, according to villagers, this water (referred to as "black water") is of lower quality.

Sewage system

There is no sewage system in the village. Wastewater from rain, snow, and household use is discharged through open channels into the Khinalug (Dəyirman) River and the Qudyalchay River without any biological or chemical treatment.

Sanitary conditions

Since village houses are built from river stone using excavation techniques, one, two, or sometimes three walls of these homes remain damp. This moisture is caused by rainwater and the lack of proper drainage systems.

Land degradation

The subalpine meadows surrounding the village have suffered from overgrazing, leading to soil erosion and landslides. According to regulations, each hectare of summer pasture should support no more than four small livestock animals. However, the number of sheep grazing in the pastures around Khinalug exceeds this limit by 2 to 2.5 times. As a result, soil degradation has become a serious issue. Although livestock farming is the primary occupation of the village's population, the municipal summer pastures in Khinalug are insufficient. Additional pastures from state land reserves have been leased to farmers from other regions of the country.

== Social life ==
=== Education ===
According to the village elders, books were brought to this area in sacks from cities such as Istanbul and Izmir during the Ottoman period. It is said that the young men of the village received education in Istanbul, Tabriz, and Samarkand. There are graves of people from Khinalug in Samarkand. In the 19th century, 90% of the population of Khinalug was literate. However, this percentage significantly declined over time, and only in the 1960s did the first person from Khinalug receive higher education.

Currently, 312 students study at the R. Kalbiyev Khinalug Village Secondary School, which was established in 1926. Based on the proposal of the Executive Committee of Quba District, the Cabinet of Ministers of the Republic of Azerbaijan issued Decision No. 039 on March 2, 1995, naming the school after Rufat Ibrahim oglu Kalbiyev. Notably, Rufat Kalbiyev, born in 1973, was martyred in the war for Karabakh.

In grades I–IV, a subject called "Mother Tongue" is taught in the Ketish language. In connection with this, the Ministry of Education of the Republic of Azerbaijan approved the "Khinalug Language Curriculum" with Order No. 266 dated June 29, 1995. This program, compiled by poet-translator Rahim Alkhas, who was then a senior literature teacher at the Khinalug village school, was approved by the scientific council of the Azerbaijani Scientific Research Institute of Pedagogical Sciences and recommended for use. However, there is no literature or textbooks available to meet this demand.

Over the past five years (2005–2010), only one person from Khinalug has been admitted to a higher education institution (in 2010), which indicates a low level of education.

== Nature ==
Located in the Quba district at an altitude of 2,180 meters and facing the Qibla direction, Khinalug village shares borders with the Gabala district to the west and the Gusar district to the north. It is surrounded by the mountains of Gizil Gaya (3,725 m), Shahdag (4,243 m), Tufandag (4,191 m), and Khinalug (3,730 m).

Seven kilometers from Khinalug, at the foothills of Tufandag, lie three different lakes at an altitude of 3,500 meters. These lakes are formed by spring water and melting snow. However, an invisible connection between them keeps their water levels the same, functioning like interconnected vessels. According to legend, pieces of wood used to float in the largest of these lakes in the past. Some say these were remnants of Noah's Ark, and whenever someone tried to catch them, they would drift toward an uninhabited area. However, during an expedition conducted in Tufandag in 2007, no such wooden fragments were observed. Given the scarcity of plant life in the region, the presence of such wood remains a mystery.

To the west of Khinalug, 5–15 km away, small groves of birch trees grow on the slopes of the mountains near the banks of the Qudyalchay River. The mountains surrounding Khinalug are home to a variety of alpine meadow plants, including many medicinal herbs. At the foot of Khinalug village, the Qudyalchay and Khinalugchay (locally known as "Dəyirmançay" due to the presence of seven mills in the past) rivers flow.

There are numerous springs and caves in the vicinity of the village. A road passable for high-clearance vehicles extends 14 km from the village to the Shah Plateau, where the Ministry of Ecology and Natural Resources has established a Complex Hydrometeorological and Ecological Research Science Center.

== Addition to UNESCO World Heritage List ==
Cultural Landscape of Khinalug People and "Köç Yolu" Transhumance Route were added to the UNESCO World Heritage sites list in September 2023.

This cultural landscape is comprised of the high-mountain Khinalig village in northern Azerbaijan, high-altitude summer pastures and agricultural terraces in the Greater Caucasus Mountains, winter pastures in the lowland plains in central Azerbaijan, and the connecting 200-kilometre-long seasonal transhumance route called Köç Yolu ("Migration Route"). The village of Khinalig is home to the semi-nomadic Khinalig people, whose culture and lifestyle are defined by the seasonal migration between summer and winter pastures, and who retain the ancient way of long-distance vertical transhumance. The organically evolved network including ancient routes, temporary pastures and camping sites, mausoleums, and mosques illustrates a sustainable eco-social system adapted to extreme environmental conditions

— UNESCO World Heritage Convention

== Gallery ==
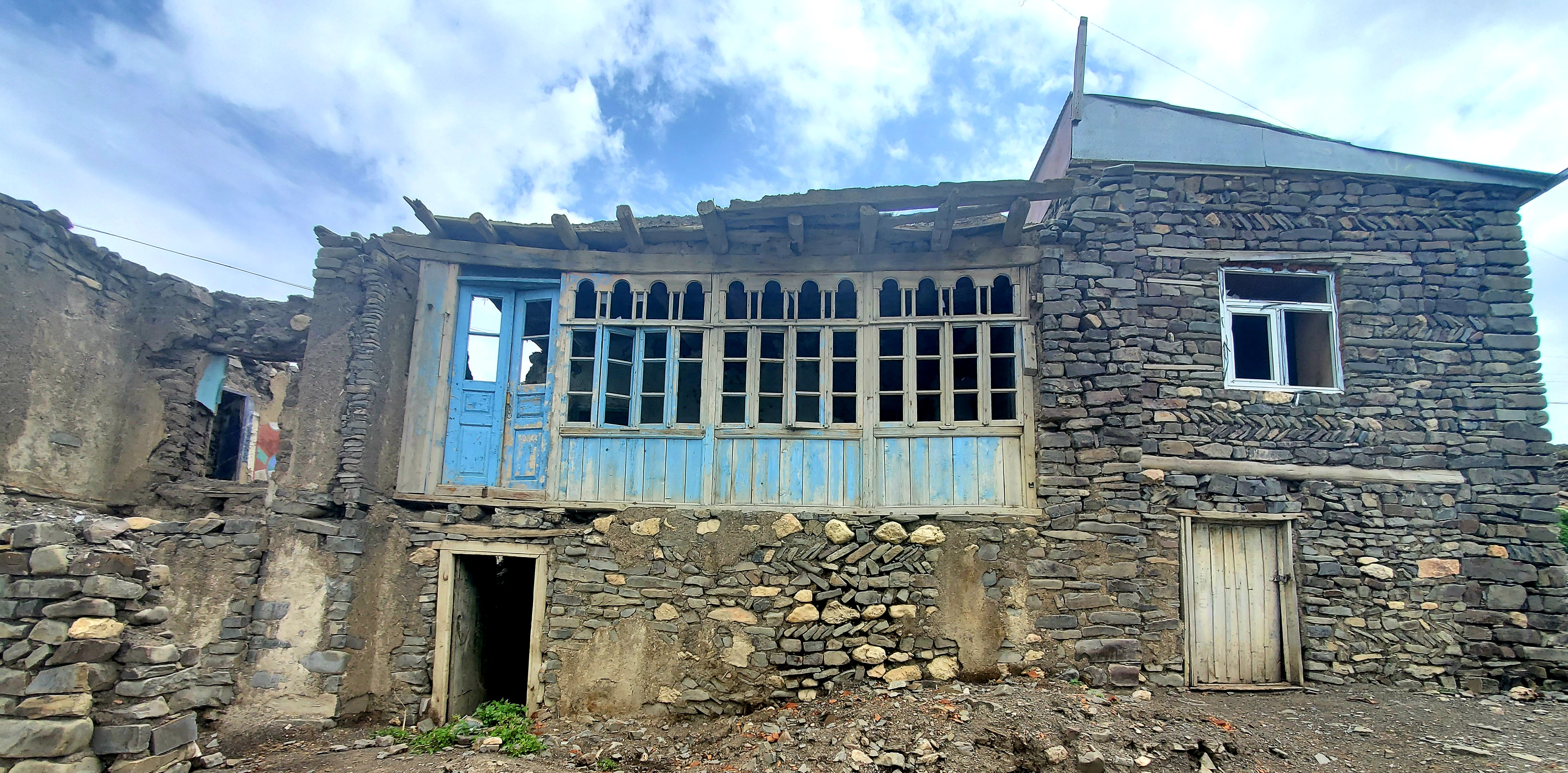

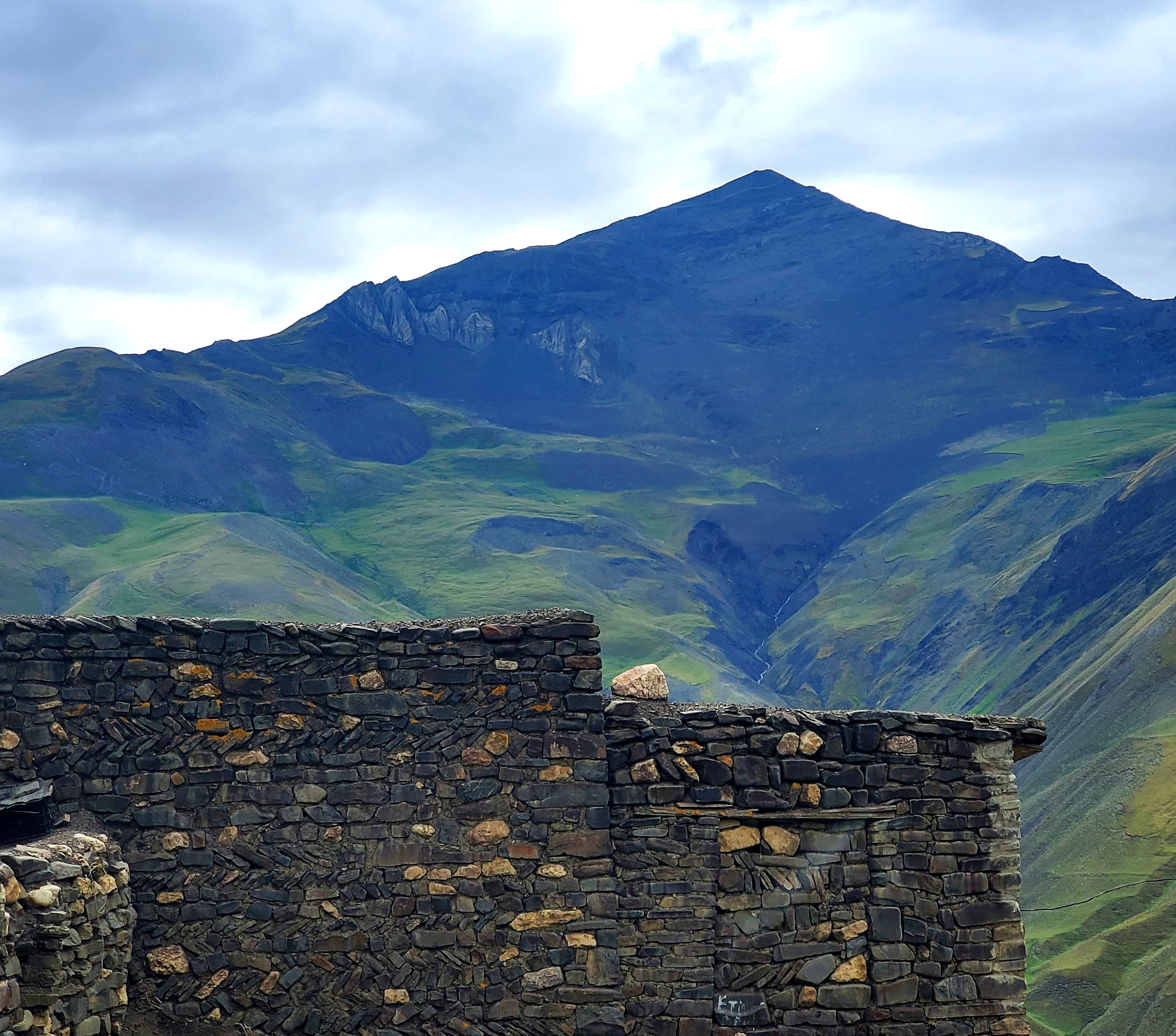

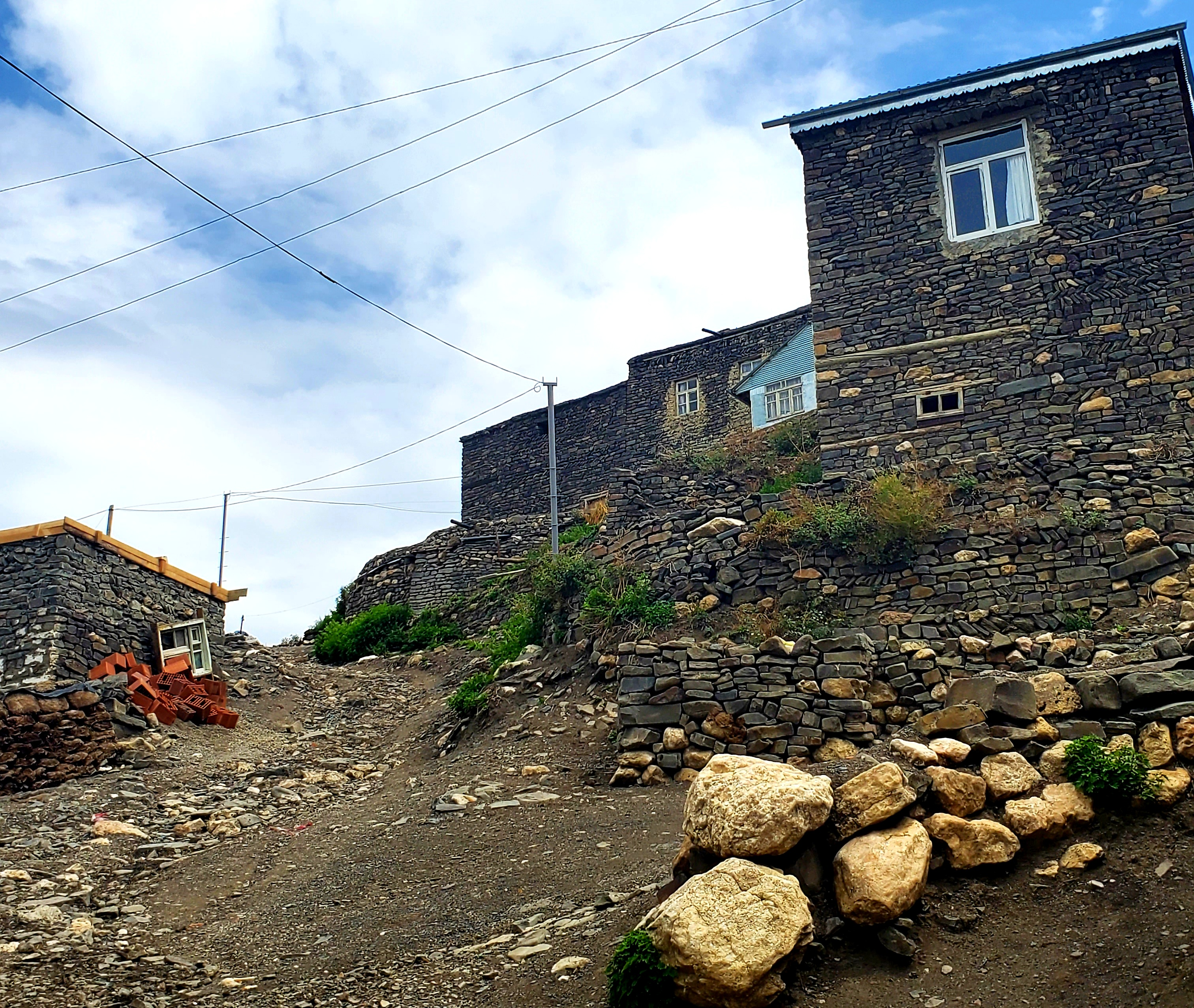

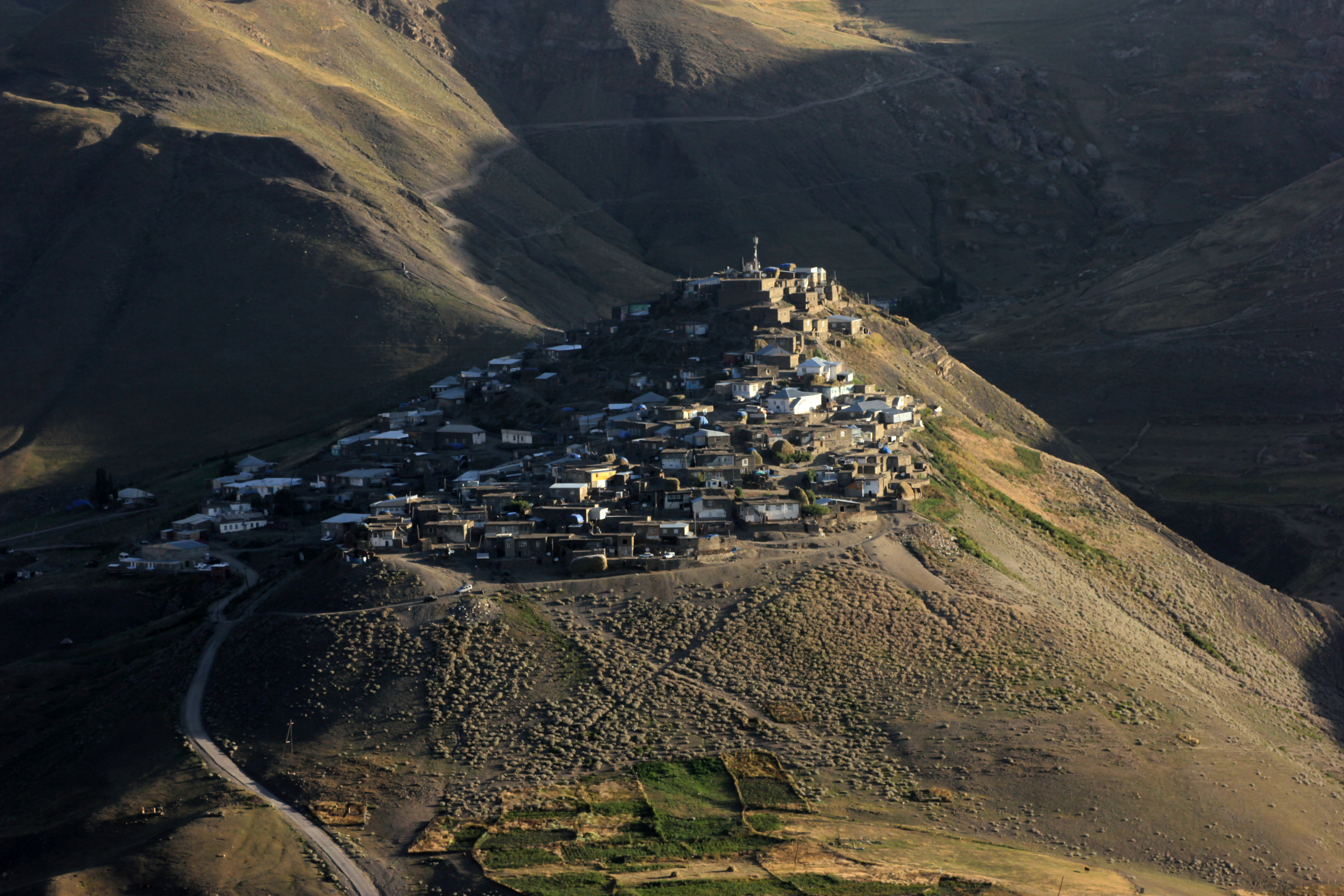

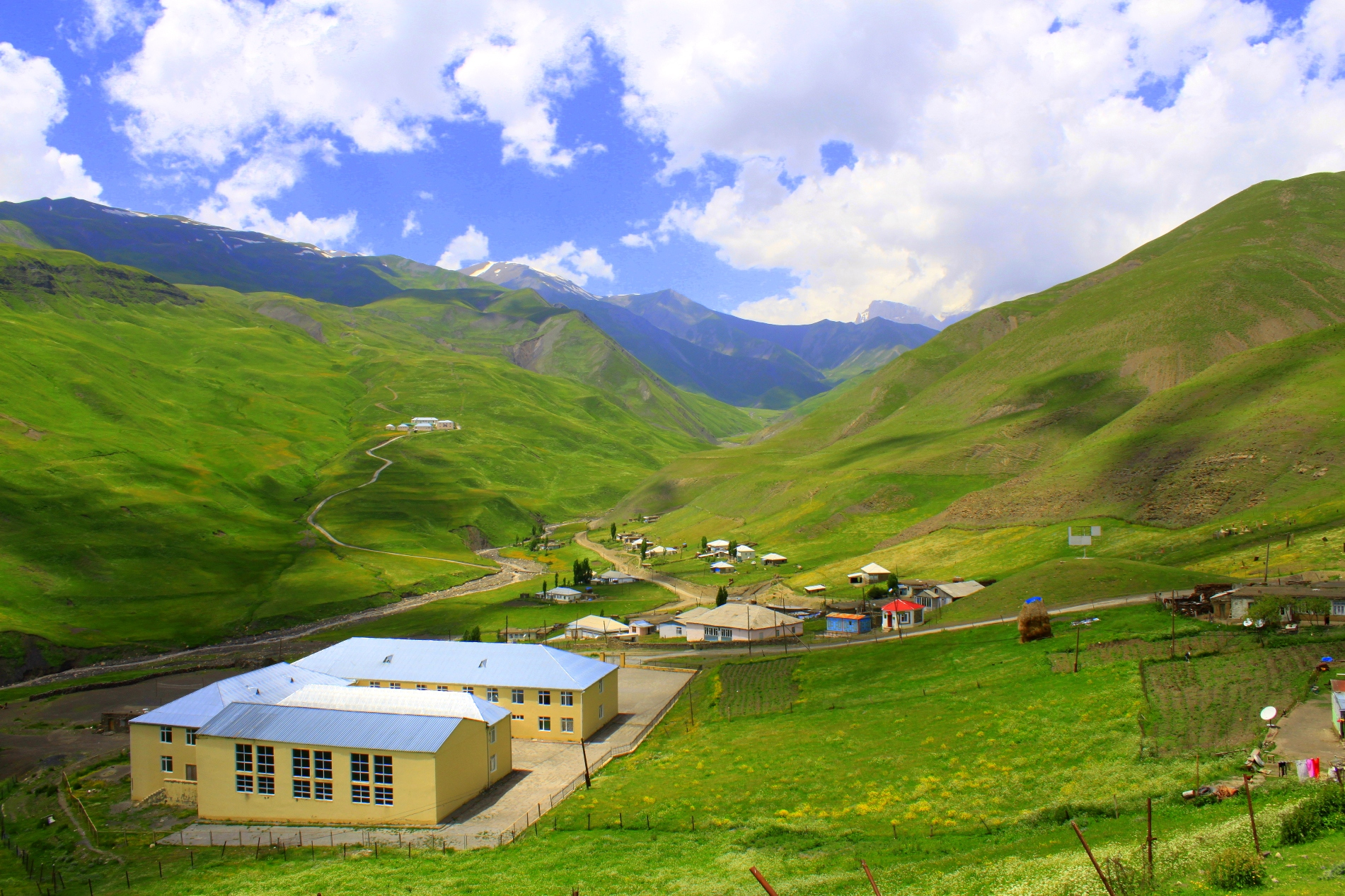

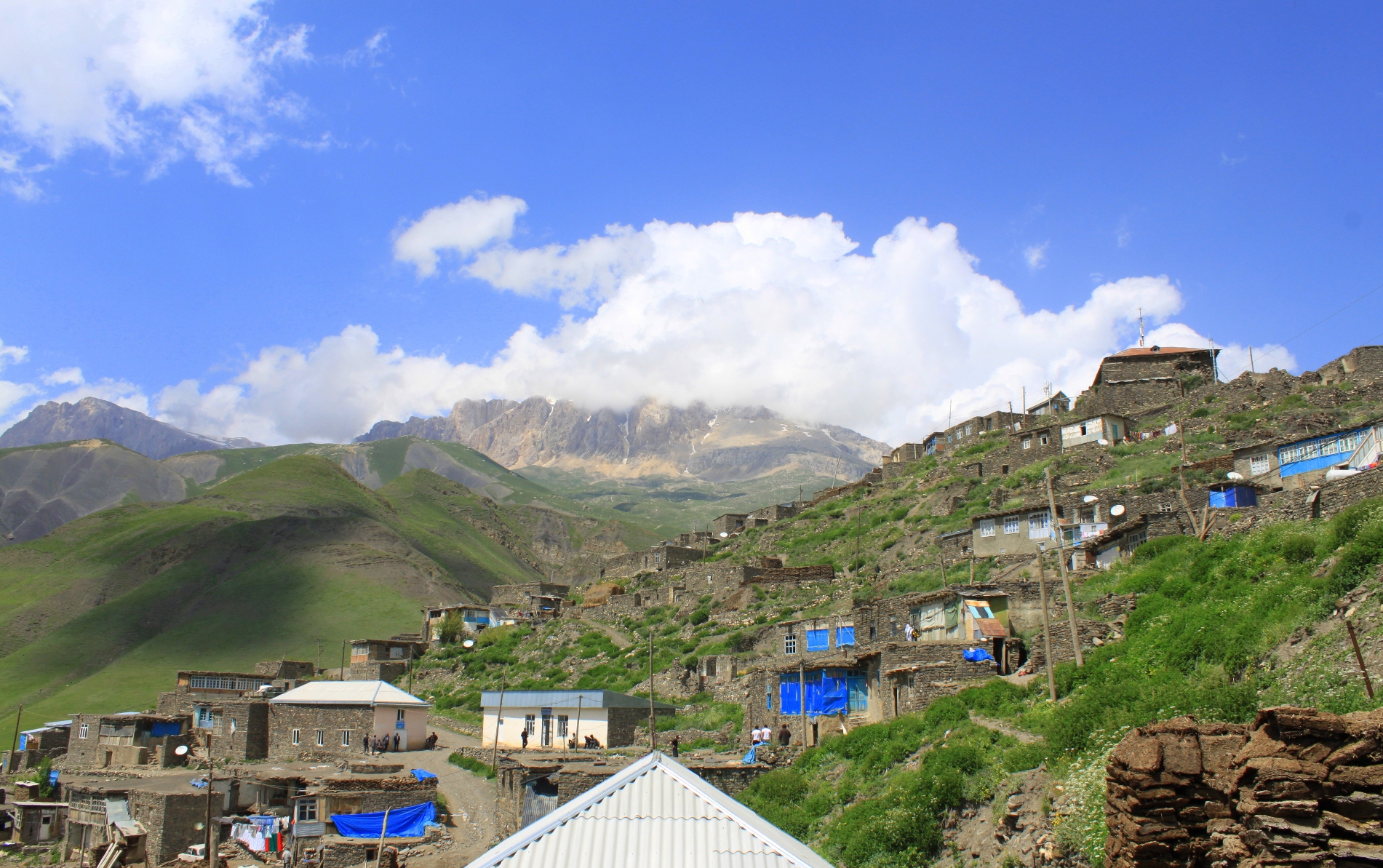

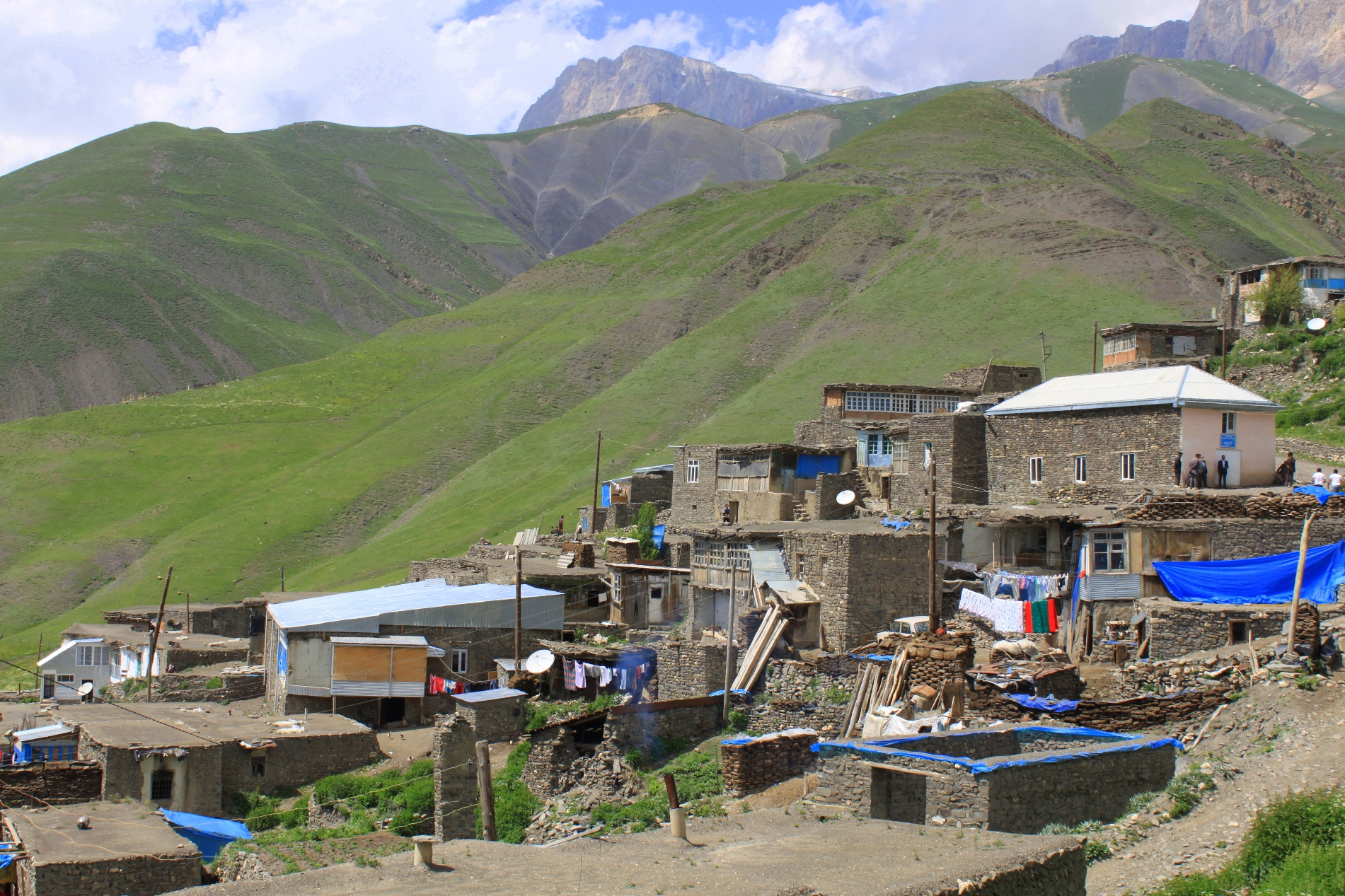

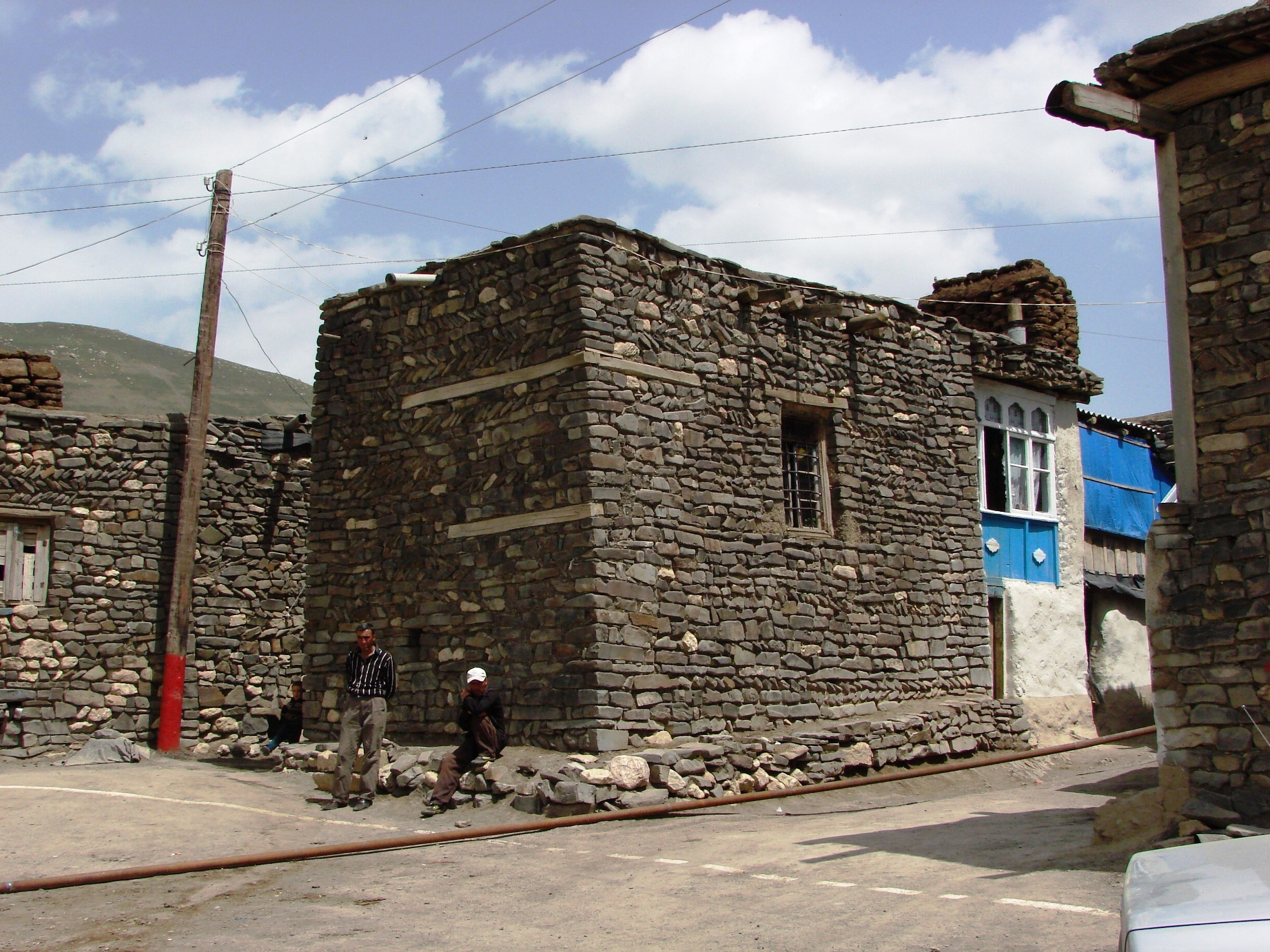

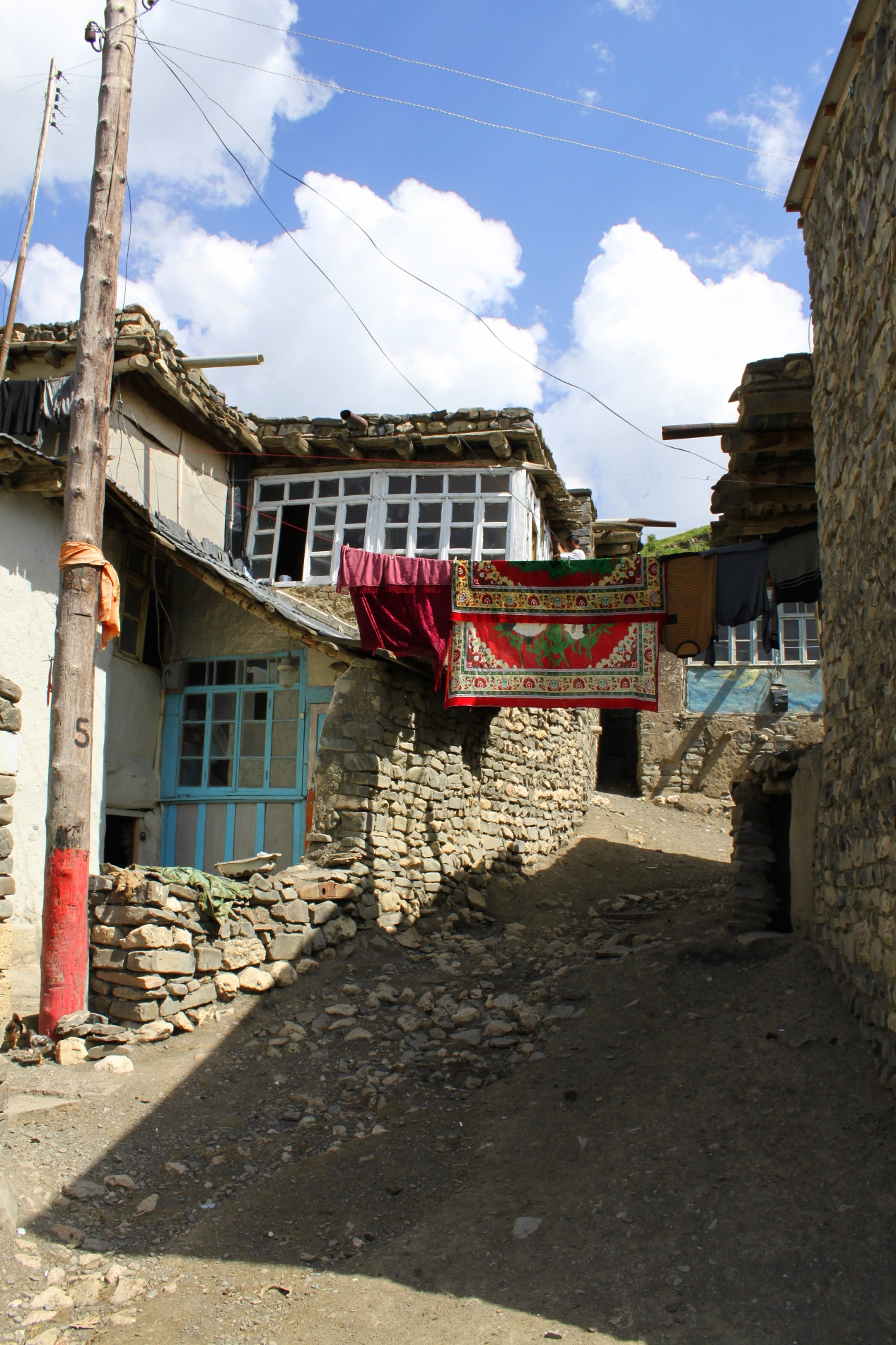

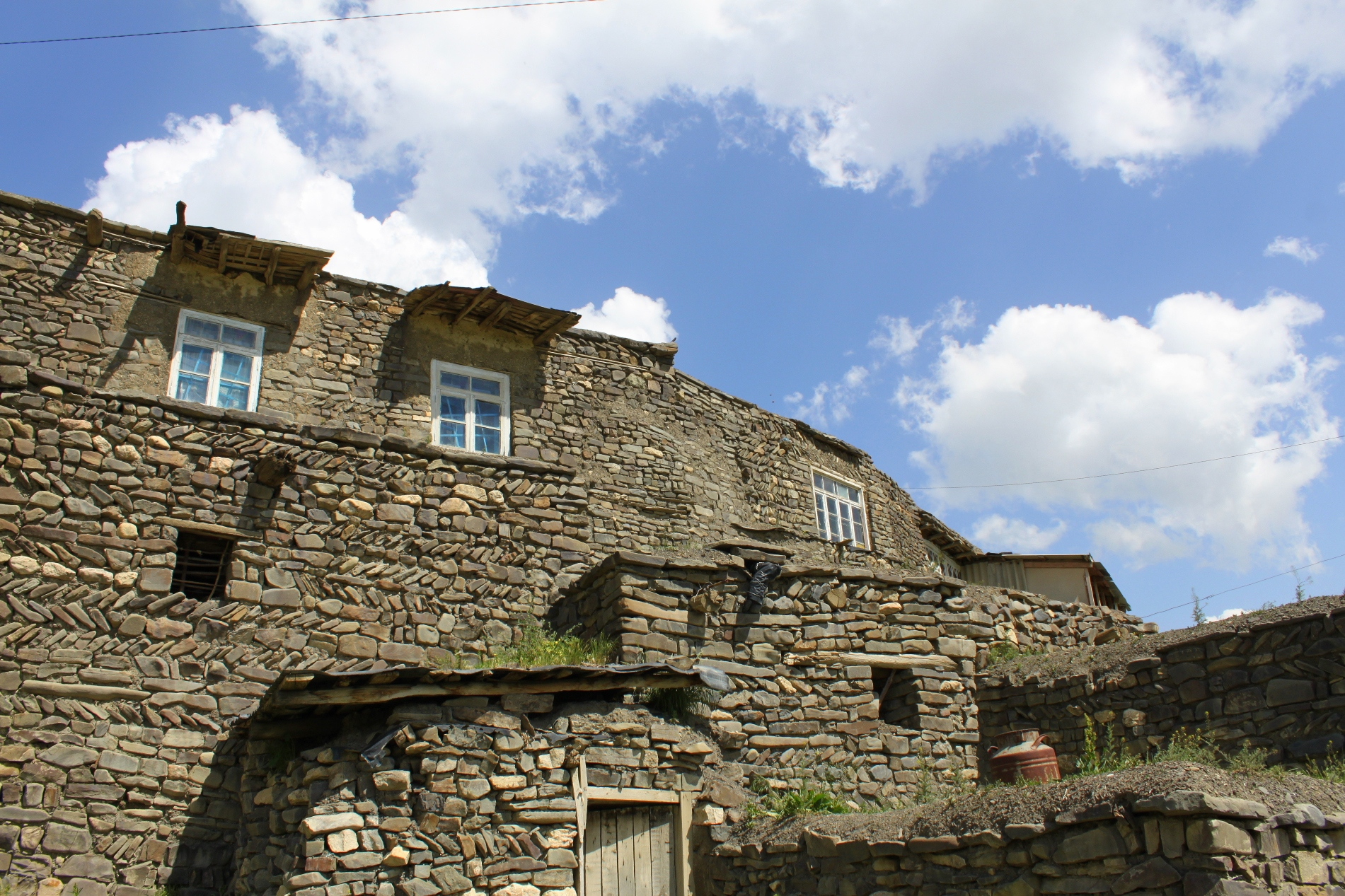

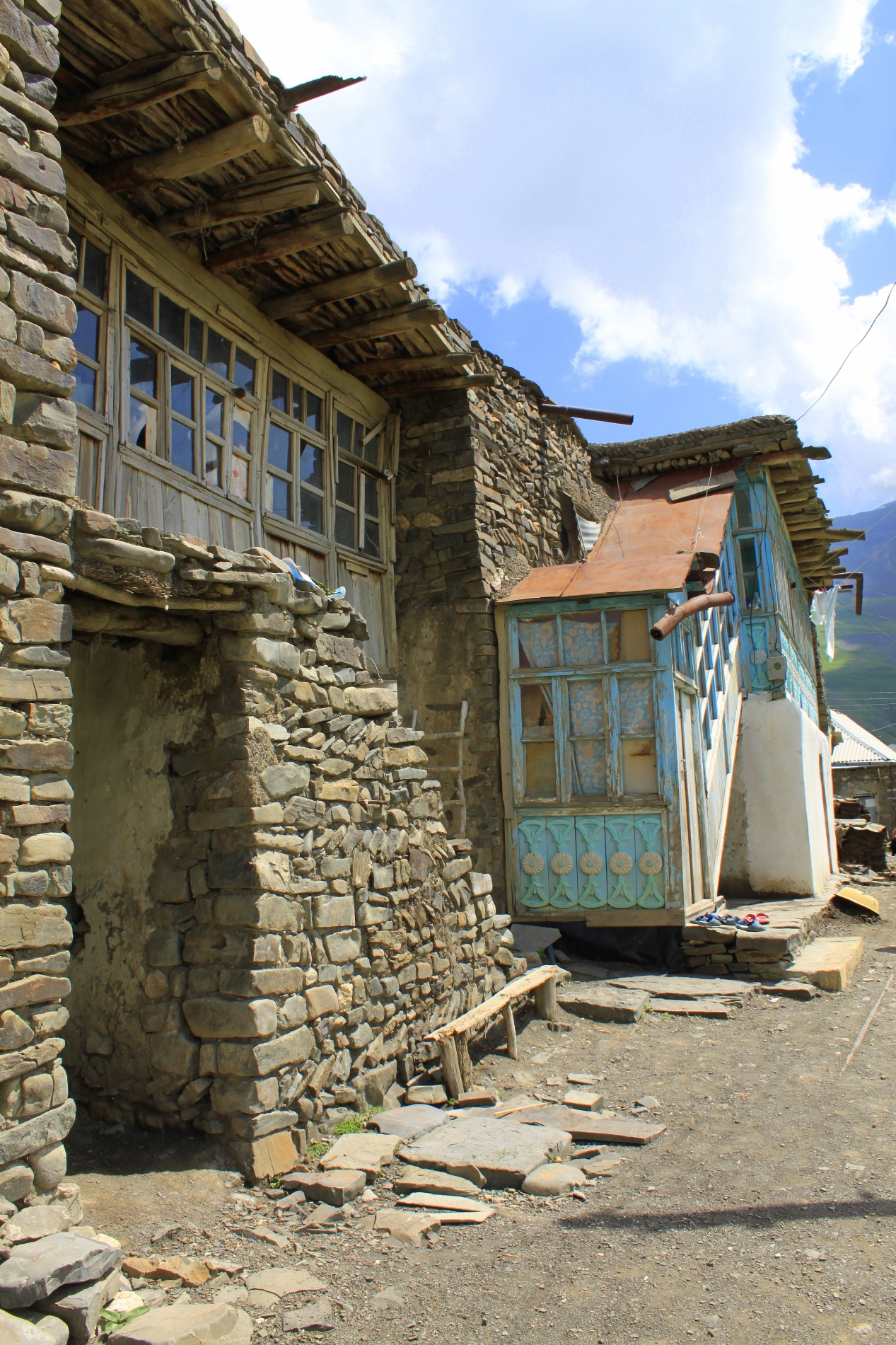

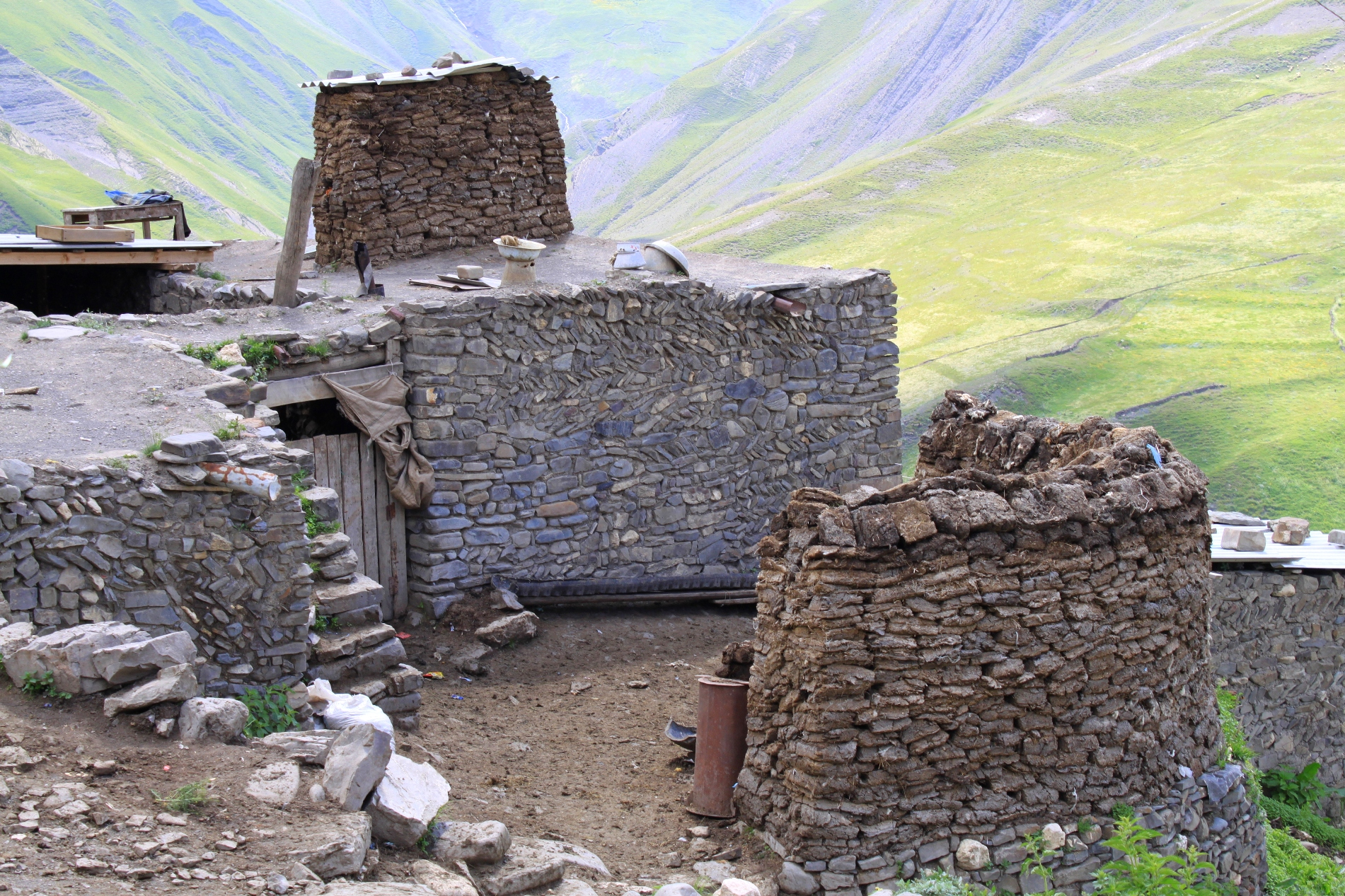
