= Külüllü, Ismailli =

Külüllü is a village in the municipality of Ivanovka, Azerbaijan, in the Ismailli Rayon of Azerbaijan.
