= Külüllü, Khizi =

Külüllü
- Location within Azerbaijan
- Coordinates: 40°45′28″N 49°20′17″E
- Country: Azerbaijan
- Rayon: Khizi
- Time zone: UTC+4 (AZT)
  - Summer (DST): UTC+5 (AZT)

Külüllü (also, Kululu) is a village in the Khizi Rayon of Azerbaijan.

The Village Is Connected to The M4 road and Neighbours Garaybayli.
