= Kyupchal =

Kyupchal may refer to:

- Küçeyi, Azerbaijan
- Küpçal, Azerbaijan
