= Zeid =

== Surname ==
- Josh Zeid (born 1987), Israeli-American Major League and Team Israel baseball pitcher
- Mahmoud Abu Zeid (born c. 1987), Egyptian photojournalist

== Other ==
- Princess Sarah Zeid of Jordan
- Ibrahim Zeid Keilani (1937–2013), Jordanian politician
- Zeid Mohamed, Egyptian technocrat
- Zeyd, Azerbaijan

== See also ==
- Zeit (disambiguation)
