= Vahid Ahmadov =

Azerbaijani politician

Vahid Ahmadov Azerbaijani: Vahid Əhmədov
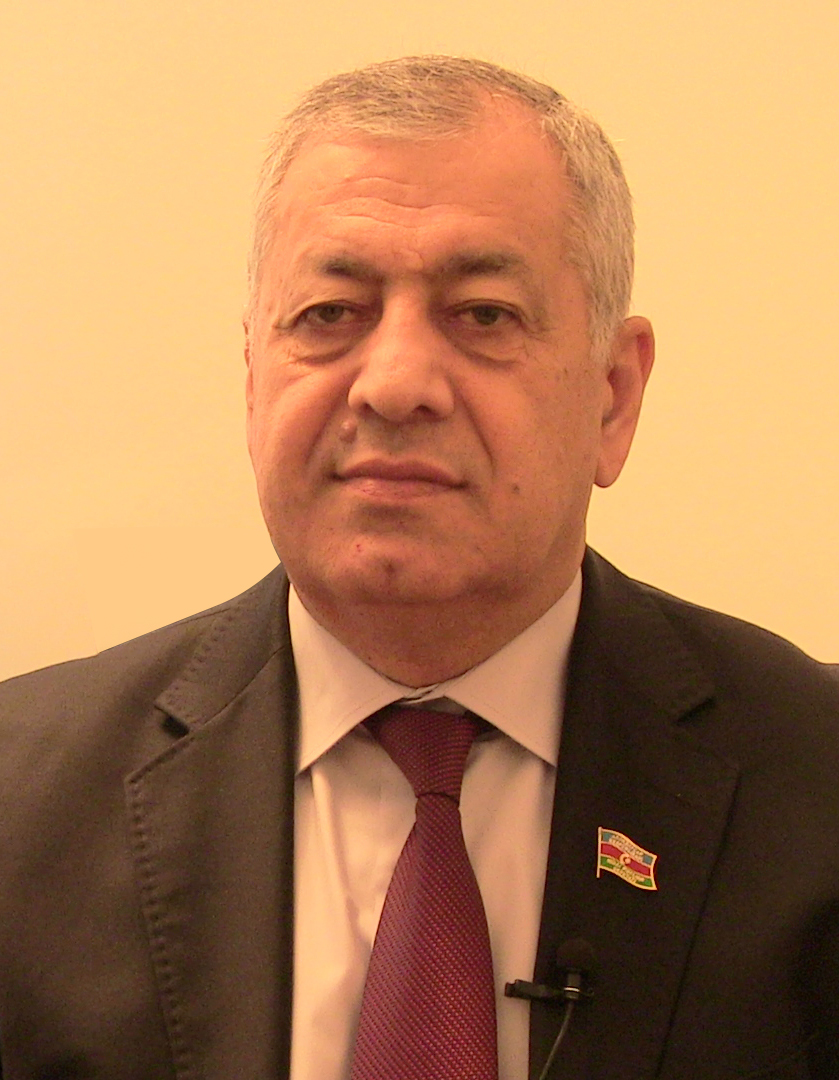

Member of the Azerbaijan Parliament for Quba District
- Incumbent
- Assumed office 6 November 2005
- Preceded by: new constituency

Personal details
- Born: 2 April 1947 (age 79) Gonagkend, Quba District, Azerbaijan SSR, Soviet Union
- Citizenship: Azerbaijan
- Committees: Standing Committee of the Milli Mejlis (Parliament) on Economic Policy; Azerbaijan-Germany, Azerbaijan-Croatia, Azerbaijan-Russia and Azerbaijan-Turkmenistan, and working groups on interparliamentary relations

Vahid Gazmammad oghlu Ahmadov (Azerbaijani: Vahid Qazməmməd oğlu Əhmədov; born 1947, Gonagkend, Quba District, Azerbaijan) is a Member of the National Assembly of Azerbaijan and Deputy chairman of Azerbaijani National Assembly's Committee on Economic Policy.

== Life ==
Born in the village of Gonagkend of Quba District, April 2, 1947.

On November 6, 2005 he was elected as Member of Parliament from Quba constituency No. 52. In the parliament, he is a deputy chair of the Standing Commission of the Milli Mejlis on Economic Policy; head of Azerbaijan-Germany, Azerbaijan-Croatia, Azerbaijan-Russia and Azerbaijan-Turkmenistan working groups on interparliamentary relations.

Vahid Ahmadov is married, with two children.
