= Damiraparanchay =

River in Azerbaijan

Coordinates: 40°54′N 47°34′E

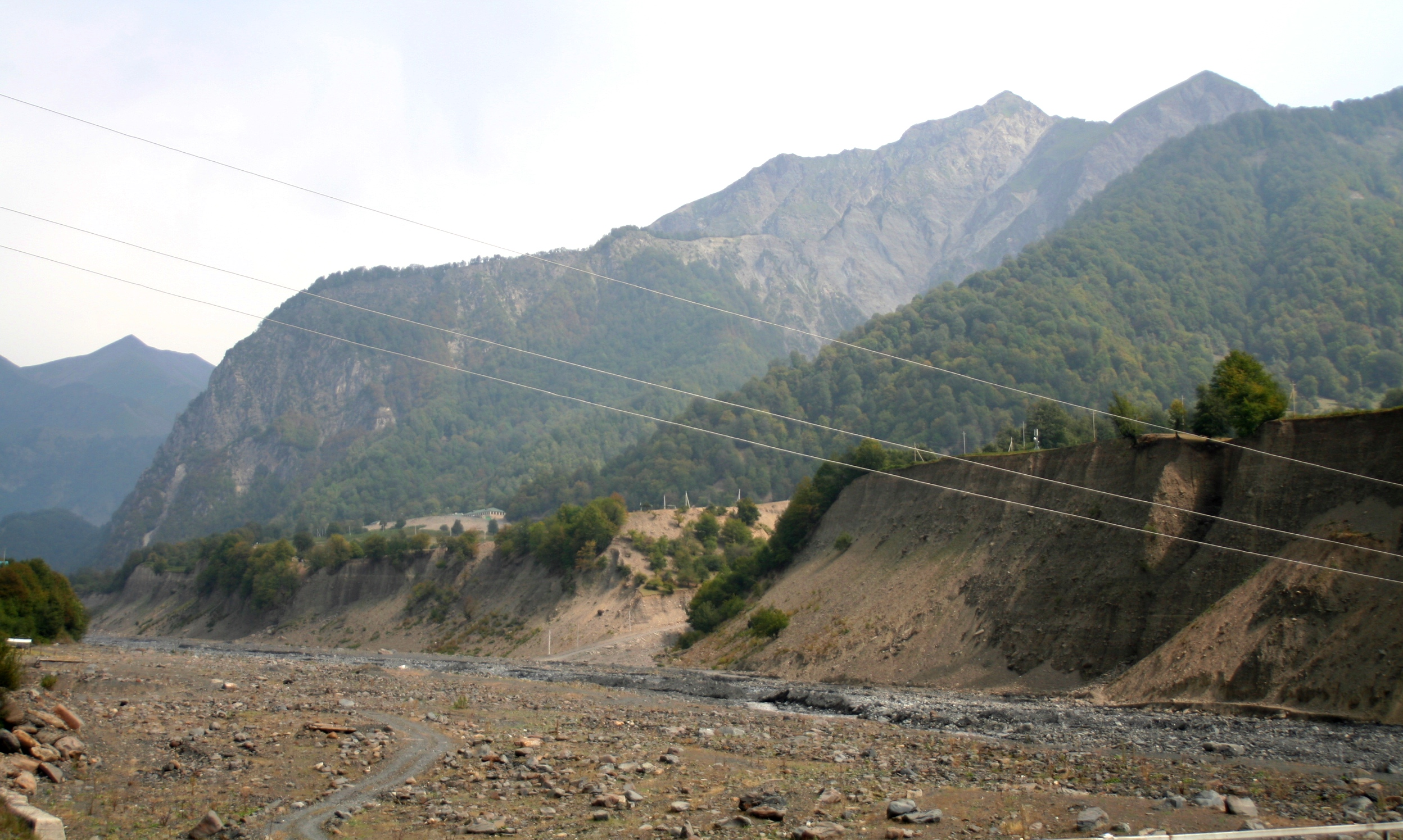
- Native name: Dəmiraparançay (Azerbaijani)

Location
- Country: Azerbaijan

Physical characteristics
- Source: Greater Caucasus
- Mouth: Kura → Caspian Sea
- Length: 69 km (43 mi)
- Basin size: 596 km^{2} (230 sq mi)

Damiraparanchay (Dəmiraparançay (Azerbaijani) - “a river that entails iron”) is a river in Azerbaijan, flowing through the territory of the Gabala district. The river originates on Mount Kurvedagh at an altitude of about 3850 m. It flows in a south-western direction through the central part of the region, branching out, it falls into the Turyanchay and Goychay rivers. The river meets Goychay at an altitude of 385 m above sea level in the southeast of the village of Bayramkokhaly. In the northern part of Gabala city, in the western direction, the Karachay channel separates from the river, which connects with the Turyanchay river in the north of the Savalan village.

The length of the river is 69 km^{2}. The catchment area of the river is 596 km^{2}.

The city of Gabala, as well as the villages of Kyusnet and Laza are located on the river. The right tributary of the river is Durjachay. Above the Muchugchay river, which is the left tributary of the Damiraparanchay river, there is the Muchug waterfall, which falls from a height of about 50 m and ranks the second in Azerbaijan after the Afurja waterfall.
