= Küsnət =

Küsnət or Kyusnet may refer to:

- Küsnət, Qabala, Azerbaijan
- Küsnət, Quba, Azerbaijan
