= Bağbanlar =

Bağbanlar (Baghbanlar) may refer to:

- Bağbanlar, Agdam, Azerbaijan
- Bağbanlar, Bilasuvar, Azerbaijan
- Bagbanlar, Ganja, Azerbaijan
- Bağbanlar, Samukh, Azerbaijan

== See also ==
- Bagbanli (disambiguation)
