= Bagbanlar =

Bagbanlar may refer to:

- Bağbanlar (disambiguation), several places in Azerbaijan
- Bagbanlar, Ganja, Azerbaijan
