= Krit =

Krit (also KRIT) may refer to:

== People ==
=== Given name ===
- Krit Srivara (General Kris Sivara) (1914–1976), Thai military officer
- Krit Ratanarak, Thai businessman
- Chakrit Yamnam, Thai actor, also called Krit

=== Surname ===
- Christina Krit (born 1976), Russian musician

=== Stage name ===
- Big K.R.I.T. (born 1986), American musician

== Other uses ==
- K-R-I-T Motor Car Company, an automobile manufacturing company
- KRIT (FM), an American radio station licensed to Parker, Arizona

== See also ==
- Qrız (also Krits), a village and municipality in the Quba Rayon of Azerbaijan
