= Bagbanli =

Bağbanlı (Baghbanly) may refer to:

- Bağbanlı, Quba, Azerbaijan
- Bağbanlar, Bilasuvar, Azerbaijan

== See also ==
- Bağbanlar (disambiguation)
