= Orta Xuç =

- Location within Azerbaijan
- Coordinates: 41°26′N 48°31′E
- Country: Azerbaijan
- Rayon: Quba
- Municipality: Aşağı Xuç
- Time zone: UTC+4 (AZT)
  - Summer (DST): UTC+5 (AZT)

Orta Xuç (also, Orta Xuc and Orta Khuch) is a village in the Quba Rayon of Azerbaijan. The village forms part of the municipality of Aşağı Xuç.
