= Paşaoba =

Village in Azerbaijan

Coordinates: 41°20′N 48°45′E

Paşaoba is a village and municipality in the Quba Rayon of Azerbaijan. It has a population of 993.
