= Mausoleums of Aghbil =

16th–17th c. Mausoleums in Ahbil, Azerbaijan

Coordinates: 41.422°N 48.558°E

- Ağbil türbələri (Azerbaijani)
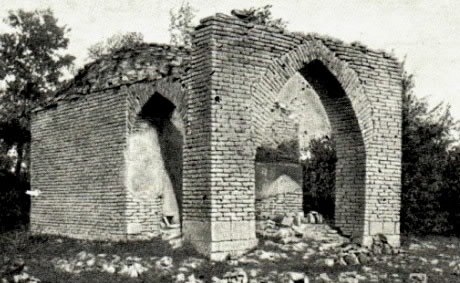
- Quadrangular mausoleum

- Mausoleum of Sheikh Maziyyad
- Type: Mausoleum
- Location: Aghbil, Guba, Azerbaijan
- Nearest city: Guba

History
- Built: 16th century (quadrangular mausoleum); 1537 (octagonal mausoleum)
- Built for: Sheikh Maziyyad

Site notes
- Architectural style: Architectural school of Arran

Mausoleums of Aghbil (Azerbaijani: Ağbil türbələri), Pirs of Aghbil (Azerbaijani: Ağbil pirləri) or Mausoleum of Sheikh Maziyyad (Azerbaijani: Şeyx Məziyyəd türbəsi), are a series of three mausoleums located in Aghbil's old cemetery in Guba, Azerbaijan.

== Mausoleum of Shah Murad ==
The square-shaped mausoleum formed a small portal site with its antes. On the inside, the mausoleum was 2.7x2.7 meters in diameter. An inscription of size 1.43x48, dates to 940 in Hijri calendar (1553 CE in Gregorian calendar), offers the name of Shah Murad, its occupant. It was completely destroyed.

== Octagonal mausoleum ==
Another, surviving, mausoleum is octagonal in shape. The mausoleum is of interest in the study of northern and southern Azerbaijani mausoleums, since it too was built in the 16th century, a period with few surviving monuments.

Its brick walls were erected on top of a small podium. Its wall and base were the same size. Therefore, the scope of the podium and main foundation differ from each other only in terms of material. This is visible in some Iranian Azerbaijani mausoleums that were made of brick.

One of its peculiar features is that it has a square floor plan of 2.8x2.8 meters on the inside, although it is octagonal on the outside. The entrance is on the southern side. On the other three sides, smaller niches of 76x50 centimeters were built. The mausoleum is built on ground-level and is 'grave-typed', which means that it has no proper crypt.

The transition from square foundation to dome cover was carried out through sails in the form of simple stalactites. It is characterized by a mixture of brick and stone-masonry for the outer walls, which is not found in other mausoleums spread over Shirvan. In addition to the podium, stones were used for the lower part of the entrance. A 53x46 cm-sized stone inscription on top of the nine-sided ceiling was placed above the entrance.

German orientalist Johannes Albrecht Bernhard Dorn, who studied these mausoleums in the 19th century, copied the inscription written. The translation of an inscription formed of three lines in Arabic is as follows:

"O my slaves, do not despair of the mercy of Allah. Indeed, Allah forgives all sins, for He is Oft-Forgiving, Most Merciful. This building was built for the son of the sultan, Sultan Khalilullah, – may Allah forever immortalize his state and happiness – Shah Murad Sheikh Mazyad Khaja Sheikh Bayazid – may Allah forgive him and all the believers – on the year of nine hundred and forty-four (1533–1534)."

== Quadrangular mausoleum ==
The third mausoleum is small. The shortest side of the rectangular plan (2.80x2.62 metres) was extended to 1.2 metres in the form of antlers. The small arch was coated with beak. It is reminiscent of a small residential building.
