= Qarovulüstü =

- Location within Azerbaijan
- Coordinates: 41°02′35″N 48°36′36″E
- Country: Azerbaijan
- Rayon: Quba
- Municipality: Qonaqkənd
- Time zone: UTC+4 (AZT)
  - Summer (DST): UTC+5 (AZT)

Qarovulüstü (also, Qaraulustü and Karovulustyu) is a village in the Quba Rayon of Azerbaijan. The village forms part of the municipality of Qonaqkənd.
