= Sırt Çiçi =

- Location within Azerbaijan
- Coordinates: 41°14′N 48°40′E
- Country: Azerbaijan
- Rayon: Quba
- Municipality: Səbətlər
- Time zone: UTC+4 (AZT)
  - Summer (DST): UTC+5 (AZT)

Sırt Çiçi (also, Sirt Çiçi, Sirk Çiçi, and Syrt Chichi) is a village in the Quba Rayon of Azerbaijan. The village forms part of the municipality of Səbətlər.
