= Səbətlər =

- Municipality
- Location within Azerbaijan
- Coordinates: 41°13′33″N 48°39′14″E
- Country: Azerbaijan
- Rayon: Quba

Population
  - Total: 1,296
- Time zone: UTC+4 (AZT)
  - Summer (DST): UTC+5 (AZT)

Səbətlər (also, Sebetlyar) is a village and municipality in the Quba Rayon of Azerbaijan. It has a population of 1,296. The municipality consists of the villages of Səbətlər and Sırt Çiçi.
