= Çayqışlaq =

- Municipality
- Location within Azerbaijan
- Country: Azerbaijan
- Rayon: Quba

Population (2009)
  - Total: 134
- Time zone: UTC+4 (AZT)
  - Summer (DST): UTC+5 (AZT)

Çayqışlaq is a village in the municipality of İsnov in the Quba Rayon of Azerbaijan.
