= Qəçrəş =

- Municipality
- Location within Azerbaijan
- Coordinates: 41°19′19″N 48°23′23″E
- Country: Azerbaijan
- Rayon: Quba

Population
  - Total: 2,175
- Time zone: UTC+4 (AZT)
  - Summer (DST): UTC+5 (AZT)

Qəçrəş (also, Kechresh) is a village and municipality in the Quba Rayon of Azerbaijan. It has a population of 2,175.
