= Nütəh =

- Municipality
- Location within Azerbaijan
- Coordinates: 40°59′48″N 48°41′39″E
- Country: Azerbaijan
- Rayon: Quba

Population
  - Total: 155
- Time zone: UTC+4 (AZT)
  - Summer (DST): UTC+5 (AZT)

Nütəh (also, Nutyakh and Nyutakh) is a village and municipality in the Quba Rayon of Azerbaijan. It has a population of 155.
