= Əliməmmədoba =

Village in Quba Rayon, Azerbaijan

Coordinates: 41°27′N 48°40′E

Əliməmmədoba is a village and municipality in the Quba Rayon of Azerbaijan. It has a population of 825.
