= Küsnətqazma =

- Location within Azerbaijan
- Coordinates: 41°16′N 48°17′E
- Country: Azerbaijan
- Rayon: Quba
- Municipality: Qımılqazma
- Time zone: UTC+4 (AZT)
  - Summer (DST): UTC+5 (AZT)

Küsnətqazma (also, Küsnət qazma and Kyusnetkazma) is a village in the Quba Rayon of Azerbaijan. The village forms part of the municipality of Qımılqazma.
