= Susay =

- Municipality
- Location within Azerbaijan
- Coordinates: 41°18′40″N 48°17′17″E
- Country: Azerbaijan
- Rayon: Quba

Population
  - Total: 701
- Time zone: UTC+4 (AZT)
  - Summer (DST): UTC+5 (AZT)

Susay is a village and municipality in the Quba Rayon of Azerbaijan. It has a population of 701.

== See also ==
- Susay Mosque
