= Xaruşa =

Human settlement in Azerbaijan

Coordinates: 41.292°N 48.697°E

Xaruşa is a village and municipality in the Quba Rayon of Azerbaijan. It has a population of 719.
