= Ördüc =

- Municipality
- Location within Azerbaijan
- Coordinates: 41°06′22″N 48°41′05″E
- Country: Azerbaijan
- Rayon: Quba

Population
  - Total: 200
- Time zone: UTC+4 (AZT)
  - Summer (DST): UTC+5 (AZT)

Ördüc (also, Orduch and Urduch) is a village and municipality in the Quba Rayon of Azerbaijan. It has a population of 200.
