= Mirzəqışlaq =

- Municipality
- Location within Azerbaijan
- Coordinates: 41°22′N 48°43′E
- Country: Azerbaijan
- Rayon: Quba

Population
  - Total: 517
- Time zone: UTC+4 (AZT)
  - Summer (DST): UTC+5 (AZT)

Mirzəqışlaq (also, Mirzakyshlak and Mirzakyshlakh) is a village and municipality in the Quba Rayon of Azerbaijan. It has a population of 517.
