= Küpçalqışlaq =

Village and municipality in Quba Rayon, Azerbaijan

Coordinates: 41°26′N 48°41′E

Küpçalqışlaq (also known as Küp-çalqışlaq) is a village and municipality in the Quba Rayon of Azerbaijan. It has a population of 352.
