= Qələdüz =

- Municipality
- Location within Azerbaijan
- Coordinates: 41°21′08″N 48°26′20″E
- Country: Azerbaijan
- Rayon: Quba

Population
  - Total: 742
- Time zone: UTC+4 (AZT)
  - Summer (DST): UTC+5 (AZT)

Qələdüz (also, Qələduz and Kaladyuz) is a village and municipality in the Quba Rayon of Azerbaijan. It has a population of 742.
