= Mirzəməmmədkənd =

- Municipality
- Location within Azerbaijan
- Coordinates: 41°23′N 48°32′E
- Country: Azerbaijan
- Rayon: Quba

Population
  - Total: 710
- Time zone: UTC+4 (AZT)
  - Summer (DST): UTC+5 (AZT)

Mirzəməmmədkənd (also, Mirzə-məmmədkənd and Mirzamamedkend) is a village and municipality in the Quba Rayon of Azerbaijan. It has a population of 710.
