= Əski İqrığ =

- Municipality
- Location within Azerbaijan
- Coordinates: 41°19′01″N 48°30′08″E
- Country: Azerbaijan
- Rayon: Quba

Population
  - Total: 325
- Time zone: UTC+4 (AZT)
  - Summer (DST): UTC+5 (AZT)

Əski İqrığ (also, Əski İqriq, Aski Igrykh, Ezki-Igrik, and Kevna-Igrykh’) is a village and municipality in the Quba Rayon of Azerbaijan. It has a population of 325.
