= Mehdiqışlaq =

- Location within Azerbaijan
- Coordinates: 41°26′N 48°44′E
- Country: Azerbaijan
- Rayon: Quba
- Time zone: UTC+4 (AZT)
  - Summer (DST): UTC+5 (AZT)

Mehdiqışlaq is a village in the Quba Rayon of Azerbaijan.
