= İsnovqışlaq =

Village and municipality in Azerbaijan

Coordinates: 41°21′N 48°45′E

İsnovqışlaq is a village and municipality in the Quba Rayon of Azerbaijan. In 2009, it had a population of 955 people.
