= Aşağı Xuç =

Aşağı Xuc
- Municipality
- Location within Azerbaijan
- Coordinates: 41°26′34″N 48°31′31″E
- Country: Azerbaijan
- Rayon: Quba
- Elevation: 494 m (1,621 ft)

Population
  - Total: 904
- Time zone: UTC+4 (AZT)
  - Summer (DST): UTC+5 (AZT)

Aşağı Xuc (also, Aşaqı Xuç, Ashaga Khuch, Ashagy-Guch, and Ashagy-Khuch) is a village and municipality in the Quba Rayon of Azerbaijan. It has a population of 904. The municipality consists of the villages of Aşagı Xuç and Orta Xuç.
