= İspik =

- Municipality
- Location within Azerbaijan
- Coordinates: 41°18′32″N 48°25′05″E
- Country: Azerbaijan
- Rayon: Quba

Population
  - Total: 1,242
- Time zone: UTC+4 (AZT)
  - Summer (DST): UTC+5 (AZT)

İspik is a village and municipality in the Quba Rayon of Azerbaijan. It has a population of 1,242.
