= Xaşı =

- Location within Azerbaijan
- Coordinates: 41°01′19″N 48°40′22″E
- Country: Azerbaijan
- Rayon: Quba
- Municipality: Qonaqkənd
- Time zone: UTC+4 (AZT)
  - Summer (DST): UTC+5 (AZT)

Xaşı (also, Khashi and Khashy) is a village in the Quba Rayon of Azerbaijan. The village forms part of the municipality of Qonaqkənd.
