= Talabıqışlaq =

- Municipality
- Location within Azerbaijan
- Coordinates: 41°19′07″N 48°43′34″E
- Country: Azerbaijan
- Rayon: Quba
- Elevation: 330 m (1,080 ft)

Population
  - Total: 1,624
- Time zone: UTC+4 (AZT)
  - Summer (DST): UTC+5 (AZT)

Talabıqışlaq (also, Orta-Talaby and Talaby) is a village and municipality in the Quba Rayon of Azerbaijan. It has a population of 1,624.
