= Gənclər =

Village in Azerbaijan

Coordinates: 41°29′N 48°38′E

Gənclər (also, Gənc-lər) is a village and municipality in the Quba Rayon of Azerbaijan. It has a population of 328.
