= Nöydün =

- Municipality
- Location within Azerbaijan
- Coordinates: 41°15′37″N 48°32′20″E
- Country: Azerbaijan
- Rayon: Quba

Population
  - Total: 300
- Time zone: UTC+4 (AZT)
  - Summer (DST): UTC+5 (AZT)

Nöydün (also, Növdün and Nëydyun) is a village and municipality in the Quba Rayon of Azerbaijan. It has a population of 300.
