= Durjachay =

River in Azerbaijan

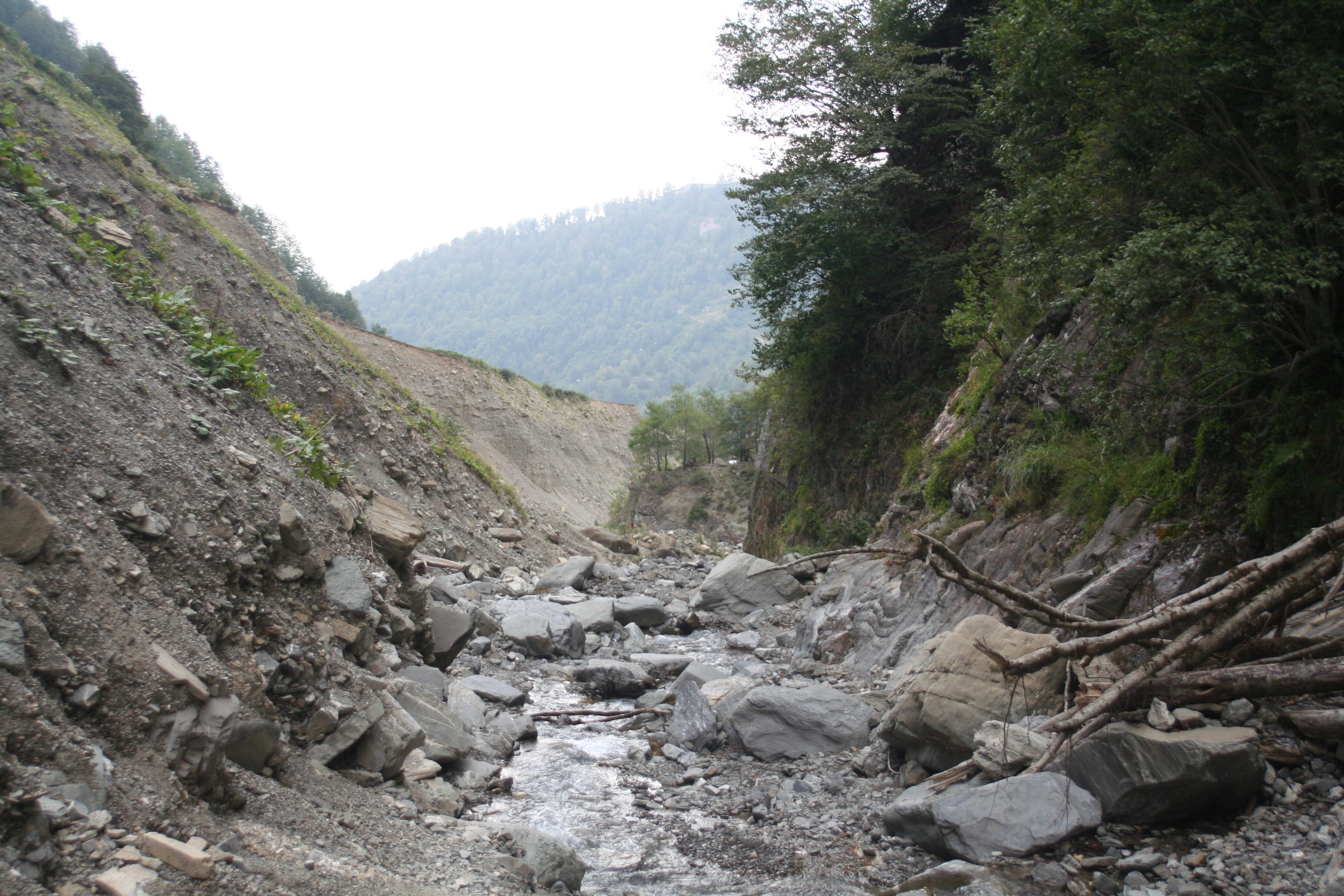
- Native name: Durcaçay (Azerbaijani)

Location
- Country: Azerbaijan

Physical characteristics
- Source: Greater Caucasus
- Mouth: Damiraparanchay
  - coordinates: 41°00′59″N 47°53′41″E
- Length: 6 km (3.7 mi)

Durjachay (Azerbaijani: Durcaçay), or Durujachay also known as Durja — is a mountain river located in the Gabala district of Azerbaijan, the right tributary of the Damiraparanchay.

== Details ==
The river, about 6 km long, originates from Mount Peygambarbulak at an altitude of about 2800 m and, flowing from north to south, flows into the Damiraparanchay river near the village of Kusnet. The village Durja is located on the Durjachay river.

In the upper drains of the Durjachay river there is a waterfall 35 m high. Also in the valley of the Durjachay river there is a large mudflow boulder with a volume of 53 m³.

In the river valley, the Lower Balakan sub-formation of the Duruja horst-anticlinorium is traced, descending to the west of the river beyond the Mount Girdagdzha. In this lane, it is distinguished by the Lower Aalenian ammonite Leioceras costosum Guensi and numerous Posidonia buchi Roem.
