= Leyti-Kazma =

- Location within Azerbaijan
- Coordinates: 41°15′N 48°49′E
- Country: Azerbaijan
- Rayon: Quba
- Time zone: UTC+4 (AZT)
  - Summer (DST): UTC+5 (AZT)

Leyti-Kazma is a village in the Quba Rayon of Azerbaijan.
