= Susay Mosque =

Former mosque in Susay, Quba, Azerbaijan

- Azerbaijani: Susay məscidi
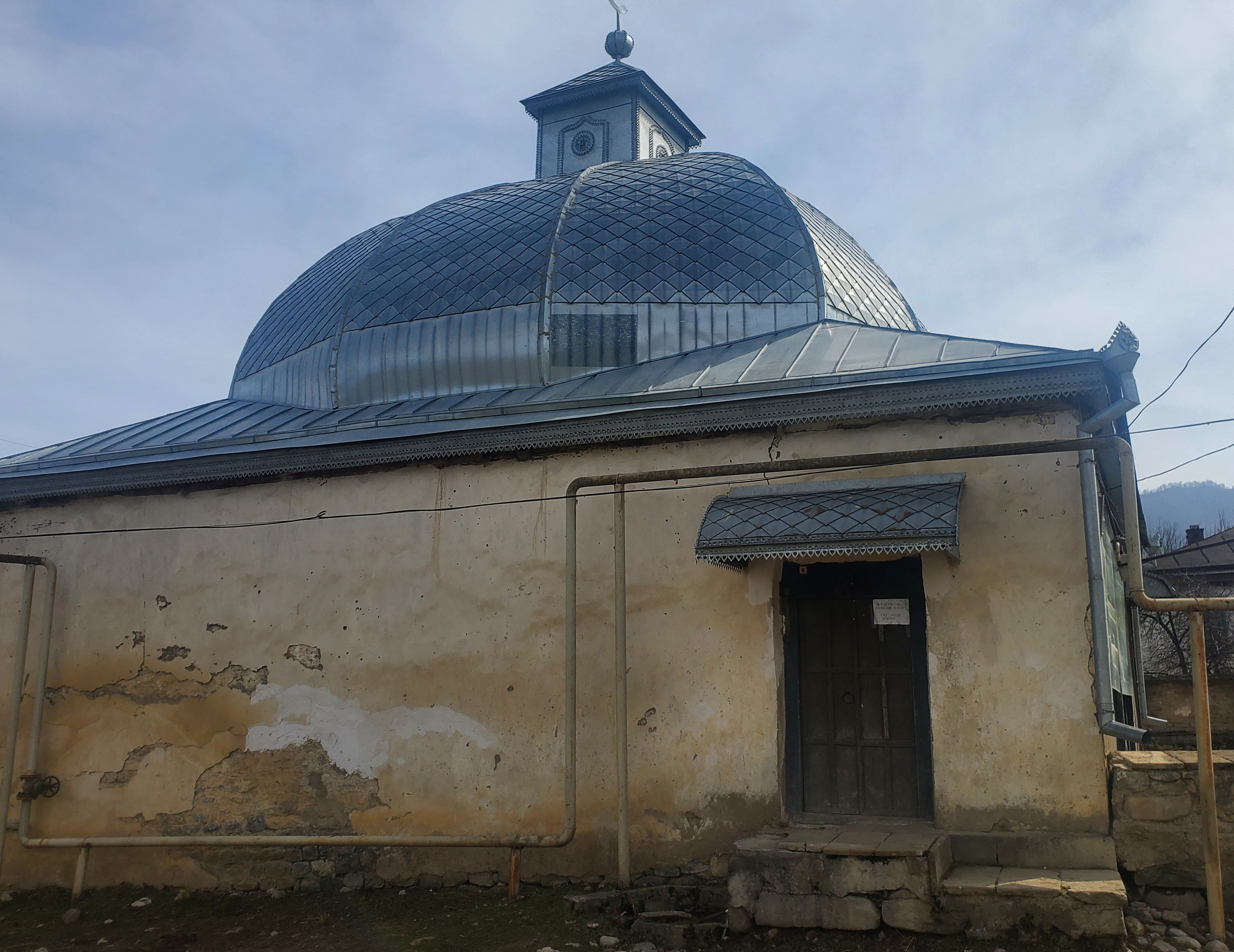
- The former mosque in 2023

- Location of the former mosque in Azerbaijan

Religion
- Affiliation: Islam (former)
- Ecclesiastical or organizational status: Mosque (c. 19th century–1928); Profane use (1928–1991); Religion (unspecific)

Location
- Location: Susay, Quba District
- Country: Azerbaijan
- Interactive map of Susay Mosque
- Coordinates: 41°18′33″N 48°17′30″E

Architecture
- Type: Mosque architecture

Specifications
- Dome: One
- Materials: Stone; bricks; timber

The Susay Mosque (Azerbaijani: Susay məscidi) is a former mosque and historic architectural monument located in Susay village of the Quba District, Azerbaijan.

The former mosque was listed among the significant local historical and cultural monuments according to Decision No. 132 of the Cabinet of Ministers of the Republic of Azerbaijan dated August 2, 2001.

== About ==
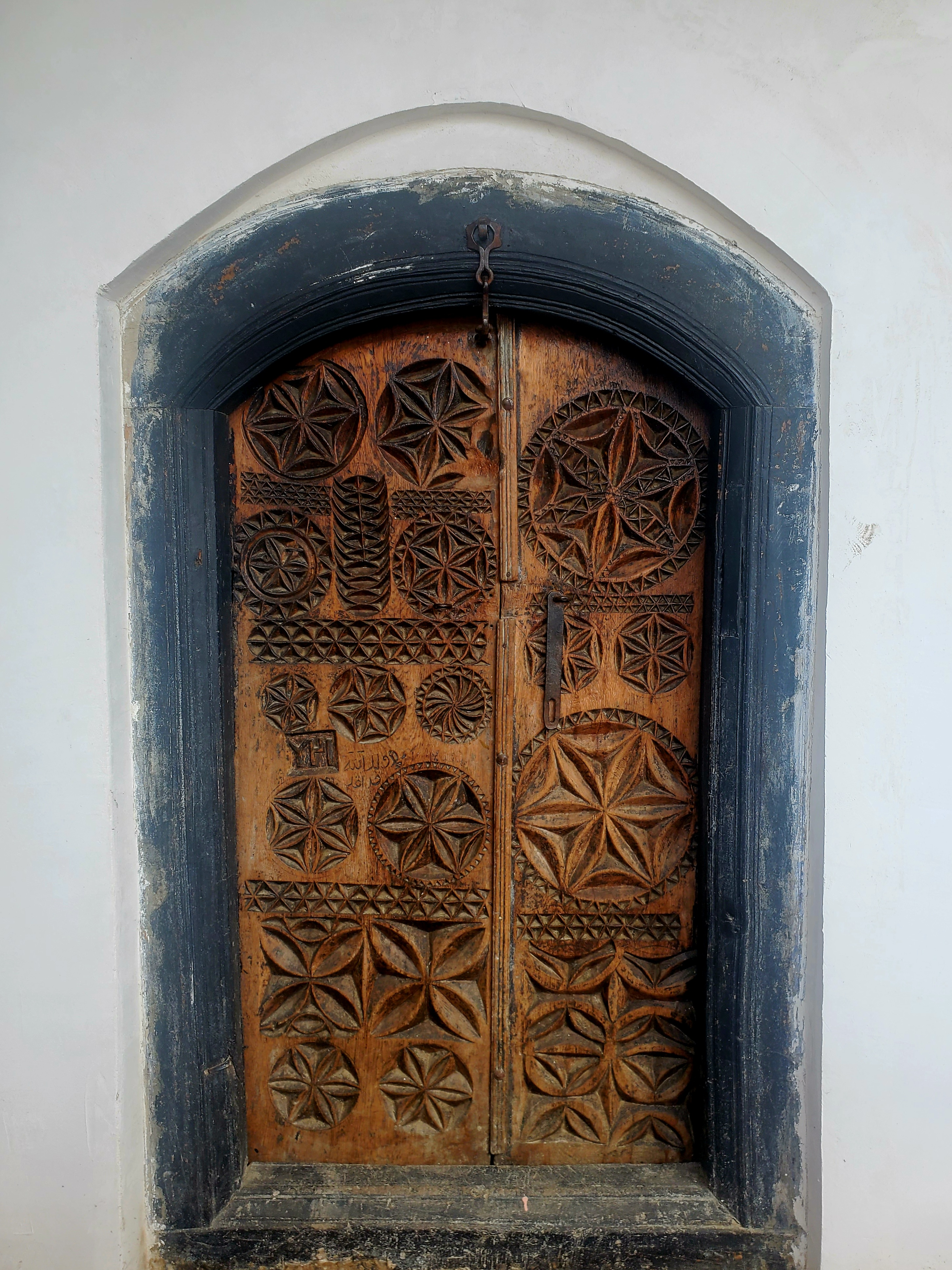

There are varying opinions regarding the construction date of the Susay Mosque, whether it was built in the 14th or the 19th century. When registered in 2001 after Azerbaijan regained independence, the mosque's construction date was indicated as 1854. However, according to the statements of the village residents, the mosque was built in the 14th century. They base this date on the inscribed date on the door of the mosque. The name of the craftsman who crafted it and the date, 721 AH (1321/1322 CE), are shown on the door made from the timber of a plane tree. Additionally, village residents claim that one of the ancient doors of the mosque was taken to London by Englishmen coming to Azerbaijan and is currently preserved in a museum in France. The construction of the mosque used river stones and bricks extracted from the nearby "Bağça dərəsi" (Garden Creek). The large columns inside the mosque with ancient markings are also made of plane tree wood. Stone slabs in the corridor of the building also bear inscriptions in Arabic script.

Soviet occupation led to the official start of an anti-religious campaign in 1928. In December of that year, the Azerbaijani Communist Party Central Committee transferred many mosques, churches, and synagogues to the balance sheets of clubs for educational purposes. If there were 3,000 mosques in Azerbaijan in 1917, by 1927 the number had reduced to 1,700, and by 1933, it was just 17. After the occupation, mosques were closed and used as warehouses.

After Azerbaijan regained independence, the mosque was included in the list of the country's significant immovable historical and cultural monuments by the decision number 132 of the Cabinet of Ministers of the Republic of Azerbaijan on August 2, 2001.

The Susay village mosque, registered with the State Committee for Work with Religious Organizations, currently operates as a religious entity.

== See also ==
- Islam in Azerbaijan
- List of mosques in Azerbaijan
