= Dağüstü =

- Location within Azerbaijan
- Coordinates: 41°11′42″N 48°23′28″E
- Country: Azerbaijan
- Rayon: Quba
- Municipality: Buduq

Population (2009)
  - Total: 114
- Time zone: UTC+4 (AZT)
  - Summer (DST): UTC+5 (AZT)

Dağüstü is a village in the Quba Rayon of Azerbaijan. The village forms part of the municipality of Buduq.
