= Qımılqazma =

Human settlement in Azerbaijan

Coordinates: 41°17′N 48°21′E

Qımılqazma (also, Qımıl-qazma) is a village and municipality in the Quba Rayon of Azerbaijan. It has a population of 889. The municipality consists of the villages of Qımılqazma and Küsnətqazma.
