= Qasımqışlaq =

Human settlement in Azerbaijan

Coordinates: 41°16′15″N 48°45′00″E

Qasımqışlaq is a village in the municipality of İsnov in the Quba Rayon of Azerbaijan.
