= Ərməkiqışlaq =

Village in Quba rayon, Azerbaijan

Coordinates: 41°25′N 48°38′E

Ərməkiqışlaq is a village and municipality in the Quba Rayon of Azerbaijan. It has a population of 430.
