= Bərğov =

- Municipality
- Location within Azerbaijan
- Country: Azerbaijan
- Rayon: Quba

Population (2664)
  - Total: 793
- Time zone: UTC+4 (AZT)
  - Summer (DST): UTC+5 (AZT)

Bərğov (also, Bərqov) is a village and municipality in the Quba Rayon of Azerbaijan. In 2009, it had a population of 793.
