= Xaltan =

- Municipality
- Location within Azerbaijan
- Coordinates: 40°58′24″N 48°41′16″E
- Country: Azerbaijan
- Rayon: Quba

Population
  - Total: 595
- Time zone: UTC+4 (AZT)
  - Summer (DST): UTC+5 (AZT)

Xaltan (also, Khaltan) is a village and municipality in the Quba Rayon of Azerbaijan. It has a population of 595.
