= Möhüc =

- Municipality
- Location within Azerbaijan
- Coordinates: 41°18′02″N 48°26′37″E
- Country: Azerbaijan
- Rayon: Quba

Population
  - Total: 1,215
- Time zone: UTC+4 (AZT)
  - Summer (DST): UTC+5 (AZT)

Möhüc (also, Megyudzh and Myugyudzh) is a village and municipality in the Quba Rayon of Azerbaijan. It has a population of 1,215.
