= Qırızdəhnə =

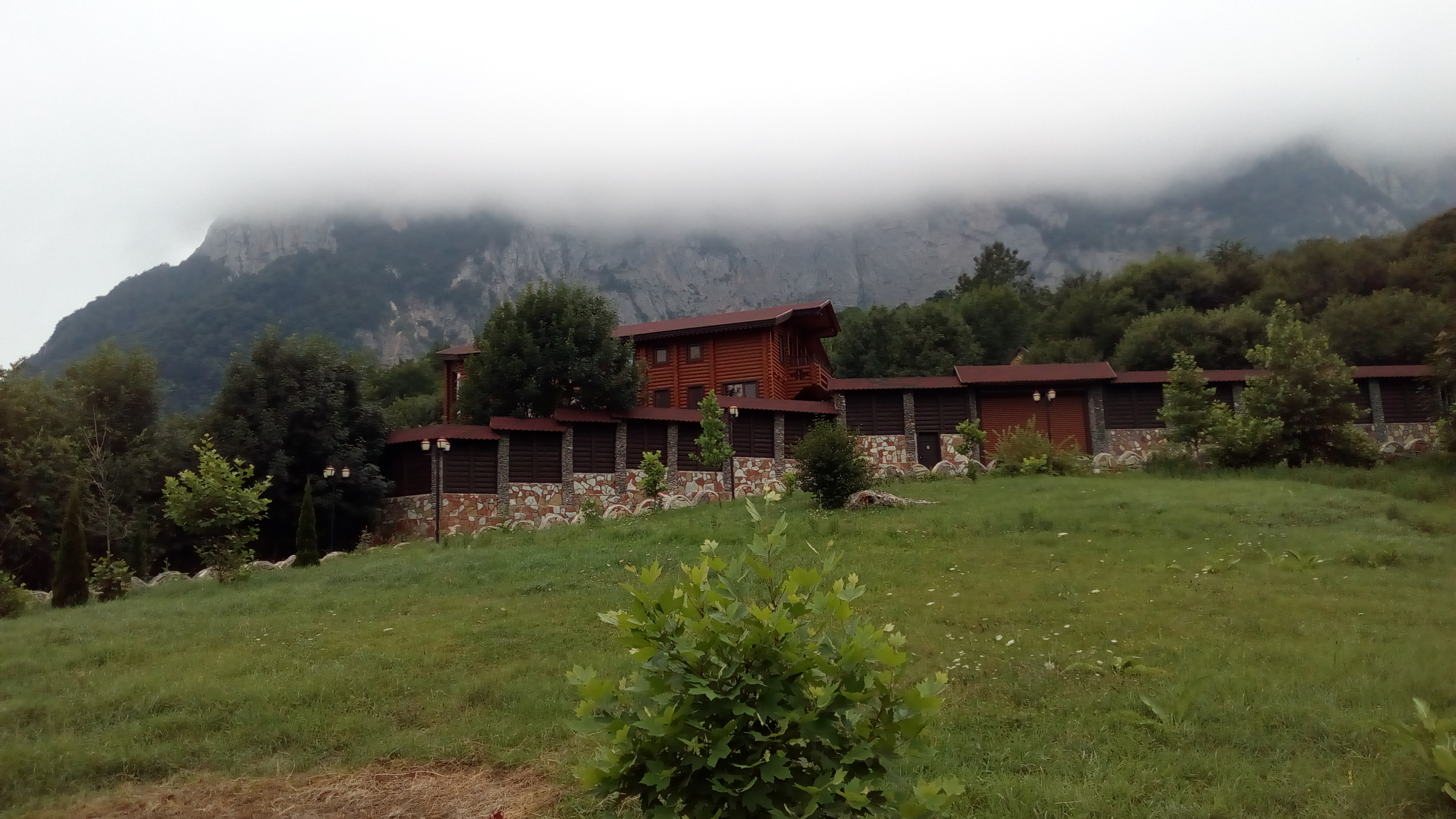

- Location within Azerbaijan
- Coordinates: 41°14′22″N 48°18′36″E
- Country: Azerbaijan
- Rayon: Quba
- Municipality: Qrız
- Time zone: UTC+4 (AZT)
  - Summer (DST): UTC+5 (AZT)

Qırızdəhnə (also, Qırız-Dəhnə) is a village in the Quba Rayon of Azerbaijan. The village forms part of the municipality of Qrız.
