= Xucbala =

- Municipality
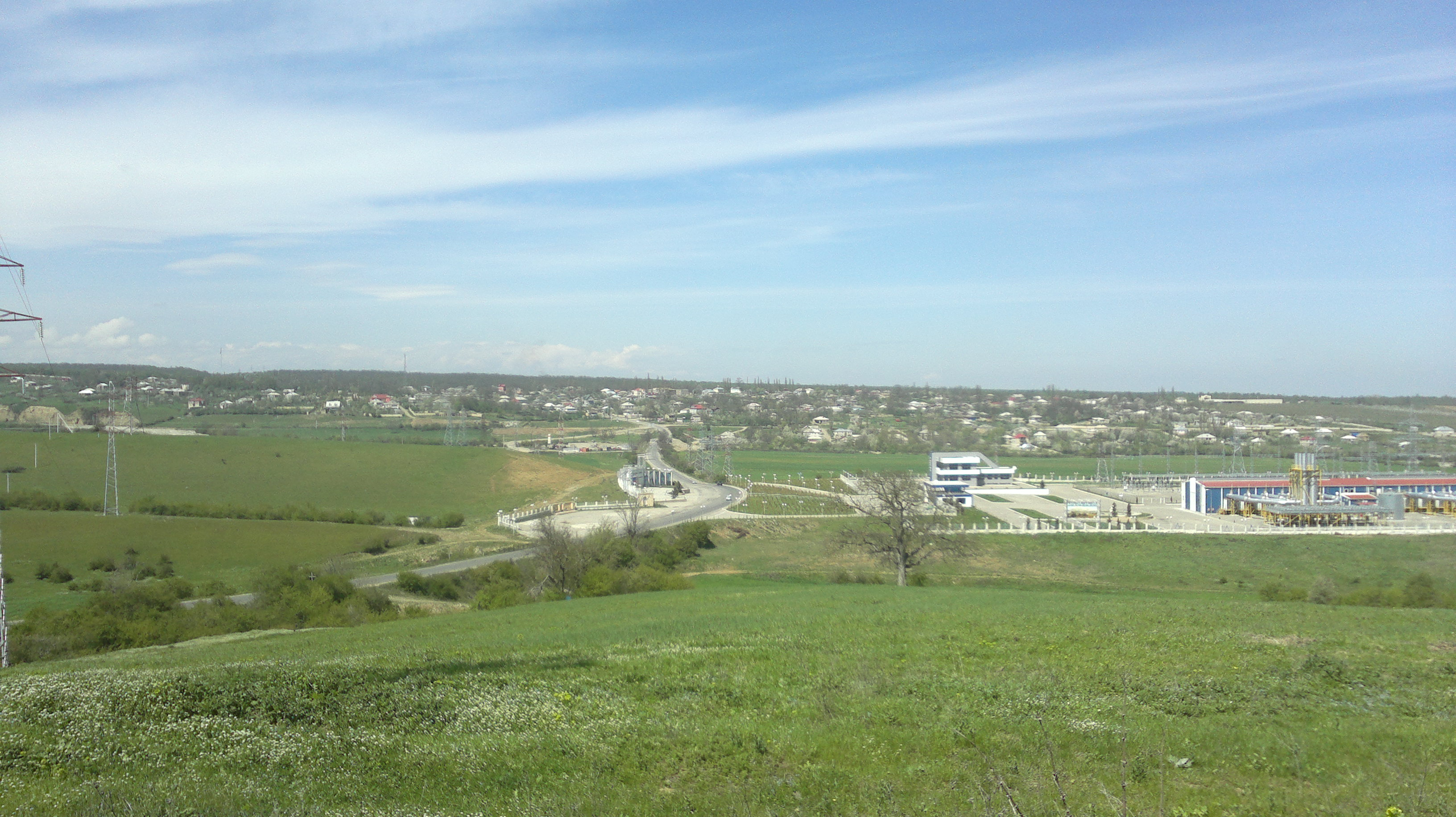

- Location within Azerbaijan
- Coordinates: 41°25′05″N 48°27′56″E
- Country: Azerbaijan
- Rayon: Quba

Population
  - Total: 1,094
- Time zone: UTC+4 (AZT)
  - Summer (DST): UTC+5 (AZT)

Xucbala (also, Khuchbala) is a village and municipality in the Quba Rayon of Azerbaijan. It has a population of 1,094.
