= Çarxaçu =

- Municipality
- Location within Azerbaijan
- Coordinates: 40°56′57″N 48°42′16″E
- Country: Azerbaijan
- Rayon: Quba

Population
  - Total: 220
- Time zone: UTC+4 (AZT)
  - Summer (DST): UTC+5 (AZT)

Çarxaçu (also, Charkhachu and Dzharkhachy) is a village and municipality in the Quba Rayon of Azerbaijan. It has a population of 220.
