= Rəngdar =

- Municipality
- Location within Azerbaijan
- Coordinates: 40°56′05″N 48°43′20″E
- Country: Azerbaijan
- Rayon: Quba

Population
  - Total: 116
- Time zone: UTC+4 (AZT)
  - Summer (DST): UTC+5 (AZT)

Rəngdar (also, Rengdar and Rengidar) is a village and the least populous municipality in the Quba Rayon of Azerbaijan. It has a population of 116.
