= Hacıqaib =

- Municipality
- Location within Azerbaijan
- Coordinates: 41°25′28″N 48°39′28″E
- Country: Azerbaijan
- Rayon: Quba

Population
  - Total: 1,310
- Time zone: UTC+4 (AZT)
  - Summer (DST): UTC+5 (AZT)

Hacıqaib (also, Hacıqayıb, Gadzhigaib, Gadzhigaibkyshlakh, Gadzhigaibkyshlakh, and Gadzhygaib) is a village and municipality in the Quba Rayon of Azerbaijan. It has a population of 1,310. The municipality consists of the villages of Hacıqaib and Mirzəqasım.
