= Cimi =

- Municipality
- Location within Azerbaijan
- Coordinates: 41°03′21″N 48°34′00″E
- Country: Azerbaijan
- Rayon: Quba

Population
  - Total: 1,082
- Time zone: UTC+4 (AZT)
  - Summer (DST): UTC+5 (AZT)

Cimi (also, Dzhimi) is a village and municipality in the Quba Rayon of Azerbaijan. It has a population of 1,082.
