= İsnov =

Village and municipality in Azerbaijan with 1,014 residents

Coordinates: 41°15′55″N 48°43′55″E

İsnov is a village and municipality in the Quba Rayon of Azerbaijan. It has a population of 1,014. The municipality consists of the villages of İsnov, Qasımqışlaq, Mahmudqışlaq, Kələnov, and Çayqışlaq.
