= Kürkün =

- Municipality
- Location within Azerbaijan
- Coordinates: 41°22′18″N 48°21′42″E
- Country: Azerbaijan
- Rayon: Quba

Population (2009)
  - Total: 349
- Time zone: UTC+4 (AZT)
  - Summer (DST): UTC+5 (AZT)

Kürkün (also, Kyurkyun) is a village and municipality in the Quba Rayon of Azerbaijan. It had a population of 349 in 2009.
