= Mirzəqasım =

- Location within Azerbaijan
- Coordinates: 41°24′52″N 48°39′34″E
- Country: Azerbaijan
- Rayon: Quba
- Municipality: Hacıqaib
- Time zone: UTC+4 (AZT)
  - Summer (DST): UTC+5 (AZT)

Mirzəqasım (also, Mirza-Kasum-Kend and Mirzakasym) is a village in the Quba Rayon of Azerbaijan. The village forms part of the municipality of Hacıqaib.
