= İbrahimhapıt =

- Location within Azerbaijan
- Coordinates: 41°21′05″N 48°47′45″E
- Country: Azerbaijan
- Rayon: Quba

Population (2014)
  - Total: 0
- Time zone: UTC+4 (AZT)
  - Summer (DST): UTC+5 (AZT)

İbrahimhapıt (also, İbrahim Haput, Ibragim-Gaput, and Ibragimgapyt) is a former village in the Quba Rayon of Azerbaijan.
