= Barli =

Barli may refer to:

- Barli Vocational Institute for Rural Women in Indore
- Barlı, Azerbaijan
- Barli, Vizianagaram, a village in Vizianagaram district, Andhra Pradesh
- Barli Inscription
