= Laza, Azerbaijan =

Laza, Azerbaijan may refer to:

- Laza, Qabala, Azerbaijan
- Laza, Qusar, Azerbaijan
