= Əlibəyqışlaq =

- Municipality
- Location within Azerbaijan
- Coordinates: 41°24′41″N 48°32′23″E
- Country: Azerbaijan
- Rayon: Quba

Population
  - Total: 881
- Time zone: UTC+4 (AZT)
  - Summer (DST): UTC+5 (AZT)

Əlibəyqışlaq (also, Alibekkyshlakh and Alibeykyshlak) is a village and municipality in the Quba Rayon of Azerbaijan. It has a population of 881.
