= Kələnov =

Human settlement in Azerbaijan

Coordinates: 41°14′50″N 48°44′10″E

Kələnov (also, Kələnnov, previously Gilyanov from Russian: Гилянов) is a village in the municipality of İsnov in the Quba Rayon of Azerbaijan.
