= Mahmudqışlaq =

Human settlement in Azerbaijan

Coordinates: 41°15′52″N 48°45′3″E

Mahmudqışlaq is a village in the municipality of İsnov in the Quba Rayon of Azerbaijan.
