= Amsarqışlaq =

- Municipality
- Location within Azerbaijan
- Country: Azerbaijan
- Rayon: Quba

Population (2009)
  - Total: 844
- Time zone: UTC+4 (AZT)
  - Summer (DST): UTC+5 (AZT)

Amsarqışlaq is a village and municipality in the Quba Rayon of Azerbaijan.
