= Çartəpə =

- Municipality
- Location within Azerbaijan
- Coordinates: 41°26′N 48°29′E
- Country: Azerbaijan
- Rayon: Quba

Population
  - Total: 706
- Time zone: UTC+4 (AZT)
  - Summer (DST): UTC+5 (AZT)

Çartəpə (also, Chartapa and Chartepe) is a village and municipality in the Quba Rayon of Azerbaijan. It has a population of 706.
