= Küpçal =

- Municipality
- Location within Azerbaijan
- Coordinates: 41°19′25″N 48°22′14″E
- Country: Azerbaijan
- Rayon: Quba

Population
  - Total: 471
- Time zone: UTC+4 (AZT)
  - Summer (DST): UTC+5 (AZT)

Küpçal (also, Kyupchal) is a village and municipality in the Quba Rayon of Azerbaijan. It has a population of 471.
