= Qaraçay =

Village in Quba Rayon, Azerbaijan

Coordinates: 41°21′N 48°39′E

Qaraçay is a village and municipality in the Quba Rayon of Azerbaijan. It has a population of 1,245.
