= Zeyid =

- Location within Azerbaijan
- Coordinates: 41°10′59″N 48°20′02″E
- Country: Azerbaijan
- Rayon: Quba
- Municipality: Buduq
- Elevation: 1,760 m (5,770 ft)

Population (2009)
  - Total: 252
- Time zone: UTC+4 (AZT)
  - Summer (DST): UTC+5 (AZT)

Zeyid (also, Zeid and Zeyd) is a village in the Quba Rayon of Azerbaijan. The village forms part of the municipality of Buduq.
