= Buduq =

Budug
- Municipality
- Azerbaijani: Buduq
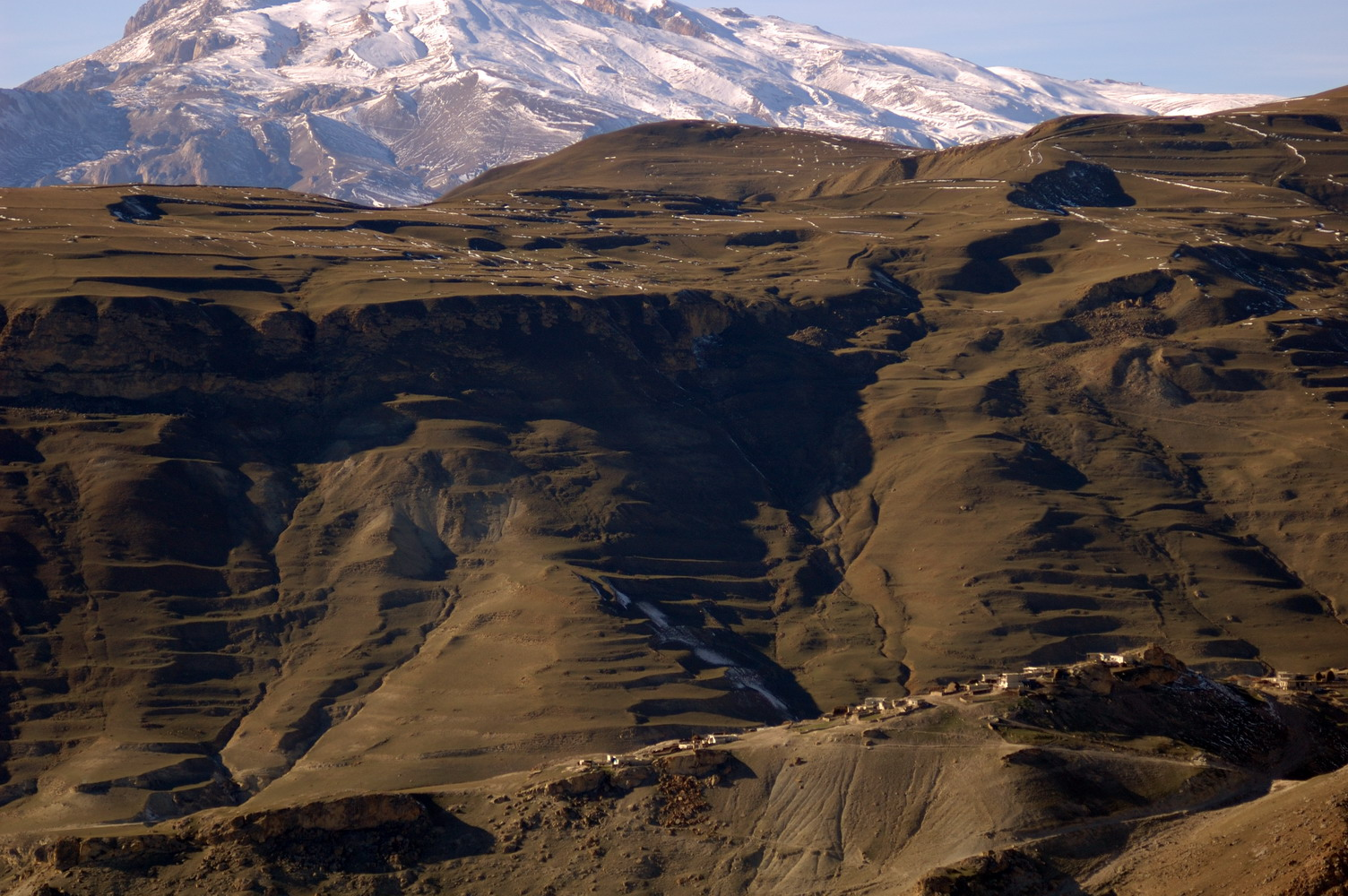

- Location within Azerbaijan
- Coordinates: 41°11′10″N 48°22′07″E
- Country: Azerbaijan
- District: Quba
- Elevation: 1,760 m (5,770 ft)

Population
  - Total: 516
- Time zone: UTC+4 (AZT)
  - Summer (DST): UTC+5 (AZT)

Buduq (Budug) is a village and municipality in Quba District of Azerbaijan. It has a population of 516. The municipality consists of the villages of Budug, Dağüstü, and Zeyid.

== Population ==
Although the village used to have a large population, it is now almost empty and becoming more deserted each year.

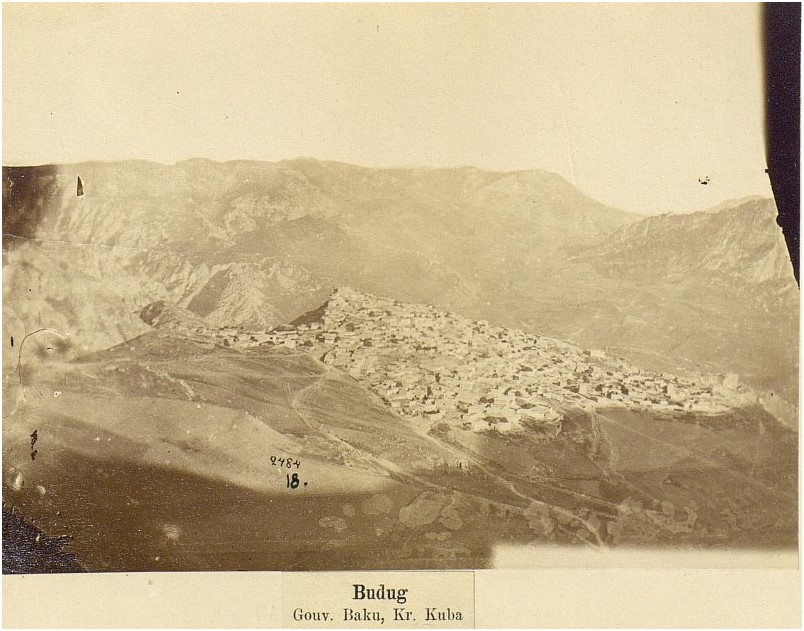
Budug, 1880
