= Zardabi =

- Municipality
- Azerbaijani: Zərdabi
- Location within Azerbaijan
- Coordinates: 41°23′56″N 48°38′38″E
- Country: Azerbaijan
- District: Quba

Population (2010)
  - Total: 4,131
- Time zone: UTC+4 (AZT)
  - Summer (DST): UTC+5 (AZT)

Zərdabi (also, Zardabi) is a village and municipality in the Quba District of Azerbaijan. It has a population of 4,034.
