= Ağbil =

- Municipality
- Location within Azerbaijan
- Coordinates: 41°25′N 48°34′E
- Country: Azerbaijan
- Rayon: Quba
- Elevation: 432 m (1,417 ft)

Population
  - Total: 959
- Time zone: UTC+4 (AZT)
  - Summer (DST): UTC+5 (AZT)

Ağbil is a village and municipality in the Quba Rayon of Azerbaijan. It has a population of 959.
