= Küsnət, Quba =

Küsnət
- Municipality
- Location within Azerbaijan
- Coordinates: 41°16′34″N 48°19′21″E
- Country: Azerbaijan
- Rayon: Quba

Population
  - Total: 233
- Time zone: UTC+4 (AZT)
  - Summer (DST): UTC+5 (AZT)

Küsnət (also, Kyusnet) is a village and municipality in the Quba Rayon of Azerbaijan. It has a population of 233.
