= Bağbanlı, Quba =

Baghbanly
- Municipality
- Azerbaijani: Bağbanlı
- Location within Azerbaijan
- Country: Azerbaijan
- District: Quba

Population
  - Total: 1,562
- Time zone: UTC+4 (AZT)
  - Summer (DST): UTC+5 (AZT)

Bağbanlı (Baghbanly) is a village and municipality in the Quba District of Azerbaijan. It has a population of 1,562.

== Climate ==
This region of Azerbaijan has a temperate climate. The temperature of Baghbanly is 12.0 °C on average. August is typically the warmest month.
