= Christina Krit =

- Born: Christina Valeryevna Krit; September 24, 1976 (age 49); Rostov-on-Don, USSR
- Genres: Jazz
- Occupations: Pianist, teacher
- Instrument: Piano
- Years active: 1997–present

Christina Krit (born September 24, 1976, in Rostov-on-Don) is a jazz pianist, teacher, composer and arranger.

== Biography ==
Christina Valeryevna Krit was born on September 24, 1976, in Rostov-on-Don. She graduated from the Gnessin School of Music where she studied piano. In 1998, she graduated from the S. R. Rachmaninoff Rostov State Conservatory's jazz and modern program for piano (Professor Nazaretov and Docent Budina), and in 2001, she completed her apprenticeship for chamber ensemble performances (creative director, V. G. Budarin).

From 1997 to 2003, she played in the North Caucasus Military District Big Band and in the Tekuchyov Brothers Ensemble. She was a member of the Rostov ensemble Hi-Fly for several years as well.

In 1999, she began working at the Rachmaninoff Rostov State Conservatory as a concertmaster and teacher in the ensemble program within the department of jazz and modern music. In the years that followed, she taught the disciplines of improvisation, pedagogical methods for special disciplines, instrumentation, arrangement, and piano performance. In 2011, she received the title of docent, and since 2013, she has been chair of the department of jazz and modern music.

Many of Christina Valeryevna's ensemble students have won prizes in Russian and international contests for young jazz performers.

She has been a member of the jury of the Gnesin Jazz international festival and contest for young jazz performers since 2014.

From 2011 to 2018, she was the soloist, concertmaster of the rhythm section, and arranger of the Kim Nazaretov Rostov State Philharmonic Orchestra.

Krit is a permanent member of several Russian and international jazz festivals including Jazz Province, Jazz in the Hermitage Garden, Jazz on the Volga, Za Jazz, The Charm of Jazz, Gnesin Jazz, and Kuban-Jazz.

As an arranger, she works with the academic band under the direction of A. Kroll, the K. Nazaretov Jazz Orchestra, the jazz and modern music department's big band, the Rostov Academic Symphony Orchestra, the G. Garanyan Big Band of Krasnodar, the N. Yedzhik Wind Orchestra, the orchestra under the direction of North Caucasus Regional Command, and others.

Krit also serves as the leader of the All Star Woman Jazz-Band.

== Discography ==
- City Jazz for Small Cafe (2007)

== Awards ==
- First-prize laureate at the Oleg Lundstrem International Jazz Competition.

== Bibliography ==
- Motley Life. Plays and ensembles for clarinet and saxophone. Rostov-on-Don: Phoenix, 2006. ISBN 5-222-09990-3
- Jazz toys. Piano plays for middle and high music school. Rostov-on-Don: Phoenix, 2006. ISBN 5-222-09473-1.
- Jazz toys - 2. Piano plays for middle and high music school. Rostov-on-Don: Phoenix, 2007. ISBN 978-5-222-10661-7.
- Jazz toys - 3. Piano plays and ensembles for piano for music schools. Rostov-on-Don: Phoenix, 2007. ISBN 978-5-222-12154-2.
- Black-and-white stories: Jazz piano transcriptions. Rostov-on-Don: Phoenix, 2007. ISBN 978-5-222-11835-1
- Jazz piano transcriptions: chrestomathy for musical universities and specialized secondary schools. Rostov-on-Don: Rostov State Conservatory named after Rachmaninov, 2014.
- Jazz debut. Piano. Plays and ensembles. Junior and middle classes of music school for children. Saint Petersburg: Compositor, 2014.
- Jazz debut - 2. Piano. Plays and ensembles. Junior and middle classes of music school for children. Saint Petersburg: Compositor, 2016.
