= Bağbanlar, Agdam =

Baghbanlar
- Azerbaijani: Bağbanlar
- Location within Azerbaijan
- Coordinates: 39°55′51″N 47°00′43″E
- Country: Azerbaijan
- District: Aghdam
- Time zone: UTC+4 (AZT)

Bağbanlar (Baghbanlar) is a village in the Aghdam District of Azerbaijan.

== History ==
The village was occupied by Armenian forces during the First Nagorno-Karabakh war and all its original Azerbaijani inhabitants were expelled. During its occupation, it was administered as part of Martuni Province of the self-proclaimed Republic of Artsakh and was renamed Բաղբանլար. The village was given back to Azerbaijan on 20 November 2020 per the 2020 Nagorno-Karabakh ceasefire agreement.

== See also ==
- List of populated places in Martakert province
