= Qrız =

- Municipality
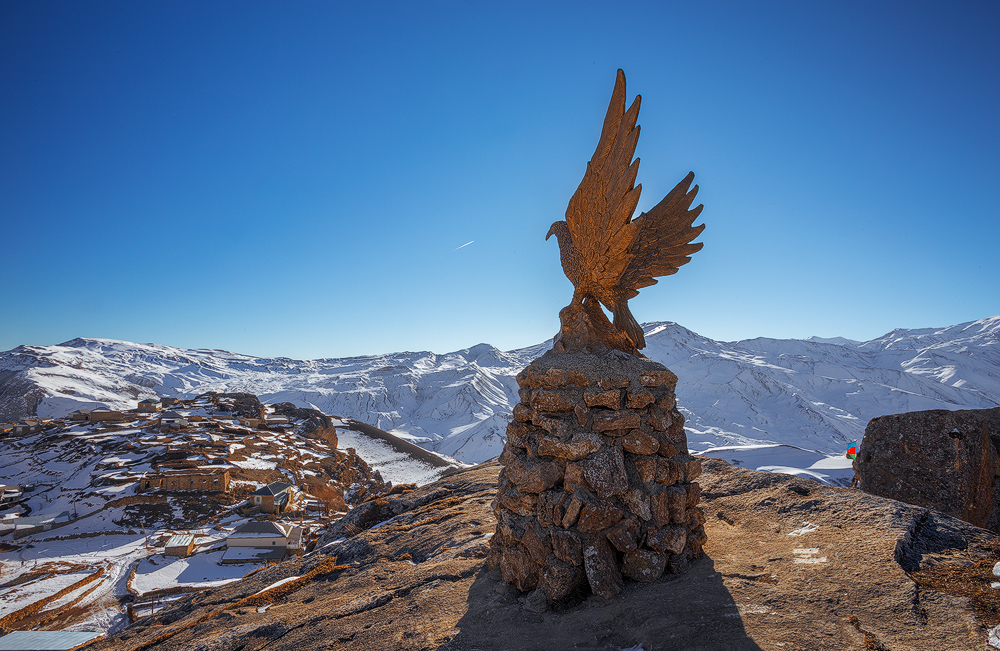

- Location within Azerbaijan
- Coordinates: 41°12′56″N 48°14′48″E
- Country: Azerbaijan
- Rayon: Quba

Population
  - Total: 368
- Time zone: UTC+4 (AZT)
  - Summer (DST): UTC+5 (AZT)

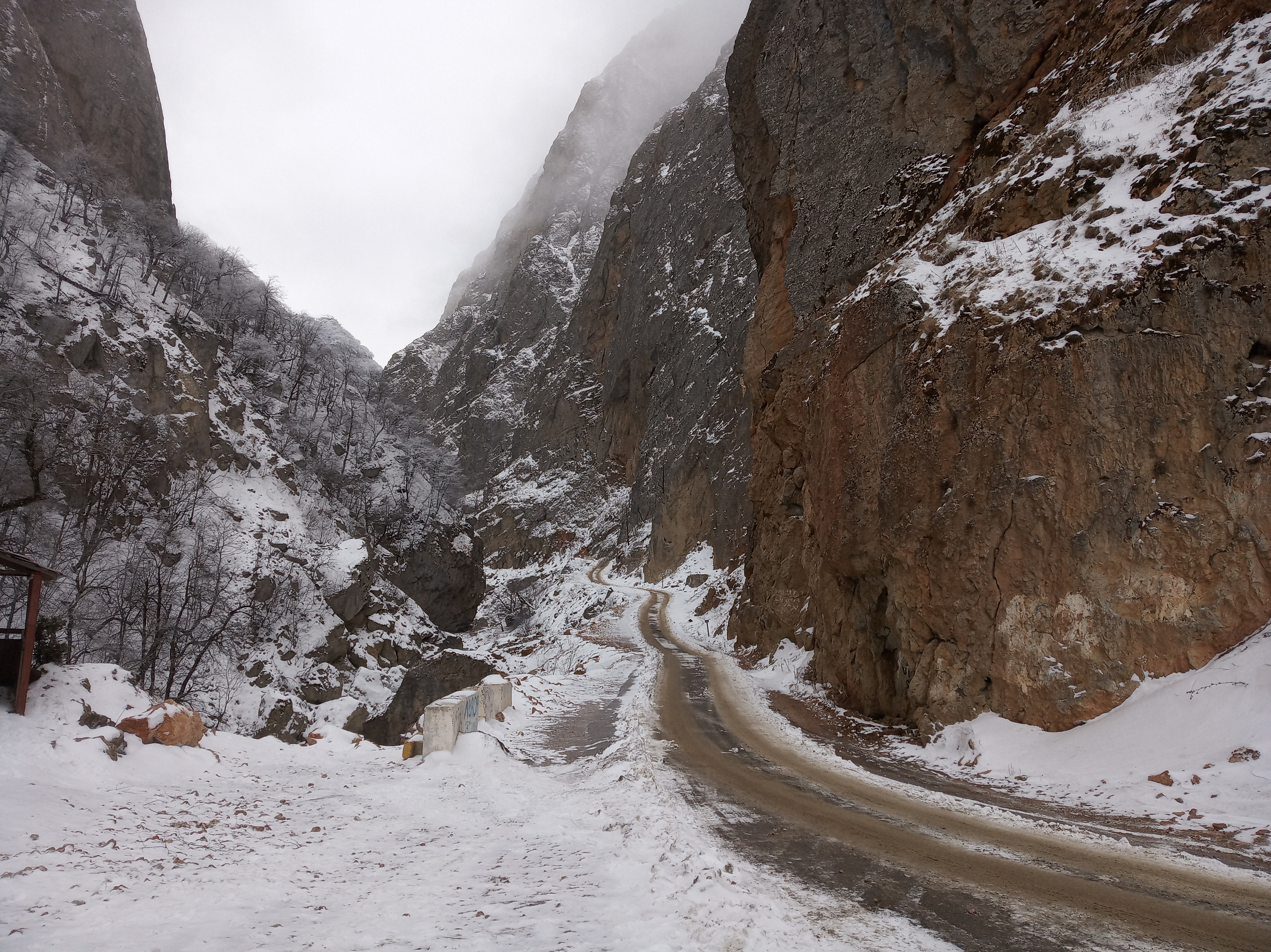
Shahdag National Park

Qrız (also, Griz, Giriz, Krits, Kriz, and Kyryz) is a village and municipality in the Quba Rayon of Azerbaijan. It has a population of 368. The municipality consists of the villages of Qrız and Qırızdəhnə.

They speak their own local language.

Their houses are made partly out of picked wooden sticks and stones in the near forests.

There is a mosque located in the center of the village.

It's not possible to get to the village by a personal car, only by foot or 4x4 Land Rover.

Locals usually earn living by keeping animals and grazing them.

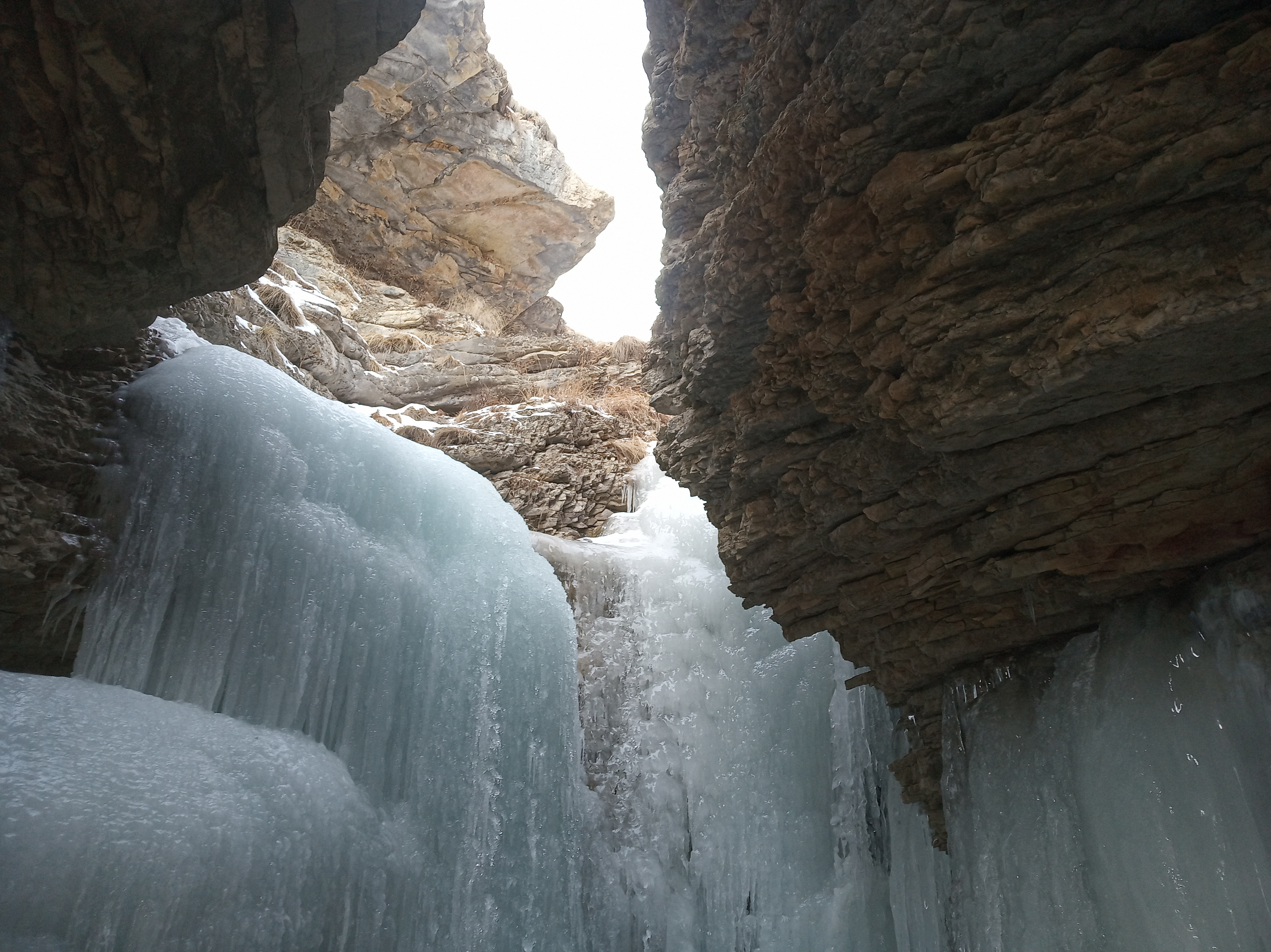
Nature of Qrız
