= Barlı =

- Municipality
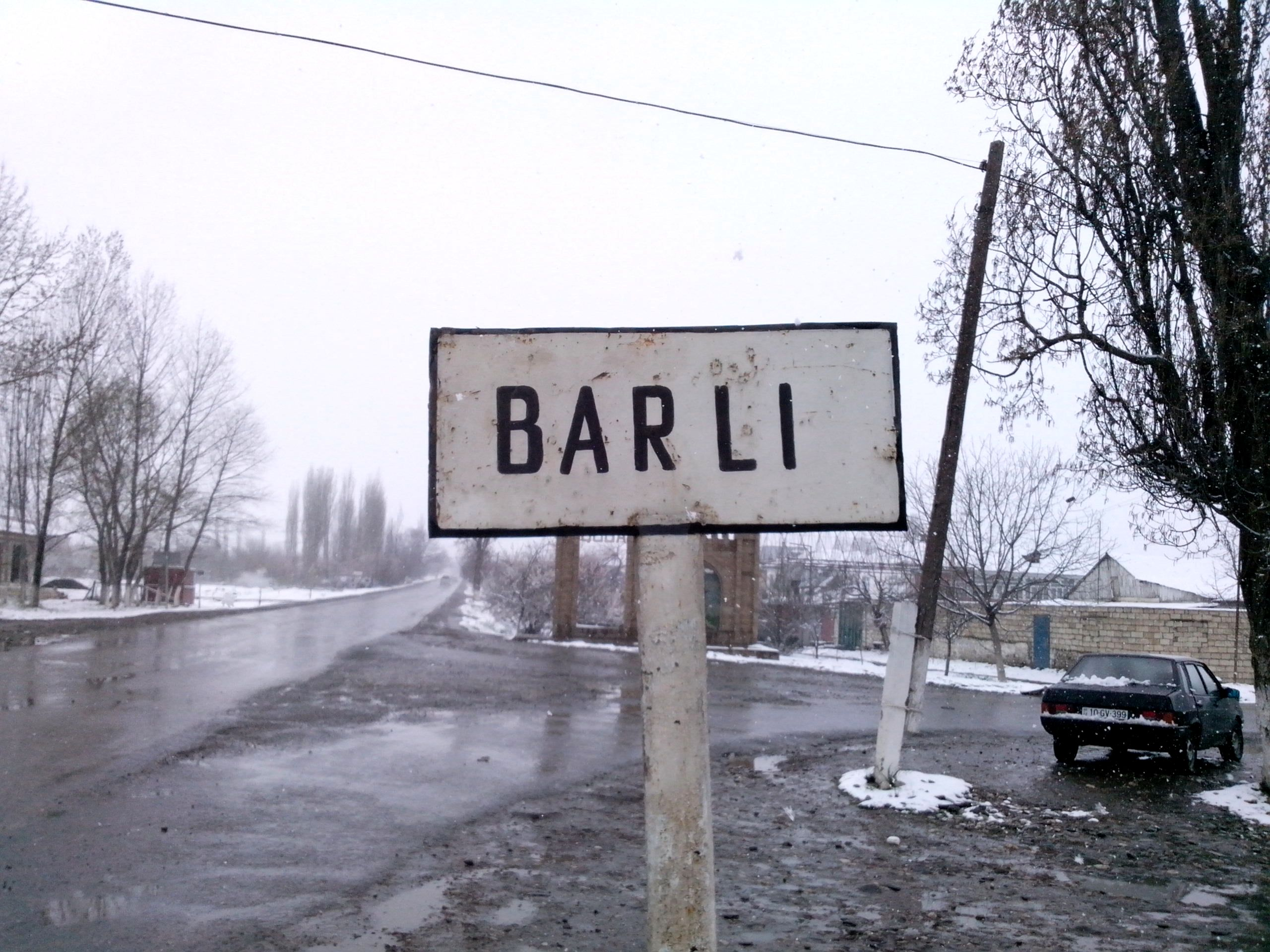

- Location within Azerbaijan
- Country: Azerbaijan
- Rayon: Quba

Population
  - Total: 1,585
- Time zone: UTC+4 (AZT)
  - Summer (DST): UTC+5 (AZT)

Barlı is a village and municipality in the Quba Rayon of Azerbaijan. It has a population of 1,585.
