= Zeit =

Zeit may refer to:

== Publications ==
- Die Zeit, German national weekly newspaper of record
  - Zeit Wissen, bi-monthly popular science magazine published by Die Zeit
- Theater der Zeit, German monthly magazine on theatre and politics
- Zeit im Bild, the national television news program of Austria

== Businesses and organizations ==
- ZEIT-Stiftung, charitable foundation named after Die Zeit
- Vercel, formerly known as Zeit.

== Film and television ==
- Zeit der Störche, a 1971 East German film
- Zeit der Wünsche, a 2005 German television film
- Zeit genug, a 1982 German television series
- Zeit zu leben, a 1969 East German film

== Music ==
- Zeit (Rammstein album), 2022
  - "Zeit" (song), its title song
- Zeit (Tangerine Dream album), 1972, and its title song
- "Zeit", song performed by Bianca Shomburg representing Germany in the Eurovision Song Contest 1997

== Other uses ==
- Die Zeit, die Zeit, 2012 novel by Martin Suter
- Zeit², 2011 video game by Ubisoft

== See also ==
- Andrey Zeits (born 1986), Kazakh cyclist
