= Qonaqkənd, Quba =

Qonaqkənd
- Municipality
- Location within Azerbaijan
- Coordinates: 41°04′17″N 48°36′32″E
- Country: Azerbaijan
- District: Quba

Population
  - Total: 1,668
- Time zone: UTC+4 (AZT)
  - Summer (DST): UTC+5 (AZT)

Qonaqkənd (Gonagkend; Tat: Qunaqkənd) is a village and municipality in the Quba District of Azerbaijan. It has a population of 1,688. The municipality consists of the villages of Qonaqkənd, Qarovulüstü, and Xaşı. Tats make up the majority of the population.
