= Bagbanlar, Ganja =

Baghbanlar
- Village
- Azerbaijani: Bağbanlar
- Location within Azerbaijan
- Coordinates: 40°39′N 46°19′E
- Country: Azerbaijan
- City: Ganja
- Time zone: UTC+4 (AZT)
  - Summer (DST): UTC+5 (AZT)

Bağbanlar (Baghbanlar) is a mahallah (district) in Ganja, Azerbaijan. Bagbanlar was constituted as an urban-type settlement in 1946. In 1963 the Bangbanlar urban-type settlement was merged into the city of Kirovabad (i.e. present-day Ganja).
