= Bağbanlar, Bilasuvar =

Baghbanlar
- Municipality
- Azerbaijani: Bağbanlar
- Location within Azerbaijan
- Coordinates: 39°29′41″N 48°33′45″E
- Country: Azerbaijan
- District: Bilasuvar

Population
  - Total: 3,739
- Time zone: UTC+4 (AZT)

Bağbanlar (Baghbanlar, known as Arxangelovka until 1991) is a village and municipality in the Bilasuvar District of Azerbaijan. It has a population of 3,739.
