= Laza, Qabala =

Laza
- Municipality
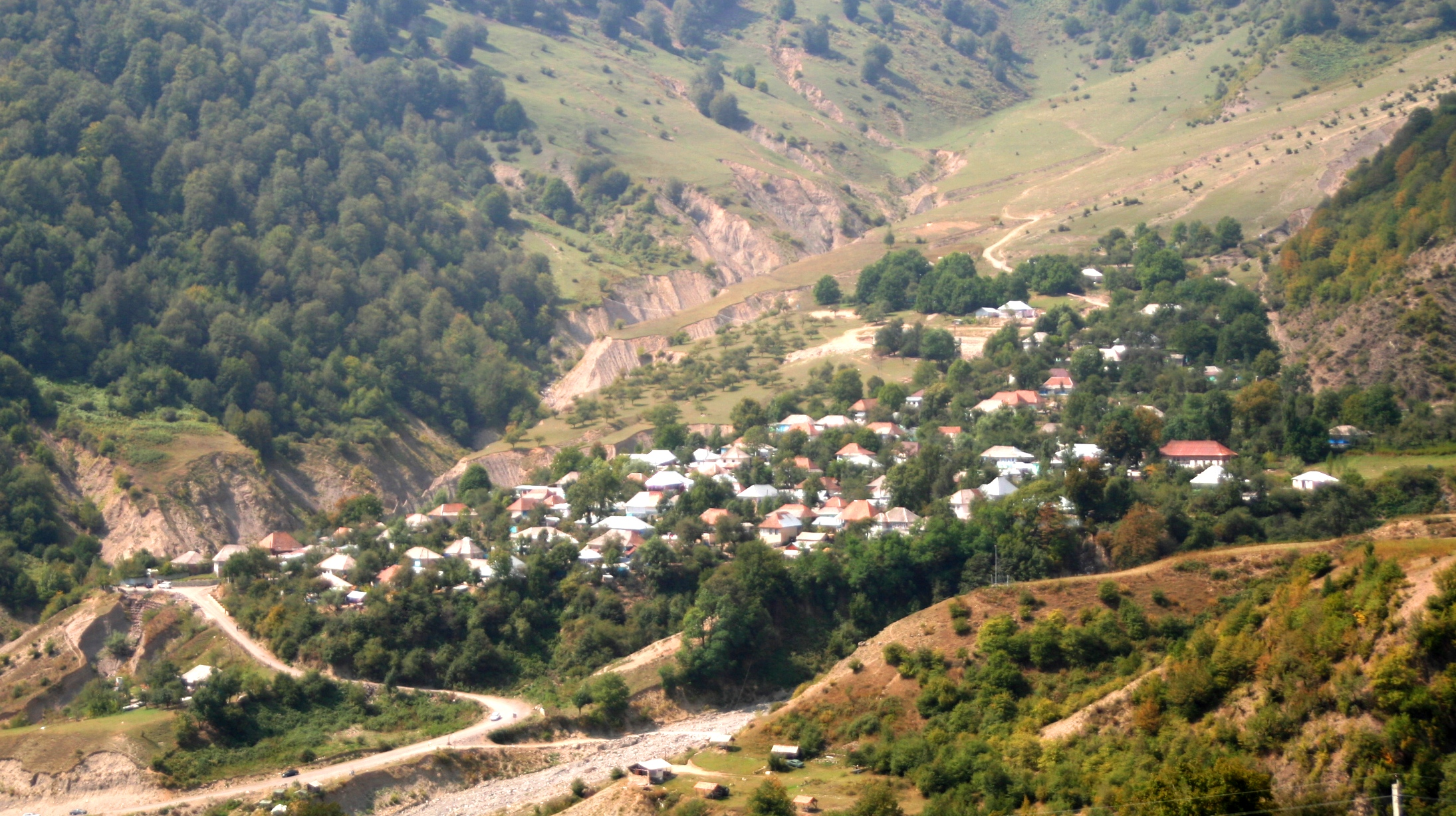

- Location within Azerbaijan Location within Shaki-Zagatala Economic Region
- Coordinates: 41°03′00″N 47°54′29″E
- Country: Azerbaijan
- Rayon: Qabala

Population
  - Total: 2,025
- Time zone: UTC+4 (AZT)
  - Summer (DST): UTC+5 (AZT)

Laza is a village and municipality in the Qabala Rayon of Azerbaijan. It has a population of 2,025. Ethnic Lezgins live in the village.

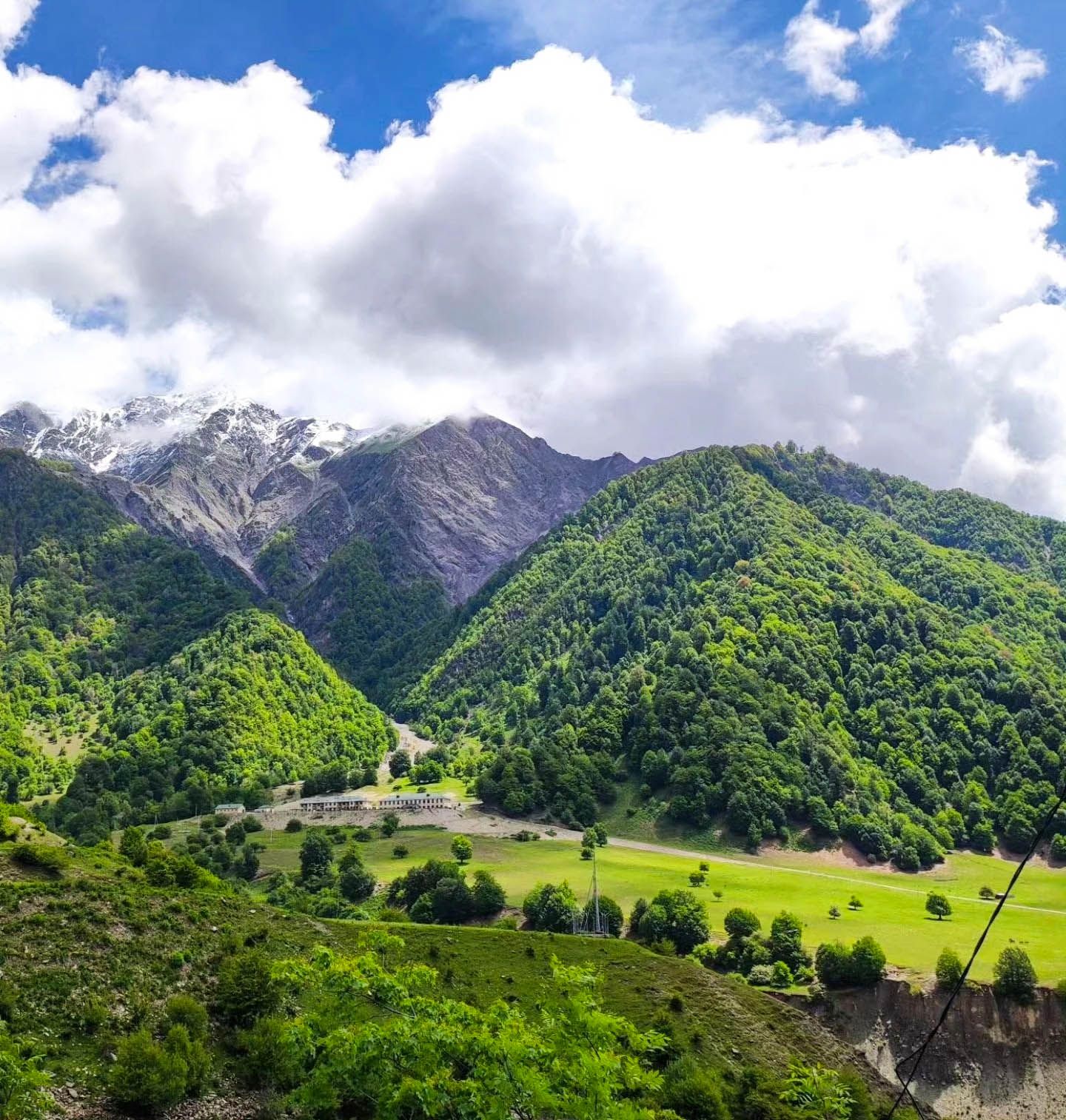
Laza Qəbələ.
