= Küsnət, Qabala =

Küsnət
- Location within Azerbaijan Location within Shaki-Zagatala Economic Region
- Coordinates: 41°01′25″N 47°54′10″E
- Country: Azerbaijan
- Rayon: Qabala
- Municipality: Qəbələ
- Time zone: UTC+4 (AZT)
  - Summer (DST): UTC+5 (AZT)

Küsnət is a village in the Qabala Rayon of Azerbaijan. The village forms part of the municipality of Qəbələ.
