= Quba District (Azerbaijan) =

District in northeastern Azerbaijan

Coordinates: 41°22′12″N 48°30′00″E

- District
- Map of Azerbaijan showing Quba District
- Country: Azerbaijan
- Region: Guba-Khachmaz
- Established: 8 August 1930
- Capital: Quba
- Settlements: 157

Government
  - Governor: İlqar Mahmudov

Area
  - Total: 2,610 km^{2} (1,010 sq mi)
  - Rank: 1th

Population (2020)
  - Total: 173,400
  - Density: 66.4/km^{2} (172/sq mi)
- Time zone: UTC+4 (AZT)
- Postal code: 4000
- Website: www.quba-ih.gov.az

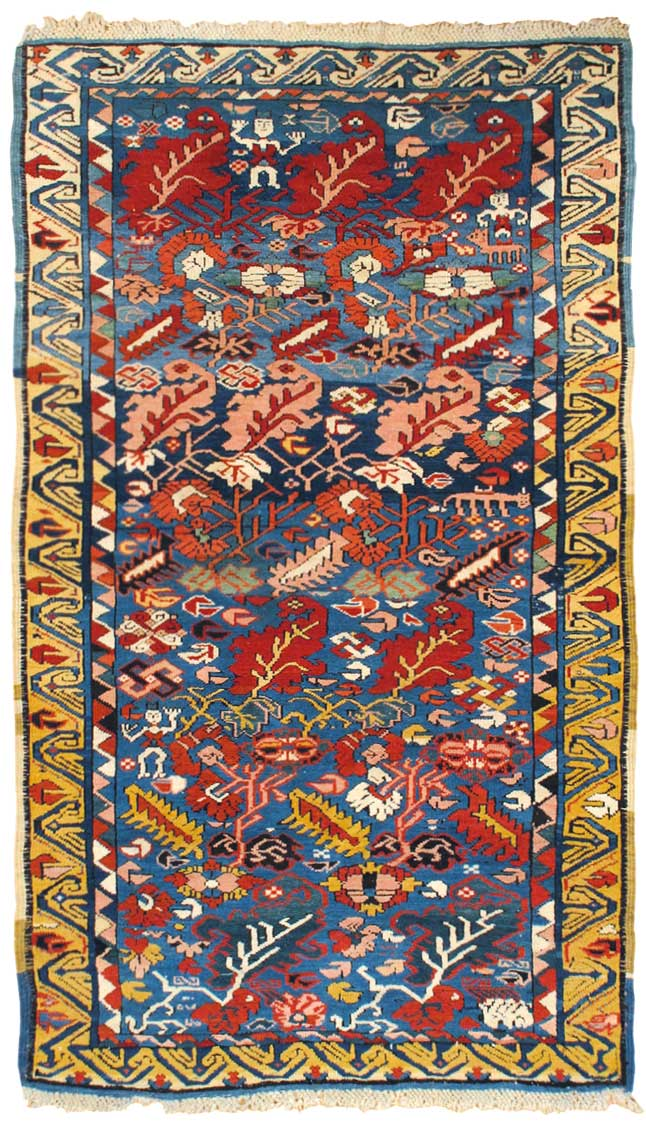
Zeikhur Caucasian rug from Quba District, made circa 1870

Quba District (Azerbaijani: Quba rayonu, lit. 'Guba District'; Azerbaijani: Quba rayonu) is one of the 66 districts of Azerbaijan. Its position in the northeastern part of the country puts it within the borders of Europe. It shares borders with the districts of Qusar, Qabala, Ismayilli, Shamakhi, Shabran, and Khachmaz. Quba belongs to the Guba-Khachmaz Economic Region. Its capital and largest city is Quba. As of 2020, the district had a population of 173,400.

The fertile region surrounding Quba is best known for its production of apples and the city area of Quba is known for its fine carpets.

== History ==
Quba rose to prominence in the 18th century. In 1747, Nader Shah ruler of the Afsharid Dynasty was assassinated. That same year, Hussein-Ali, the Shah's designated ruler of the region, decided to attempt to unify the Azeri khanates as an independent kingdom. One of his first moves was to relocate his capital from the less defensible Xudat in the Caspian lowlands to Quba, where he built a fortress. Hussein-Ali died in 1757, and his son Fatali Khan carried on the expansion, with Quba reaping the riches of its status as the capital. Some ruins from this period, such as Çirax Qala on the way to Baku, exist today.

However, upon Fatali Khan's death in 1789, the city's fortunes began to turn. In 1806, the khanate was occupied and soon absorbed by the Russian Empire. As a result, the city fell into the background of Azerbaijani history and politics.

The city is home to several historic buildings, including the Juma Mosque (Cuma Məscid or Friday Mosque), Ardabil Mosque (Ərdəbil Məscid) and old hamman (baths).

The region is home to Azerbaijan's largest community of Mountain Jews in the community of Qırmızı Qəsəbə (formerly in Russian: Krasnaya Sloboda, English: Red Town), located just across the river from Quba City.

== Agriculture of Quba ==
The Guba region has been known for its fruitful gardens since the Soviet era. According to the annual report of the Azerbaijan Statistical Committee, the apple orchards in the Guba-Khachmaz economic region cover nearly 22,000 hectares. About 14,000 hectares of these are in the Guba district.

=== Apple festival ===
Since 2012, every year an apple festival is held in Guba. Compositions, national dances reflecting Azerbaijani customs and traditions, different types of apples, sweets and drinks prepared from apple are demonstrated at the ceremony. Various competitions are held among the gardeners at the "Apple Festival".

== Historical and architectural monuments ==
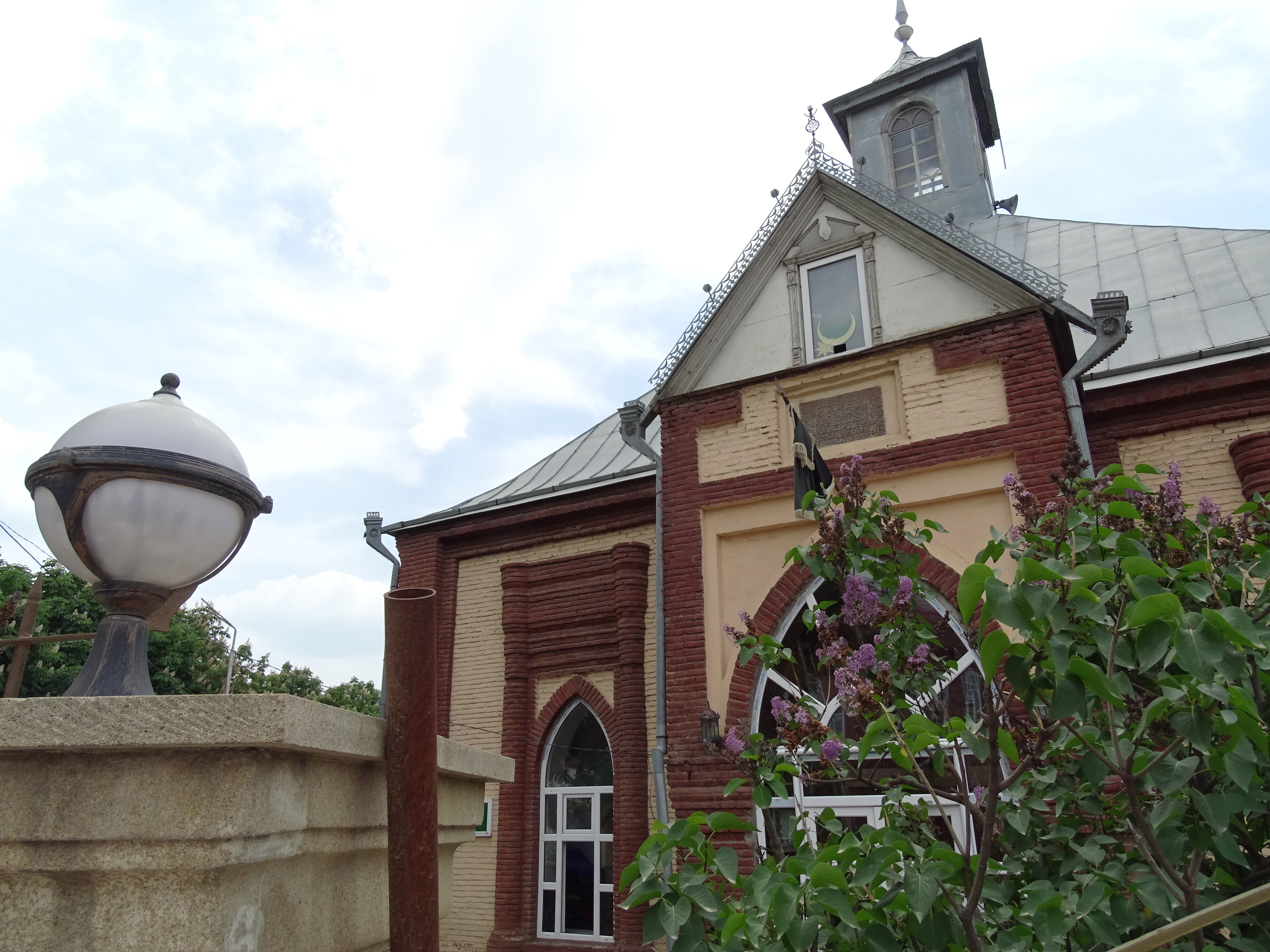
Sakina Khanum Mosque

There are 134 historical and archaeological monuments in the Quba district. These include the temple of fire worshipers near the village of Khinalig, the Mausoleums of Aghbil dating back to the 16th century, the Sakina Khanum mosque, the Juma mosque, Ardabil mosque, which dates back to the 19th century.

== Demographics ==
Ethnic groups in Quba (2019)
1. Azerbaijanis (75.3%)
2. Tats (14.2%)
3. Lezgins (4.67%)
4. Khinalugs (2.09%)
5. Jews (1.60%)
6. Others (2.14%)

Azerbaijanis (All parts of district) - 79.22%, Tats (Southern parts) - 9.10% and Lezgians (Northwestern parts) - 5.87 % are the largest ethnic groups of Quba District. Khinalugs (1.43%) are living in the village of Khinalug. Buduq (Budukh).

| Ethnic group | 27 January-3 February 1999 Census | | 13-22 April 2009 Census | |
| Ethnic group | Population | % | Population | % |
|---|---|---|---|---|
| Total | 136 845 | 100.00 | 152 452 | 100.00 |
| Azerbaijanis | 120 502 | 88.06 | 98 774 | 62.22 |
| Khinalug | 120 502 | 88.06 | 2 177 | 1.43 |
| Qriz | 120 502 | 88.06 | 778 | 0.51 |
| Tat People | 1 088 | 0.80 | 13 880 | 9,1 |
| Lezgins | 9 312 | 6.80 | 8 952 | 5.87 |
| Jews | 2 819 | 2.06 | 2 705 | 1.77 |
| Turkish people | 2 615 | 1.91 | 2 159 | 1.42 |
| Russians | 321 | 0.23 | 135 | 0.09 |
| Tatars | 85 | 0.06 | 63 | 0.04 |
| Ukrainians | 32 | 0.02 | 13 | 0.01 |
| Talysh people | | | 10 | |
| Georgians | 14 | 0.01 | 5 | 0.00 |
| Armenians | 7 | 0.01 | | |
| Others | 50 | 0.04 | 801 | 0.53 |

=== Languages ===
- Azeri (mother tongue of 86% of the population)
- Lezgi
- Tati (Judeo-Tat)
- Khinalug
- Buduq

== Population ==
According to the Statistical Committee of the Republic, the total number of the population was 137,8 thousand in 2000. This figure increased by approximately 32.2 thousand and reached 170 thousand In 2018.

Population of region (at the beginning of the year, thsd. persons)
| Region | 2000 | 2001 | 2002 | 2003 | 2004 | 2005 | 2006 | 2007 | 2008 | 2009 | 2010 | 2011 | 2012 | 2013 | 2014 | 2015 | 2016 | 2017 | 2018 | 2019 | 2020 | 2021 |
| Guba region | 137,8 | 139,1 | 140,0 | 141,0 | 142,0 | 143,8 | 146,1 | 148,6 | 150,7 | 152,0 | 153,6 | 155,6 | 157,6 | 159,3 | 161,4 | 163,9 | 166,2 | 168,4 | 170,0 | 171,7 | 173,4 | 174,7 |
| urban population | 26,9 | 27,0 | 27,1 | 27,2 | 31,5 | 31,8 | 32,2 | 32,3 | 37,7 | 37,9 | 38,1 | 38,4 | 38,7 | 38,8 | 39,0 | 39,4 | 39,8 | 40,2 | 40,4 | 40,6 | 41,0 | 41,2 |
| rural population | 110,9 | 112,1 | 112,9 | 113,8 | 110,5 | 112,0 | 113,9 | 116,3 | 113,0 | 114,1 | 115,5 | 117,2 | 118,9 | 120,5 | 122,4 | 124,5 | 126,4 | 128,2 | 129,6 | 131,1 | 132,4 | 133,5 |

== General information ==
| General information | |
|---|---|
| Total territory, [km^{2}] | 2,610.00 |
| Total number of population | 143,100 |
| Number of villages | 155 |
| Number of settlements | 2 |
| Number of hospitals and medical enterprises | 16 |
| Number of culture centers | 194 |

== Healthcare ==
There are Central Hospital, Regional Perinatal Center, the Regional Diagnostic Center of Guba, rehabilitation centers, the Center of Hygiene and Epidemiology, Guba Branch of the Scientific Research Institute of Hematology and Transfusiology named after B. Eyvazov, 91 medical stations.

== Names of large settlements ==
| Cities and big settlements | Typies | Population (2009 Census) |
|---|---|---|
| Quba | city | 23652 |
| Zərdabi | municipality and village | 4002 |
| Qırmızı Qəsəbə | settlement | 3252 |
| Barlı | municipality and village | 1715 |
| Bağbanlı | municipality and village | 1648 |
| Qaraçay | municipality and village | 1642 |
| Qonaqkənd | municipality and village | 1615 |

== Education ==
There are 155 educational institutions, 135 secondary schools, 15 preschools, and 5 kindergartens in the district. There is also a branch of the Azerbaijan State Pedagogical University, Guba Social-Economic College, Medical College, Vocational High School, Private Vocational School.

== Notable natives ==
- Abbasgulu Bakikhanov (also spelt Bakixanov or Bakikhanli), a 19th-century writer, historian, and philosopher, who lived in the village of Amsar located in 6 km far from Quba city. His museum is located in Quba city.
- Sakina Akhundzadeh, playwright, was born here in 1865

== Gallery ==
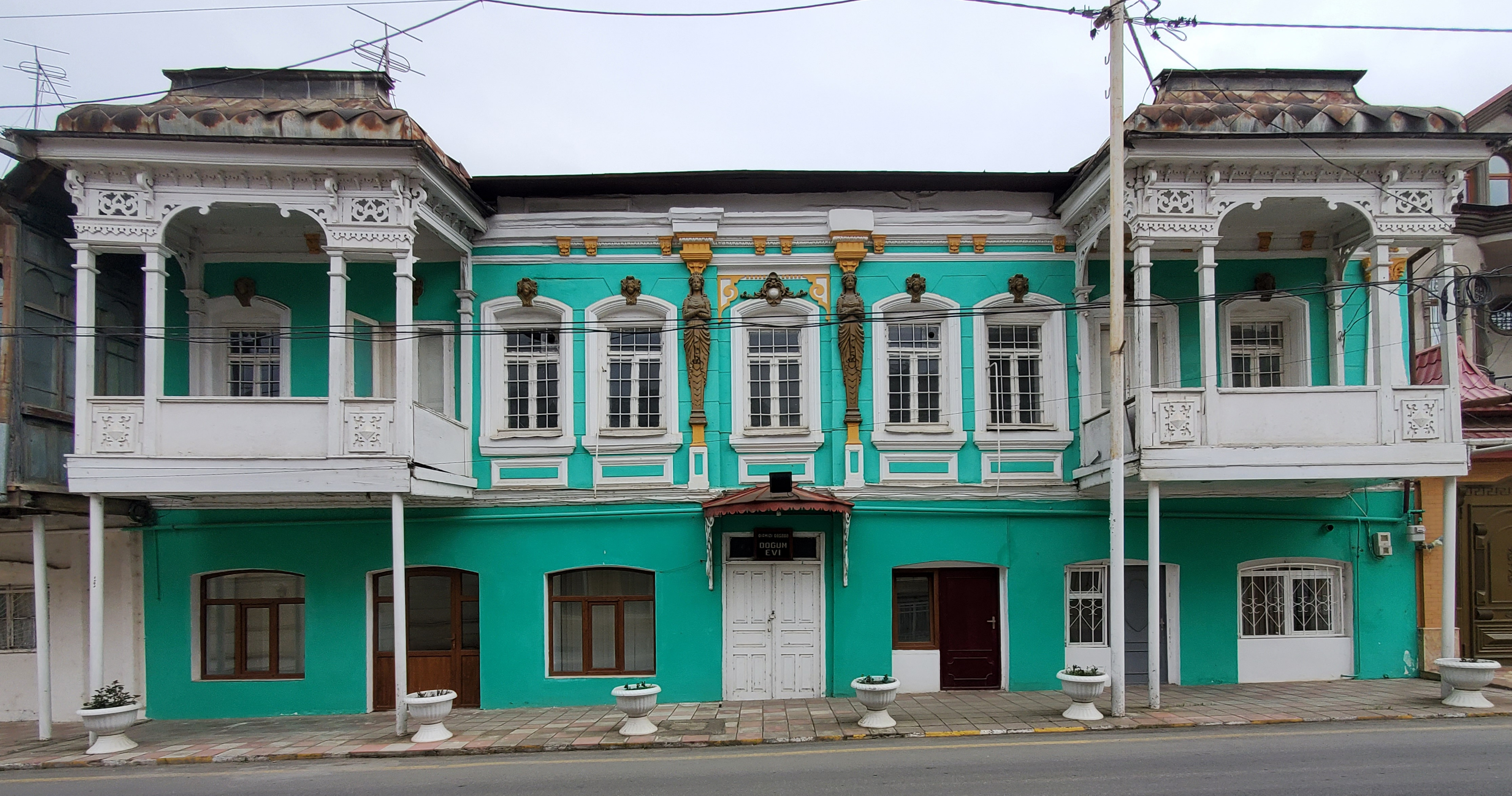
Building in Quba city

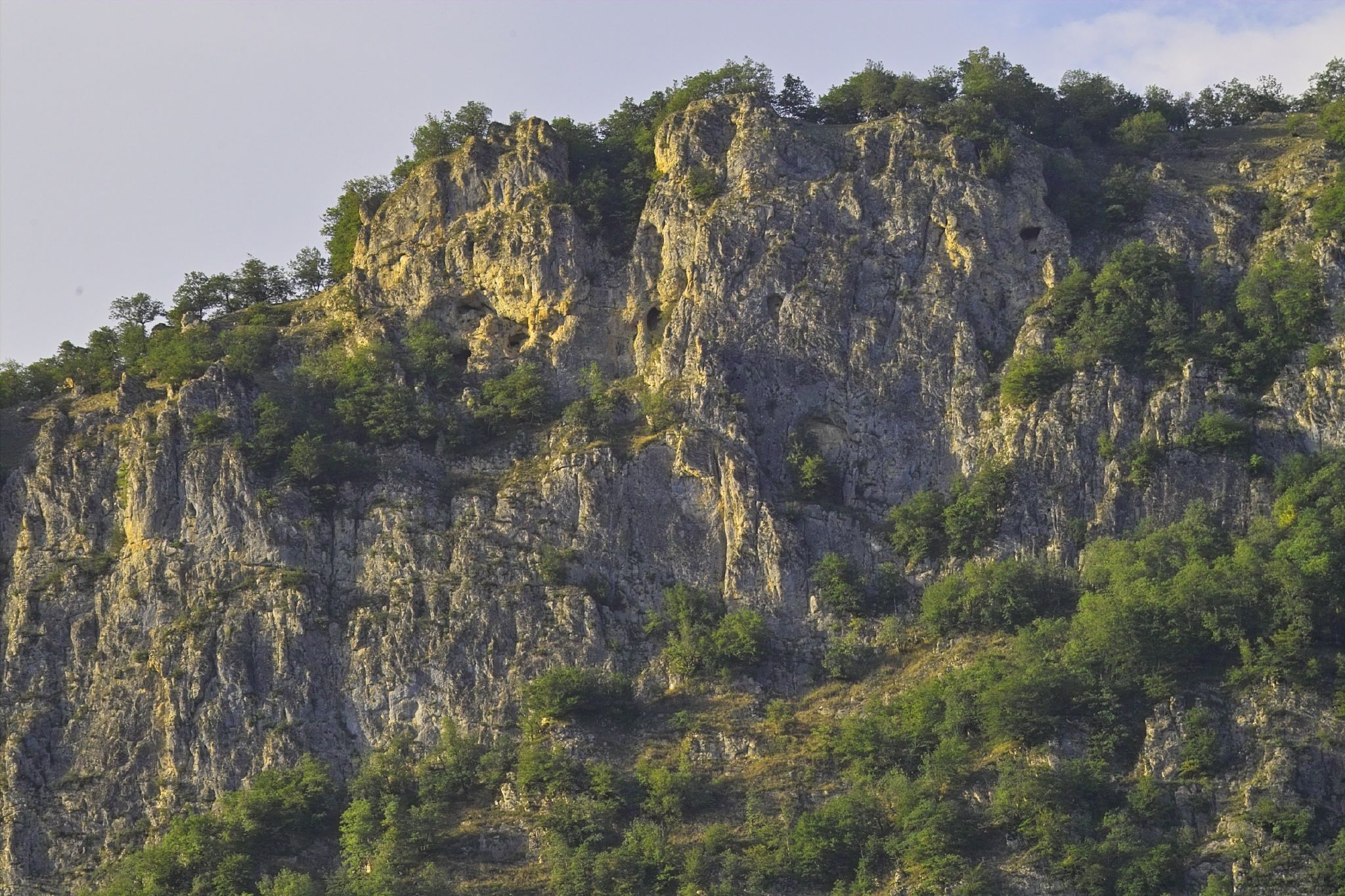
Cliffs above Afurca

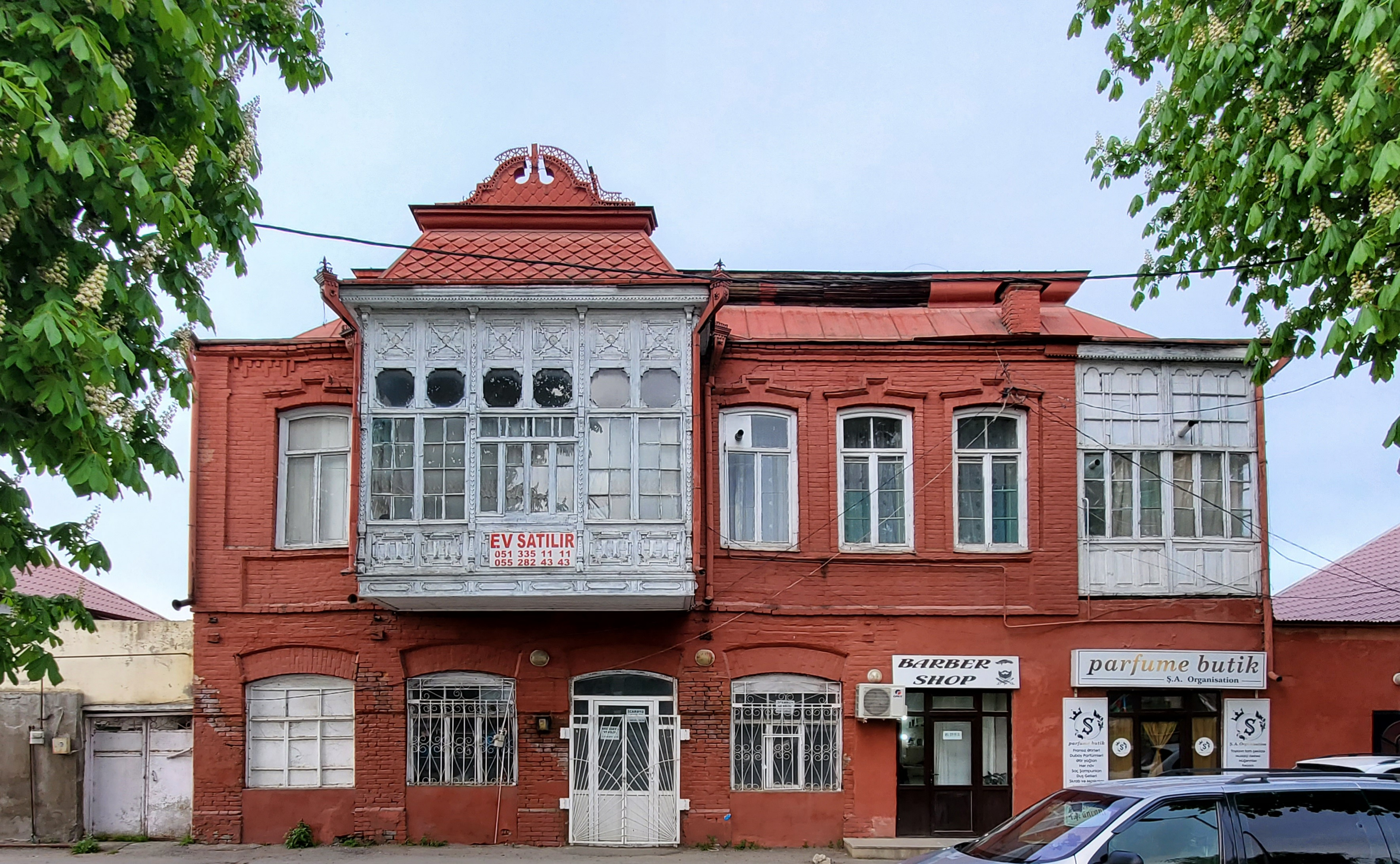
Building in Quba city

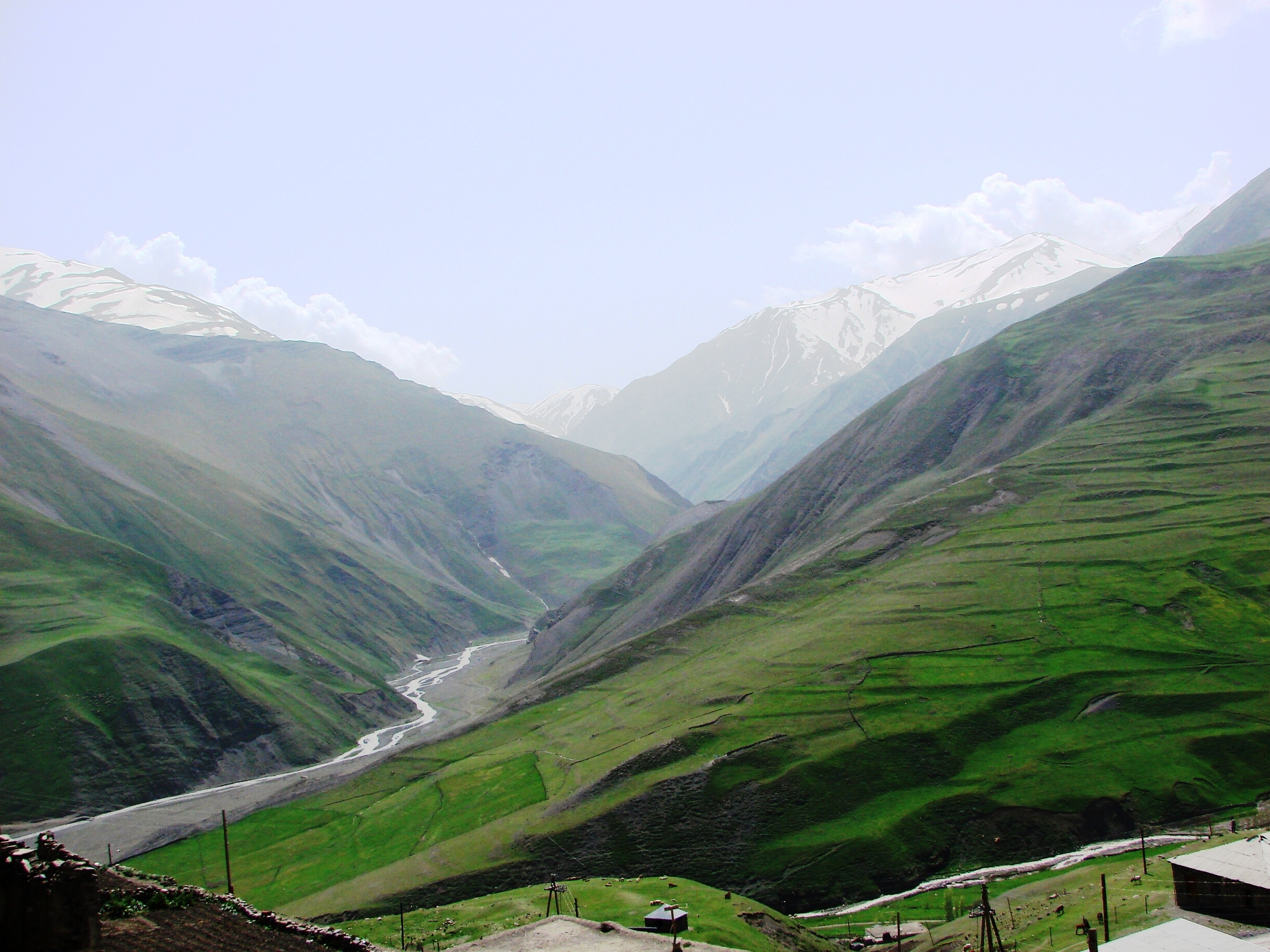
Mountains in Khinalug

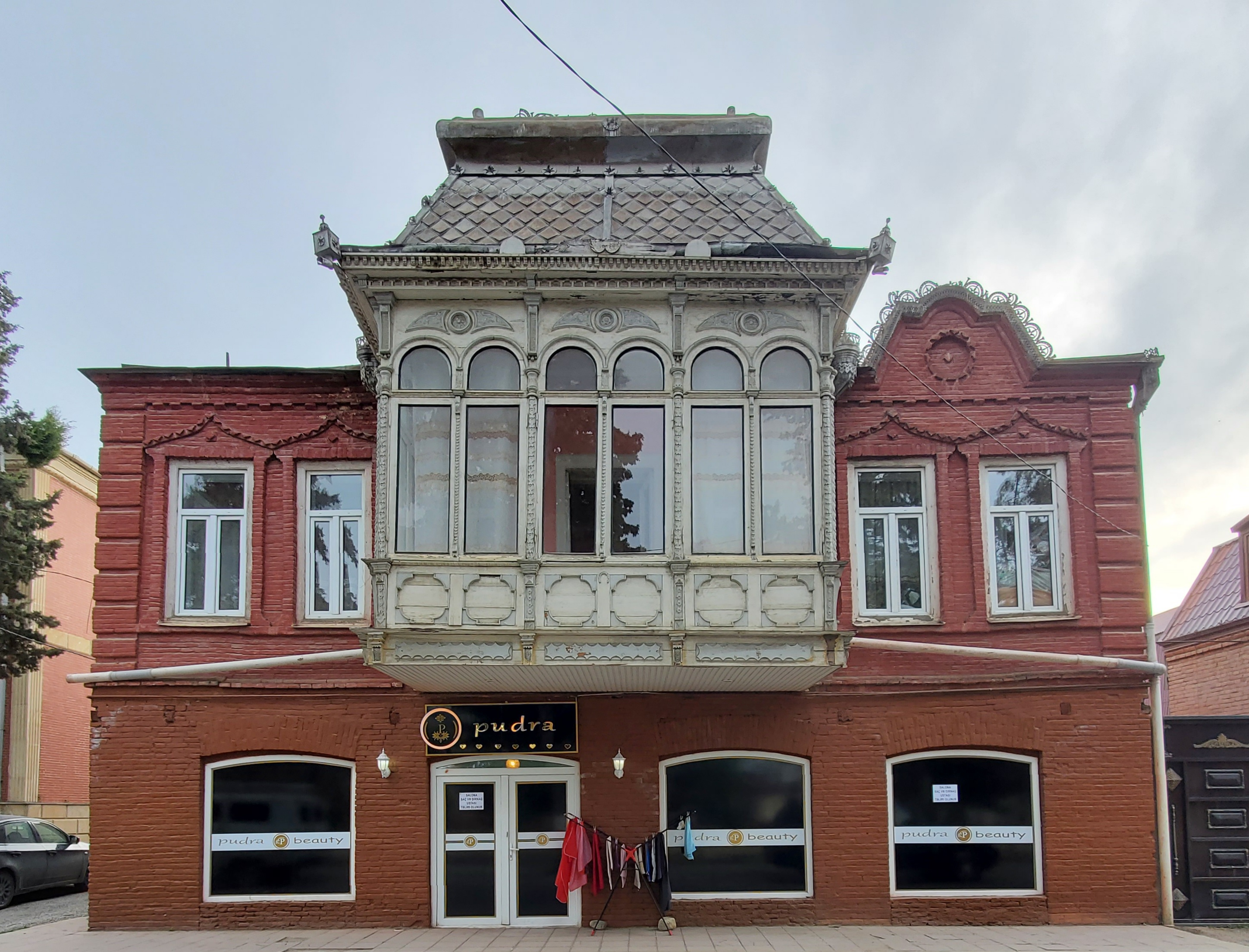
Building in Quba city

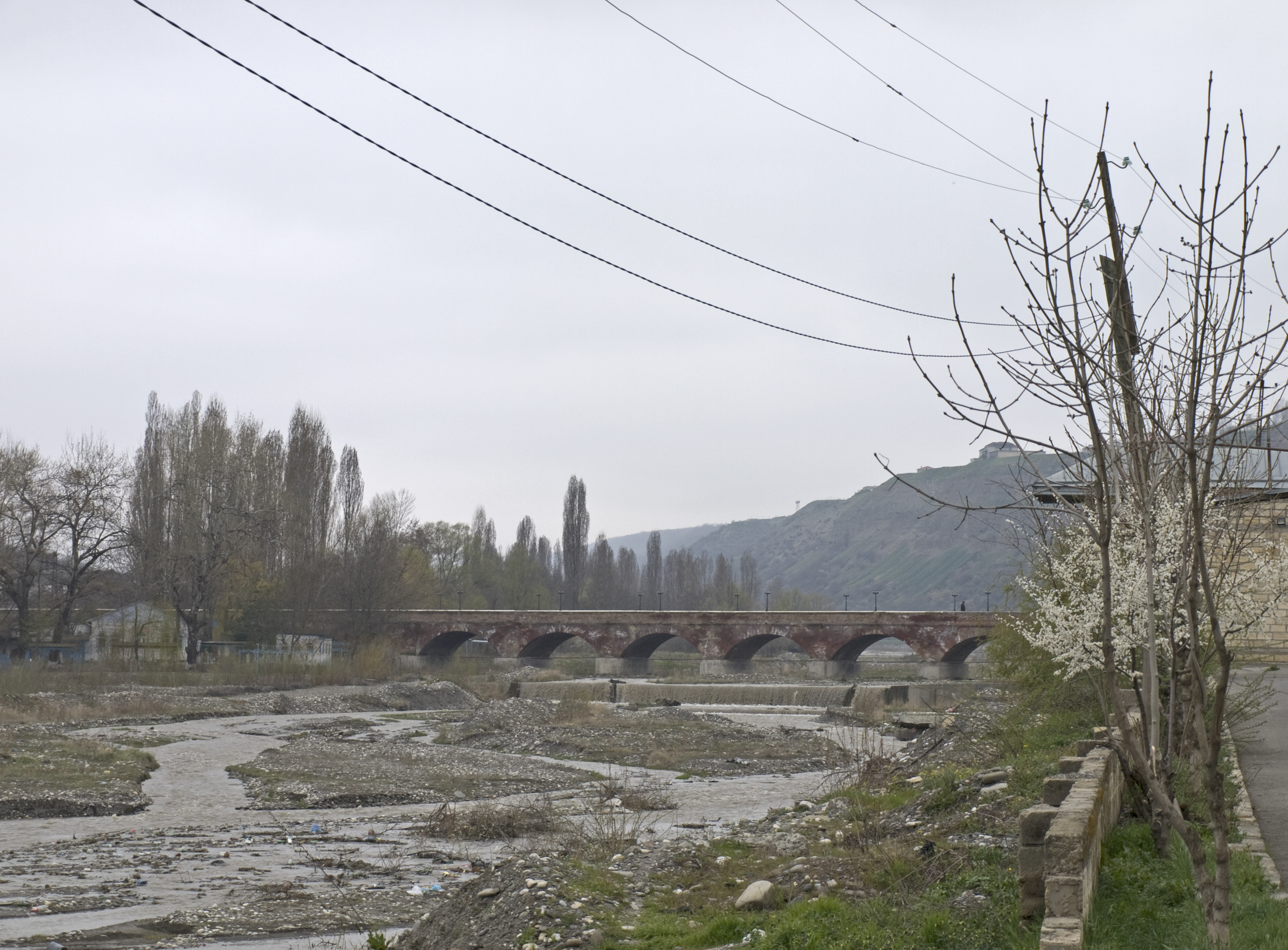
The arch bridge over the Qudyal river connecting Quba (left) and Qırmızı Qəsəbə (right)

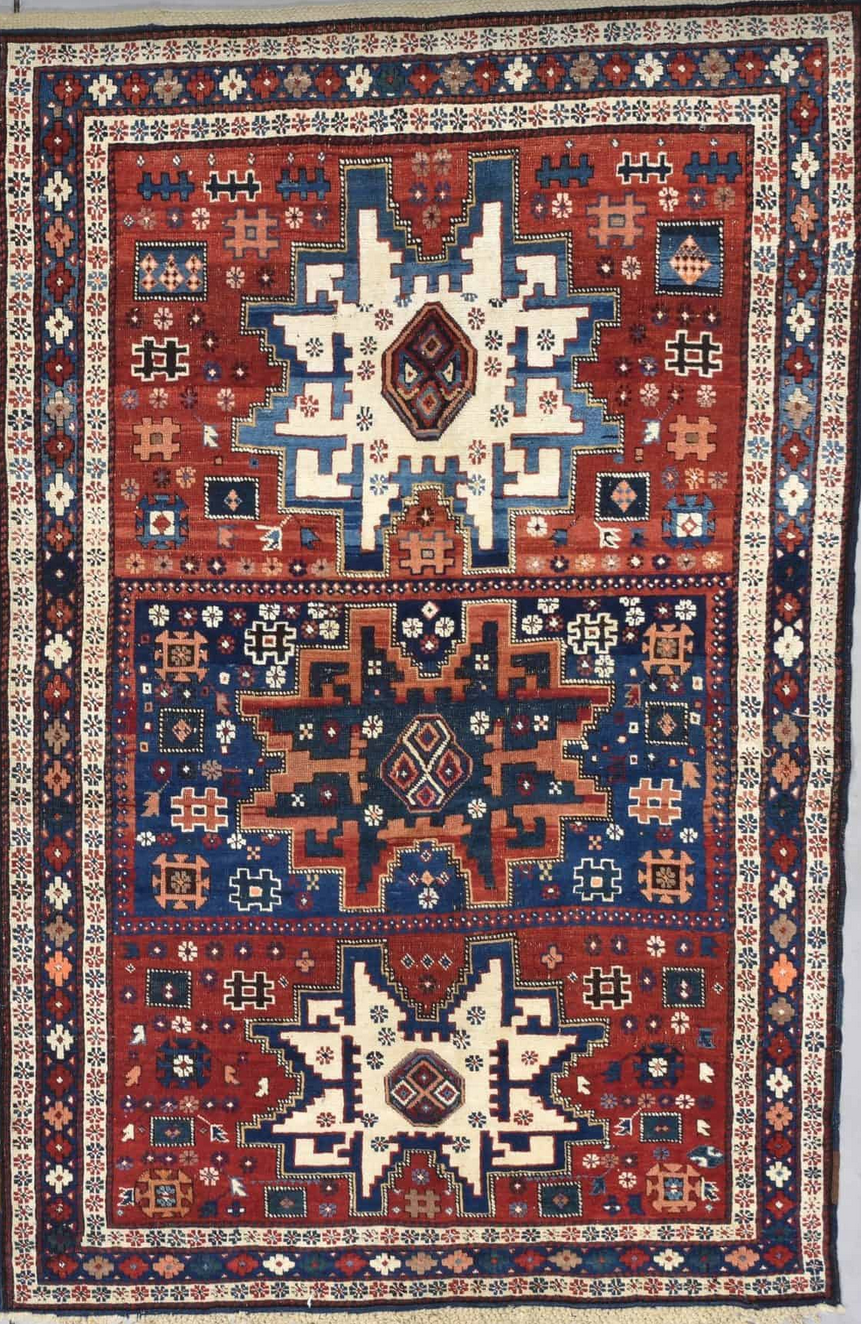
Kuba rug ca. 1875
