= Djelal ed-Din Korkmasov =

Dagestani revolutionary and Soviet politician (1877–1937)

- Qorqmas Celaletdin; Къоркъмас Желалетдин; Джелал-эд-Дин Коркмасов
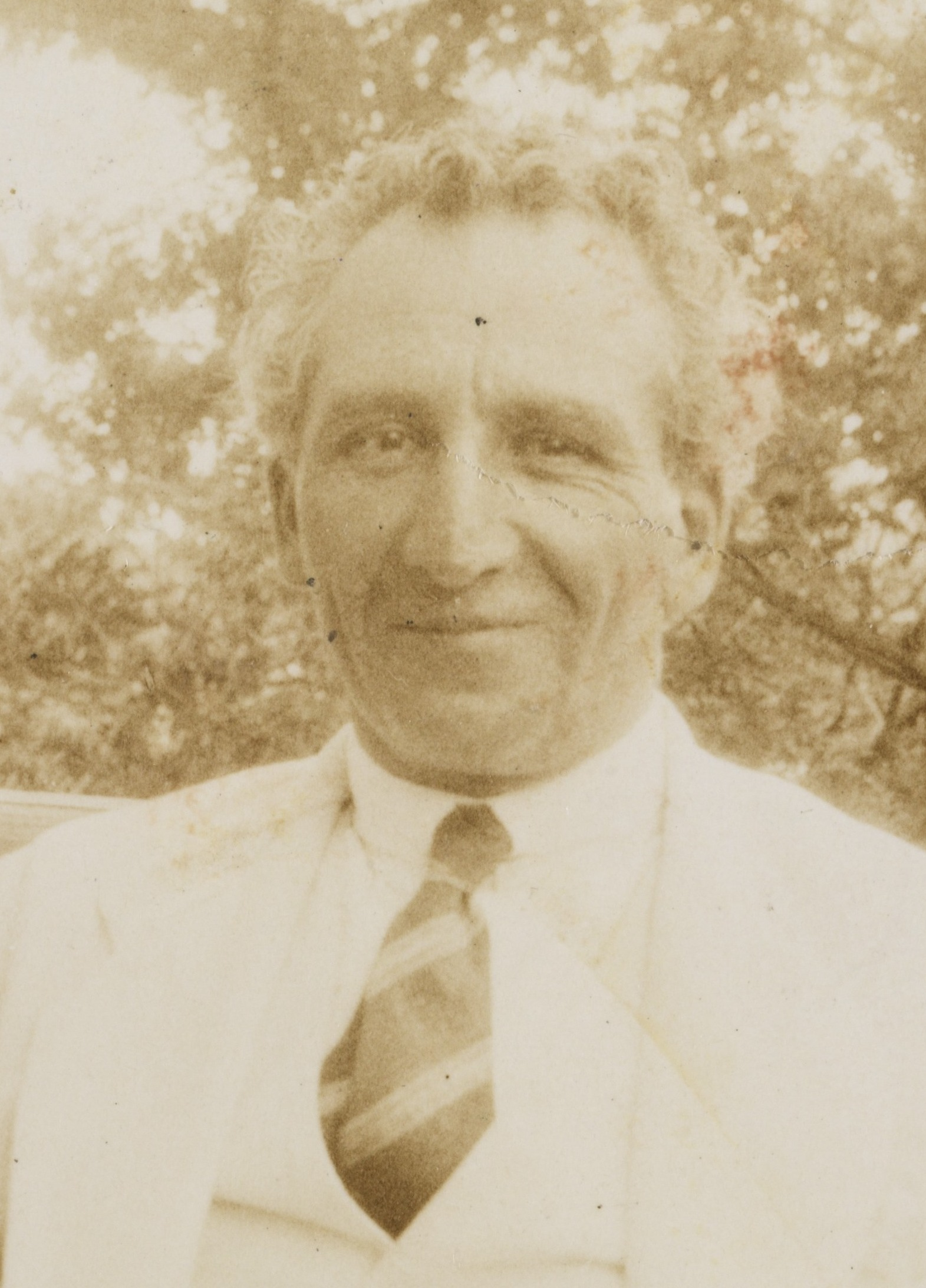
- Korkmasov photographed by Fridtjof Nansen, 1925

Chairman of the Council of People's Commissars of the Dagestan Autonomous Soviet Socialist Republic
- In office 5 December 1921 – 29 December 1931
- Preceded by: Position established
- Succeeded by: Karim Mammadbeyov

Chairman of the Dagestan Regional Committee of the Russian Communist Party (Bolshevik)
- Acting
- In office 11 April 1920 – 26 November 1920
- Preceded by: Position re-established (Note: Position previously held by Ullu-biy Buynaksky. Preceded as leader of Dagestan by Uzun-Hajji as Emir of the North Caucasus and Sultan-Said Kazbekov as chairman of the Security Council of the Northern Caucasus and Dagestan.)
- Succeeded by: Boris Sheboldayev

Chairman of the Dagestan Regional Executive Committee of the Mountainous Republic of the Northern Caucasus
- In office 5 August 1917 – April 1918
- Commissar: Basiyat Shakhanov
- Preceded by: Ibrahim Gaydarov
- Succeeded by: Position abolished (Note: Succeeded by Ullu-biy Buynaksky as Chairman of the Dagestan Regional Committee of the Russian Communist Party (Bolshevik).)

Personal details
- Born: 1 October 1877 Kumtorkala, Dagestan Oblast, Caucasus Viceroyalty (now Republic of Dagestan, Russia)
- Died: 27 September 1937 (aged 59) Moscow, Russian SFSR, Soviet Union (now Russia)
- Cause of death: Execution by firing squad
- Party: All-Union Communist Party (Bolshevik) (from 1919)
- Other political affiliations: Dagestan Socialist Group (1917–1919); Young Turks; Russian Social Democratic Labour Party (1905–1918)
- Education: University of Paris; École pratique des hautes études; Russian Higher School of Social Sciences

Military service
- Allegiance: (Russian Soviet Federative Socialist Republic) Russian SFSR; Security Council of the Northern Caucasus and Dagestan
- Battles/wars: Russian Civil War; Second Battle of Port-Petrovsk; World War I; Dagestan Campaign (1918) (POW); Russian Civil War; Battle of the North Caucasus (1918–1919); 1919–1920 North Caucasus uprising
- Central institution membership: 1931–1937: Member, All-Russian Central Executive Committee; 1936–1937: Deputy Secretary, Soviet of Nationalities

Djelal ed-Din Aselder oğlu Korkmasov (Note: Kumyk: Къоркъмас Желалетдин Аселдерни уланы, romanized: Qorqmas Celaletdin Aselderni ulanı; Russian: Джелал-эд-Дин Асельдерович Коркмасов, romanized: Dzhelal-ed-Din Aselderovich Korkmasov) (1 October [O.S. 19 September] 1877 – 27 September 1937) was a Dagestani revolutionary and Soviet politician who served as Chairman of the Dagestan Regional Committee of the Russian Communist Party (Bolshevik) in 1920 and as Chairman of the Council of People's Commissars of the Dagestan Autonomous Soviet Socialist Republic from 1921 to 1931. Despite originally being a Menshevik or anarchist, he led the Bolsheviks to victory over various anti-communist groups in the Russian Civil War, and he is sometimes described as the founder of Dagestan.

Born into a family of Kumyk nobility, Korkmasov was the first Dagestani to study at the University of Paris, and he was a leader of anti-government protests by peasants during the Russian Revolution of 1905. In exile, he supported the Young Turks before returning to Russia in May 1917, amidst the Russian Revolution. He led the Dagestan Socialist Group, a non-Bolshevik left-wing party within the Mountainous Republic of the Northern Caucasus, and led the party to a landslide victory in the August 1917 regional election. He was a political rival to Najmuddin of Gotzo and the Dagestan National Committee, and following the First Battle of Port-Petrovsk he joined the Bolsheviks, quickly becoming their leader in Dagestan. Taken prisoner by forces under the control of the Ottoman Empire and warlord Lazar Bicherakhov in late September 1918, later leaving prison and joining an anti-White Russian insurgency that led to him becoming leader of the Dagestan Autonomous Soviet Socialist Republic.

As leader of Dagestan Korkmasov invested heavily in agricultural improvement and development, taking inspiration from Benito Mussolini's drainage of Italian marshes. He was also involved in Turkic affairs, helping to draft the Yañalif Latin-script Turkic alphabet and negotiating and signing the 1921 Treaty of Moscow between Russia and Turkey. He was appointed to the Central Executive Committee of the Soviet Union in 1931 before later being executed during the Great Purge.

== Early life and career ==
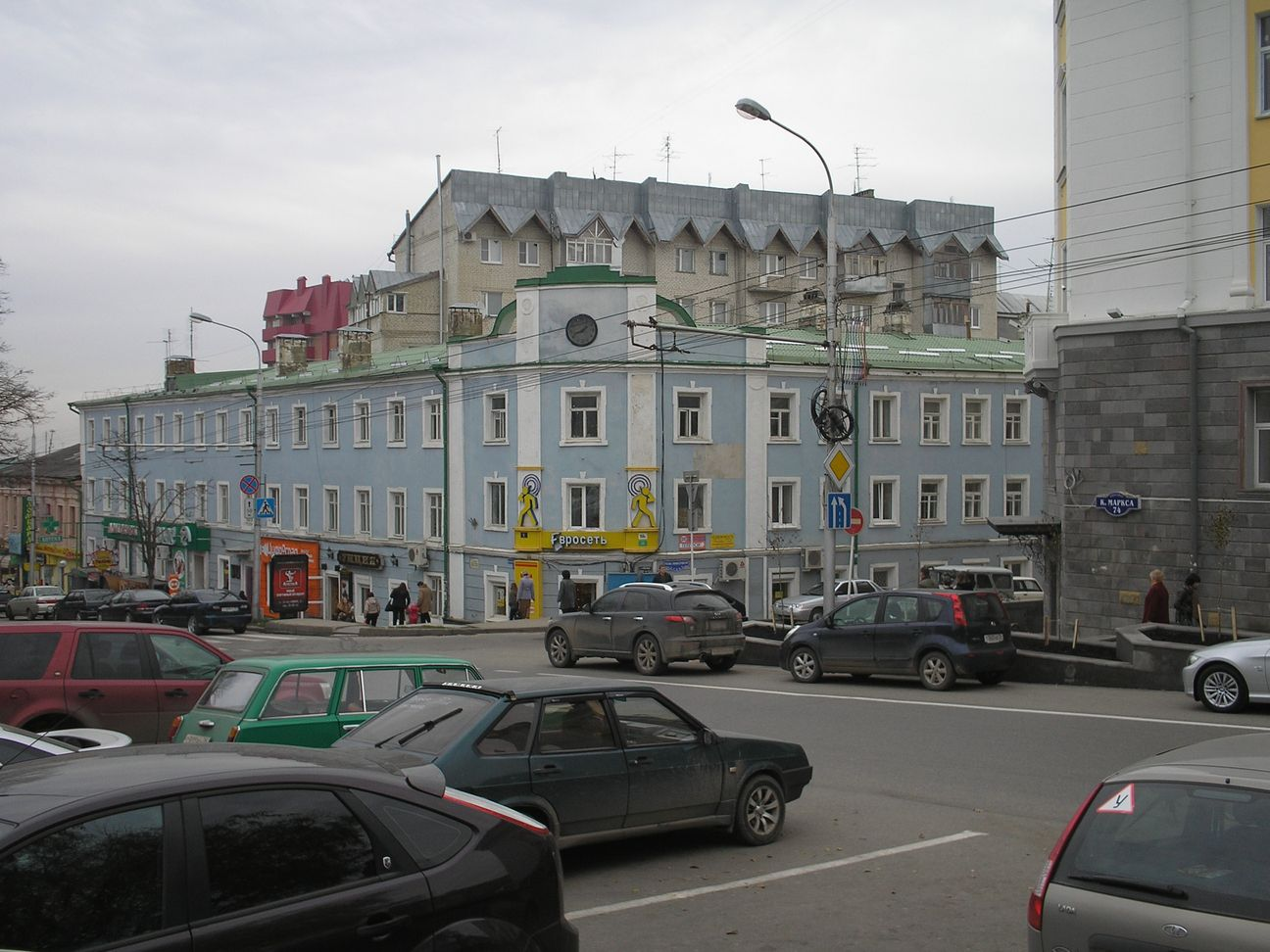
The Stavropol Classical Boys' Gymnasium, where Korkmasov studied and graduated with honours

Djelal ed-Din Aselder oğlu Korkmasov was born on 1 October 1877 in the village of Kumtorkala, in the Dagestan Oblast of the Russian Empire to a family of Kumyk nobles (uzden). His maternal grandfather had been a murid to anti-colonial uprising leader Imam Shamil, while his paternal grandfather fought under Shamil's Caucasian Imamate, being sent into internal exile and executed after the failure of the uprising. His father, Aselder-Hajji, was an officer in His Imperial Majesty's Own Escort and an employee of the colonial bureaucracy in Dagestan Oblast. He later left the bureaucracy due to his opposition to Russian rule and became a housekeeper.

Korkmasov studied at the Stavropol Classical Boys' Gymnasium, graduating with honours. While studying, he began writing, sending some completed works to a literary magazine for students and literary critic Nikolay Mikhaylovsky. Korkmasov began studying at the natural sciences faculty of Imperial Moscow University, but left after a year to enter the University of Paris, where he also studied at the natural sciences faculty. Korkmasov was the first individual from Dagestan to study at the University of Paris. He also graduated from the École pratique des hautes études and the Russian Higher School of Social Sciences, a Paris-based university founded by Russian Maksim Kovalevsky. From 1903 to 1906, Korkmasov was a lawyer in the capital of Dagestan, Temir-Khan-Shura (now Buynaksk).

== 1905 Revolution, arrest and exile ==
Korkmasov participated in the Russian Revolution of 1905 as it spread to the North Caucasus, joining the Temir-Khan-Shura branch of the Russian Social Democratic Labour Party. He was locally regarded as the leader of Dagestan's landless peasants, despite his status as an uzden and member of the intelligentsia. Korkmasov was also the leader of the Temir-Khan-Shura branch of the All-Russian Peasant Union, and advocated for the expropriation of landlords' properties, refusing to pay taxes, militarisation of the peasantry and the establishment of zemstvos in Dagestan. (Note: Dagestan, as a colony, was not permitted to have zemstvos as in metropolitan Russia.) During the revolution, Korkmasov met other radical intellectuals, such as Mahach Dahadayev, with whom he would later collaborate.

The extent to which Korkmasov's activities with the Bolsheviks, a branch of the RSDLP, has been disputed. Researcher M. A. Abdullayev has claimed that the Temir-Khan-Shura branch of the Peasant Union was responsible for establishing the Bolsheviks among the highlander peasantry in the North Caucasus. Z. G. Kharisova, by contrast, has argued that it is unlikely that Korkmasov was closely connected to the Bolsheviks during the Revolution of 1905, citing the significant presence of Mensheviks and anarchists in the Temir-Khan-Shura Peasant Union and the fact that the Bolsheviks were primarily focused on the cooping, machining, and railway industries. She has additionally stated that Korkmasov in particular was especially close to the Mensheviks. Other sources, particularly those written during the Soviet era (both in official Soviet historiography and among White émigrés), have described him as an anarchist.

Between June and July 1906, Korkmasov was arrested on three separate occasions. On 20 August of that year he was sentenced by the Ministry of Internal Affairs' Special Department to internal exile in the town of Lodeynoye Pole in the northwestern Olonets Governorate. In early 1907, at his own request, he was deported from Russia to France, where he returned to the University of Paris. He studied at the university's faculty of law, and became a member of the Young Turks movement supporting the Committee of Union and Progress in the Ottoman Empire. After moving to the Ottoman Empire, he founded a Russian-language pro-Young Turk newspaper, known as Constantinople News (Russian: Стамбульские новости, romanized: Stambulskiye novosti). The newspaper had a distribution of 1,000 copies. During his time in exile, Korkmasov was close to Mustafa Subhi, an Ottoman communist who would later establish the Communist Party of Turkey.

== Revolution, return to Dagestan and electoral politics (1917–1918) ==
Korkmasov returned to Dagestan in May 1917, amidst the Russian Revolution. By the time of his return, the North Caucasus was ruled by the Union of the Peoples of the Northern Caucasus, an effectively-independent body that claimed autonomy under the Russian Provisional Government. Together with Dahadayev, Alibek Ṭahaq̇adiqala, Saed Gabiyev and others, he formed the Dagestan Socialist Group, comprising Dagestan's premier, largely-leftist intellectuals. The group was small; Ṭahaq̇adiqala would later claim that it effectively comprised a group of five or six men. Of the Socialist Group's members, Korkmasov was the most radical and had the most enemies among Dagestan's local elite. Upon his return, he proclaimed that "whether the mullahs want it or not, the revolution will decide the land question and the status of women in its own way", in remarks that incensed the general population.

The Socialist Group's early activities were protests calling for the resignation of Ibrahim Gaydarov from Dagestan Oblast's local administration. They soon scored a significant victory after bringing Ali-Hajji of Akusha, the sheikh of a Naqshbandi tariqa who was the de facto ruler of the Dargin, Kaitag-Tabasaran and Temir-Khan-Shura districts. At a rally during Mid-Sha'ban in June 1917 or 1918, Ali-Hajji endorsed the Socialist Group, saying that their electoral victory would be beneficial for sharia law. This support enabled the group to expand its presence, building a coalition between moderate clergy members and socialists.

In the leadup to the 5 August 1917 election to Dagestan's local government, the Regional Executive Committee, Korkmasov heavily emphasised the Socialist Group's proposed land reforms. These reforms interested the local peasantry, and the elections resulted in a decisive victory for the Socialist Group. Basiyat Shakhanov, a member of the centre-left Socialist Revolutionary Party affiliated with the Socialist Group, was elected as Commissar of the Dagestan Regional Executive Committee, while Korkmasov was appointed chairman. The majority of seats in the committee went to either members of the Socialist Group or individuals who had expressed support for them. Korkmasov earned the derogatory nickname of keşiş (Cyrillic: кешиш), a Kumyk term for an Islamic preacher, from his political opponents in reference to his oratory skills and devotion to socialism.

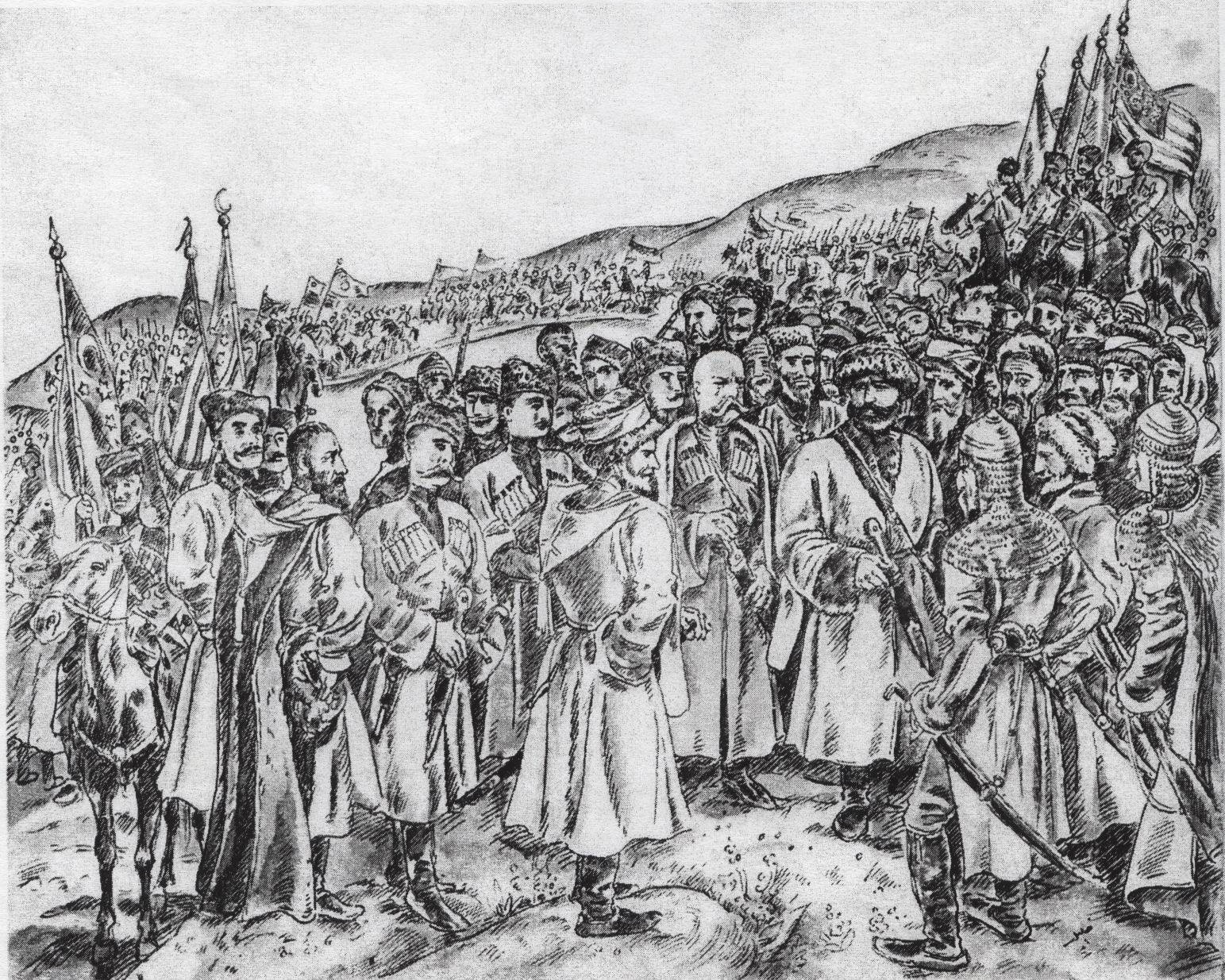
Najmuddin of Gotzo's Appointment as Imam in Andi by Xalilbeg Musajasul

Following the socialists' victory in the election, local religious leaders in Dagestan were alarmed by their increasing popularity. 12 days after the election, imams Najmuddin of Gotzo and Uzun-Hajji oversaw the Andi Congress. Though the event had been scheduled upon the conclusion of the First Congress of the Union of Highlanders of the North Caucasus in May, the socialist victory gave the imams further impetus to undertake drastic action. Najmuddin was briefly appointed as Imam of Dagestan and Chechnya by a group of five thousand local supporters from the Dagestani highlands, before being forced to relinquish the title three days later.

The short-lived attempt by Najmuddin to seize control of Dagestan sparked a political crisis in the North Caucasus, and several local political and religious leaders unaffiliated with the Socialist Group, such as sheikh Deni Arsanov and Haidar and Temir-Bulat Bammate. Najmuddin's attempted seizure of power was particularly opposed by Chechen sheikhs such as Arsanov, and a month later he accepted the lesser title of mufti. The fallout from the Andi Congress was minimised as a result of the October Revolution in metropolitan Russia, as a result of which the Provisional Government was overthrown and replaced by a Bolshevik government led by Vladimir Lenin. Korkmasov, as with all other members of the Socialist Group, strongly condemned the overthrow of the Provisional Government and expressed support for the deposed Russian Constituent Assembly.

== Civil War ==
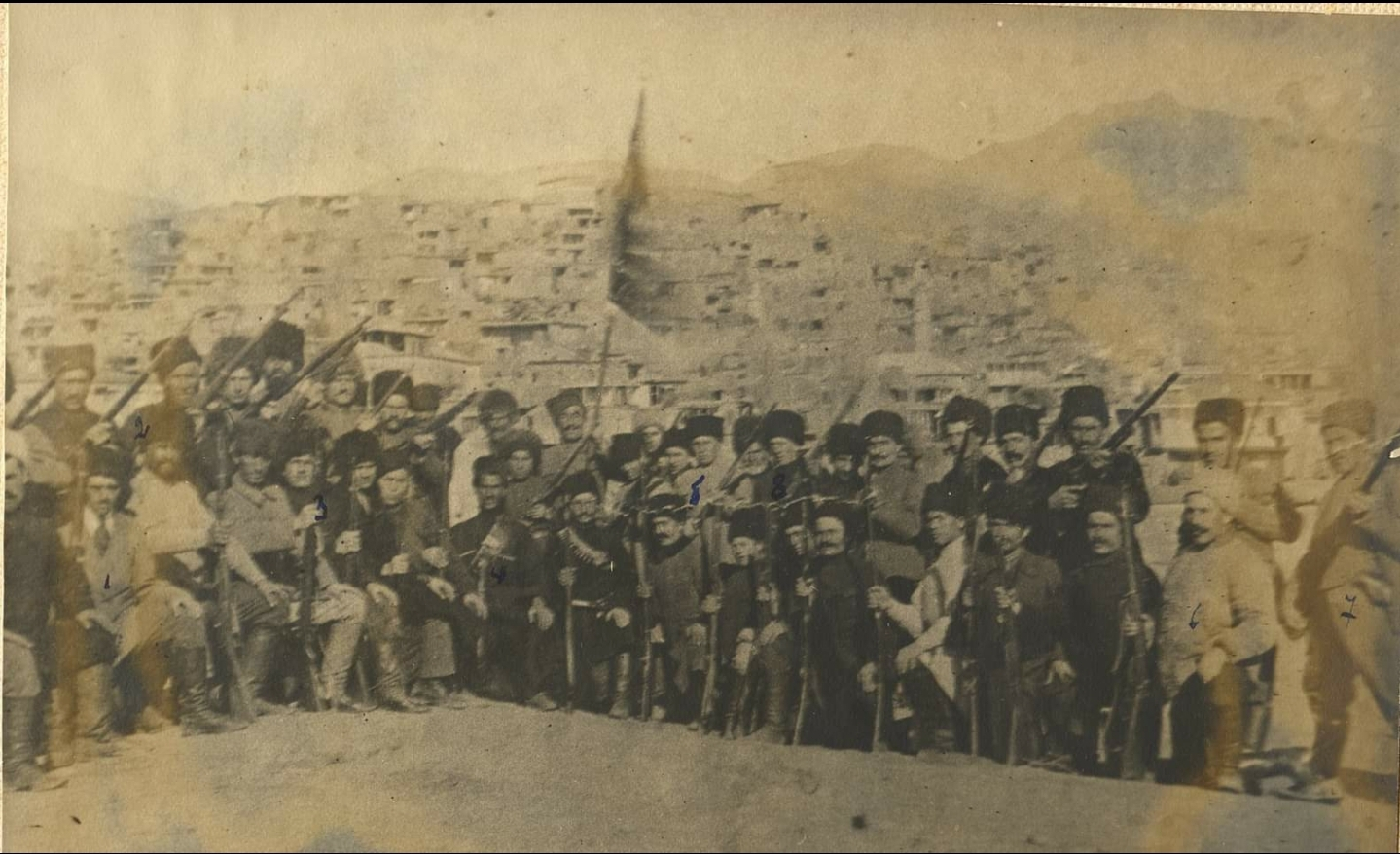
Pro-Regional Executive Committee soldiers during the First Battle of Port-Petrovsk, March–April 1918. It is disputed whether or not Korkmasov supported the decision to attack the Port-Petrovsk soviet

After the Andi Congress, but either shortly prior to or shortly after the October Revolution, the Second Congress of the Union of Highlanders of the North Caucasus was held. At the event, the Union of Highlanders declared itself to be independent from Russia as the Mountainous Republic of the Northern Caucasus. Korkmasov and the remainder of the Socialist Group continued to primarily involve themselves in fighting the Dagestan National Committee as the Russian Civil War escalated and began spreading to the North Caucasus. A soviet was formed in the city of Port-Petrovsk (now Makhachkala) by Bolshevik Ullu-biy Buynaksky in December 1917, as part of a Bolshevik strategy of reaching the South Caucasian city of Baku.

In January 1918, the National Committee marched on Temir-Khan-Shura with the intention of again declaring Najmuddin Imam of Dagestan and Chechnya. Shortly after being declared imam at the town's congregational mosque, however, he again backed down, leading Uzun-Hajji to leave the National Committee and leave politics for the North Caucasian highlands. Korkmasov enlisted the aid of Islamic scholar Ali al-Ghumuqi in convincing Najmuddin to step down by dismissing his claim to the title of imam as unjustified and illegal. Al-Ghumūqī's support for Korkmasov divided the Regional Executive Committee, which was by this point so embroiled in crisis as to be practically defunct, and particularly angered members of the National Committee. However, Nuh-bey Tarkovsky, a former Tsarist military officer associated with the National Committee, provided an armed contingent of 300–400 soldiers, as well as mountain guns and the intact fortress of the village Khunzakh to the Regional Executive Committee. With the Bolsheviks increasingly threatening the Mountainous Republic's government in Dagestan, the assistance was welcomed by the Executive Committee's leadership.

The First Battle of Port-Petrovsk began on 23 March 1918 as Najmuddin's forces entered the city at the Regional Executive Committee's urging in an effort to crush the soviet. Ṭahaq̇adiqala noted that the battle, which killed 1,200 people, was an effective declaration of war against the Russian Soviet Federative Socialist Republic, which surrounded the North Caucasus from the south (Baku), north (Astrakhan), and west (Vladikavkaz, which had been taken over by the Bolsheviks in January). In the aftermath of the battle, the Mountainous Republic quickly descended into anarchy, as militias loyal to Uzun-Hajji looted and destroyed the city of Khasavyurt.

The location of Korkmasov amidst the collapse of authority in Dagestan is unclear. Ṭahaq̇adiqala would later allege that none of the Socialist Group's members were active of this time besides himself, with Korkmasov travelling in the Terek Oblast due to involvement in a sheep theft case. Muhammad-Qadi Dibirov, a member of the Regional Executive Committee, however, recounted that the Socialist Group had been among the members of the executive committee that voted to attack the Port-Petrovsk Soviet. As the chaos unfolded, Korkmasov returned to Dagestan in April, and he was subsequently named as chairman of the Bolsheviks' Military Revolutionary Committee in Dagestan on 19 April 1918. In the ensuing battle, the Red Army won a decisive victory, with Red Guards entering the city on 1 May 1918.

=== Ottoman and British intervention ===
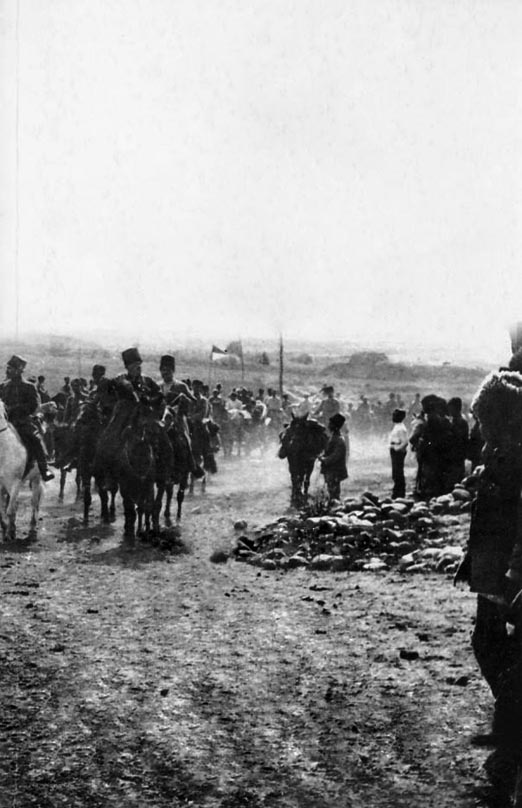
The defeat and subsequent execution of Red Army forces at the Battle of Baku left Korkmasov's pro-Bolshevik government isolated

While Korkmasov solidified his government, the Caucasus's total collapse was quickly evolving into an international theatre of World War I. The Three Pashas of the Ottoman Empire, seeking to establish a Pan-Turkic empire in the Caucasus and Central Asia, had invaded the South Caucasus seeking to take control of Baku. They were engaged by the British Army under Lionel Dunsterville, as the United Kingdom was fearful of the possibility of the Ottomans acquiring the oil of Baku and the raw cotton of Central Asia across the Caspian Sea. After the victory of the Ottomans' Islamic Army of the Caucasus at the Battle of Baku, they launched an intervention against the Bolsheviks with the intention of restoring order in the Mountainous Republic. In contrast to the Pan-Turkic campaigns in the South Caucasus, the Ottomans' Dagestan Campaign reflected the large presence of Circassians in the country following the Russian Empire's 19th-century Circassian genocide.

As pro-Bolshevik military commander Lazar Bicherakhov retreated from Baku and defected from the Red Army, Korkmasov soon found himself cut off. Baku Bolshevik leader Stepan Shaumian had been killed by the British-backed Centrocaspian Dictatorship as one of the 26 Baku Commissars after the city fell in July, and the nearest sources of supplies were in Astrakhan or Tsaritsyn. Forces loyal to Najmuddin of Gotzo, supported by the Ottomans and aiming to restore the Mountainous Republic, pushed onto the Kumyk plain, while the Kuban and Terek Cossacks had revolted against Bolshevik land reforms, leaving the Bolsheviks of Vladikavkaz and nearby Grozny unable to assist Korkmasov. Most seriously was Bicherakhov's own forces, which were now allied with the British presence in the Centrocaspian Dictatorship.

Facing opponents to the west and south, Korkmasov came under continuous demands from Bicherakhov to join him in defecting from the Bolsheviks to fight the Ottomans and the German Empire. Bicherakhov's soldiers and the Red Army units loyal to Korkmasov reached an agreement on 2 September 1918, as a result of which the former would gain Port-Petrovsk in exchange for non-interference in the latter's affairs. However, within two weeks the deal had collapsed as the Ottoman-backed Mountainous Republic began to push onto Temir-Khan-Shura. Not wanting the Ottomans to gain the upper hand, Bicherakhov reneged on the agreement to seize the city.

Nuh-bey Tarkovsky, representing the Ottomans and the Mountainous Republic, entered yet another series of negotiations with Bicherakhov, as a result of which he became leader of Dagestan in return for the Ottomans leaving Dagestan for the Azerbaijan Democratic Republic within a month. As September came to an end, mass repression of Bolsheviks in Dagestan ensued; Dahadayev was summarily executed by soldiers under Bicherakhov's command, while Korkmasov was placed under arrest. Boynaqlı, leader of the Port-Petrovsk Soviet, fled to the Bolshevik capital of Moscow. At the time, the Bolshevik movement in the North Caucasus seemed to be at an end.

=== White invasion and insurgency (1919–1920) ===
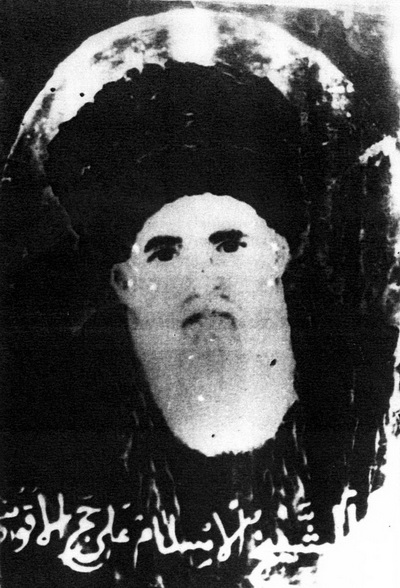
Ali-Hajji of Akusha, who led an insurgency in the North Caucasus during its occupation by the White movement

While Korkmasov was imprisoned the Socialist Group resolved to dissolve itself on 16 February 1919, merging with the Russian Communist Party (Bolshevik). A month later, the anti-communist Russian White movement, led by General Anton Denikin, launched an invasion of Chechnya. This was followed by an invasion of Dagestan two months later. As the government of the Mountainous Republic collapsed, Prime Minister Pshemakho Kotsev fled to the Dargin District to negotiate an alliance between Ali-Hajji and Uzun-Hajji against the Russian invasion. Meanwhile, the Bolshevik underground fled to Baku. During this time Korkmasov ended up out of imprisonment, and he travelled to the village of Levashi to join Ali-Hajji's anti-White insurgency.

The RCP(b) endorsed the uprising and made several attempts to co-opt the Security Council of the Northern Caucasus and Dagestan, the insurgents' provisional government. These efforts were disrupted by Ottoman officers, such as Nuri Pasha and Kâzım Bey, that had remained in the North Caucasus following the Armistice of Mudros that had ended World War I in the Middle East and the Caucasus. The Ottomans, too, sought to seize control of the Security Council, with the intention of using it to establish a series of satellite states throughout the Caucasus. Ultimately, the Bolsheviks would prevail, with Sultan-Said Kazbekov overthrowing Ali-Hajji as leader of the Security Council on 7 February 1920. Korkmasov was appointed as a member of the council in place of fifteen others who had been removed by Kazbekov. In late March 1920 the 11th Army division of the Red Army entered the Caucasus, bringing an end to White rule and establishing the Dagestan Autonomous Soviet Socialist Republic. On 11 April 1920 the Security Council was reorganised into a revolutionary committee governing all of Dagestan. Korkmasov was appointed chairman of the committee, with Safar Dudarov as his deputy.

== Leadership of Soviet Dagestan ==
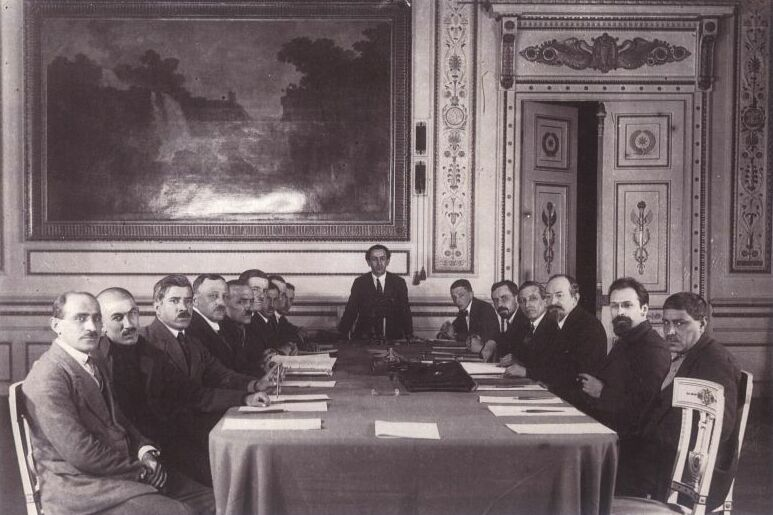
The signing of the Treaty of Moscow. Korkmasov is located in the centre.

Throughout his tenure as leader of the Dagestan ASSR, Korkmasov held various positions. He was from Chairman of the Dagestan Regional Committee of the RCP(B) 11 April to 26 November 1920 and later Chairman of the Council of People's Commissars from 5 December 1921 to 29 December 1931. Despite his changing portfolio, he continually held power as Dagestan's effective leader during this period.

Korkmasov's first major issue as leader of Dagestan was the Khasavyurt District, which had been separated from Dagestan and placed under the Terek Oblast following the Caucasian War. He began negotiating with the North Caucasian Revolutionary Committee and Sergo Ordzhonikidze, with the latter serving in his capacity as Red Army's Caucasian Front. As a result of the negotiations, Korkmasov obtained a victory, with the Khasavyurt District being annexed into Dagestan as the republic's tenth district on 11 April 1920. This was followed by the Karanogai District (today known as the Nogai District) on 16 November 1922 and the Kizylyar otdel on 4 November 1923, as a result of which the size of Dagestan was more than doubled.

Korkmasov also involved himself in the strengthening of Dagestan's local agricultural and industrial capabilities during his rule. Of particular interest to the largely-agrarian Dagestani society was irrigation and new canals, leading to the development of the October Revolution Canal. Construction began on 5 October 1921 with Korkmasov addressing a meeting of workers in Temir-Khan-Shura, in which he called upon all able-bodied citizens to join in the canal's construction. M. A. Abullayev has written that Korkmasov's speeches in support of the canal bred an "enthusiasm for collective labour unprecedented in the conditions of Dagestan," as well as a strong level of trust in and support for the Dagestani republican government. 15,000 people attended the October Revolution Canal's opening ceremony on 2 August 1923, including representatives from the other North Caucasian republics and metropolitan Russia.

In December 1922 Korkmasov First All-Union Congress of Soviets, during which he was one of the Russian SFSR's delegates involved in the drafting of the Treaty on the Creation of the Union of Soviet Socialist Republics. He was also a delegate at the 12th Congress of the RCP(B) in April 1923, during which he was included in a committee for discussing the matters of ethnic non-Russians within the newly established Soviet Union. In August of the same year, he travelled to Fascist Italy under a false name, being tasked with negotiating the de jure recognition of the Soviet Union by Italy. While awaiting an audience with Prime Minister of Italy Benito Mussolini and economic minister Orso Mario Corbino, he was given a tour of Emilia-Romagna, where he observed land reclamation and marsh draining projects that had been undertaken as part of Mussolini's developmental programme. This tour inspired Korkmasov to repeat the process in Dagestan's wetlands.

Korkmasov was particularly involved in Turkic affairs under Soviet rule. He was one of the negotiators of the 1921 Treaty of Moscow between the Russian SFSR and the Turkish Government of the Grand National Assembly, signing the treaty on the Russian government's behalf. He was co-chairman of the first First All-Union Turkological Congress, and deputy of the council tasked with drafting the Yañalif script for the romanisation of Turkic languages. In 1925, amidst the repression of the 1924–1925 Chechen uprising, Korkmasov was one of Dagestan's leaders, alongside Najmuddin Samurskii, who refused to allow a large-scale Red Army presence on their territory to detain suspected insurgents. Military operations in Dagestan eventually occurred in 1926, leading to the disarmament of the local population. In December 1931, Korkmasov was appointed to the Central Executive Committee of the Soviet Union as deputy secretary of the Soviet of Nationalities. His portfolio as deputy secretary included oversight of publishing, scientific and post-secondary educational institutions and religious affairs. Prior to his appointment, he was a member of the Central Executive Committee since its establishment in 1922, as well as a member of the All-Russian Central Executive Committee since 1920.

== Arrest and execution ==
Korkmasov's previously non-Bolshevik political views had been a source of trouble for him and his allies as early as 1920. Vadim Lukashev, representative of the Cheka in the North Caucasus, started a political scandal upon accusing Sergo Ordzhonikidze and Sergei Kirov of associating with Korkmasov, a "former right-wing SR" who Lukashev alleged was in contact with North Caucasian anti-communist émigrés. Both Kirov and Ordzhonikidze rejected the claims against Korkmasov, and although a December 1920 effort by the Central Committee of the RCP(B) cleared him of any connections to émigrés, it claimed that "no obvious falsehoods" regarding him had been stated in Lukashev's report. This uncertainty was a demonstration of both later Soviet government actions against the Dagestan Socialist Group and Korkmasov's depiction in local historiography. Fourteen years later, Samurskii would condemn the former members of the Socialist Group, saying that their activities "not only strengthened the rule of the bourgeoisie and their supporters, the clergy, but disorganised the working masses of Dagestan, amongst whom they helped to sow petty bourgeois illusions" in 1934.

On 22 June 1937, amidst the Great Purge, Korkmasov was arrested, alongside all other former members of the Socialist Group who were still alive. He was accused of creating a Pan-Turkic network aimed at dismantling the Soviet Union. He was tortured by the NKVD repeatedly, as was his wife, until he signed a document accepting responsibility for his involvement in the alleged organisation. Korkmasov's forced confession later was used to justify finding the other Socialist Group members guilty. Tried by the Supreme Court of the Soviet Union, he was found guilty on 27 September 1937 and sentenced to death. He was executed the same day in Moscow.

== Legacy ==
Korkmasov was among the primary representative of a group of Dagestani intellectuals in the late 19th and early 20th centuries who sought to divide Dagestani into ethnic subdivisions, in contrast to the National Committee and the Bammate family, who saw the Islamic faith as a unifying factor. This split between Islamists and secularists would later go on to define Dagestani politics throughout the 20th century. Some academics, such as Kharisova, have credited Korkmasov with bringing a Dagestani national consciousness to the general population during the Russian Revolution, and he has been occasionally been described as the founder of Dagestan. Alex Marshall, a historian at the University of Glasgow, has placed Korkmasov and the Socialist Group's other members as among those responsible for establishing the Soviet Union as a unique and less Russian-centred entity compared to the Russian Empire that preceded it.

== Bibliography ==
- Korkmasov, Anatoly (29 September 2010). "Коркмасов Джелал-Эд-Дин Асельдерович" [Korkmasov, Djelal ed-Din Aselderovich]. gazavat.ru (in Russian).
- Kharisova, Z. G. (2008). "Джелалэддин Коркмасов видный общественный и политический деятель Дагестана" [Djelal ed-Din Korkmasov, a prominent public and political figure of Dagestan]. Scientific Research in Education (in Russian) (1): 60–65 – via Cyberleninka.
- Marshall, Alex (2010). The Caucasus Under Soviet Rule. Oxford and New York City: Routledge. p. 387. ISBN 978-0-415-41012-0.
- Kagermanov, Kayrav (4 August 2022). "Джелал-Эд-Дин Коркмасов. Строитель Дагестана" [Djelal ed-Din Korkmasov: the Creator of Dagestan]. DagPravda.ru (in Russian).
- Lobanov, Vladimir; Artemyev, Aleksey (2019). "Владикавказский съезд горских народов Северного Кавказа в мае 1917 г." [The Vladikavkaz congress of Highlander peoples of the North Caucasus in May 1917]. Modern Scientific Thought (in Russian) (2): 73–77 – via Cyberleninka.
- Idrisov, Yu. M. (2007). "Дагестанская социалистическая группа в условиях революционного кризиса 1917 начала 1918 года" [The Dagestan Socialist Group in the conditions of the 1917 Revolutionary Crisis and early 1918]. News of A. I. Herzen Russian State Pedagogical University (in Russian). 19 (45): 101–105 – via Cyberleninka.
- Abdullayev, Magomed (2013). Триумф и трагедия шейх-уль-ислама Дагестана Али-Хаджи Акушинского [The triumph and tragedy of shaykh-al-Islam Ali-Hajji of Akusha] (in Russian). Makhachkala: Epoch. p. 368.
- Lobanov, Vladimir (2013). "История антибольшевистского движения на Северном Кавказе" [History of the Anti-Bolshevik Movement in the North Caucasus]. Poltorak (in Russian): 421 – via Academia.edu.
- Reynolds, Michael A. (2008). "Native Sons: Post-Imperial Politics, Islam, and Identity in the North Caucasus, 1917–1918". Jahrbücher für Geschichte Osteuropas. 56 (2): 221–247. JSTOR 41052053.
- Donogo, Hajji-Murad (2017). Андийский съезд. 1917 год [The Andi Conference: 1917] (in Russian). Makhachkala: Kitab. p. 68.
- Üre, Pınar (18 May 2021). "Circassian Nationalism". 1914–1918 Online.
- Yasacan, Mustafa (2018). "The Impact of the Russian Revolution 1917 on the Turkish Left through the Experiences of Three Leading Communists". Journal of Global Faultlines. 4 (2): 150–162. doi:10.13169/jglobfaul.4.2.0150. JSTOR 10.13169/jglobfaul.4.2.0150.
- Abdulkadyrov, Yu. N.; Gasanov, Nariman (2017). "Подлинный патриот Дагестана и России" [A true patriot of Dagestan and of Russia]. Social-Humanitarian Knowledge (in Russian) (1): 359–364 – via Cyberleninka.
- Sulayev, Imanutdin (2004). Совет обороны Северного Кавказа и Дагестана: неизвестные страницы истории [The Security Council of the Northern Caucasus and Dagestan: Unknown Pages of History] (in Russian). Makhachkala: Dagestan State University. p. 55.
- Nakhibashev, Makhach (2009). Узун-Хаджи Салтинский – общественно-политический и религиозный деятель Дагестана и Чечни [Uzun-Hajji of Salta – A Civic-Political and Religious Figure of Dagestan and Chechnya] (in Russian). Makhachkala: Epokha. p. 208.
- Daniyalov, G. D., ed. (1968). История Дагестана. Т. 3 [History of Dagestan: Book 3] (in Russian). Moscow: Main Editorial Office of Eastern Literature. p. 426.
- Osmanov, O. I. (2013). "Совет Обороны Северного Кавказа и Дагестана как коалиционное правительство и предшественник революционного комитета Дагестана (октябрь 1919 г. – апрель 1920 г. )" [The Security Council of the Northern Caucasus and Dagestan as a coalition government and predecessor of the Revolutionary Committee of Dagestan (October 1919–April 1920)]. News of the Kabardino-Balkar Scientific Centre of the Russian Academy of Sciences (in Russian). 6 (56): 183–189 – via Cyberleninka.
- Korkmasov, A. D. E. (14 February 2014). "Джелал КОРКМАС(ОВ). 20-е годы ХХ века – год 1923-й" [Celal Korkmas(ov): the 1920s – 1923]. Yoldash. Vol. 425–426. Archived from the original on 30 January 2019.
- Sultanov, Kazbek (29 May 2007). "Дж. Коркмасов – человек и политик" [Dzh. Korkmasov – the person and the politician]. Kumyk World (in Russian). Kumyk Scientific and Cultural Centre. Archived from the original on 17 October 2013.
- Abdulkhabirov, Magomed (18 August 2018). "Он памятник себе воздвиг нерукотворный" [It is a monument erected without hands]. Yoldash (in Russian).
