= Security Council of the Northern Caucasus and Dagestan =

Provisional government in Dagestan during the Russian Civil War

- Совет обороны Северного Кавказа и Дагестана
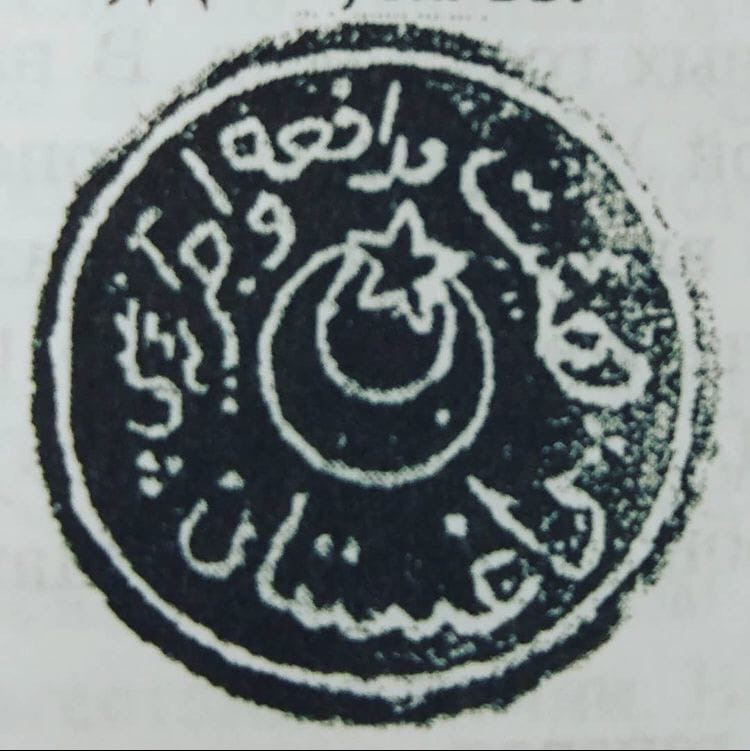
- Seal of the Security Council
- Leaders: Ali-Hajji of Akusha (until 7 February 1920); Sultan-Said Kazbekov (from 7 February 1920)
- Founded: 19 October 1919
- Dissolved: 11 April 1920
- Merged into: Dagestan Revolutionary Committee of the Russian Communist Party (Bolsheviks)
- Allegiance: Mountainous Republic of the Northern Caucasus
- Active regions: Dagestan
- Ideology: Islamism (until 7 February 1920); Pan-Caucasianism; Communism; Marxism–Leninism (from 7 February 1920)
- Wars: Russian Civil War

The Security Council of the Northern Caucasus and Dagestan (Russian: Совет обороны Северного Кавказа и Дагестана, romanized: Sovet oborony Severnogo Kavkaza i Dagestana) was a provisional government in Dagestan. Led by Shaykh al-Islām Ali-Hajji of Akusha, it was one of the main resistance groups against the Armed Forces of South Russia following the White Russian invasion of Dagestan, along with the North Caucasian Emirate.

== Background ==
The Mountainous Republic of the Northern Caucasus was established in 1917, following the February Revolution. After the White Russian invasion of Dagestan, Prime Minister Pshemakho Kotsev fled to the Dargin District. There, he met with shaykh al-Islām Ali-Hajji of Akusha, who had been a local military commander prior to the invasion. Kotsev convinced Ali-Hajji to join a meeting of government figures and his one-time opponent Uzun-Hajji. At the meeting, it was agreed to launch a resistance movement against the Russian invasion.

On 20 May 1919, the Mountainous Republic's government dissolved, and its members fled to the Democratic Republic of Georgia to establish a government-in-exile. The Bolsheviks, too, fled, travelling to Baku, although a few (Note: Specifically Djelal ed-Din Korkmasov, Muhammad-Mirza Khizroyev, Muhammad Dalgat, and Said Gabiyev.) travelled to the village of Levashi to join Ali-Hajji's resistance movement. The uprising against White Russian forces began in August 1919. Uzun-Hajji led forces in Chechnya and Ingushetia, while Ali-Hajji oversaw operations in Dagestan.

== Formation, activities, and support ==
The Security Council was formally established on 19 October 1919, including the following 19 representatives:

1. Ali-Hajji of Akusha
2. Uzun-Hajji
3. Ibrahim-Hajji of Kuchrab
4. Muhammad Ali Hajji
5. Muhammad-Qadi Rakushev
6. Davud Ibrahim
7. Alikhan Kantemir
8. Safar Dudarov
9. Zubair Temirkhanov
10. Bagadur Mallachikhanov
11. Gasanov-Effendi Effendi-zade
12. Abdu Samed Mursalov
13. Mama-Hajji
14. Osman Osmanov
15. Rabadan Nurov
16. Yusuf Molla Magomed
17. Omar Effendi Makhavat
18. Muta Ramazanov
19. Mola Osman

Several members of the Russian Communist Party (Bolshevik) were part of the Security Council, and the Dagestan Regional Committee of the RCP(b) had formally lent its support to the group. Their efforts to take control of the council were complicated by Ottoman Empire generals such as Nuri Pasha and Kâzım Bey, who had travelled to the Caucasus at the behest of Ali-Hajji and Uzun-Hajji to assist in fighting Russia and sought the establishment of pro-Ottoman puppet states in the North Caucasus.

Within its first days, the Security Council's controlled territory increased from the Dargin District to include the Kazi-Kumukh and Kaitag-Tabasaran districts. By the end of October, it was receiving medical, financial, and diplomatic support from the First Republic of Armenia, the Azerbaijan Democratic Republic, and Democratic Republic of Georgia. A six-month mobilisation of all men between 20 and 40 was announced, and the Security Council's military wing, the "People's Army of Freedom", was established. The oath of the People's Army of Freedom was as follows:

I, an askari of the People's Army of the Security Council of the Northern Caucasus, swear by the holy Quran to protect sharia, freedom, and the independence of the working peoples of the Northern Caucasus and the selected high power - the Security Council. I swear to fulfil the orders and instructions of the commanders appointed and trusted by the Security Council, fighting with all mortal foes and enemies of the people and the government.

The Security Council was also supported by the Allies of World War I. The United States government's American Committee for Relief in the Near East provided humanitarian aid to the council, and Italy, France, and the United Kingdom all provided diplomatic backing to the Security Council as the legitimate government of the Northern Caucasus.

=== Communist takeover and dissolution ===
At the second session of the Security Council on 7 February 1920, the Bolsheviks took control. The Ottoman officers were dismissed and forced to leave, while Ali-Hajji was himself replaced as leader by communist revolutionary Sultan-Said Kazbekov. Fifteen members of the council were removed, with Djelal ed-Din Korkmasov and Boris Sheboldayev being added in their place.

The 11th Red Army conquered the Northern Caucasus in late March 1920. Following this, the Security Council was reorganised into the revolutionary committee of Dagestan on 11 April 1920. Korkmasov was appointed as chairman of the revolutionary committee, with Safar Dudarov as his deputy.
