= Dagestan Socialist Group =

Political party in Dagestan, Mountainous Republic of the North Caucasus

Dagestan Socialist Group Дагестанская социалистическая группа
- Leader: Mahach Dahadayev
- Founded: May 1917
- Dissolved: 16 February 1919
- Merged into: Russian Communist Party (Bolshevik)
- Membership: 5–6
- Ideology: Socialism; Marxism; Secularism
- Political position: Left-wing

The Dagestan Socialist Group (Russian: Дагестанская социалистическая группа, romanized: Dagestanskaya sotsialisticheskaya gruppa) was a political organisation in Dagestan during the rule of the Mountainous Republic of the Northern Caucasus. It was one of two political groups in Dagestan, alongside the Islamist Dagestan National Committee. Located on the left wing of the political spectrum, the Socialist Group promoted opposition to Sharia law and land reform as its policies, leading the organisation and its allies to a landslide victory in the August 1917 regional elections in spite of it only consisting of 5–6 members at any time. Amidst the Battle of the North Caucasus during the Russian Civil War, the Socialist Group merged into the Russian Communist Party (Bolshevik) in February 1919.

== Formation ==
The Dagestan Socialist Group was founded in May 1917, shortly after Djelal ed-Din Korkmasov returned to the Dagestan Oblast from exile in France amidst the Russian Revolution. He was soon joined by Muhammad-Mirza Khizroyev, a Dagestani living in metropolitan Russia. In addition to the two were a group of four others: Alibek Ṭahaq̇adiqala, Mahach Dahadayev, Saed Gabiyev and A. M. Zulpukarov. The leader of the group was Dahadayev. Its membership included most of the leading members of the largely left-wing intelligentsia of Dagestan, which had been a colony of the Russian Empire until being thrown in a state of political flux amidst the revolution.

== Activity ==
The Socialist Group lacked a clear policy position, instead primarily being active in opposing pro-Sharia activism in Dagestan. The group's members comprised an eclectic mix of left-wing parties and ideologies; Korkmasov was an anarchist or Menshevik; Khizroyev a Bolshevik; Ṭahaq̇adiqala a self-described "non-partisan socialist"; Dahadayev an internationalist Bolshevik; Gabiyev a Socialist Revolutionary; an Zulpukarov a non-partisan supporter of internationalism. An early scandal involving the group occurred shortly upon the return of Korkmasov, the group's most radical member, from exile; he said "whether the mullahs want it or not, the revolution will decide the land question and the status of women in its own way," causing an outrage among the largely-Sufi Muslim population of Dagestan. Other early activities of the Socialist Group involved protesting for the removal of Ibrahim Gaydarov from the provisional executive government in Dagestan.

On Mid-Sha'ban in June 1917 or 1918 the Socialist Group obtained the endorsement of Ali-Hajji of Akusha, the sheikh of a local Naqshbandi tariqa who was the de facto leader of the Dargin, Kaitag-Tabarasan and Temir-Khan-Shura districts of Dagestan. This was a significant victory for the group, as it enabled them to build a coalition between moderate members of Dagestan's local clergy and leftist intellectuals. During the August 1917 elections to Dagestan's Provisional Regional Executive Committee, the Socialist Group focused on peasants, with Korkmasov delivering speeches on the group's proposed land reforms. These appeals led the peasantry to hand the Socialist Group a landslide victory on 5 August, with 16 members or non-members aligned with the group being elected to the Regional Executive Committee. Korkmasov was appointed as the committee's chairman, with Socialist Revolutionary Basiyat Shakhanov being elected commissar.

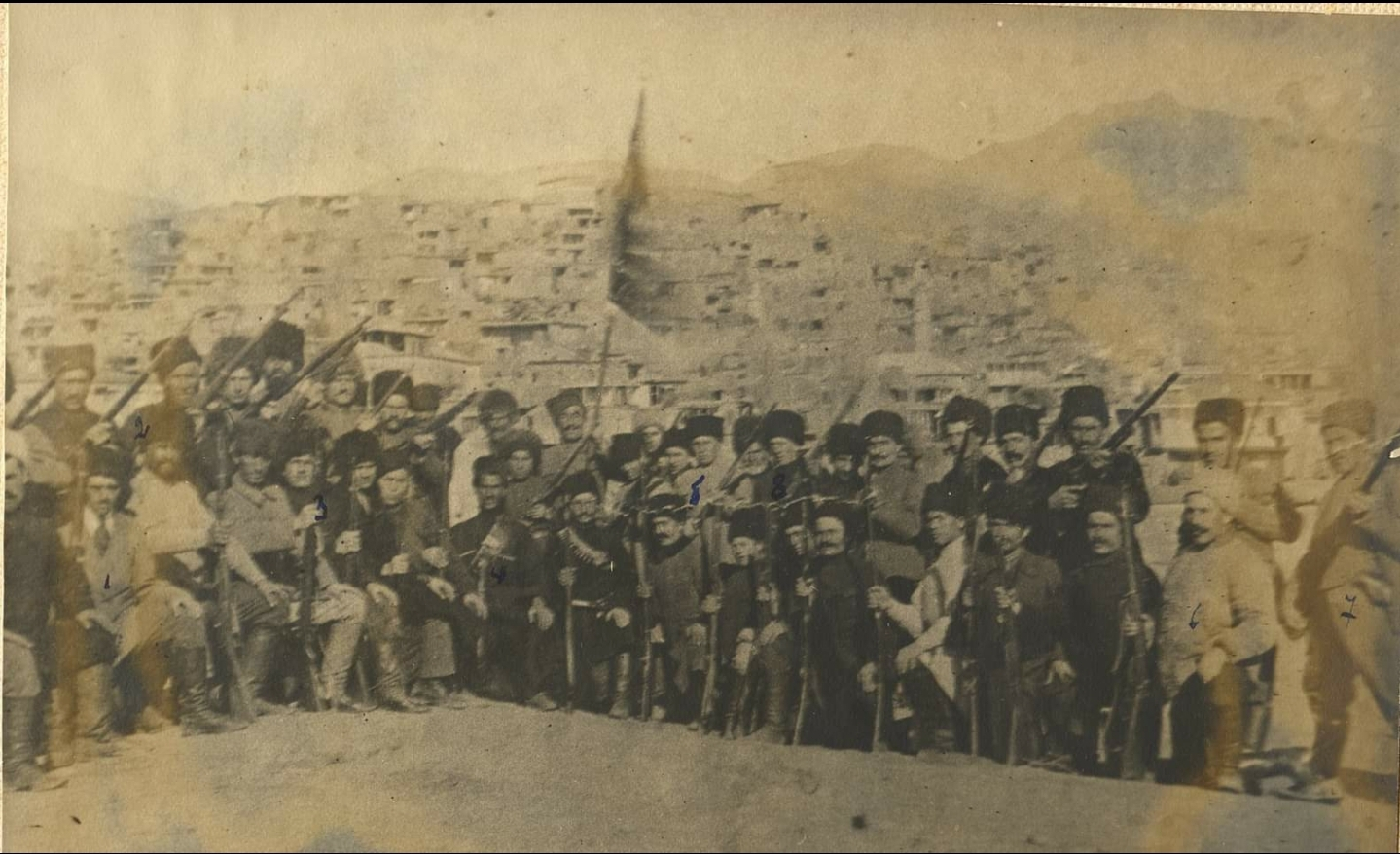
It is unclear whether the Socialist Group voted in favour of attacking the Port-Petrovsk soviet; the decision to do so launched the First Battle of Port-Petrovsk

The Socialist Group condemned the October Revolution and expressed solidarity with the Russian Provisional Government. After a soviet was established in the city of Port-Petrovsk (now Makhachkala) in December 1917 as part of a strategy by the Bolsheviks to reach the Azerbaijani city of Baku, the Regional Executive Committee voted to attack the soviet. This sparked a battle in the city in which 1,200 people died and which served as an effective declaration of war against the Russian Soviet Federative Socialist Republic. The role of the Socialist Group in these events is disputed; Ṭahaq̇adiqala claimed in 1927 that all members except himself were occupied with other business, while he was personally unable to stop the attack from being confirmed. Muhammad-Qadi Dibirov, a member of the Regional Executive Committee, denied this was true, saying that the majority of the Socialist Group had voted to go ahead with the battle.

The Second Battle of Port-Petrovsk began in April 1918. The members of the Socialist Group defected to the Bolsheviks during the battle, with Korkmasov being named as chairman of the Military Revolutionary Committee of Dagestan on 19 April. The battle resulted in a victory for the Bolsheviks and the Socialist Group. This led to an Ottoman intervention aiming to restore the Mountainous Republic of the Northern Caucasus, which was followed by a British intervention to stop the Ottoman intervention. This was coupled with an anti-socialist uprising in Chechnya and western Dagestan, led by the Socialist Group's main rivals, the Islamist Dagestan National Committee. Forces loyal to pro-British warlord Lazar Bicherakhov and the Centrocaspian Dictatorship were given control of Port-Petrovsk in return for non-interference in the Military Revolutionary Committee's internal affairs; Bicherakhov later disregarded this agreement, seizing the capital of Temir-Khan-Shura (now Buynaksk) to prevent Ottoman forces from taking it. This led to the collapse of the Military Revolutionary Committee and a purge of Dagestani socialists; Dahadayev was executed, while others, such as Korkmasov, were arrested.

== Merger and legacy ==
The Socialist Group merged into the Russian Communist Party (Bolshevik) on 16 February 1919, shortly before the White movement's invasions of Chechnya and Dagestan allowed its surviving members to leave prison. Some members and affiliates of the group, such as Korkmasov and Sultan-Said Kazbekov later fought against the Whites during the 1919–1920 North Caucasus uprising. Korkmasov took control of Dagestan following the uprising, becoming the first leader of the Dagestan Autonomous Soviet Socialist Republic.

During the Great Purge the Socialist Group's former members were collectively arrested under the claim that Korkmasov had created a pan-Turkic group seeking to dismantle the Soviet Union. All of them were executed after Korkmasov was tortured into signing a forced confession.
