= Ullu-biy Buynaksky =

Dagestani communist revolutionary (1890–1919)

- Boynaqlı Ullu-Biy; Бойнакълы Уллу-Бий; Уллубий Буйнакский
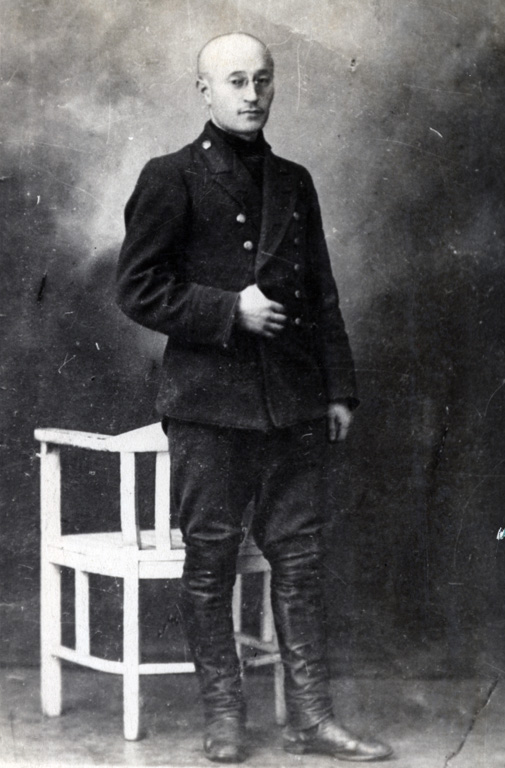

Chairman of the Dagestan Regional Committee of the Russian Communist Party (Bolshevik)
- In office c. June 1918 – 13 May 1919
- Preceded by: Position established
- Succeeded by: Position abolished (Note: Succeeded by Djelal ed-Din Korkmasov in April 1920. Succeeded as leader of Dagestan by Nuh-bey Tarkovsky.)

Personal details
- Born: 8 September 1890 Ullubiyaul, Dagestan Oblast, Caucasus Viceroyalty (now Republic of Dagestan, Russia)
- Died: 16 August 1919 (aged 28) Port-Petrovsk, Dagestan Oblast
- Cause of death: Execution by decapitation
- Party: Russian Communist Party (Bolsheviks)
- Other political affiliations: Russian Social Democratic Labour Party (from 1916); Bolsheviks; Dagestan Socialist Group
- Education: Imperial Moscow University (expelled)

Military service
- Allegiance: Bolsheviks
- Battles/wars: Russian Civil War; First Battle of Port-Petrovsk; World War I; Dagestan Campaign (1918) (POW) (executed)

Ullu-biy Daniyalovich Buynaksky (Note: Russian: Уллубий Даниялович Буйнакский; Kumyk: Бойнакълы Уллу-Бий Даниялны уланы, romanized: Boynaqlı Ullu-Biy Daniyalnı ulanı) (8 September 1890 – 16 August 1919) was a Dagestani communist revolutionary and military commander active during the Russian Civil War.

== Biography ==
He was born in the village of Ullubiyaul in the family of a hereditary Kumyk nobleman (uzden) and military officer. Buynaksky studied at the law faculty of Imperial Moscow University. He became a member of the Bolshevik faction of the Russian Social Democratic Labour Party in 1916, for which he was expelled from the university.

After the February Revolution, he conducted party work in the Khamovnichesky District of Moscow. In November 1917, he headed the military revolutionary committee of Port-Petrovsk (now Makhachkala). From April 1918, he was a member of the Regional Military Revolutionary Committee, which was transformed in June into the Regional Executive Committee of Soviets, where he served as head of the legal department.

He was sent illegally to Dagestan and reached the heights of Ullu-Tau where the Regional Executive Committee headed by Djelal ed-Din Korkmasov functioned underground, the overwhelming majority of which consisted of members of the Dagestan Socialist Group. After unifying the Socialist Group, Buynaksky was elected Chairman of the Dagestan Regional Committee of the Russian Communist Party (Bolsheviks). The conference also decided to transform the Regional Executive Committee into a Military Council headed by Korkmasov, whose task included organizing and leading the uprising against the occupiers.

After the expulsion of Lazar Bicherakhov's forces from Dagestan after battles with Ottoman units, the government of the Mountainous Republic of the Northern Caucasus, under pressure from local military forces agreed to arrest Buynaksky and other communists, who were preparing a coup d'état. They were arrested at a meeting on 13 May. At the end of May, pro-British detachments of the Armed Forces of South Russia launched an invasion of Dagestan and dissolved the Mountainous Republic; some of the government's officials fled, while others chose to collaborate with the Russians. Buynaksky was transferred to the Port-Petrovsk prison.

The remaining Bolsheviks, led by Korkmasov, who at some point prior to the Whites' invasion, became active in the Temir-Khan-Shura and Dargin districts and raised an unsuccessful uprising in July. The arrested Bolsheviks, including Buynaksky, were brought before a military sharia court and sentenced first to hard labor, then to execution, which was carried out on 18 August 1919 in the area of the Temirgoe station.

He was buried in a mass grave with other revolutionaries in Temir-Khan-Shura (now Buynaksk).

== Legacy ==
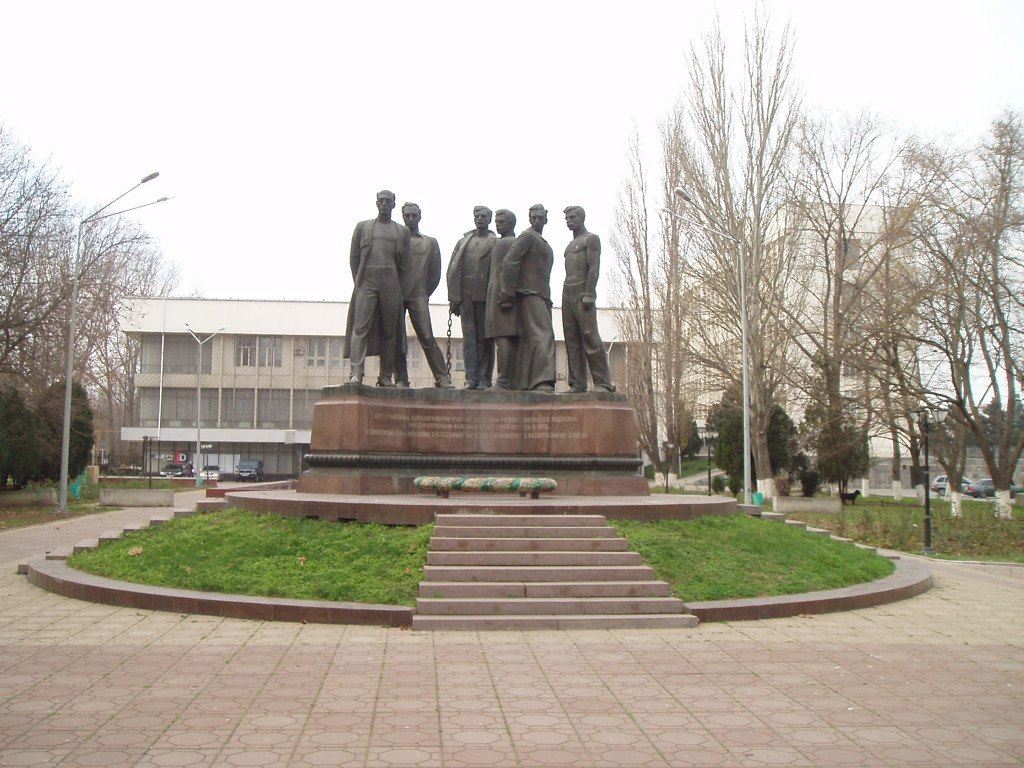
Monument to the fighters for Soviet power in the square of the Fighters of the Revolution in Makhachkala.

In honor of Buynaksky, in 1921 the city of Temir-Khan-Shura, the capital of Dagestan, was renamed Buynaksk. In addition, Ullubiyaul (former Boynak), Ullubiyevka (Novopokrovka), Ullubi-Yurt (former New Jelal), Ullubiy (from 1944 to 1957 the name of the village Church-Irzu) were renamed in his honor.

Multiple streets in Makhachkala, other settlements in Dagestan, as well as in Astrakhan, Rostov-on-Don, Stavropol, Grozny, Chervlennaya station (Chechnya), Kizlyar village (North Ossetia), and Achikulak settlement (Stavropol Krai) are named in his honor.
