= Nuh-bey Tarkovsky =

North Caucasian military commander (1878–1951)

Shamkhal prince Nuh-Bey Tarkovsky
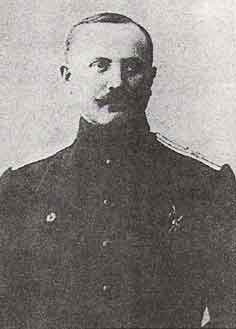
- Native name: Таргъулу Нугь-Бек Хан-огълу
- Born: 15 May 1878; Torqali, Russian Empire (now Korkmaskala, Dagestan, Russia)
- Died: 19 January 1951 (aged 72) Lausanne, Switzerland
- Allegiance: Russian Empire; Mountainous Republic of the Northern Caucasus
- Branch: Imperial Russian Army
- Service years: 1897—1920
- Commands: Caucasian Native Cavalry Division
- Awards: Order of St. George; Order of St. Stanislaus; Order of St. Anna; Order of St. Vladimir; Golden Weapon for Bravery
- Spouse: Gulruh

Nuh-bey Khanovich Tarkovsky (Note: Kumyk: Таргъулу Нугь-Бек Хан-огълу, romanized: Tarğulu Nuh-Bek Han-oğlu; Russian: Нух-бек Ханович Тарковский) (15 May [O.S. 3 May] 1878 – 19 January 1951) was a North Caucasian military commander, prince and shamkhal. A descendant of the rulers of the Shamkhalate of Tarki, he was Minister of War of the Mountainous Republic of the Northern Caucasus.

== Early life and career ==
Nuh-bey Tarkovsky was born on 15 May 1878, in the village of Torqali, in the Temir-Khan-Shurinsky okrug of the Dagestan Oblast (now Korkmaskala in the Republic of Dagestan). He began his studies at a realschule in Temir-Khan-Shura (now Buynaksk), and in 1889 was sent to the Simbirsk Cadet Corps, from which he successfully graduated in 1897. On 31 August 1897 he entered the Nikolayev Cavalry School in Saint Petersburg as an junker private. On 20 June 1899 he was promoted to a non-commissioned officer, and on 8 August, after graduating from college in the first category, he was promoted to cornet with distribution to the Ossetian Cavalry Division as part of the Caucasus Cavalry Division. Then he was transferred to the Dagestan Cavalry Regiment of the 3rd Caucasus Cossack Division.

== During World War I ==
On 25 November 1914, Tarkovsky was appointed commander of the reserve sotnia of the 2nd Dagestan Cavalry Regiment. From 1 December 1914 he fought on the Southwestern Front. In April 1915 he was approved in the princely rank and in the same year he was presented to the Order of Saint Anna IV class with an inscription for bravery.

For a personal feat during the capture of the village of Dobropole, Ternopil Oblast, the commander of the Caucasian Native Cavalry Division, major general Dmitry Bagration petitioned for Tarkovsky to be awarded with a Golden Weapon for Bravery. In October 1916, as a lieutenant colonel he was sent to the Caucasus to organize replenishment. Between 1917 and 1918 Tarkovsky commanded the Dagestan cavalry regiment of the Caucasian Native Cavalry Division.

== Revolution and Civil War ==
On 22 March 1917 Tarkovsky was elected from Temir-Khan-Shura to the Provisional Regional Executive Committee of the Great Assembly, which was chaired by Zubair Temirkhanov. In April he was elected a delegate to the Mountainous Republic of the Northern Caucasus in Vladikavkaz. He entered the Central Committee of the Union of Highlanders as chairman of the Dagestan section with a seat in Temir-Khan-Shura. As such worked as part of the Provisional Regional Executive Committee, the head of which was socialist faction leader Djelal ed-Din Korkmasov since August 1917.

In November 1918, he transferred his powers to the government of the Mountainous Republic. Subsequently, the Mountainous Republic's Prime Minister, Pshemakho Kotsev arrived in Dagestan with Ottoman troops. On 20 December he was appointed Minister of War in Kotsev's government. Following the defeat of the Ottoman Empire in the Dagestan Campaign, the country's detachments left Dagestan. Their departure was followed by the arrival of Anton Denikin's Volunteer Army, which launched an invasion of Chechnya, followed by an offensive into Dagestan. In February 1919, Tarkovsky became acting head of government of the Mountainous Republic, as well as Minister of Foreign Affairs. On 9 and 14 March of the same year, he protested to the representatives of the Allies, who were located in Baku at the time, about the presence of White Russian troops in the Mountainous Republic. After the failure of Tarkovsky's protests, he resigned from all positions on 25 March 1919. He subsequently began collaborating with the Armed Forces of South Russia as they faced an anti-White uprising.

== Emigration ==
After Denikin's defeat, Tarkovsky emigrated to Iran where his wife's relatives lived. Despite an audience with Ahmad Shah Qajar of the Qajar dynasty he did not receive any positions. At the end of 1920, he moved to the Ottoman Empire, but following the Turkish War of Independence and the establishment of relations with Soviet Russia, he again migrated to France. Then, with the beginning of World War II, he moved to Switzerland and died in Lausanne in 1951.

== Family ==
His wife Gulruh (also called Gulyusha, born approximately 1882) was from a noble Persian family. They had two daughters and a son, who at the year of his father's death lived in Tehran and worked as an engineer.

== Awards ==
- Order of St. George 4th class
- Order of Saint Stanislaus 3rd class (1905), swords and a bow to it (1915)
- Order of Saint Anna 3rd class (1908)
- Order of St. Stanislaus 2nd class with swords (1911)
- Order of St. Anna 2nd class (1913)
- Order of Saint Vladimir 4th class with swords and bow (1915)
- Order of St. Anna 4th class with the inscription "For bravery" (1915)
- Golden Weapon for Bravery (1915)

== See also ==
- Abdul-bey Tabasaransky
- Shamkhalate of Tarki
