= Dagestan Campaign (1918) =

Battle between the Ottoman and Russian Empires

- Part of the Caucasus campaign and World War I
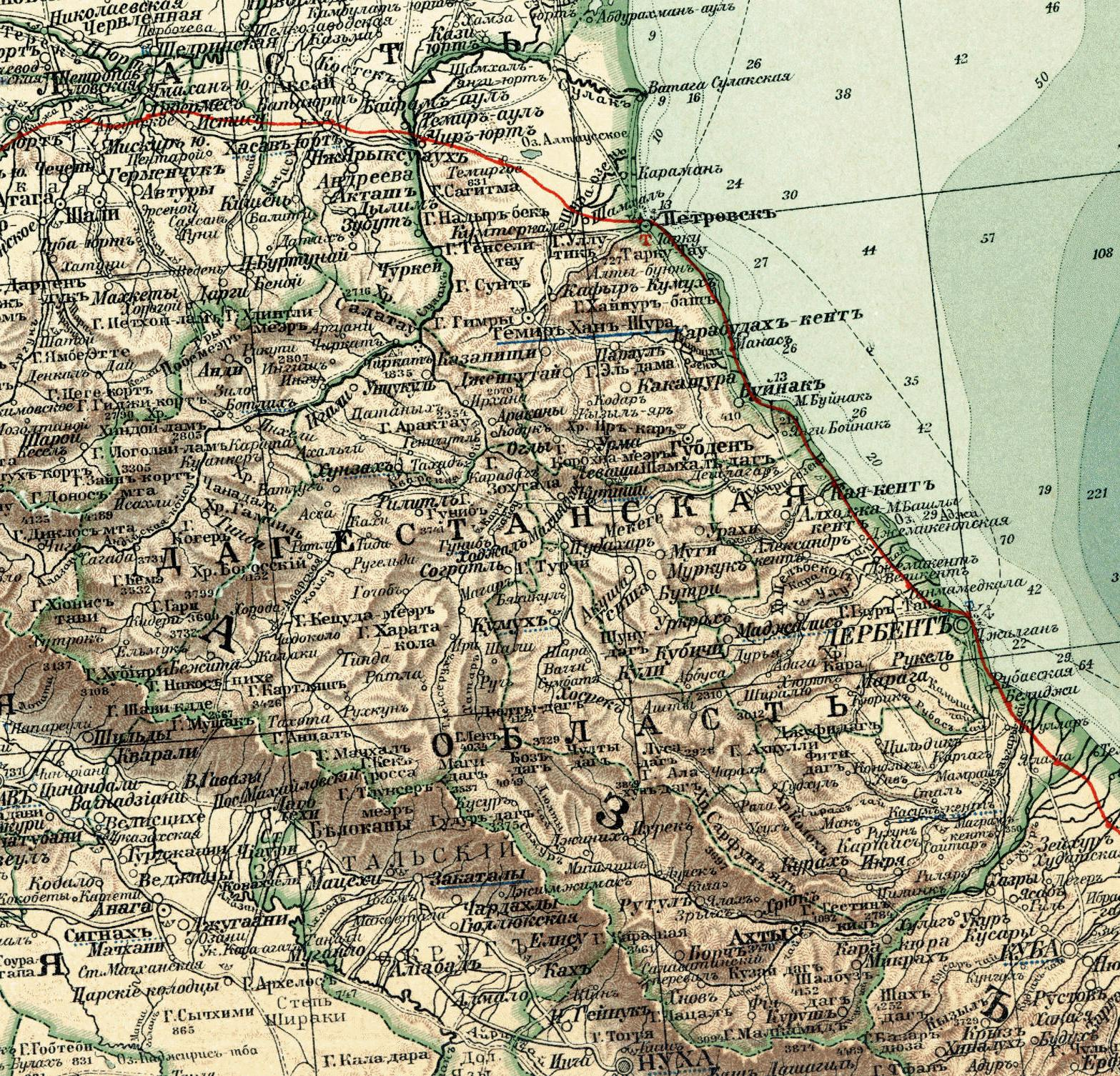
Date	1 August – 20 September 1918 (51 days)
Location	Dagestan
Result	1st phase: Russian White victory 2nd phase: Ottoman victory
Territorial changes	Temporary occupation of Dagestan by Bicherakhov’s forces; Defeat of the Soviet rule in Dagestan; Temporary occupation of Dagestan by the Ottomans

Belligerents
Russian State; United Kingdom	Ottoman Empire; Mountainous Republic of the Northern Caucasus	Russian Soviet Socialist Republic

Commanders and leaders
Lazar Bicherakhov; Lionel Dunsterville	Enver Pasha Tapa Chermoev	Ullu-biy Buynaksky (executed); Djelal ed-Din Korkmasov (surrendered)

Strength
3,000 Cossacks 1 gunboat Ardahan	11,564 448 Officers	4,500

Casualties and losses
Heavy	Heavy	2,000 killed&wounded

The Dagestan Campaign (Turkish: Dağıstan Seferi) was a battle between the Ottoman Empire and Russia that happened right after the Battle of Baku during World War I. After the victory in Baku, Ottoman soldiers occupied the Dagestani cities of Derbent and Port-Petrovsk. However, the Ottoman Empire was defeated and the territories were seized by the Russian Soviet Federative Socialist Republic.

== Background ==
After the Russian Revolution and the Russian retreat from Caucasus, the Islamic Army of the Caucasus was formed. They conducted campaigns against the Russian Caucasus territories to create a safe area for Muslim people, and to establish the Republic of Azerbaijan with their commander Nuri Pasha. After the Battle of Baku, Nuri Pasha returned to the capital, while Süleyman İzzet and his army captured the Dagestani cities of Derbent and Port-Petrovsk.

== Campaign ==
=== Battle of Mammadkali ===
The semi-partisan tactics of the Russians made it possible to push back the enemy and conduct an offensive operation at Mamedkala. In the battle of 13 October the guns of the Kars and Ardagan gunboats, as well as field and heavy artillery guns from the Primorskaya valley, suppressed the Turkish batteries with crossfire, three battalions attacked the enemy's positions in the foothills, and the Cossacks made a deep flank coverage, passing through the mountains. The Turkish front was breached. Izzet Pasha, who had retreated to Derbent, sent a parliamentarian, but Nikitin continued the offensive.

Moving heavy artillery from Mamedkala to the Ogni crossing, the Russians demolished part of the trenches of the Turkish front line with 9-inch bombs, and Izzet Pasha had to stop the Turkish infantry himself, who retreated to Derbent. The next day, Izzet Pasha sent the parliamentarians to Bicherakhov, saying, "Who are you? Russia is no more and never will be. Go north, beyond the Kuban." Bicherakhov rejected the request.

=== Further developments ===
Due to the overwhelming superiority of the Turks in numbers and weapons, Bicherakharov could not stop their advance, but he could gain time. While the western Allies were finishing off the Ottomans on all fronts, the Russians retreated, waging heavy rearguard battles for the Turks, slowing their offensive and inflicting heavy losses At the railway station near Makhachkala, the Turks were able to surround a small detachment of white Cossacks, however, by successfully maneuvering and thanks to the reinforcements that hit the Turks in time, the Cossacks were able to break through the encirclement and defeat the Turks, continuing the planned retreat.

== Battle of Tarkin Height ==
Battle of Tarkin Height
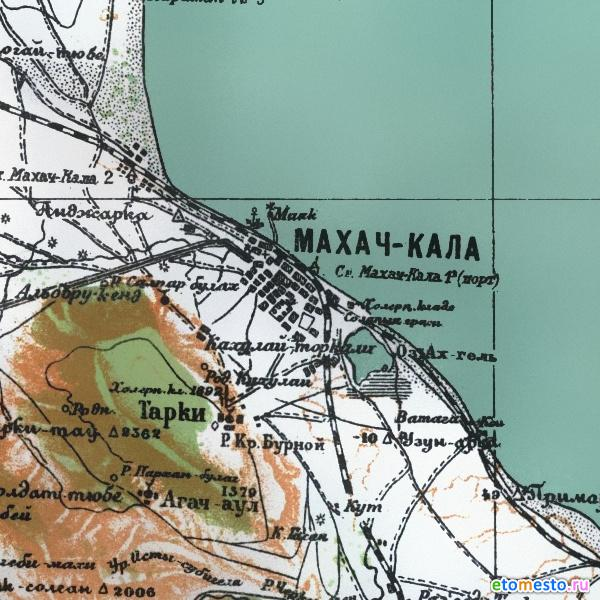
Date	4–6 November 1918
Location	Port-Petrovsk, Dagestan
Result	Russian victory

Belligerents
Ottoman Empire; Mountainous Republic of the Northern Caucasus	(Russia) Cossacks; (Russia) Caucasian Corps (remnants)

Commanders and leaders
Suleiman Izzet Pasha	Boris Nikitin

Strength
Unknown	Unknown

Casualties and losses
113 killed 318 injured	80 killed and wounded

On 30 October, Armistice of Mudros came into force, The Turks did not stop the fighting and took advantage of the panic in the rear of the Russians, launching a general offensive.

In the battle of 4–5 November in the western mountain sector of defense — the heights of Tarki-Tau — the Russians stopped the enemy after the third counterattack, and on the morning of the 5th broke through his front in the direction of Kizil-Agach. In this battle, the Ural officer's Cossack fifty, which turned out to be passing through Port-Petrovsk and came to the aid of the defenders of the city, as well as the 2nd amphibious detachment of sailors of the Caspian Flotilla, were almost completely killed. Only the approach of Ali Mitayev's Chechen detachment helped stop the Russian counterattack. According to Nikitin, the cunning "old kunak", who was considered a friend of the Russians, but always fought against them, two months later he himself told him about this battle in detail.

The Turks, with a large number of machine guns and supported by field artillery from closed positions to the west of the plateau, counterattacked steadily, and in places climbed the heights of Tarki Tau, the last Russian defensive line. The headquarters of Nikitin's field troops was located on the ruins of the fortress in Tarki. From there, the Russians fought off attacks with bayonets, supported by four Cossack machine guns and two horse-mountain guns that fired buckshot. Howitzers located on the southern spur of the mountain range covered the enemy's location with bombs.

After that, a small flotilla arrived at the Russians and began shelling the Turks, slowing down their strike.

=== General offensive ===
The bombardment slowed the Turks' preparations for the offensive, but by 5:00 p.m. Izzet Pasha had concentrated his forces in front of the Russian position, and part of his forces had flanked the ruins of the fortress, preparing to deliver a decisive blow. Having raised the staff team and the last reserve battalion, only about 400 people, in a counterattack, Nikitin, supported by the machine guns of cornet Khmara and the horse-mountain guns of Staff Captain Guibert, rolled out under the fire of Turkish machine guns to an open position, and beat at point-blank range, managed to push back the enemy, who did not accept bayonet combat and hid in the surrounding forests. The Russians lost 80 men killed and wounded in this attack, and two artillery soldiers went mad with terror and threw themselves from the cliff into the abyss. By the evening, the fighting had stopped, but the shelling of the Turks from gunboats from the sea had meanwhile resumed. The next twenty-four hours passed in silence. Nikitin sent all the officers from Tarka to the port to restore order and gather the deserters. The next day, they returned to their positions.

According to the associates of Suleiman Izzet Pasha, in this battle they shot all the cartridges of their field and head fleets.

== Aftermath ==
The occupation did not last long, as the Ottoman Empire was beaten in Mesopotamia, and had to sign the Armistice of Mudros as a result. The empire gave up all of its Caucasus territories, leaving chaos.

== Sources ==
- Reynolds, Michael A. (2003). The Ottoman-Russian Struggle for Eastern Anatolia and the Caucasus, 1908-1918: Identity, Ideology and the Geopolitics of World Order. Princeton University. p. 446. ISBN 978-0-496-55425-6.
- Demir, İsmet (1993). Osmanlı Devleti ile Azerbaycan Türk hanlıkları arasındaki münâsebetlere dâir arşiv belgeleri: Karabağ-Şuşa, Nahçıvan, Bakü, Gence, Şirvan, Şeki, Revan, Kuba, Hoy (in Persian). Devlet Arşivleri Genel Müdürlüğü. pp. 225–235. ISBN 978-975-19-0725-7.
- Hovannisian, Richard G. "Armenia on the Road to Independence, 1918". The SHAFR Guide Online: 205. doi:10.1163/2468-1733_shafr_sim070080055.
- "Azərbaycan Respublikası Mədəniyyət Nazirliyi Milli Azərbaycan Tarixi Muzeyi". Şuşa: Tarixi-mədəni irsin tədqiqi. 47. 2023. doi:10.30546/978-9952-8412-3-7.002-65. f. 970, siy.1, is.̧ 1, v.47-47a.
