= Ullubiyaul =

Ullubiyaul Уллубийаул Уллу Бойнакъ
- Selo
- Location within Republic of Dagestan Location within Russia
- Coordinates: 42°35′N 47°43′E
- Country: Russia
- Region: Republic of Dagestan
- District: Karabudakhkentsky District
- Time zone: UTC+3:00

Ullubiyaul (Kumyk: Уллу Бойнакъ, Ullu Boynaq; Russian: Уллубийаул) is a rural locality (a selo) in Karabudakhkentsky District, Republic of Dagestan, Russia. The population was 3,666 as of 2010. There are 39 streets.

== Geography ==
Ullubiyaul is located 42 km northwest of Novokayakent (the district's administrative centre) by road. Achi-Su and Achi are the nearest rural localities.

== Nationalities ==
Kumyks live there.

== Famous residents ==
- Ullu-biy Buynaksky (Dagestani communist revolutionary)
- Abdurakhman Shiravov (participant of the Great Patriotic War, full holder of the Order of Glory)
