= Dagestan Regional Committee of the Communist Party of the Soviet Union =

The First Secretary of the Dagestan regional branch of the Communist Party of the Soviet Union was the position of highest authority in the Dagestan ASSR in the Russian SFSR of the Soviet Union. The position was created on February 16, 1919, and abolished in August 1991. The First Secretary was a de facto appointed position usually by the Politburo or the General Secretary himself.

== List of First Secretaries of the Communist Party of Dagestan ==
| Name | Term of Office | | Life years |
| Name | Start | End | Life years |
First Secretaries of the Communist Party
| Ullu-biy Buynaksky | February 16, 1919 | August 16, 1919 | 1890–1919 |
| Djelal ed-Din Korkmasov | September 4, 1919 | 1920 | 1877–1937 |
| Boris Sheboldayev | April 26, 1920 | December 6, 1920 | 1895–1937 |
| M. Korobkin | December 6, 1920 | January 5, 1921 | |
| Aleksandr Khavinson | January 5, 1921 | February 28, 1921 | 1897–1963 |
| Georgy Poleshko | March 12, 1921 | 1922 | 1890–1945 |
| Ibragim Aliyev | 1922 | 1922 | 1890–1938 |
| Aleksey Perimov | 1922 | January 1923 | 1897–1937 |
| Martemyan Ryutin | January 15, 1923 | February 1924 | 1890–1937 |
| Mussa Kundukhov | February 1924 | 1924 | 1890–1931 |
| Magomet Dalgat | 1924 | 1927 | 1893–1942 |
| Mikhail Granovsky | 1927 | 1928 | 1890–1941 |
| Aleksandr Muravyev | 1928 | August 1931 | 1894–1941 |
| Aron Tsekher | August 1931 | March 10, 1934 | 1895–1938 |
| Nazhmuddin Samursky (Efendyev) | March 10, 1934 | October 9, 1937 | 1891–1938 |
| Maksim Sorokin | October 9, 1937 | January 1939 | 1899–1965 |
| Nikolay Linkun | January 1939 | September 1942 | 1904–1977 |
| Aziz Aliev | September 27, 1942 | December 3, 1948 | 1897–1962 |
| Abdurrakhman Daniyalov | December 3, 1948 | November 29, 1967 | 1908–1981 |
| Magomet Umakhanov | November 29, 1967 | May 24, 1983 | 1918–1992 |
| Magomed Yusupov | May 24, 1983 | March 6, 1990 | 1935–2018 |
| Mukhu Aliyev | March 6, 1990 | August 1991 | 1940– |

== See also ==
- Dagestan Autonomous Soviet Socialist Republic

== Sources ==
- World Statesmen.org
