= Dagestan Autonomous Soviet Socialist Republic =

Autonomous republic in the Russian SFSR

Coordinates: 42.9833°N 47.4833°E

Dagestan Autonomous Soviet Socialist Republic Дагестанская АССР (Russian) جمهورية داغستان الاشتراكية السوفيتية ذاتية الحكم (Arabic) Дагъистаналъул АССР (Avar) Дагъыстан АССР (Kumyk) Дагъустандин АССР (Lezgian) Дагъусттаннал АССР (Lak) Дағыстан МССР (Azerbaijani) Дагъистан АССР (Dargwa) ДегӀастанан АССР (Chechen) Дагыстан АССР (Nogai) Дагъустан АССР (Tabassaran) Догъисту АССР (Muslim Tat)
- ASSR of the Russian SFSR; Republic of the Russian Federation
- 1921–1992
- Flag (1954–1991) Emblem (1978–1994)

- Map of the Dagestan ASSR in European Soviet Union, the same territory as the actual Republic of Dagestan ASSR
- Capital: Mahachkala
- Area
  - Coordinates
  - Type: Soviet republic
- History
  - Established: 20 January 1921
  - Sovereignty declared (Renamed to the Dagestan SSR): 13 May 1991
  - Renamed to the Republic of Dagestan: 30 July 1992
Preceded by	Succeeded by
Dagestan Oblast; Grozny Oblast	Dagestan

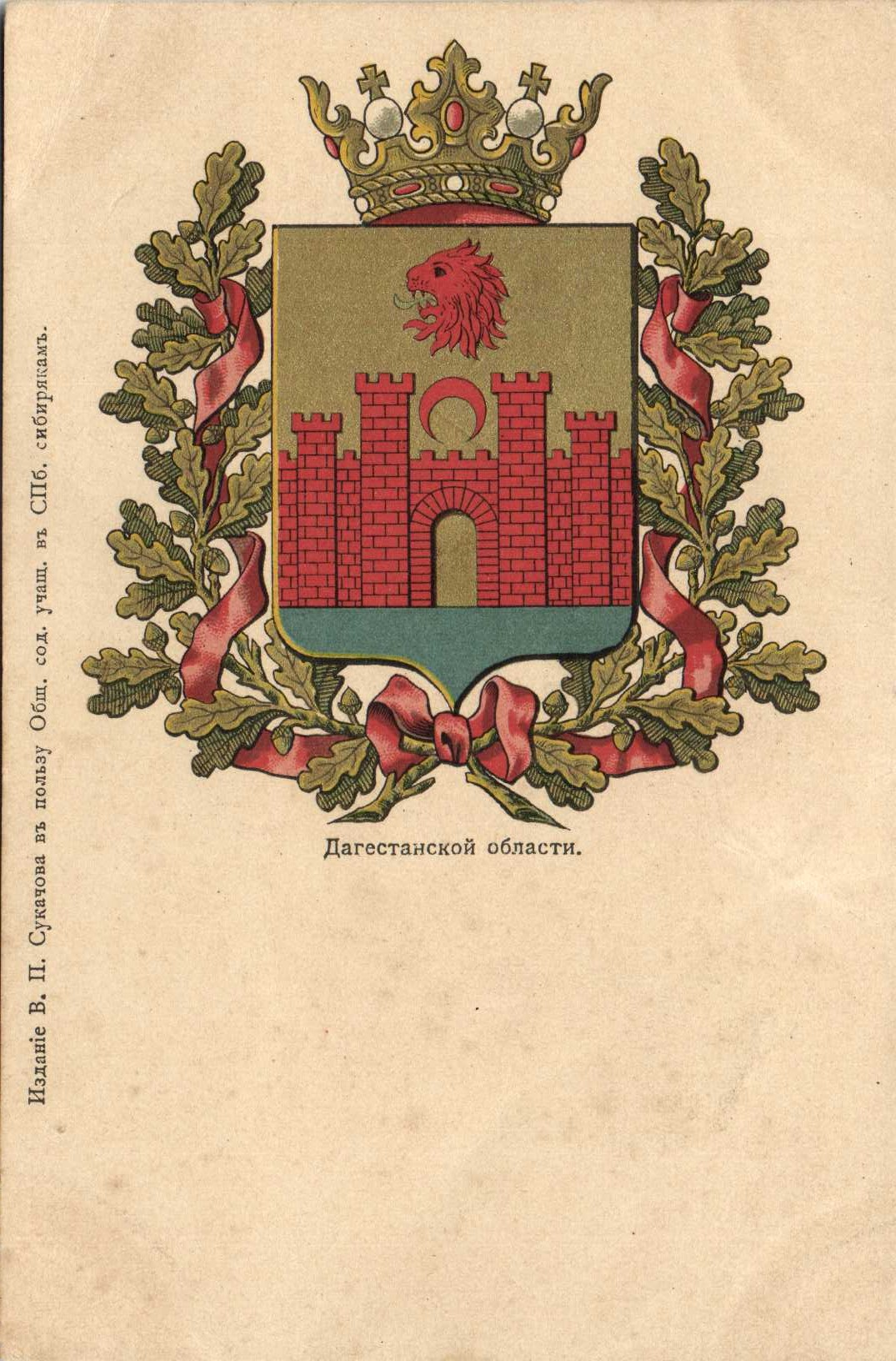
Dagestan's Tsarist era coat of arms

The Dagestan Autonomous Soviet Socialist Republic (Note: Russian: Дагестанская Автономная Советская Социалистическая Республика Arabic: جمهورية داغستان الاشتراكية السوفيتية ذاتية الحكم Avar: Дагъистаналъул Автономияб Советияб Социалистияб Жумгьурият Azerbaijani: Дағыстан Мухтар Совет Сосиалист Республикасы Kumyk: Дагъыстан Автономиялы Советни Социалистни Республика Lezgian: Дагъустандин Советрин Социализмдин Автономиядин Республика) (1921–1991), abbreviated as Dagestan ASSR (Note: Russian: Дагестанская АССР; Avar: Дагъистаналъул АССР; Kumyk: Дагъыстан АССР; Lezgian: Дагъустандин АССР; Lak: Дагъусттаннал АССР; Azerbaijani: Дағыстан МССР; Aghul: Дагъустан АССР; Chechen: ДегӀастанан АССР; Nogai: Дагыстан АССР) or DASSR (Note: Russian: ДАССР) and also unofficially known as Soviet Dagestan or just simply Dagestan, was an autonomous republic of the Russian SFSR within the Soviet Union. This "Land of Mountains" was known also for having a "mountain of peoples," with more than thirty ethnic groups indigenous to the territory. This region was absorbed in to the Russian Empire in 1813 after the signing of the Treaty of Gulistan, and subsequently became a breeding ground for early revolutionary fervor in the Russian Revolution due its people's discontent with being part of the empire.

Although as part of its strategy to promote local languages and to discourage pan-Turkic and pan-Islamic movements, a half-dozen of these ethnicities were provided with schooling in their native language. At some point in Soviet history, Russian became the most widespread second language and gradually the lingua franca, especially in urban areas.

The minor planet 2297 Dagestan, discovered in 1978 by Soviet astronomer Nikolai Chernykh, is named after the Dagestan ASSR.

== Geographical characteristics ==
Dagestan is divided into five different topographical regions of varying natural features. The furthest south is the region dominated by the Caucasus Mountains. This region contains Dagestan's highest point, Mount Bazardüzü, at 14,652 ft or 4,466 m. This region is somewhat arid and rainfall is scarce. However, it is home to many rivers which cut through the Caucasus Mountains such as the Sulak River or the Samur river. The second region is north of the mountains, and largely consists of forested hills rising to around 2000–3000 ft or 600–900 m. This region receives around 25 in or 63 cm of rain annually, this allows for a more useful soil than in the arid mountainous region. The third region is the coastal plain found in between the Caucasus Mountains and the Caspian Sea. This region contains rich deposits of oil and natural gas. The fourth region is made up of the swampy plain around the Terek River and its delta on the coast of the Caspian Sea. The fifth region of Dagestan is the semi-arid plain north of the Terek River. This region receives around 8–10 in or 20–25 cm of rain per year, so vegetation as a whole is more scarce in this region when compared to other parts of Dagestan. This northern dry region of Dagestan is part of the greater Nogai Steppe region of Russia.

== Pre-Soviet history ==
Due to the harsh nature of Dagestan's climate, any available fertile soil was used for agriculture. Cattle herding was also common. Only 15% of Dagestan's land is usable for agriculture, so Dagestan's own agricultural output was often not enough to sustain its population. The region became reliant on trade with Chechnya and Georgia to prevent starvation. Changes in agricultural practices during the 18th and early 19th century caused a migratory crisis within Dagestan due to shifting norms of where different people resided within Dagestan.

Before the Soviet era, identity in the region of Dagestan largely centered around clans and religion, rather than ethnicity or "nationhood" in the Soviet context. However, due to the diverse nature of Dagestan, social structures varied widely between people groups.

Dagestani society was divided up in to socio-organizational units known as Jama'ats before Russian conquest. Jama'ats first originated in Dagestan between the fourteenth and fifteenth centuries, and they consisted of a well protected villages surrounded by agricultural fields. A Jama'at was divided further in to clans which were known as Tukkhums. Expulsion from one's Jama'at or Tukkhum was seen as a fate equivalent to death. The existence of Jama'ats as the main socio-organizational structure in Dagestan began to fade due to pressure both from rising Russian colonial presence in the region as well as internal economic and environmental causes.

Dagestan was formally incorporated into the Russian Empire in 1813 with the signing of the Gulistan Peace Treaty. However, Russia's interests in Dagestan began in 1722 with the Russo-Persian War led by Peter the Great. Imam Shamil was one of Dagestan's first resistance leaders against Russian imperialism. Shamil was born in 1797 to a prominent Avar warlord, and he came of age during the first years of full Russian control of Dagestan. Shamil acted as a charismatic political leader as well as a religious one in his efforts to unite the diverse peoples of Dagestan who did not have a history of working together before the Russian conquest. Through his ability to create unity among the various peoples of Dagestan, he was able to successfully conduct over two decades of Guerilla warfare against the Tsarist Russian army.

Tsarist Russia spent decades in its conquest of the Caucasus region and the Caucasian War would not come to a full end until 1859.

After the 1877 Dagestani uprising, the Tsarist government deported many Dagestanis to the Russian Interior as a collective punishment.

== Revolution era ==
The Tsarist Russian government often sent Cossacks and ethnically Russian settlers to pacify the peoples of Dagestan and other regions in the North Caucasus, however this often had the opposite effect. Cossacks and Russian land owners received the most arable land in the region, leaving indigenous Dagestani farmers with less available land in an already competitive region in regards to agriculture. This put a large wedge in to the relationship between the native peoples of Dagestan and the new Russian settlers.

Discontent with the Tsarist government grew after the Russian governor Illarion Vorontsov-Dashkov attempted to instate the Russian language as the language of administration in rural Dagestan. This culminated in around 6,000 Dagestani protestors marching on the then local capital of Temir-Khan-Shurinsky to show their discontent in 1914, mere weeks before the beginning of World War One.

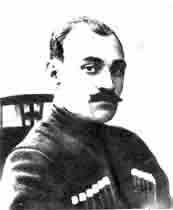
Early Dagestani Bolshevik Said Gabiev

Early Dagestani Bolshevik, Said Gabiyev, was born to a Dagestani family who had suffered from deportation to the Russian Interior after an 1877 Dagestani uprising. Although his family was allowed to return to Dagestan, Gabiyev was familiar with his family's stories of suffering at the hand of the Tsarist government. He was further radicalized by his secular education at the Stavropol Gymnasium. After his graduation, he moved to Saint Petersburg, where he began writing a paper known as The Dawn of Dagestan. This paper was written not only in Russian, but in the Dagestani languages of Lak and Lezgin. Ullu-biy Buynaksky was another Dagestani Bolshevik radicalized by secular education. Although originally from Dagestan, he received his education at Moscow University. Both Gabiev and Buinaskii quickly fell in with the rising Bolshevik underground in their respective cities, and would both eventually become pivotal members of their own local revolutionary movements. Due to this, they were often on the run from Tsarist authorities, and would relocate as need be to avoid arrest.

== Early Soviet era ==
The capital of Dagestan, Makhachkala, was originally named Port-Petrovsk during the Tsarist period. However, during the early Soviet period in 1921 it was renamed to Makhachkala.

The 1917 revolution and Russian Civil War brought many Dagestani Bolsheviks who had studied in the big cities of the Russian empire back home, including Gabiyev and Buynaksky. This would lead to Buinaskii's death in 1919 as a result of participation in the civil war.

The Soviet government promoted secular education, meaning the traditionally Islamic education which prevailed in Dagestan was under threat. Beginning in 1938, Russian language instruction in non-Russian language schools became mandatory. Education in Russian and titular languages was mandatory, but in a region as diverse as Dagestan not all languages were taught and many Indigenous Dagestani languages were left with fewer speakers.

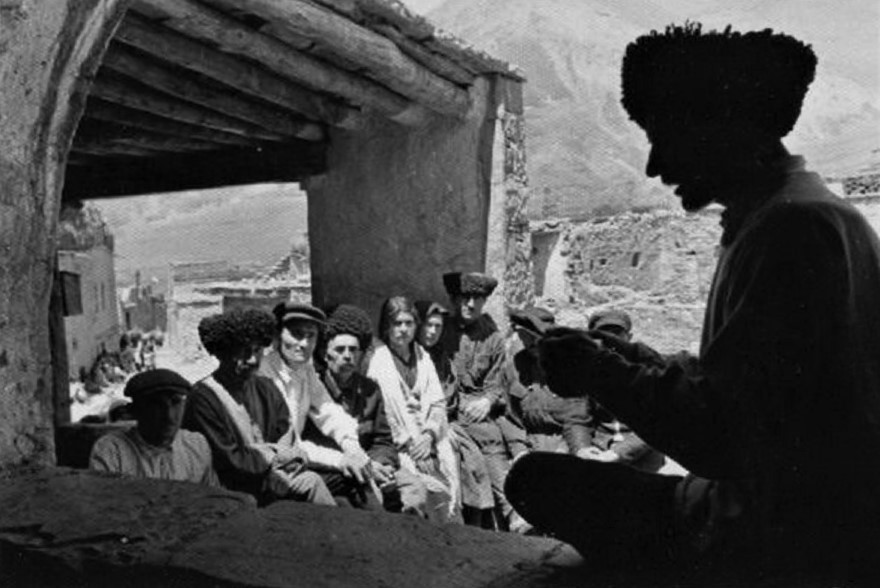
A Quran reciter in an aul in the mountains of Dagestan, 1936

The early Soviet period in Dagestan not only saw forced secularization from the outside at the hands of the Soviet government, but also internally led by homegrown secular Dagestani Islamic scholars. Ali al-Ghumuqi was a Cairo-educated Dagestani Islamic leader who became a prominent figure in early Soviet Dagestan. Al-Ghumuqi's role as a reformer began from 1913 to 1916 when he edited a newspaper known as The Rose of Dagestan, which promoted religious and political reform inside of Dagestan. After the 1917 Revolution and Russian Civil War, he was in charge of a madrasa in his home village of Kumukh. His school provided education in Islamic religious studies, as well as different secular fields of science and math, instruction was also carried out in the Lak language. Although he was initially protected from the purges of the Stalin era due to his place as a chairman on a Soviet sharia court, he was eventually arrested and deported to Kazakhstan, where he would spend the remaining years of his life. Arabic, the lingua franca of Dagestan at the time, remained the primary official language until collectivisation.

== Late Soviet era ==
Migrations and social changes forced on the indigenous ethnic groups of Dagestan oftentimes led to conflict among these groups. Ethnic Kumyks originated in the plains region of Dagestan and were largely more secular due to Soviet Atheist influence, however due to forced displacement of many of the traditionally mountainous and more strictly Islamic Avar people, conflict began to arise. Initially, contact with the Avar drew many Kumyk towards the interpretation of Islam practiced by them. However, ethnic conflict began to arise during the late Soviet period when the economy began to worsen. This culminated in some Kumyk developing their own strict Wahabist interpretation of Islam. This conflicted with the Avar interpretation of Islam, which was now seen in the eyes of many Kumyk as too "Sovietized."

== Demographics ==
Dagestan is home to many indigenous Northern Caucasian ethnic groups, such as the Avar, Dargin, Lezgin, and other groups such as the Kumyk, Nogai, and Azeri. The largest ethnic group in Dagestan, the Avar, are divided into about 15 subgroups. There are also many ethnic Russians in this region who arrived after the era of Russian conquest. The predominant religion of Dagestan is Sunni Islam, however there is also a minority of Russian Orthodox Christians. Although Dagestan was one of the most religious regions of the Soviet Union, state atheism was enforced in Dagestan, as well as the other North Caucasus republics of the Soviet Union.

The largest cities in Dagestan are the capital of Makhachkala, as well as Derbent, Kizlyar, Buynaksk, and Izberbash.

== Gallery ==
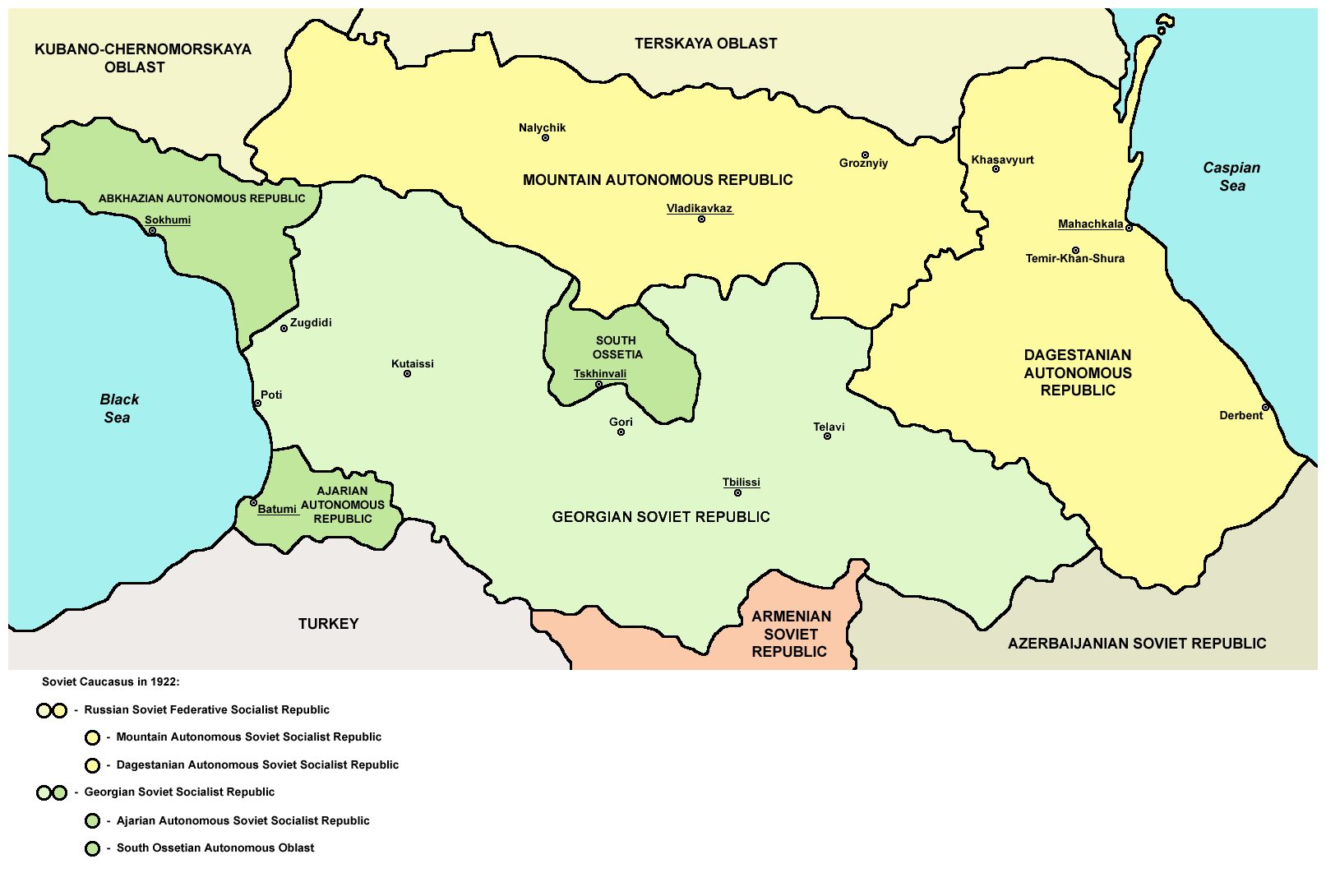
Map of the Dagestan ASSR and other ASSR in Caucasus region in 1922

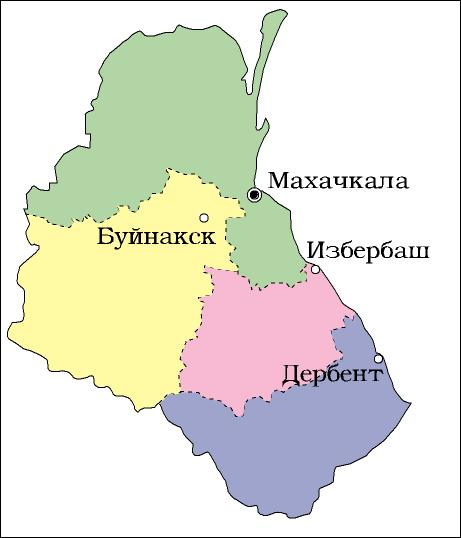
Map of the Dagestan ASSR in 1953

Map of the Dagestan ASSR and other ASSR in Caucasus region

== See also ==
- Republic of Dagestan
- List of leaders of the Dagestan ASSR
  - Dagestan Regional Committee of the Communist Party of the Soviet Union
- Flag of the Dagestan Autonomous Soviet Socialist Republic
