= Kaytago-Tabasaranskiy okrug =

Coordinates: 42°07′29″N 47°50′00″E

Kaitago-Tabasaranskiy okrug Кайтаго-Табасаранский округ
- Okrug
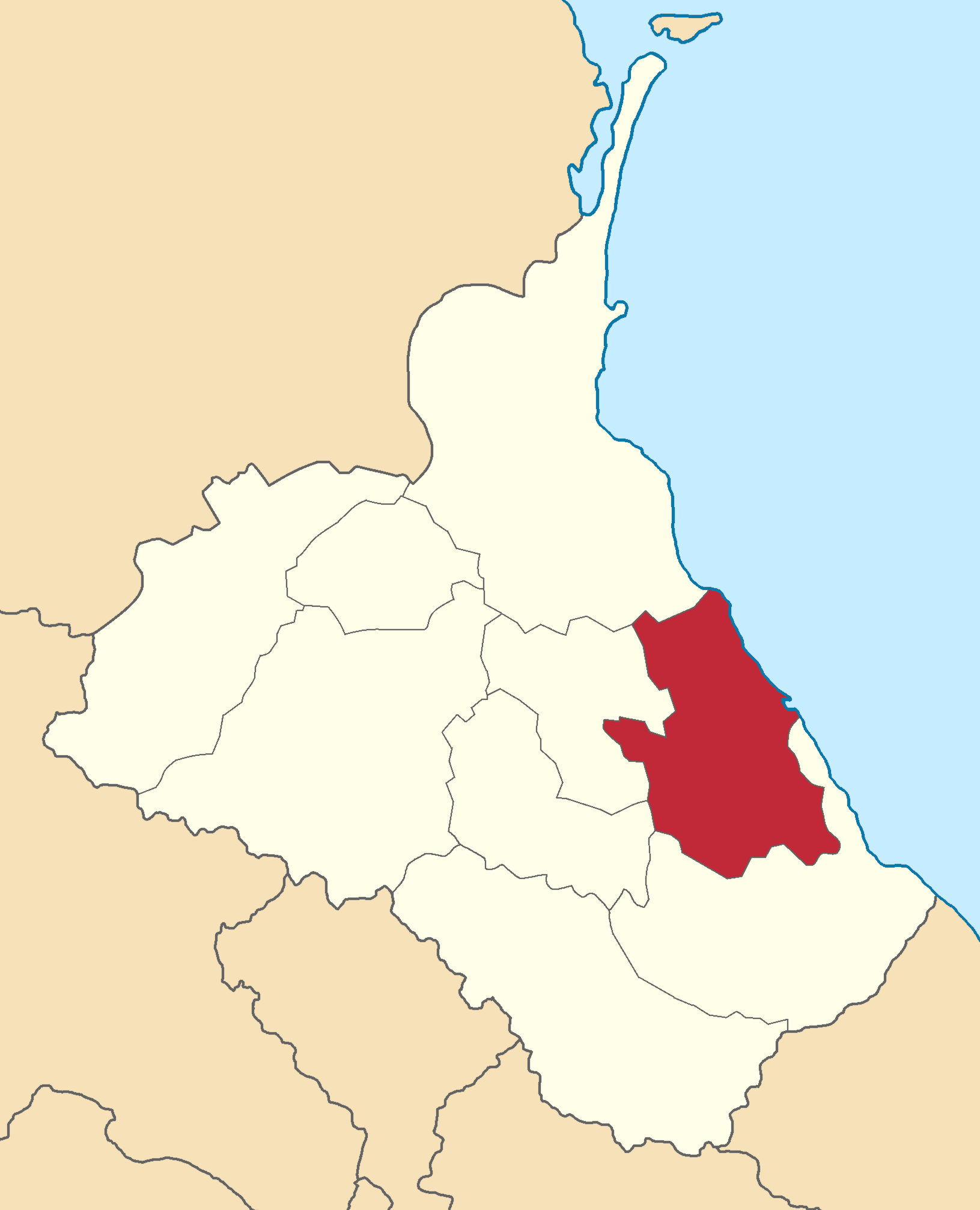
- Location in the Dagestan Oblast
- Country: Russian Empire
- Viceroyalty: Caucasus
- Oblast: Dagestan
- Established: 1860
- Abolished: 1928
- Capital: Madzhalis

Area
  - Total: 3,296.44 km^{2} (1,272.76 sq mi)

Population (1916)
  - Total: 82,154
  - Density: 24.922/km^{2} (64.548/sq mi)
  - Urban: 27.50%
  - Rural: 72.50%

The Kaytago-Tabasaranskiy okrug (Note: Russian: Кайтаго-Табасаранский округ, pre-reform orthography: Кайтаго-Табасаранскій округъ [kɐjˈtaɡə təbəsɐˈranskʲɪ ˈokrʊk]) was a district (okrug) of the Dagestan Oblast of the Caucasus Viceroyalty of the Russian Empire. The area of the Kaytago-Tabasaranskiy okrug is included in contemporary Dagestan of the Russian Federation. The district's administrative centre was Madzhalis.

== Administrative divisions ==
The prefectures (участки, uchastki) of the Kaytago-Tabasaranskiy okrug in 1917 were:

Name	1912 population	Area
Nizhne-Kaytagskiy prefecture (Нижне-Кайтагский участок)	20,147	1,151.50 square versts (1,310.48 km^{2}; 505.98 mi^{2})
Severo-Tabasaranskiy prefecture (Северо-Табасаранский участок)	26,481	977.86 square versts (1,112.87 km^{2}; 429.68 mi^{2})
Urkarakhskiy prefecture (Уркарахский участок)	32,474	767.18 square versts (873.10 km^{2}; 337.11 mi^{2})

== Demographics ==
=== Russian Empire Census ===
According to the Russian Empire Census, the Kaytago-Tabasaranskiy okrug had a population of 91,021 on 28 January [O.S. 15 January] 1897, including 48,284 men and 42,737 women. The plurality of the population indicated Dargin to be their mother tongue, with significant Tatar (Note: Before 1918, Azerbaijanis were generally known as "Tatars". This term, employed by the Russians, referred to Turkic-speaking Muslims of the South Caucasus. After 1918, with the establishment of the Azerbaijan Democratic Republic and "especially during the Soviet era", the Tatar group identified itself as "Azerbaijani".) and Kazikumukh speaking minorities.

Linguistic composition of the Kaytago-Tabasaranskiy okrug in 1897
Language	Native speakers	%
Dargin	33,186	36.46
Tatar	28,975	31.83
Kazi-Kumukh	17,678	19.42
Jewish	3,965	4.36
Russian	2,255	2.48
Kumyk	1,035	1.14
Ukrainian	790	0.87
Armenian	665	0.73
Avar-Andean	628	0.69
Tat	520	0.57
Polish	415	0.46
Kyurin	350	0.38
Lithuanian	249	0.27
Persian	86	0.09
German	52	0.06
Georgian	41	0.05
Belarusian	18	0.02
Nogai	1	0.00
Other	112	0.12
TOTAL	91,021	100.00

=== Kavkazskiy kalendar ===
According to the 1917 publication of Kavkazskiy kalendar, the Kaytago-Tabasaranskiy okrug had a population of 113,322 on 14 January [O.S. 1 January] 1916, including 61,849 men and 51,473 women, 98,837 of whom were the permanent population, and 14,485 were temporary residents:

Nationality	Urban		Rural		TOTAL	
Nationality	Number	%	Number	%	Number	%
North Caucasians	5,138	16.48	78,978	96.13	84,116	74.23
Russians	7,567	24.28	1,580	1.92	9,147	8.07
Jews	6,879	22.07	1,316	1.60	8,195	7.23
Shia Muslims (Note: Primarily Tatars.)	7,919	25.41	193	0.23	8,112	7.16
Armenians	2,604	8.35	37	0.05	2,641	2.33
Sunni Muslims (Note: Primarily Turco-Tatars.)	1,061	3.40	0	0.00	1,061	0.94
Other Europeans	0	0.00	50	0.06	50	0.04
TOTAL	31,168	100.00	82,154	100.00	113,322	100.00

== Bibliography ==
- Bournoutian, George A. (2018). Armenia and Imperial Decline: The Yerevan Province, 1900–1914. Milton Park, Abingdon, Oxon: Routledge. ISBN 978-1-351-06260-2. OCLC 1037283914.
- Hovannisian, Richard G. (1971). The Republic of Armenia. Vol. 1: The First Year, 1918–1919. Berkeley: University of California Press. ISBN 978-0520019843.
- Кавказский календарь на 1913 год [Caucasian calendar for 1913] (in Russian) (68th ed.). Tiflis: Tipografiya kantselyarii Ye.I.V. na Kavkaze, kazenny dom. 1913. Archived from the original on 19 April 2022.
- Кавказский календарь на 1917 год [Caucasian calendar for 1917] (in Russian) (72nd ed.). Tiflis: Tipografiya kantselyarii Ye.I.V. na Kavkaze, kazenny dom. 1917. Archived from the original on 4 November 2021.
- Tsutsiev, Arthur (2014). Atlas of the Ethno-Political History of the Caucasus (PDF). Translated by Nora Seligman Favorov. New Haven: Yale University Press. ISBN 9780300153088. Archived (PDF) from the original on 17 June 2023.
