= Boris Sheboldayev =

Soviet politician (1895–1937)

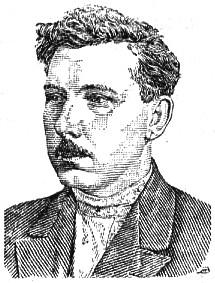
Boris Sheboldayev

Boris Petrovich Sheboldayev (Russian: Борис Петрович Шеболдаев) (27 May 1895 – 30 October 1937) was a Soviet party official who played a major in the forced collectivisation of Soviet agriculture, before falling a victim to the Great Purge.

== Career ==
Boris Sheboldayev was born in Paris, where his father was practising as a doctor. His family returned to St. Petersburg in 1900, In 1914, he joined the Bolsheviks. In 1916, he was drafted into the Russian as a medical orderly on the Caucasus front, where Russia was at war with Turkey. After the Bolshevik revolution in 1917, he served as a political commissar with the Red Army in Azerbaijan, until he was arrested in 1919 and deported to Dagestan. In 1920–25, he was a communist party official in Dagestan, Turkmenistan, and Tsaritsyn (Stalingrad/Volgograd). In 1925, he was transferred to Moscow to work for the communist party secretariat, headed by the General Secretary, Joseph Stalin. In May 1928, he was appointed secretary of the party committee in the newly created Lower Volga Nizhny-Volga territory, which included Saratov, its administrative centre, Stalingrad, and the Volga German republic.

Sheboldayev was one of the most enthusiastic supporters of Stalin's campaign to force Russian peasants to give up their private land and move to collective farming. Writing in Pravda in October 1929, he extolled the "tremendous uplift and enthusiasm" of in the newly formed collective farms, which had been achieved, he claimed, with the support of all but 5 to 10 per cent of the rural population, despite a campaign of sabotage by 142 former Tsarist army officers, kulaks (rich peasants) traders and priests. A government official who inspected the collective farms in the region in April 1930, reported on the "repulsive" conditions in which livestock were being kept, with "cows almost up to their knees in dung, horse not looked after properly .. pigs and poultry dying." Sheboldayev retorted that complaints like these only gave encouragement to the right wing opposition.

Shelboldayev was elected to the Central Committee in 1930. In 1931, he was appointed First Secretary of the North Caucasus Krai, a territory approximate the size of Germany, with a population of just over 10 million.

During the famine of 1932–33, caused by forced collectivization, communist officials met with armed resistance by peasants, and outside help was called in to help suppress it. On 12 November, Sheboldayev defended the principle of deporting entire villages, including peasants who were not guilty of defying soviet authority, because peasants "must answer for the condition of their neighbours." He singled out the Poltavskaya as an area where peasants were actively fight against Soviet forces. A month later, he gave the order for the entire population of 27,000 were to be deported.

In April 1933, the writer Mikhail Sholokhov wrote a 6,000 word letter to Stalin complaining about starvation and repression in his home district of Veshenskaya in North Causcasia, naming officials he considered to be responsible, including Sheboldayev, and pleading for 'genuine communists' to be posted to the area. As a result, extra food was sent to Veshenskaya, and the chairman of the local soviet, G.f.Ovchinnikov was sacked.

In January 1934, the North Caucasus territory was divided, and Sheboldayev was appointed First Secretary of the Azov-Black Sea Krai.

== Dismissal, and death ==
On 31 December 1936, near the start of the Great Purge, Sheboldayev was summoned in front of the Politburo, in Moscow, to explain why he had allowed a number of former supporters of the Left Opposition, such as Nikolai Glebov-Avilov and Alexander Beloborodov to hold jobs in the Azov Black-Sea, and why Ovchinnikov – who had worked with Sheboldayev in the Lower Volga region – had been appointed chairman of the Rostov city soviet after being removed from his former post, and why he had ignored warnings delivered to him by Stalin in person. On 6 January, Sheboldayev was sacked, after a Politburo member, Andrey Andreyev had been dispatched to Rostov to ensure that the local party committee was brought into line. He delivered a speech to the plenum at which he was sacked, admitting his 'errors' and saying that the decision was correct.

This show of contrition earned Sheboldayev a temporary reprieve, when he was given a lesser but still post as First Secretary of the Kursk provincial party committee, but he was arrested on 10 June 1937, and on 23 June, he was expelled from the Central Committee and from the communist party. Accused of being a member of a secret Trotskyist organization, he was sentenced to death on 30 October 1937, and shot the same day.

He was posthumously rehabilitated in 1956.

== Family ==
Sheboldayev's wife, Lydia Nikolayeva Smirnova, whom he married in 1920, was arrested and accused of conspiring with her husband. She denied the charge but was sentenced to death and shot. The couple had three sons, who were aged twelve, two and a half, and two months at the time of their mother's arrest.
