= Lazar Bicherakhov =

Russian army officer (1882–1952)

- Born: 15 November 1882; Saint Petersburg, Russian Empire
- Died: 22 June 1952 (aged 69); Ulm, Baden-Württemberg, West Germany
- Military career
- Allegiance: Russia; White Movement
- Branch: Russian Imperial Army; White Army
- Rank: Major General
- Conflicts: First World War; Persian Campaign; Caucasus campaign; Russian Civil War

Lazar Fedorovich Bicherakhov (Russian: Лазарь Фёдорович Бичерахов; Iron Ossetic: Бичерахты Федыры фырт Лазæр; 15 November 1882 – 22 June 1952) was a Russian army officer who participated in World War I and the Russian Civil War, as a member of the Imperial Russian and White Russian armies, respectively.

== Biography ==
Bicherakhov hailed from a Cossack family of Ossetian descent. He graduated from the real school in St. Petersburg and Alekseevsky military school in Moscow.

He served in the 1st Gorsko-Mozdok regiment of the Terek Cossack Host (1911–1914) of the 1st Caucasus Cossack Division, which had its headquarters in the town of Oltu, Kars Oblast. In 1912, L. Bicherakhov had the rank of sotnik.

During World War I, Bicherakhov served in 1915–1918 in the expeditionary corps of General Nikolai Baratov in Persia as the commander of the Terek Cossack detachment with the rank of army starshina. He was awarded the Order of St. Vladimir of the 4th degree.

In June 1918, Bicherakhov made an alliance in Bandar-e Anzali with British General Lionel Dunsterville to take joint action against Ottoman and Soviet forces in the Caucasus.

Since Dunsterville had no troops available for immediate deployment to prevent the advance of the Ottoman army, it was agreed to allow Bicherakhov to temporarily cooperate with the Bolsheviks. On 1 July 1918, by agreement with the leaders of the Baku Commune Bicherakhov arrived with a unit of 600 Cossacks to Baku to fight against the Islamic Army of the Caucasus under the command of Turkish general Nuri Pasha Killigil and the armed forces of Azerbaijan Democratic Republic in the battle of Baku. However, battlefield failures forced Bicherakhov to withdraw with his men to Petrovsk-Port. In October 1918, Bicherakhov declared allegiance to the Provisional All-Russian Government, and was conferred the rank of major-general in the White Army.

Bicherakhov emigrated in 1919 to the United Kingdom, and from there to Paris, France, where he stayed until World War II. He was in an extremely difficult position–after all, he was a general in the British Army, the army of the Reich's enemy in the war. To avoid being sent to a camp, the nearly 60-year-old Bicherakhov moved to Berlin.

At the end of the war, Lazar Bicherakhov moved south to the Alps with a group of fellow Caucasians. There, he was captured by the Americans. However, Lazar Bicherakhov was not handed over to the Soviet authorities, as he had not been found to have collaborated with the Nazis. He died in Germany and was buried in Ulm in 1952, shortly after being released from the American captivity.
