= Darginskiy okrug =

Coordinates: 42°25′53″N 47°19′25″E

Darginskiy okrug Даргинский округ
- Okrug
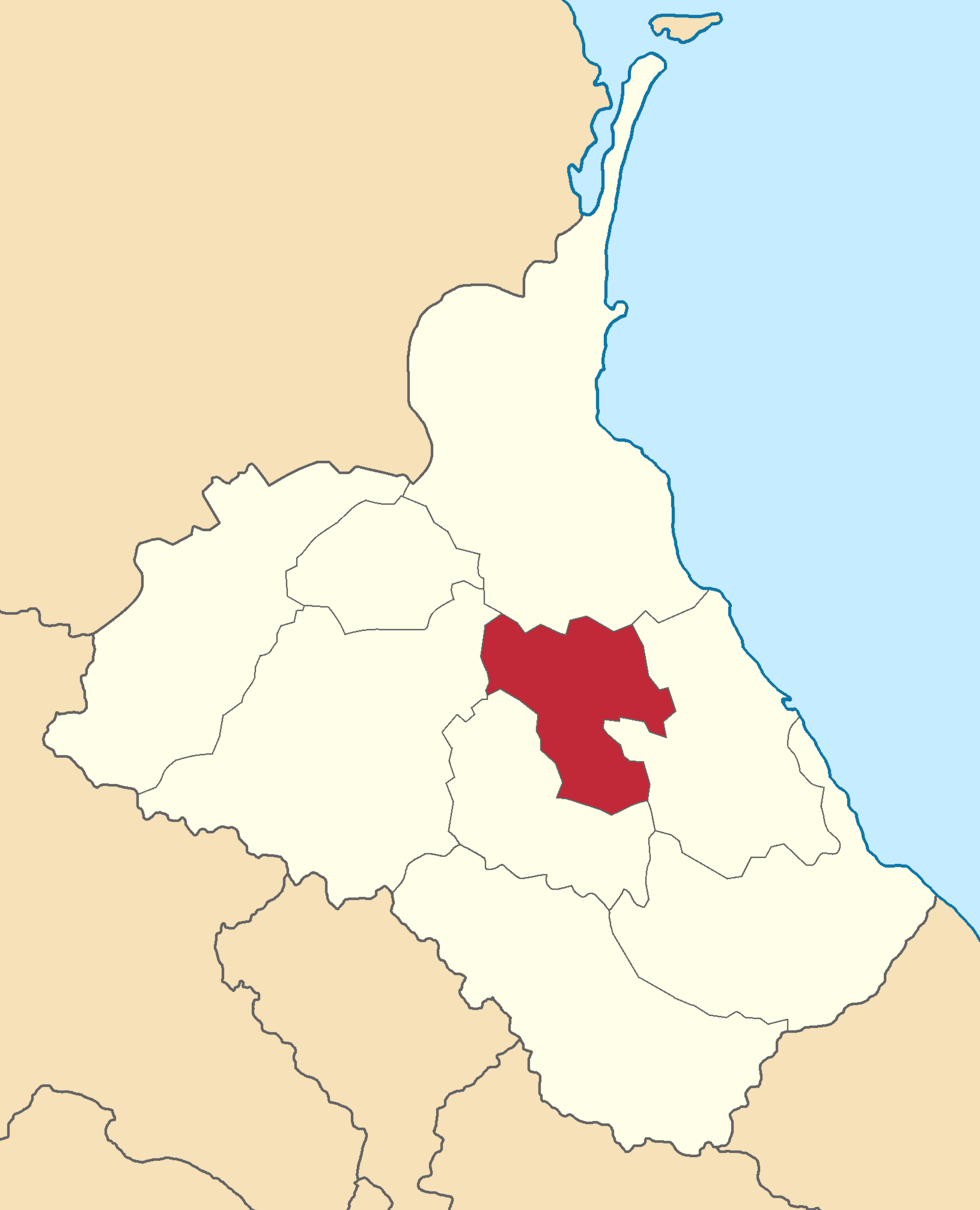
- Location in the Dagestan Oblast
- Country: Russian Empire
- Viceroyalty: Caucasus
- Oblast: Dagestan
- Established: 1854
- Abolished: 1928
- Capital: Levashi

Area
  - Total: 1,735.83 km^{2} (670.21 sq mi)

Population (1916)
  - Total: 85,131
  - Density: 49.043/km^{2} (127.02/sq mi)
  - Rural: 100.00%

The Darginskiy okrug (Note: Russian: Даргинский округ, pre-reform orthography: Даргинскій округъ [dərɡʲɪnskʲɪj ɐkrʊk]) was a district (okrug) of the Dagestan Oblast of the Caucasus Viceroyalty of the Russian Empire. The area of the Darginskiy okrug is included in contemporary Dagestan of the Russian Federation. The district's administrative centre was Levashi.

== Administrative divisions ==
The prefectures (участки, uchastki) of the Darginskiy okrug in 1917 were:

| Name | 1912 population | Area |
|---|---|---|
| Akushinskiy prefecture (Акушиинский участок) | 30,280 | 517.05 square versts (588.44 km^{2}; 227.20 mi^{2}) |
| Mekeginskiy prefecture (Мекегинский участок) | 22,235 | 403.49 square versts (459.20 km^{2}; 177.30 mi^{2}) |
| Syurginskiy prefecture (Сюргинский участок) | 17,175 | 291.51 square versts (331.76 km^{2}; 128.09 mi^{2}) |
| Tsudakharskiy prefecture (Цудахарский участок) | 11,060 | 313.54 square versts (356.83 km^{2}; 137.77 mi^{2}) |

== Demographics ==
=== Russian Empire Census ===
According to the Russian Empire Census, the Darginskiy okrug had a population of 80,943 on 28 January [O.S. 15 January] 1897, including 38,403 men and 42,540 women. The majority of the population indicated Dargin to be their mother tongue.

Linguistic composition of the Darginskiy okrug in 1897
| Language | Native speakers | % |
|---|---|---|
| Dargin | 73,899 | 91.30 |
| Kazi-Kumukh | 3,739 | 4.62 |
| Avar-Andean | 3,131 | 3.87 |
| Russian | 57 | 0.07 |
| Polish | 29 | 0.04 |
| Georgian | 20 | 0.02 |
| Jewish | 19 | 0.02 |
| Ukrainian | 15 | 0.02 |
| Kyurin | 9 | 0.01 |
| Tatar (Note: Before 1918, Azerbaijanis were generally known as "Tatars". This term, employed by the Russians, referred to Turkic-speaking Muslims of the South Caucasus. After 1918, with the establishment of the Azerbaijan Democratic Republic and "especially during the Soviet era", the Tatar group identified itself as "Azerbaijani".) | 8 | 0.01 |
| Lithuanian | 2 | 0.00 |
| Armenian | 1 | 0.00 |
| German | 1 | 0.00 |
| Other | 13 | 0.02 |
| TOTAL | 80,943 | 100.00 |

=== Kavkazskiy kalendar ===
According to the 1917 publication of Kavkazskiy kalendar, the Darginskiy okrug had a population of 85,131 on 14 January [O.S. 1 January] 1916, including 42,156 men and 42,975 women, 85,020 of whom were the permanent population, and 111 were temporary residents:

| Nationality | Number | % |
|---|---|---|
| North Caucasians | 85,108 | 99.97 |
| Russians | 23 | 0.03 |
| TOTAL | 85,131 | 100.00 |

== Bibliography ==
- Bournoutian, George A. (2018). Armenia and Imperial Decline: The Yerevan Province, 1900–1914. Milton Park, Abingdon, Oxon: Routledge. ISBN 978-1-351-06260-2. OCLC 1037283914.
- Кавказский календарь на 1913 год [Caucasian calendar for 1913] (in Russian) (68th ed.). Tiflis: Tipografiya kantselyarii Ye.I.V. na Kavkaze, kazenny dom. 1913. Archived from the original on 19 April 2022.
- Кавказский календарь на 1917 год [Caucasian calendar for 1917] (in Russian) (72nd ed.). Tiflis: Tipografiya kantselyarii Ye.I.V. na Kavkaze, kazenny dom. 1917. Archived from the original on 4 November 2021.
- Tsutsiev, Arthur (2014). Atlas of the Ethno-Political History of the Caucasus (PDF). Translated by Nora Seligman Favorov. New Haven: Yale University Press. ISBN 9780300153088. Archived (PDF) from the original on 17 June 2023.
