= Temir-Khan-Shurinskiy okrug =

Coordinates: 42°49′N 47°07′E

Temir-Khan-Shurinskiy okrug Темир-Хан-Шуринский округ
- Okrug
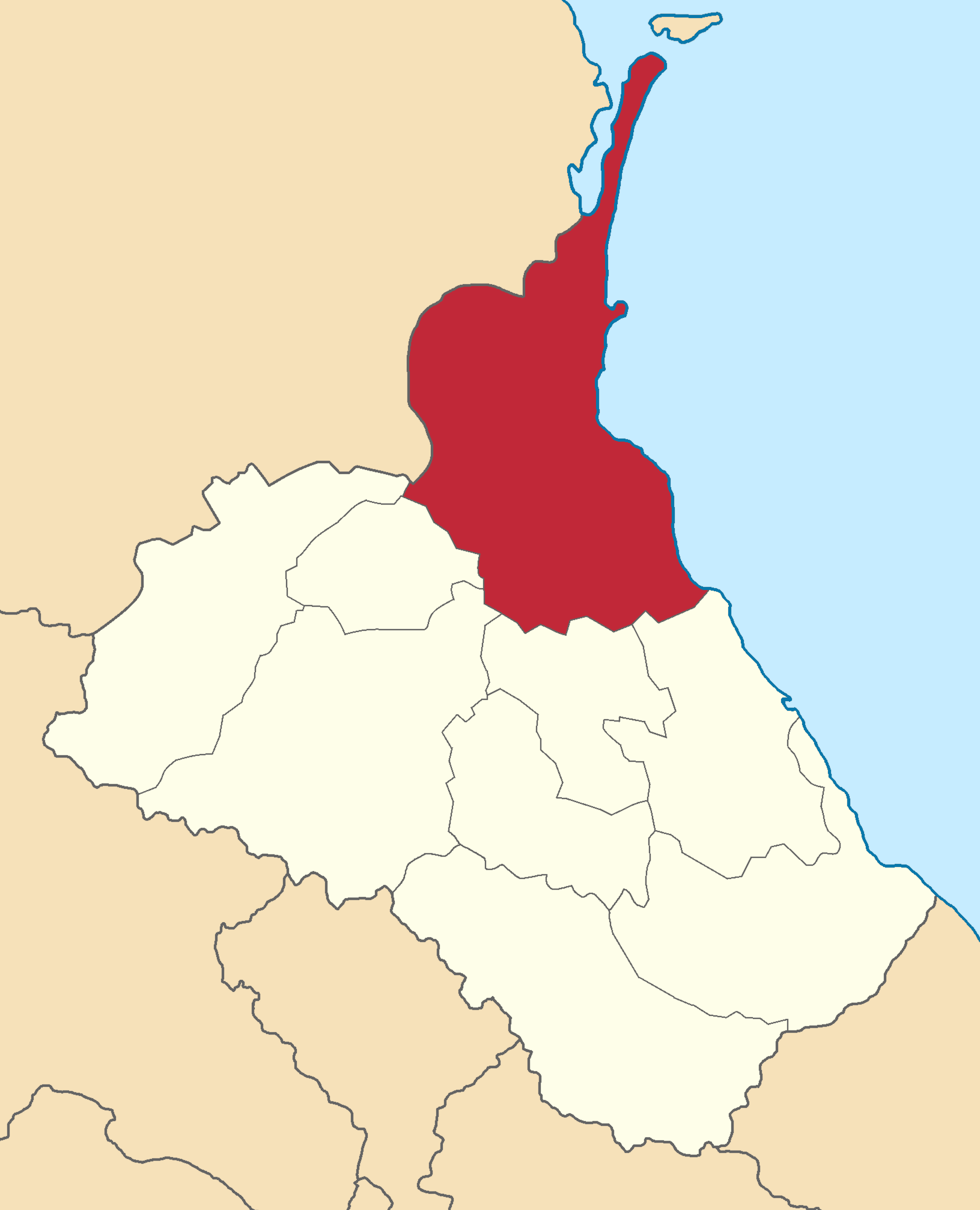
- Location in the Dagestan Oblast
- Country: Russian Empire
- Viceroyalty: Caucasus
- Oblast: Dagestan
- Established: 1867
- Abolished: 1922
- Capital: Temir-Khan-Shura (present-day Buynaksk)

Area
  - Total: 6,218.38 km^{2} (2,400.93 sq mi)

Population (1916)
  - Total: 136,234
  - Density: 21.9083/km^{2} (56.7422/sq mi)
  - Urban: 28.48%
  - Rural: 71.52%

The Temir-Khan-Shurinskiy okrug (Note: Russian: Темир-Хан-Шуринский округ, pre-reform orthography: Темир-Хан-Шуринскій округъ [tʲɪmʲɪr xan ʂʊrʲɪnskʲɪj ɐkrʊk]) was a district (okrug) of the Dagestan Oblast of the Caucasus Viceroyalty of the Russian Empire. The area of the Temir-Khan-Shurinskiy okrug is included in contemporary Dagestan of the Russian Federation. The district's administrative centre was Temir-Khan-Shura (present-day Buynaksk).

== Administrative divisions ==
The prefectures (участки, uchastki) of the Temir-Khan-Shurinskiy okrug in 1917 were:

Name	1912 population	Area
Dzhengutayevskiy prefecture (Дженгутаевский участок)	33,330	720.86 square versts (820.38 km^{2}; 316.75 mi^{2})
Tarkinskiy prefecture (Таркинский участок)	9,842	1,866.78 square versts (2,124.51 km^{2}; 820.28 mi^{2})
Temir-Khan-Shurinskiy prefecture (Темир-Хан-Шуринский участок)	23,174	1,134.87 square versts (1,291.55 km^{2}; 498.67 mi^{2})
Chir-Yurtovskiy prefecture (Чиръ-Юртовский участок)	5,312	1,741.50 square versts (1,981.94 km^{2}; 765.23 mi^{2})
Tsrist. prom. Kut. (Црист. пром. Кут.)	1,613	–
Pom. N.-ka Tarkin. prefecture (Пом. Н.-ка Таркин. участок)	15,036	–

== Demographics ==
=== Russian Empire Census ===
According to the Russian Empire Census, the Temir-Khan-Shurinskiy okrug had a population of 97,348 on 28 January [O.S. 15 January] 1897, including 54,052 men and 43,296 women. The majority of the population indicated Kumyk to be their mother tongue, with significant Avar-Andean, Dargin, and Russian speaking minorities.

Linguistic composition of the Temir-Khan-Shurinskiy okrug in 1897
Language	Native speakers	%
Kumyk	49,730	51.08
Avar-Andean	15,194	15.61
Dargin	9,724	9.99
Russian	9,623	9.89
Jewish	2,787	2.86
Nogai	1,908	1.96
Ukrainian	1,750	1.80
Persian	1,631	1.68
Tatar (Note: Before 1918, Azerbaijanis were generally known as "Tatars". This term, employed by the Russians, referred to Turkic-speaking Muslims of the South Caucasus. After 1918, with the establishment of the Azerbaijan Democratic Republic and "especially during the Soviet era", the Tatar group identified itself as "Azerbaijani".)	1,261	1.30
Polish	1,024	1.05
Armenian	916	0.94
Kazi-Kumukh	588	0.60
Georgian	241	0.25
Lithuanian	234	0.24
German	189	0.19
Chechen	44	0.05
Belarusian	19	0.02
Kyurin	15	0.02
Tat	4	0.00
Other	466	0.48
TOTAL	97,348	100.00

=== Kavkazskiy kalendar ===
According to the 1917 publication of Kavkazskiy kalendar, the Temir-Khan-Shurinskiy okrug had a population of 136,234 on 14 January [O.S. 1 January] 1916, including 72,367 men and 63,867 women, 100,896 of whom were the permanent population, and 35,338 were temporary residents:

Nationality	Urban		Rural		TOTAL	
Nationality	Number	%	Number	%	Number	%
Sunni Muslims (Note: Primarily Turco-Tatars.)	76	0.20	90,840	93.24	90,916	66.74
Russians	19,478	50.19	5,522	5.67	25,000	18.35
North Caucasians	7,109	18.32	0	0.00	7,109	5.22
Jews	5,034	12.97	848	0.87	5,882	4.32
Shia Muslims (Note: Primarily Tatars.)	3,344	8.62	185	0.19	3,529	2.59
Armenians	2,064	5.32	22	0.02	2,086	1.53
Asiatic Christians	785	2.02	0	0.00	785	0.58
Other Europeans	736	1.90	12	0.01	748	0.55
Georgians	179	0.46	0	0.00	179	0.13
TOTAL	38,805	100.00	97,429	100.00	136,234	100.00

== Bibliography ==
- Bournoutian, George A. (2018). Armenia and Imperial Decline: The Yerevan Province, 1900–1914. Milton Park, Abingdon, Oxon: Routledge. ISBN 978-1-351-06260-2. OCLC 1037283914.
- Hovannisian, Richard G. (1971). The Republic of Armenia. Vol. 1: The First Year, 1918–1919. Berkeley: University of California Press. ISBN 978-0520019843.
- Кавказский календарь на 1913 год [Caucasian calendar for 1913] (in Russian) (68th ed.). Tiflis: Tipografiya kantselyarii Ye.I.V. na Kavkaze, kazenny dom. 1913. Archived from the original on 19 April 2022.
- Кавказский календарь на 1917 год [Caucasian calendar for 1917] (in Russian) (72nd ed.). Tiflis: Tipografiya kantselyarii Ye.I.V. na Kavkaze, kazenny dom. 1917. Archived from the original on 4 November 2021.
- Tsutsiev, Arthur (2014). Atlas of the Ethno-Political History of the Caucasus (PDF). Translated by Nora Seligman Favorov. New Haven: Yale University Press. ISBN 9780300153088. Archived (PDF) from the original on 17 June 2023.
