= Battle of Argvani =

Military action during Caucasian War

Coordinates: 42.4833°N 46.3444°E

- Part of the Murid War
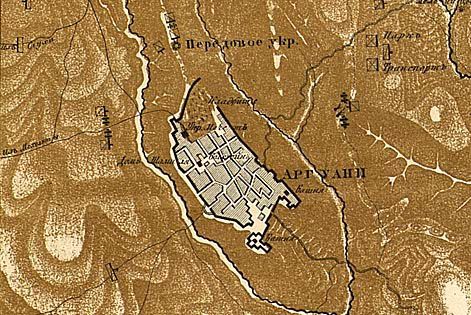
Date	30 May – 1 June 1839
Location	Argvani, Dagestan, Caucasian Imamate
Result	Russian victory

Belligerents
Russian Empire	Caucasian Imamate

Commanders and leaders
Pavel Grabbe; A. P. Pullo; I. M. Labyntsev	Imam Shamil; Hadjiyav Tlokh †; Abakar-Dibir †

Strength
8,300	2,900–4,000

Casualties and losses
646–2,000 killed or wounded	500 killed ~1,000 wounded or shell-shocked

The Battle of Argvani was a military engagement fought between the Caucasian Imamate and the Russian Empire. The battle was fought between the detachment of Separate Caucasian Corps (Russian forces) under the command of Lieutenant General Pavel Grabbe and the detachments of Imam Shamil. It happened on 31 May 1839 in the mountain village of Argvani.

== Background ==
In May 1839, the Russian command decided to inflict a crushing blow on the main stronghold of the imamate, the capital Akhulgo. Departing from Chechnya Grabbe's detachment made a dangerous journey to the fortress through the territories under Shamil's control over the course of a month. On the way to Akhulgo, the Grabbe detachment repeatedly fought with the highlanders, led by Imam Shamil. The largest battle on the outskirts of Akhulgo took place in the village of Argvani.

Throughout the winter and early spring, the imam drew the attention of Chechens, Salatavians and Dagestanis to the village of Arguani, foreseeing that the Russians would certainly move here, and managed to convince the highlanders to rally in order to prevent the further movement of the detachment. In the battle of Argvani against the Grabbe detachment, in addition to the inhabitants of the village, a detachment of Dagestanis and Chechens under the command of Shamil participated. Approximately from 2,900 to 4,000 from different free societies between the rivers Avar Koisu, Sulak, and Argun.

== Onslaught Start ==
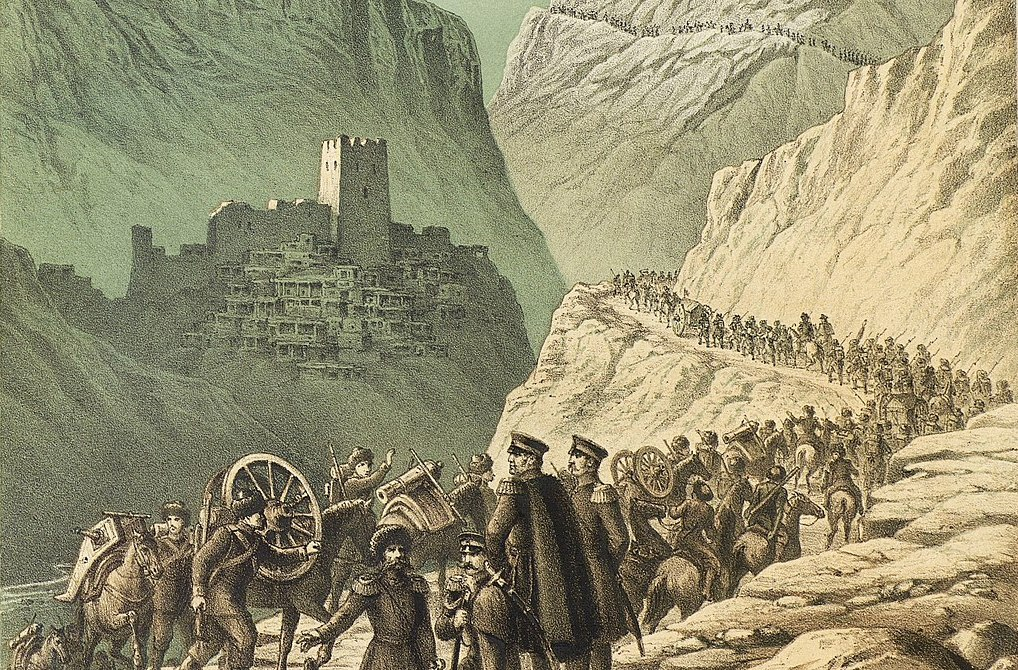
Expedition in the mountains in the Caucasus by A. P. Berge , (1874)

The constant rise over 12 versts exhausted the troops. It took two days until the development of the descent from the top of Suuk-Bulak to a small platform, which is one of the ledges of the southern slope of the ridge, continued. The road had to be carved into the rocks, the cliffs had to be torn with gunpowder.

On 30 May 1839, Russian troops approached the village of Argvani by noon. Shamil thoroughly fortified the village. The village itself consisted of 500 thick-walled stone houses located in six tiers along the slopes of the mountain. Each house was like a separate fortress that could not be taken without an assault. All streets were fortified with stone blockages. The aul itself had natural protection, any mistake when moving along narrow paths could cost a lot, falling into the abyss.

At 5 pm the battery opened heavy fire on the village. Neither mountain nor light guns could cause significant harm to the highlanders, closed by thick walls and cliffs. Cannonballs flew off the stone walls. The highlanders also opened well-aimed rifle fire from loopholes at the troops. At some distance from the village, a round fortification was built in the form of a low tower with loopholes. The 4th battalion of the Apsheron Regiment, despite the well-aimed shots of the highlanders and the difficulties of the approach, rushed with bayonets and quickly broke into the fortification, hand-to-hand combat ensued. Murids desperately resisted, and they all died there. But then the offensive was halted by a deep ditch. Both Absheron battalions suffered quite a big loss. The first day of the assault, despite the attempts of the Russian troops to break into the village before dark, was not crowned with success. The assault on Argvani was scheduled for the morning of 31 May.

== The course of the battle ==
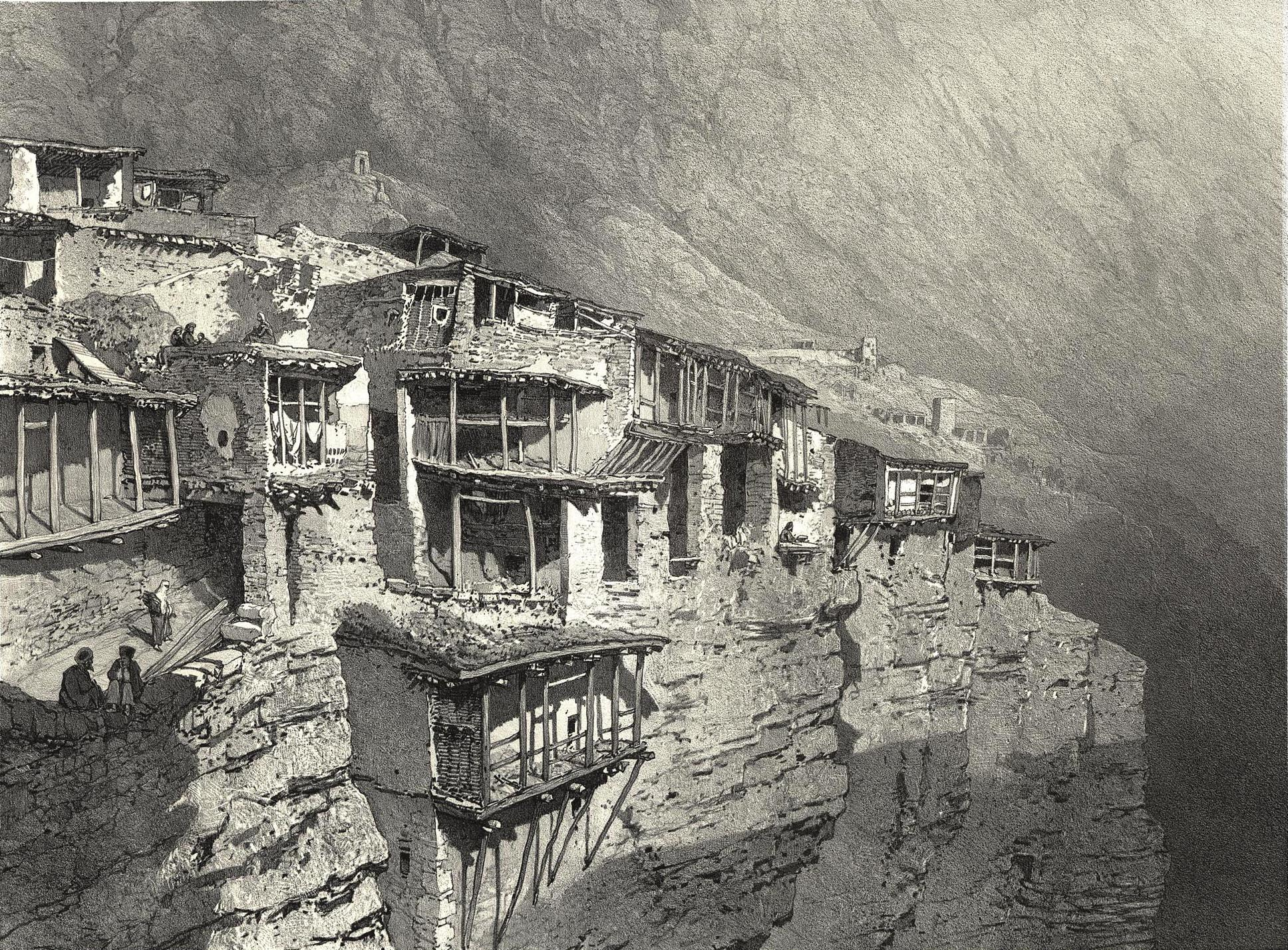
Village in the mountains of Dagestan by G. G. Gagarin, (1847)

At dawn, on a signal, all three columns with drumming moved to storm. In the right column of Colonel Labyntsev, two battalions (the 2nd Kabardian and the 2nd Kurinsky) rushed to the beam at a quick pace, descended into it and began to climb the steep ascent on all fours to the village itself, under deadly rifle fire from all the houses. At the same time, the 1st Kurinsky battalion with difficulty made its way down the left side of the stream and rushed to the front blockages, from which the enemy hit the assault columns from the flank. These blockages were defended by the most desperate murids, who decided to lay their lives here. The rapid movement of the columns showed the mountaineers that they could not be held back by the strongest fire, then the murids themselves rushed to the meeting of the columns with sabers and daggers in their hands and died under the blows of the bayonets of the forward teams. Some remained in hutches until their last breath, refusing all salvation, selling their lives dearly. Despite the desperate defense, Labyntsev's column broke into the village and occupied the front ranks of the hut, meanwhile, Colonel Pullo's column invaded from the other side. After that, a stubborn, hand-to-hand fight began in the village itself, in the streets and houses.

A participant in the assault, Count Dmitry Milyutin recalled:

Here for the first time I got into the very dump; every step forward has cost us many sacrifices; the narrow path was still embarrassed by the many wounded and killed, both ours and the enemy. However, ours nevertheless broke into the cemetery fence with the usual shout of “Hurrah” and began to climb onto the flat roofs of houses, from which the highlanders continued to shoot back. To our right, the same battle was in full swing in Labyntsev's column: and here the highlanders defended themselves desperately; some fanatics, jumping out of the rubble or houses, threw themselves into checkers towards the storming columns.

The most courageous murids, remaining in the village, decided to defend themselves to the last extreme. The location of the Dagestan auls is extremely convenient for defense: stone sacks of several floors, with flat roofs, are located one above the other, narrow winding streets sometimes pass through the gates of the towers, under canopies and galleries. Each saklya can serve as a blockhouse, each quarter as a citadel.

By 9 o’clock in the morning, the troops occupied most of the village, the flat roofs of those houses where the murids stubbornly defended themselves. However, the battle in Argvani continued all day until dark. There was no other way to force the highlanders out of the stone houses but to punch a hole in the roofs, throw in combustibles and set fire to the beams. Despite this, the murids remained for several hours in the house, sometimes they managed to break through their exits and hide through hidden messages from one sakli to another, but many bodies were found charred. For all their disadvantageous position, the highlanders managed to inflict a lot of harm on the troops. With swords and daggers, they fought back one by one until they died on bayonets, while some murids rushed at dozens of soldiers without any weapons. Only 15 people, suffocating inside one hut from smoke and hand grenades thrown there, agreed to surrender. Many soldiers died from their own negligence, rushing into the inside of the hut, there were no fewer casualties from the enemy, the streets were littered with corpses.

=== Completion of the assault ===
By the end of the day, a significant part of Argvani still remained in the hands of the Murids, in particular, a tower of several tiers on the eastern tip of the village cost a bloody battle, where all the efforts of the assault teams were in vain. By evening, they managed to drag two mountain and two Cossack guns into the village and put them on the roofs of the nearest houses in order to make a breach in the tower. In spite of everything, the highlanders did not give up, at night they took the most stringent measures to completely encircle the village, especially those huts in which the enemy was still. At night, the surviving murids began to leave Argvani, some of them engaged in hand-to-hand combat with the chains of rangers, others in the dark, by negligence, fell off the cliffs into a precipice. Few managed to leave the village.

The assault began at 4 pm on 30 May and continued until dawn on 1 June, resulting in 36 hours of uninterrupted fighting. "A gigantic battle, " Grabbe notes in his diary, "this thunderous blow will long be remembered in the mountains, hundreds of bodies converged in our hands, except for those taken away according to custom. 25 people were taken prisoner, our damage is great...

=== Losses ===
Official Russian data 146 killed (including 6 officers) and 500 wounded (including 30 officers), General A. I. Panteleev was seriously wounded.

According to other sources, more than 2,000 thousand soldiers were out of action in the Grabbe detachment, killed and wounded. The losses incurred at Argvani forced Grabbe to turn to General E. Golovin with a request to send reinforcements from the Samur detachment (three battalions).

According to the military historian L. A. Boguslavsky, 500 Murids were killed and 1,500 people were wounded in this battle.

== Effects ==
After the capture of Argvani, the troops continued to move through Chirkata to the capital of the imamate Akhulgo. After an 80-day siege, the Akhulgo fortress fell. Shamil with close murids went to Chechnya.

== See also ==
- Siege of Akhoulgo
