= Shabdukh =

Shabdukh Шабдух Шабдухъ
- Selo
- Location within Republic of Dagestan Location within Russia
- Coordinates: 42°45′N 46°25′E
- Country: Russia
- Region: Republic of Dagestan
- District: Gumbetovsky District
- Time zone: UTC+3:00

Shabdukh (Russian: Шабдух; Avar: Шабдухъ) is a rural locality (a selo) and the administrative centre of Tsudni-Shabdukhsky Selsoviet, Gumbetovsky District, Republic of Dagestan, Russia. The population was 143 as of 2010. There are 5 streets.

== Geography ==
Shabdukh is located 16 km southwest of Mekhelta (the district's administrative centre) by road. Tsundi and Ichichali are the nearest rural localities.
