= Tsundi =

Tsundi Цунди
- Selo
- Location within Republic of Dagestan Location within Russia
- Coordinates: 42°44′N 46°26′E
- Country: Russia
- Region: Republic of Dagestan
- District: Gumbetovsky District
- Time zone: UTC+3:00

Tsundi (Russian: Цунди) is a rural locality (a selo) in Tsudni-Shabdukhsky Selsoviet, Gumbetovsky District, Republic of Dagestan, Russia. The population was 368 as of 2010.

== Geography ==
Tsundi is located 14 km southwest of Mekhelta (the district's administrative centre) by road. Shabdukh and Kizhani are the nearest rural localities.
