= Tlyarata =

Tlyarata is the name of several rural localities in Russia:

- Tlyarata, Gumbetovsky District, Republic of Dagestan, a selo in Gumbetovsky District of the Republic of Dagestan
- Tlyarata, Tlyaratinsky District, Republic of Dagestan, a selo in Tlyaratinsky District of the Republic of Dagestan
