= Novoye Argvani =

Novoye Argvani Новое Аргвани Садуб / ЦӀияб Аргъвани
- Selo
- Location within Republic of Dagestan Location within Russia
- Coordinates: 42°46′N 46°36′E
- Country: Russia
- Region: Republic of Dagestan
- District: Gumbetovsky District
- Time zone: UTC+3:00

Novoye Argvani (Russian: Новое Аргвани; Avar: Садуб / ЦӀияб Аргъвани) is a rural locality (a selo) in Argvaninsky Selsoviet, Gumbetovsky District, Republic of Dagestan, Russia. The population was 1,643 as of 2010. There are 28 streets.

== Geography ==
Novoye Argvani is located 23 km east of Mekhelta (the district's administrative centre) by road. Argvani and Gadari are the nearest rural localities.
