= Tantari =

Tantari Тантари Лъанлъари
- Selo
- Location within Republic of Dagestan Location within Russia
- Coordinates: 42°45′N 46°38′E
- Country: Russia
- Region: Republic of Dagestan
- District: Gumbetovsky District
- Time zone: UTC+3:00

Tantari (Russian: Тантари; Avar: Лъанлъари) is a rural locality (a selo) in Igalinsky Selsoviet, Gumbetovsky District, Republic of Dagestan, Russia. The population was 35000 as of 2010. There are 3 streets.

== Geography ==
Tantari is located 22 km southeast of Mekhelta (the district's administrative centre) by road, on the right bank of the Andiyskoye Koysu River. Kunzakh and Novoye Argvani are the nearest rural localities.
