= Gadari =

Gadari Гадари Гъадари
- Selo
- Location within Republic of Dagestan Location within Russia
- Coordinates: 42°48′N 46°37′E
- Country: Russia
- Region: Republic of Dagestan
- District: Gumbetovsky District
- Time zone: UTC+3:00

Gadari (Russian: Гадари; Avar: Гъадари) is a rural locality (a selo) in Gumbetovsky District, Republic of Dagestan, Russia. The population was 256 as of 2010. There are seven streets.

== Geography ==
Gadari is located 21 km northeast of Mekhelta (the district's administrative centre) by road. Danukh and Argvani are the nearest rural localities.
