= Ichichali =

Ichichali Ичичали ИчичӀали
- Selo
- Location within Republic of Dagestan Location within Russia
- Coordinates: 42°43′N 46°24′E
- Country: Russia
- Region: Republic of Dagestan
- District: Gumbetovsky District
- Time zone: UTC+3:00

Ichichali (Russian: Ичичали; Avar: ИчичӀали) is a rural locality (a selo) in Tsudni-Shabdukhsky Selsoviet, Gumbetovsky District, Republic of Dagestan, Russia. The population was 160 as of 2010. There are 3 streets.

== Geography ==
Ichichali is located 24 km southwest of Mekhelta (the district's administrative centre) by road. Tsundi and Kizhani are the nearest rural localities.
