= Sayyid Abdurrahman =

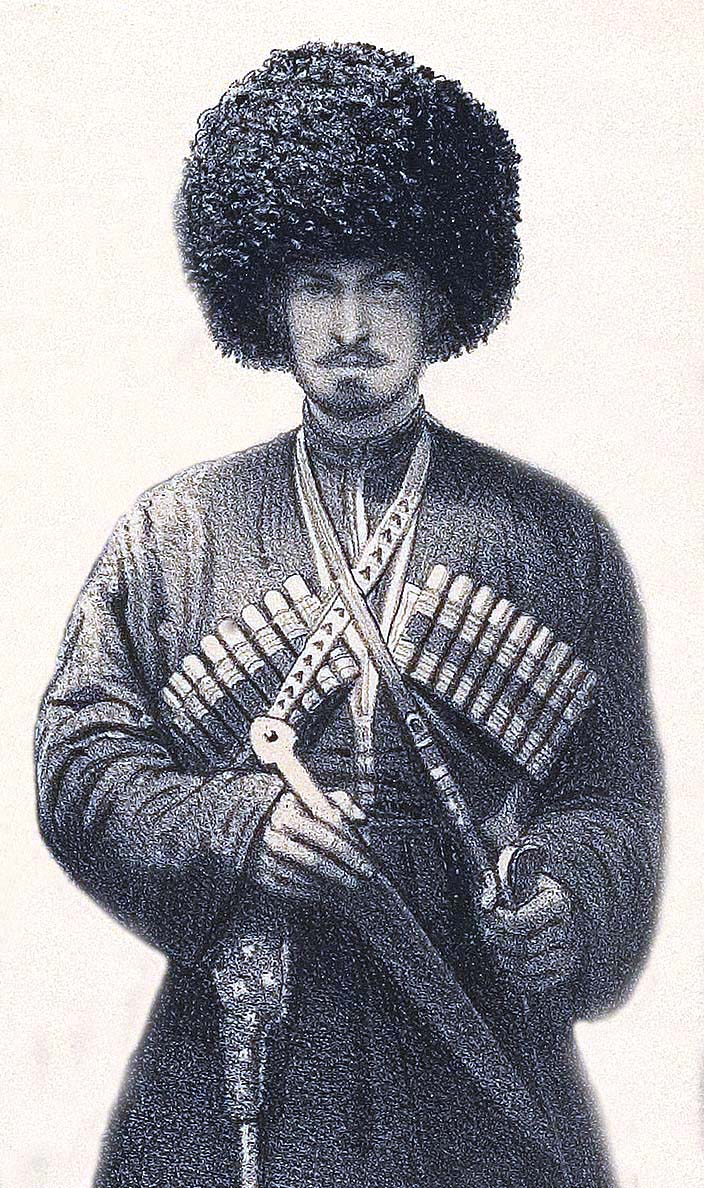
- Born: February 1, 1831; Kumukh village, Gazikumukh Khanate
- Died: 1901; Kumukh village, Russian Empire
- Occupation: Companion of Imam Shamil, chronicler of the Caucasian War, qadi
- Spouse: Nafisat, daughter of Imam Shamil
- Relatives: father Jamaluddin

Sayyid Abdurrahman (Lak: Жамалуттиннул арс АьблурахIман Гъази-Гъумучиял, Arabic: السيد عبد الرحمن ، ابن جمال الدين الحسيني الغازيجوموكي الداغستاني) was the son-in-law of Imam Shamil, a participant in the Caucasian War and the author of the chronicles of Dagestan in the 19th century during the time of the Caucasian Imamate.

== Biography ==
=== Early years ===
Sayyid Abdurrahman was born in the family of Sheikh Jamaluddin in the village of Gazikumukh in 1837, who was the spiritual mentor of Imams Ghazi Muhammad and Imam Shamil. Nisba "al-Husayni" means that Abdurrahman is a descendant of Husayn ibn Ali in the 32nd generation. From his father he received a good education at home, after which he studied in many villages of Dagestan, he knew Arabic and was well acquainted with Muslim law, grammar and poetry.

After completing his studies, he settled in the capital of the Imamate Vedeno, where his father was on Shamil's council. At a fairly early age he married the daughter of Imam Shamil Nafisat. His brother Abdurahim was also married to the Imam's daughter Fatima, and Imam Shamil himself married their sister Zagidat. After the wedding, Abdurrahman entered the immediate circle of the Imam and is inseparably with him, accompanying the imam on campaigns and battles and often serving as a clerk for him.

In 1859, the Russian army takes the village of Vedeno by storm. The Imam with his family and closest associates, including Abdurrahman, moves to the mountains of Dagestan. Shamil's path lay first on mount Kilyatl, but the inhabitants of the surrounding regions did not respond to the call of the Imam to defend himself, and he had to go to mount Gunib, a natural fortress for the defense of which even a small army was enough. Abdurrahman actively participates in the defense of Gunib, being near the imam and accompanies Shamil for negotiations with general Aleksandr Baryatinsky.

=== In Kaluga ===
After the capture of Imam Shamil, Abdurahкman and his family leave Dagestan and go to Kaluga, where by order of Alexander II of Russia Shamil was supposed to be in exile. The bailiff in Shamil's house is сaptain Apollon Runovsky, who had a great influence on Abdurrahman – it was on his advice that Abdurrahman began writing his memoirs, which would later be published under the title "Hulasat at-tafeil" ("A summary of a detailed description of the affairs of Imam Shamil").

The book describes the last days of the existence of the Caucasian Imamate, the transition of the Imam from Vedeno to Dagestan, the betrayals of the naibs of the Imam, the capture of Gunib, Shamil's journey from Dagestan to Kaluga and other details from Shamil's life outside the Caucasus. A large place in the book is devoted to various parables, poetry and admonitions to the inhabitants of Dagestan.

Abdurrahman quickly learned Russian, writes and speaks it easily. According to academician Krachkovsky, Abdurrahman "significantly became Russified during his long stay in Kaluga".

=== In Tbilisi ===
In 1866, Abdurahman's wife Nafisat fell ill and died suddenly. Having obtained permission from the authorities to bury his wife in her homeland in the village of Gimry, Abdurrahman no longer returns to Kaluga, but goes to Tbilisi, where he is enrolled in the Dagestan permanent police. There he finishes work on his second book Kitab tazkir – ("The book of memoirs of Sayyid Abdurrahman, son of Ustaz, Sheikh of the tariqat Jamaluddin al-Husayni about the affairs of the inhabitants of Dagestan and Chechnya. Composed and written in Tiflis in 1285 AH (1869)").

In his work, Abdurrahman describes in detail the life, way of life and customs of Dagestan and Chechnya. He gives unique information about the life of three Imams, about the structure of the Shamil's Imamate, describes the villages of Dagestan, their inhabitants, also tells in detail about the life and tragic death of the son of Imam Shamil Jamaluddin, about the decline of the Imams, the defense of Gunib and negotiations between Shamil and general Baryatinsky.

=== In Dagestan ===
In 1871, Abdurrahman entered the disposal of the head of the Dagestan region, with the appointment of a lifelong pension for him and moved first to Buynaksk, and from there to his native Gazikumukh. When, against the backdrop of the war in 1877, an uprising rises in Chechnya and Dagestan he does not support it and even participates in the pacification of the highlanders.

Later, in 1883, he would write his last work: "The Fall of Dagestan and Chechnya due to the incitement of the Ottomans in 1877," which academician Krachkovsky refers to as written "by direct order of the Russian authorities."

Further information about the life of Abdurrahman is rather abrupt. It is only known for certain that in 1891 he worked as a qadi in Gazikumukh, where he later died in 1901.

== See also ==
- Imam Shamil
- Caucasian Imamate
- History of Dagestan

== Sources ==
- Runovsky A. I. (1862) Excerpts from the notes of Abdurrahman, son of Jamaluddin, about Shamil's stay in Vedeno and other things. // Tbilis: Caucasus: newspaper (No. 72).
- Krachkovsky, Ignaty (1960). Selected works [In 6 volumes]. Moscow, St. Petersburg: Acad. Sciences of the USSR. p. 561.
- Gadzhiev, Bulach (1992). Shamil from Gimry to Medina. Дагестанское книжное изд-во. pp. 48, 67. ISBN 978-5-297-00992-9.
- Gadzhiev M. S.; Navruzov A. R.; Shikhsaidov A. R. (2008). Dagestan shrines [collection of 3 books]. Makhachkala: Эпоха. p. 132. ISBN 978-5-98390-051-6.
- Tagirova N. A. (2016). "Abdurrahman from Gazikumukh: a biographical sketch". Bulletin of the Dagestan Scientific Center of the Russian Academy of Sciences: scientific journal (60): 99. ISSN 1684-792X.
- Ibragimov, Zarema (2017). World of Chechens. 19th-century. Litres. ISBN 978-5-457-95834-0.
