= Nizhneye Inkho =

Nizhneye Inkho Нижнее Инхо Гъоркьа Инхо
- Selo
- Location within Republic of Dagestan Location within Russia
- Coordinates: 42°46′N 46°32′E
- Country: Russia
- Region: Republic of Dagestan
- District: Gumbetovsky District
- Time zone: UTC+3:00

Nizhneye Inkho (Russian: Нижнее Инхо; Avar: Гъоркьа Инхо) is a rural locality (a selo) in Gumbetovsky District, Republic of Dagestan, Russia. The population was 1,339 as of 2010. There are 4 streets.

== Geography ==
Nizhneye Inkho is located 33 km south of Mekhelta (the district's administrative centre) by road. Verkhneye Inkho and Kilyatl are the nearest rural localities.
