= Kilyatl =

Kilyatl Килятль КилалӀ
- Selo
- Location within Republic of Dagestan Location within Russia
- Coordinates: 42°42′N 46°27′E
- Country: Russia
- Region: Republic of Dagestan
- District: Gumbetovsky District
- Time zone: UTC+3:00

Kilyatl (Russian: Килятль; Avar: КилалӀ) is a rural locality (a selo) in Gumbetovsky District, Republic of Dagestan, Russia. The population was 1,032 as of 2010. There are 19 streets.

== Geography ==
Kilyatl is located 38 km southwest of Mekhelta (the district's administrative centre) by road. Nizhneye Inkho and Verkhneye Inkho are the nearest rural localities.
