= Tlyarata, Gumbetovsky District, Republic of Dagestan =

Tlyarata Тлярата ЛъаратӀа
- Selo
- Location within Republic of Dagestan Location within Russia
- Coordinates: 42°47′N 46°31′E
- Country: Russia
- Region: Republic of Dagestan
- District: Gumbetovsky District
- Time zone: UTC+3:00

Tlyarata (Russian: Тлярата; Avar: ЛъаратӀа) is a rural locality (a selo) in Gumbetovsky District, Republic of Dagestan, Russia. The population was 578 as of 2010. There are 8 streets.

== Geography ==
Tlyarata is located 4 km east of Mekhelta (the district's administrative centre) by road. Mekhelta and Ingishi are the nearest rural localities.
