= Siege of Akhoulgo =

1839 siege during the Murid War

Coordinates: 42.777°N 46.742°E

Siege of Akhulgo
- Part of the Murid War
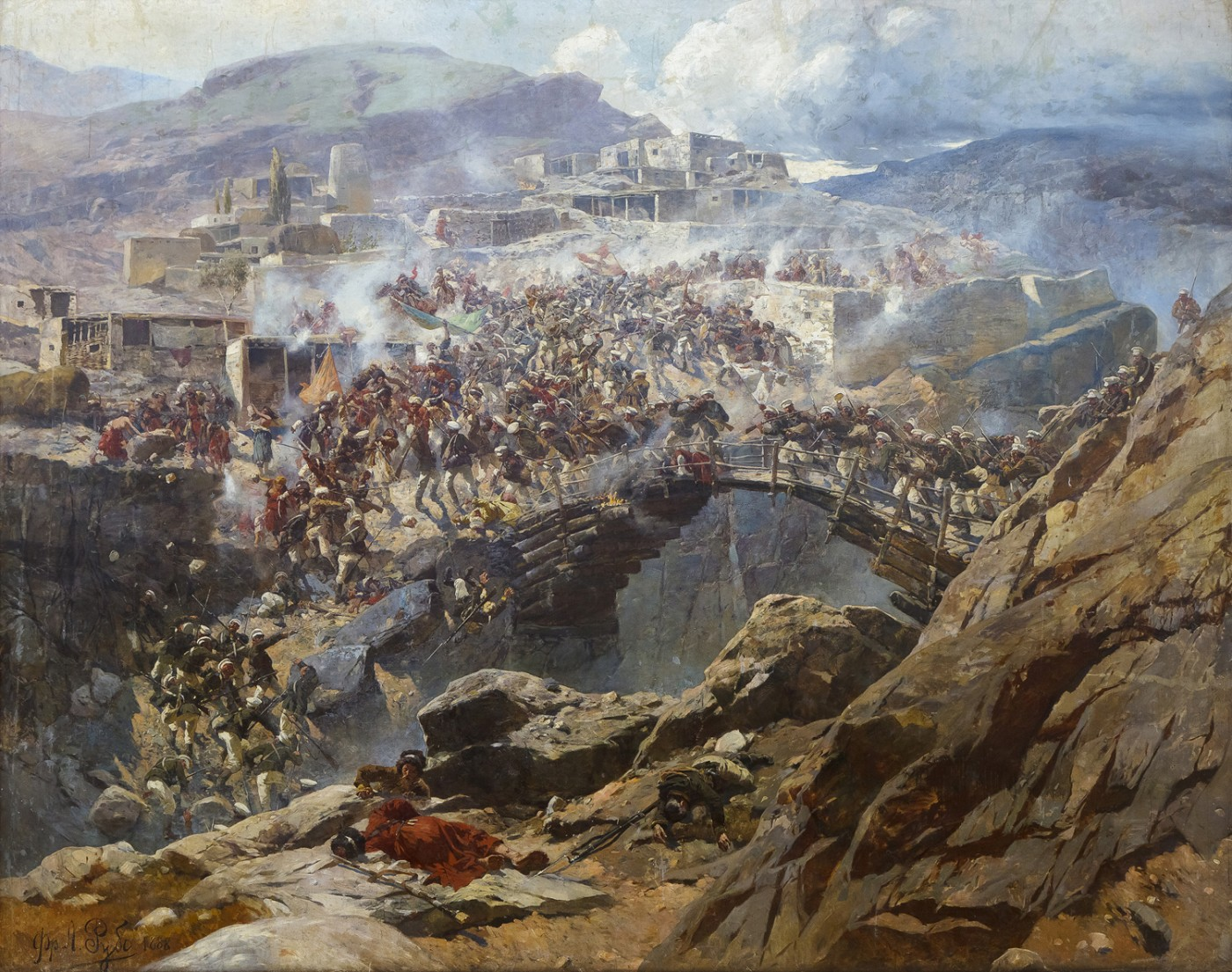
- A panoramic painting by Franz Roubaud
Date	12 June – 22 August 1839
Location	Akhulgo, Dagestan, Caucasian Imamate
Result	Russian victory; Successful escape from Akhulgo by Imam Shamil

Belligerents
Russian Empire	Caucasian Imamate

Commanders and leaders
(Russian Empire) Yevgeny Golovin (Russian Empire) Pavel Grabbe (Russian Empire) David Gurieli † (Russian Empire) Alexander Wrangel	Imam Shamil; Alibek Khiriyasul; Akhberdil Mohammed

Strength
~30,000	5,000

Casualties and losses
No less than 4000	1,000 killed 900 prisoners mostly women, children and old men

The siege of Akhulgo took place in June–August 1839 during the Caucasian War between the Russian Empire and the Caucasian Imamate led by Shamil. General Pavel Grabbe besieged Imam Shamil in the rock-fortress of Akhulgo. After 80 days the rock was taken and most of the defenders were killed, but Shamil managed to escape.

== Geography ==
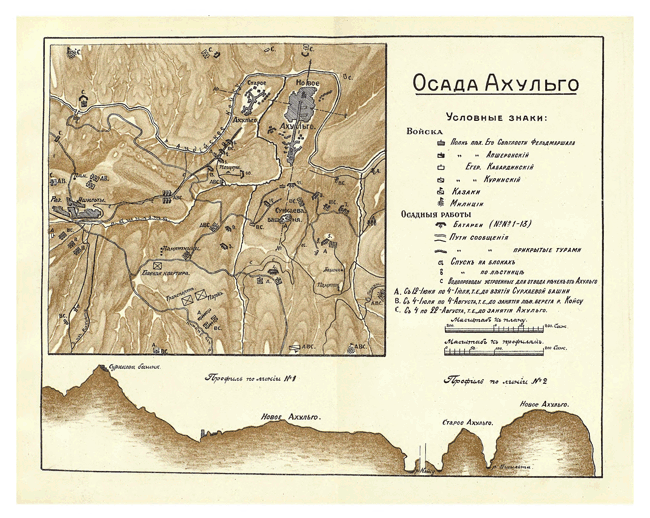
Russian map of Akhulgo

About 75 km west of the Caspian Sea the east-flowing Andi Koysu joins the north-flowing Avar Koysu to form the Sulak River which flows northeast. All three flow in canyons. About 5 km south is the village of Gimry where Ghazi Muhammad was killed in 1832. Akhulgo is about 5 km west. At Akhulgo the Andi Koysu flows east, then north, east, south and east, forming a rectangle. Inside the rectangle are two steep hills several hundred feet above the river. The western one, Old Akhulgo, is narrow and runs north-south. It is somewhat comma-shaped and can only be approached easily along a narrow ridge from the village of Ashitla to the southwest. The eastern one, New Akhulgo, is broader and higher. Between them runs the Ashitla River. At a narrow point in canyon the two hills were connected by a bridge 40 meters above the Ashitla River. South of New Akhulgo and outside the rectangle is the conical Surkhay’s Tower which is taller than the other two and dominates the whole area. In addition to their steepness there were natural and artificial caves and semi-underground houses. The place is a natural fortress whose only weakness is the difficulty of hauling water up from the river.

== Buildup ==
The 1837 expedition: In 1837 General Fese destroyed the village of Ashitla and then killed a number of fugitives who had fortified themselves at Old Akhulgo by blasting then with cannon from Surkhay’s Tower. Shamil viewed the ruins of Ashitla and this may have influenced him to improve the fortifications at New Akhulgo. See Murid War for details.

The march: The plan was to attack Akhulgo in two columns, one from Fort Vnezapnaya (modern Endirey) 45 km north of Akhulgo and one from Temir-Khan-Shura {Buynaksk} 30 km east. Since Shamil had many supporters to the north the main force was the northern one and the eastern column was used mainly for supplies. Probably to avoid the Avar Koysu canyon the eastern force would go south, then west to Kunzakh, then north to Akhulgo. The march began from Vnezapnaya on 21 May {all dates old style, so add 12 days for the Western calendar}. On 25 May they dispersed a group under Shamil himself at Burtunay with little fighting. They then faced the fortified village of Argouani (modern Argvani does not quite fit Baddeley’s description). The place was difficult to attack, but too strong to bypass and there was no time for a siege. On 30–31 May it was blasted open with artillery, taken by storm and the inhabitants slaughtered. The Russians lost 146 killed and 500 wounded and the mountaineers perhaps 2000. They now had the problem of crossing the Andi Koysu and contacting the supply column that was waiting on the Betli plateau south of Akhulgo. They captured one of the destroyed bridges, rebuilt it with roof beams from the nearby village, crossed with some of their men and made contact with the supply column. On 11 June they repaired the bridge at Chirkata and on 12 June occupied the ruins of Ashilta less than a kilometer southwest of Akhulgo, thus beginning the siege.

== The siege ==
Shamil was now shut in with about 4000 people, of whom something over 1000 were fighting men (Baddeley does not explain why the women and children were not evacuated). Grabbe had about 6000 Russians and 3500 native militia. Seeing that those on the north bank were in a dangerous position, on 14 June he withdrew them to the south bank, which was a mistake. On the night of 18–19 June, the Murids occupied Ashitla without being noticed. Had they been more aggressive they might have accomplished something, but they were driven off the next morning.

Surkhay's Tower taken: At dawn on 29 June cannons opened up on Surkhay’s Tower with little effect. The assault began at 9 AM. They got almost to the top but could go no further. The attack was called off at dusk with a loss of 300 men (36 killed), but the Murids had lost a larger share of their men. Heavier guns were brought up and on 04 jul bombardment began which soon reduced the top to a mass of ruins. The Murids held out, the assaulting parties were withdrawn and the bombardment continued. Seeing no hope the few remaining defenders tried to slip through the Russian lines. When the final storming party reached the summit they found only a few wounded. The Russian loss on the final day was only 12 killed.

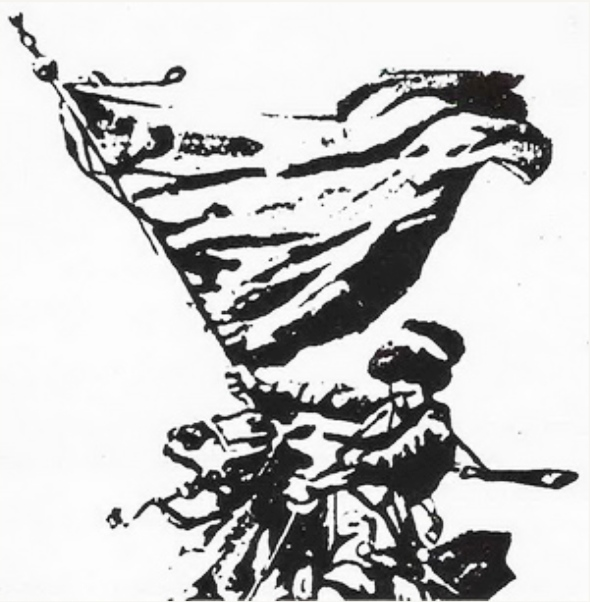
Illustration a panoramic painting storm Akhulgo, by Franz Roubaud 1891.

The Russian lines were now shortened and they were relieved of fire from Surkhay’s Tower. The works were brought closer and new batteries set up. On 12 July, 3500 reinforcements arrived. Grabbe now had 10,092 Russians and the native militia. Both sides were semi-besieged in that Shamil could bring some supplies from the north while Grabbe had to bring his supplies through dangerous country. His main problem was bringing artillery shells to batter the fortress. The third assault was set for 16jul. There would be three columns. The largest force would attack New Akhulgo {east} along a narrow ridge, the second would assault Old Akhulgo {west} and the smallest force would penetrate the Ashitla canyon and swing one way or the other as circumstances permitted. Bombardment lasted from dawn to 2 PM, the troops moved up and the attack began at 5 PM. The eastern column took the first outwork on the ridge and were then confronted by a ditch that they knew nothing about. 600 men were now confined to a small space with cliffs on three sides and a narrow path back. They were only saved by darkness. If the attack had not started so late in the day it is unlikely that any would have survived. The center column penetrated some way into the gorge, drew heavy fire from Old Akhulgo on the left and a shower of rocks from New Akhulgo on the right and was forced to retreat. The western column accomplished nothing at Old Akhulgo. The attack was a total failure. The Russians lost 156 killed and 719 wounded while the defenders lost perhaps 150.

A whole month was spent improving the Russian position with only 100 men lost, but sanitary conditions were bad and the Russian force dwindled to 6000. Grabbe realized that Shamil was receiving supplies and re-enforcements from the north so on 04aug two battalions managed to cross the river and position themselves north of Akhulgo, thus completing the siege. A covered gallery was built with great difficulty toward New Akhulgo to bring up men secretly and safely. Shamil’s position worsened. He was drawing fire from all sides, water could only be gotten by climbing down the rock under fire, there was no wood for cooking, the sun was hot and it was difficult to bury the dead. Negotiations were attempted with no result.

Grabbe made the fourth assault on 17 August. The same three columns were used and the result was the same failure. 102 were killed, 162 wounded and 293 contused by thrown rocks and falls. But Shamil had lost a larger share of his men. He raised a white flag and sent his 12-year-old son as hostage The next day General Pullo was admitted to the rock for discussions, but it became clear that Shamil did not intend to surrender.

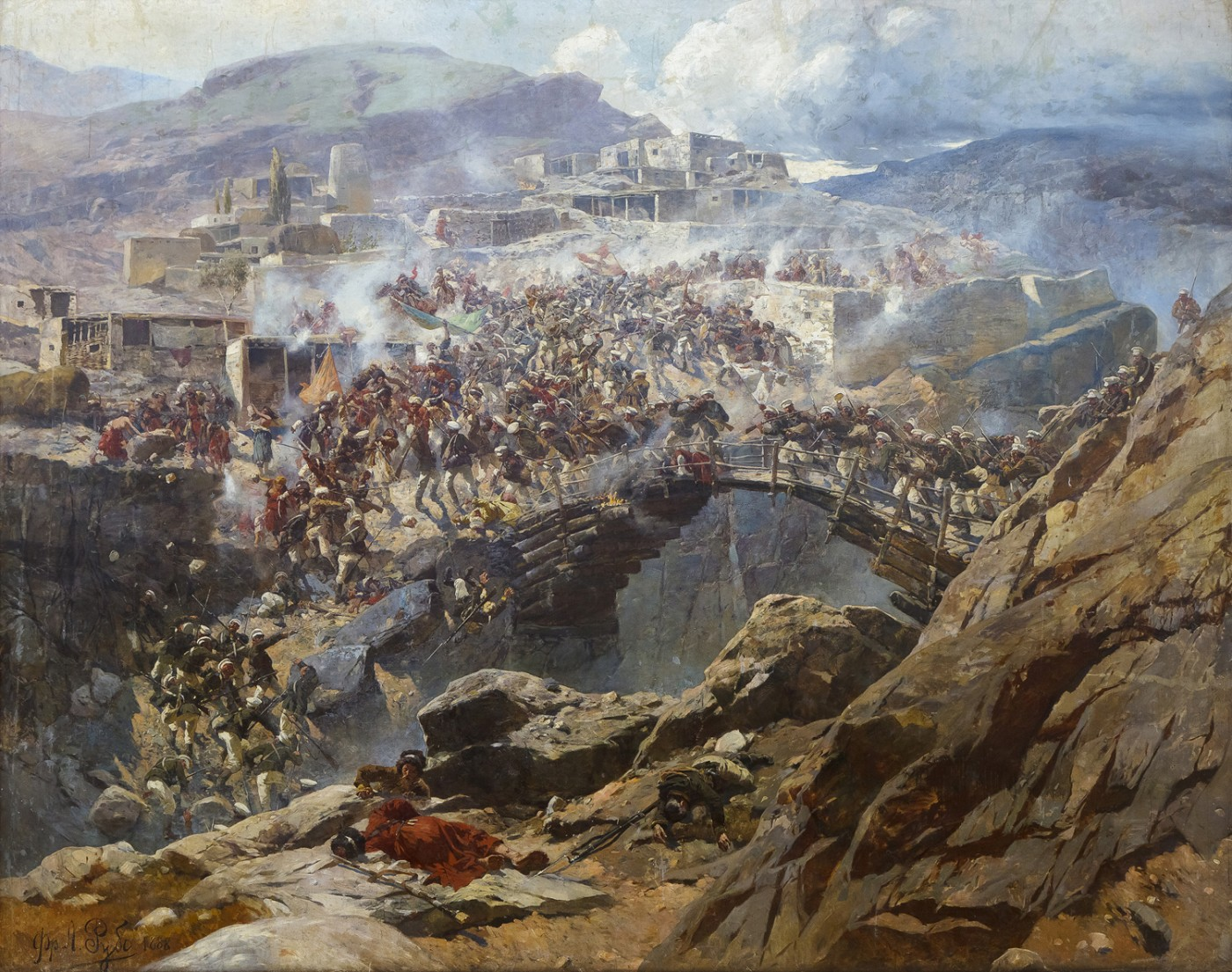
Defenders escape from New Akhulgo to Old Akhulgo across the bridge

Final Assault: The fifth assault began on 21 August and again failed. The next morning the attack was renewed. The Russians met almost no resistance and gained possession of New Akhulgo. They found large numbers of fugitives scaling the opposite cliff or still climbing down to reach the bridge to Old Akhulgo. Tarasevich’s column entered the gorge, climbed up and captured the bridge and reached the top of Old Akhulgo before the garrison could stop them. The two days' fighting cost the Russians 150 killed and 494 wounded. Among those killed was the Georgian cornet David Gurieli, the last Prince of Guria. Since most who remained on the rock refused to surrender, the fighting, or slaughter, continued for a week. Each house or cave had to be individually taken. Men were lowered on ropes to search the caves on the cliff side. Mothers killed their children, some flung themselves off cliffs, women and children attacked bayonets with rocks and daggers. Some pretended to surrender and then killed their captors. Tarasevich died this way. More than 1000 corpses were counted and there were 900 prisoners, mostly women, children and old men. By 29 August there was no one alive on the rock but Russians. The 80-day siege cost the Russians 512 killed, 1722 wounded and 694 contused, plus uncounted losses from disease. The Russians searched for Shamil’s body but could not find it. None of the prisoners could or would say where he was.

== Shamil's escape ==
Shamil’s second wife Djavarat was killed during the siege and his sister Fatima threw herself off a cliff. On the night of 21/22aug, before New Akhulgo was abandoned, Shamil with his pregnant first wife Fatimat, their young son Khazi Mahommed and a few followers lowered themselves to a cave above the river. The next night they descended to the river, built a raft, loaded it with dummies and set it adrift. While the pickets were distracted they went downstream along the river bank and turned south up a ravine. They met a picket and killed the officer but Shamil and his small son were wounded. They returned to the river, bridged it with a plank {sic. Baddeley’s geography does not fit Google Earth.} and headed northwest. Within a year Shamil had re-established his rule in Chechnya. Grabbe withdrew from the mountains and dismissed his men to winter quarters. Akhulgo was never again inhabited.

== See also ==
- Battle of Argvani

== Sources ==
- J. F. Baddeley, The Russian Conquest of the Caucasus, 1908
- Jaques T. Akhulgo, 1839 // Dictionary of Battles and Sieges: A Guide to 8,500 Battles from Antiquity through the Twenty-first Century, Vol. 1—3 (англ.) / Forew. by D. E. Showalter. — Westport, Connecticut; London: Greenwood Press, 2007. — Vol. 1. — P. 21. — ISBN 978-0-313-33537-2.
- Description of the military operations of 1839 in Northern Dagestan. Colonel Milyutin D. A. St. Petersburg. 1850.
- Akhulgo assault, 1839 / V. M. Mukhanov // Ankylosis - Bank. - M .: Great Russian Encyclopedia, 2005. - P. 580. - (Great Russian Encyclopedia: [in 35 volumes] / editor-in-chief Yu. S. Osipov; 2004-2017, v. 2). — ISBN 5-85270-330-3.
