= Argvani =

Argvani Аргвани Аргъвани
- Selo
- Location within Republic of Dagestan Location within Russia
- Coordinates: 42°48′N 46°34′E
- Country: Russia
- Region: Republic of Dagestan
- District: Gumbetovsky District
- Time zone: UTC+3:00

Argvani (Russian: Аргвани; Avar: Аргъвани) is a rural locality (a selo) and the administrative centre of Argvaninsky Selsoviet, Gumbetovsky District, Republic of Dagestan, Russia. The population was 796 as of 2010. There are 5 streets.

== Geography ==
Argvani is located 14 km northeast of Mekhelta (the district's administrative centre) by road. Tlyarata and Novoye Argvani are the nearest rural localities.
