= Gimri =

Gimri may refer to:

- Gimry, Dagestan, Russia
- Gyumri, Armenia
