= Gimry fighting =

2006 conflict in Dagestan, Russia

- Part of Second Chechen War
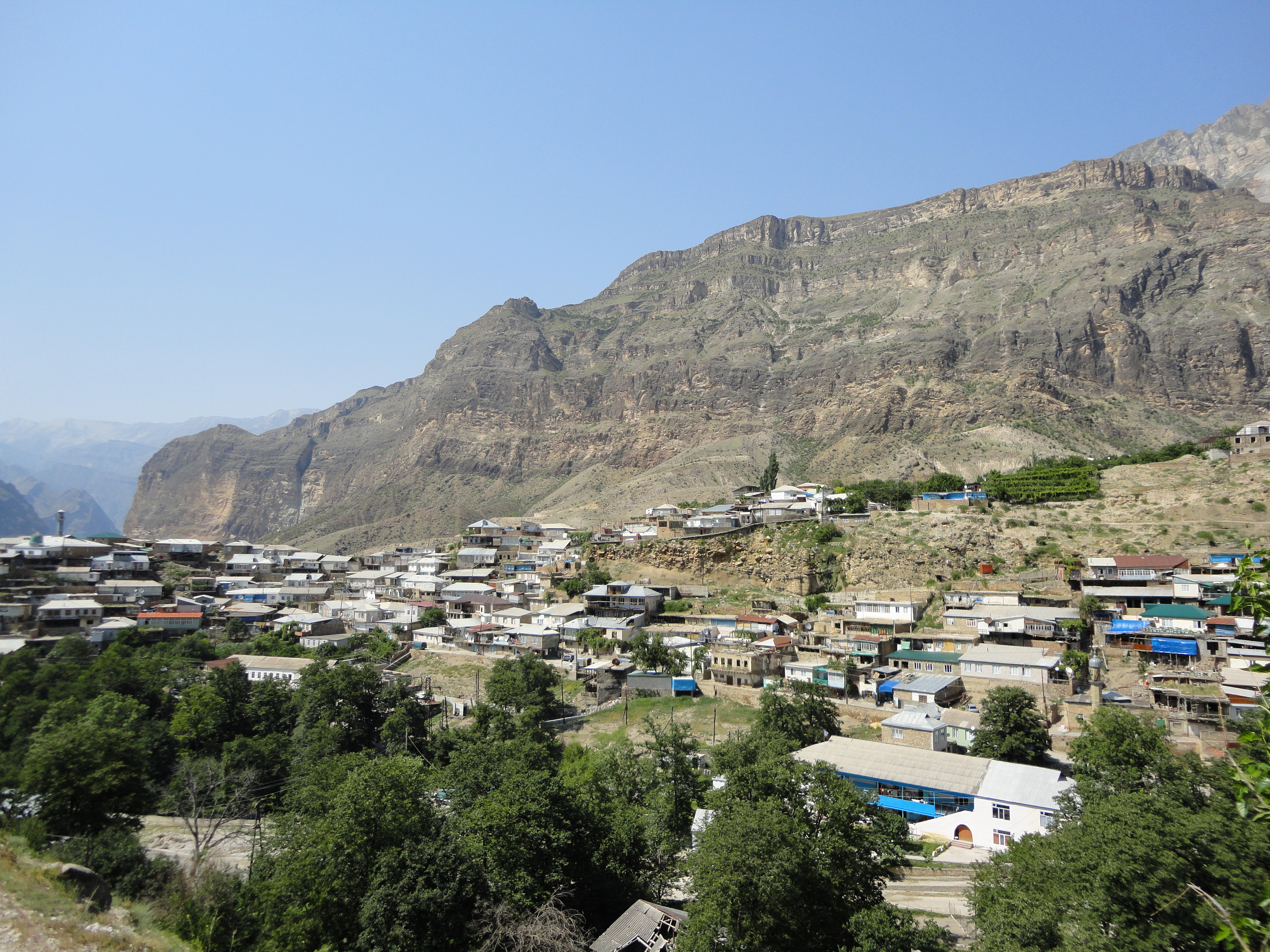
- Village of Gimry
Date	January 2 – January 5, 2006
Location	Near Gimry, Dagestan
Result	Russian victory; Rebel retreat

Belligerents
Russia: Dagestan	Dagestani rebels

Commanders and leaders
(Dagestan) Adilgerei Magomedtagirov	?

Strength
Some 3,000	Up to 8 to 30

Casualties and losses
At least 3 killed and 10+ wounded Rebels claimed 50+ casualties	1 or 2 (Russians claimed blood trails)

Gimry fighting were armed clashed that took place between January 2 – January 5, 2006, near the village of Gimry in the mountainous region of Daghestan.The fighting was part of a larger insurgency in the Northern Caucasus between Russian government forces and local fighters, some linked to Chechen separatist and Islamist groups.

== The battle ==
The fighting happened on a mountain between some 3,000 Russian troops, including 1,500 special forces on one side and a group of estimated up to eight armed rebels (or 30 according to the Kavkaz Center version). The government forces were led by the Dagestani Interior Minister Adilgerei Magomedtagirov (the Ministry said the militant group included suspects in a recent assassination attempt on the Deputy Interior Minister that left his son dead).

Despite heavy artillery and aerial bombardment all the fighters managed to escape the encirclement back to the village, leaving behind only an abandoned dugout. At least three OMON and Spetznaz servicemen died and more than 10 were wounded in a three-day battle, some of them possibly by friendly fire. According to the separatist website, more than 50 Russian troops were "eliminated".

The government's plans to pacify the village of Gimry were initially dropped because of the village's symbolical importance as the historical birthplace of Imam Shamil. The large-scale cleansing operation in the village was however carried out in the winter of 2007-2008.
