= Gimry Tunnel =

Road tunnel in Dagestan, Russia

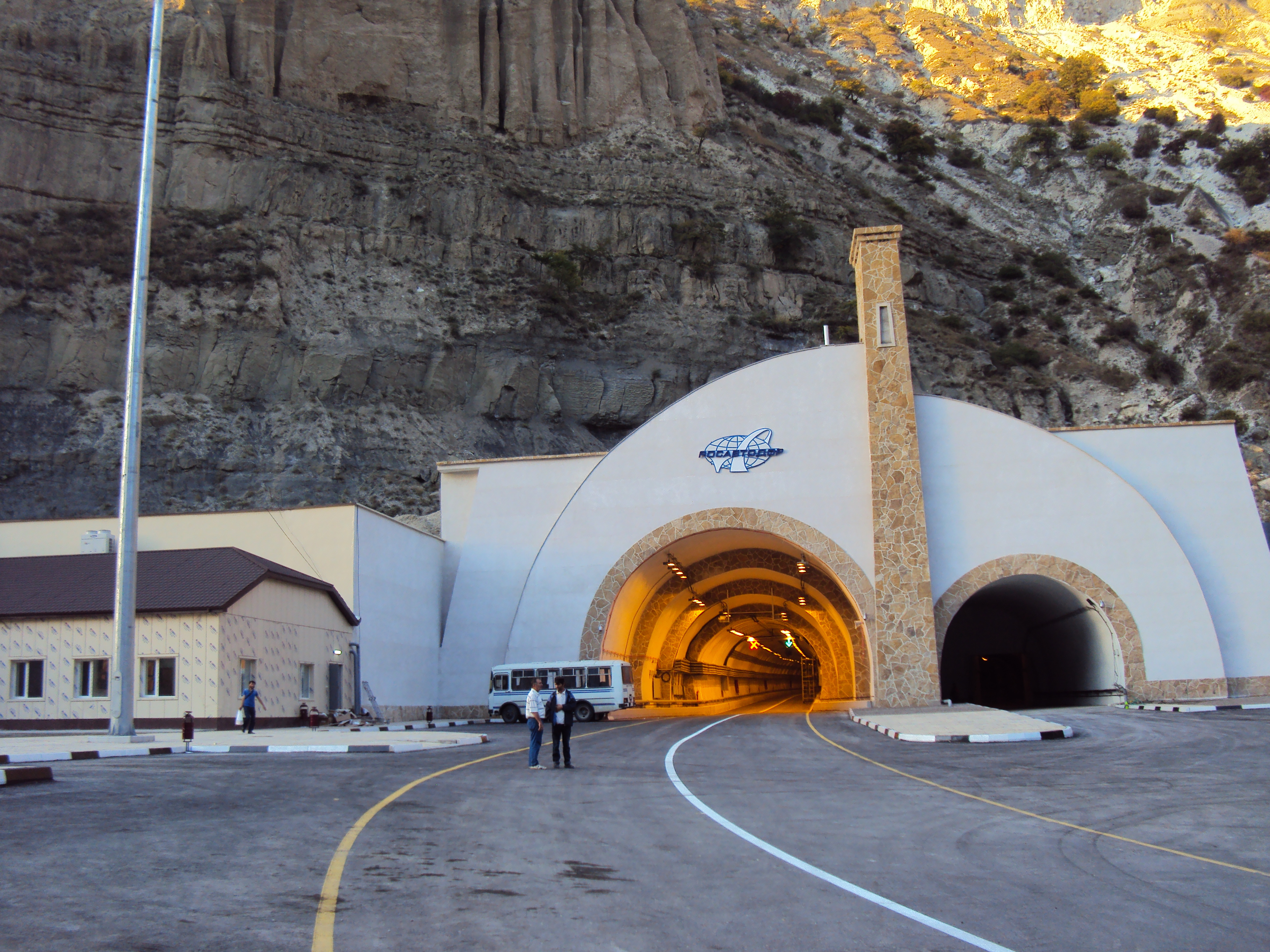

- Location within Republic of Dagestan

Overview
- Coordinates: 42°45′17″N 46°55′21″E

Operation
- Opened: 1991
- Reopened: 2012

Technical
- Length: 4,303 m (14,117 ft)
- No. of lanes: 2
- Tunnel clearance: 5 m (16 ft)
- Width: 7 m (23 ft)

The Gimry road tunnel (Russian: Гимринский автодорожный тоннель, Gimrinsky road tunnel) is the longest road tunnel in Russia and the former Soviet Union. Located in the Caucasus Mountains of Dagestan, the tunnel connects Buinaksk (and Makhachkala) with mountain villages such as Gimry, Gunib and Khunzakh. The capacity of the tunnel is 4000 vehicles per hour. It was opened in 1991, closed for reconstruction in the mid-2000s and did not reopen until 2012.

A straight line from the Caspian Sea west to Gimry rises from near sea level to about 6000 feet and then suddenly drops 5000 feet down at the Avar Koysu canyon. The north portal is about 3800 feet, the south portal about 3700 feet and the mountain above about 6400 feet. From the south portal the road descends steeply about 400 feet and reaches the bottom of a side canyon that leads seven kilometers northwest to Gimry.

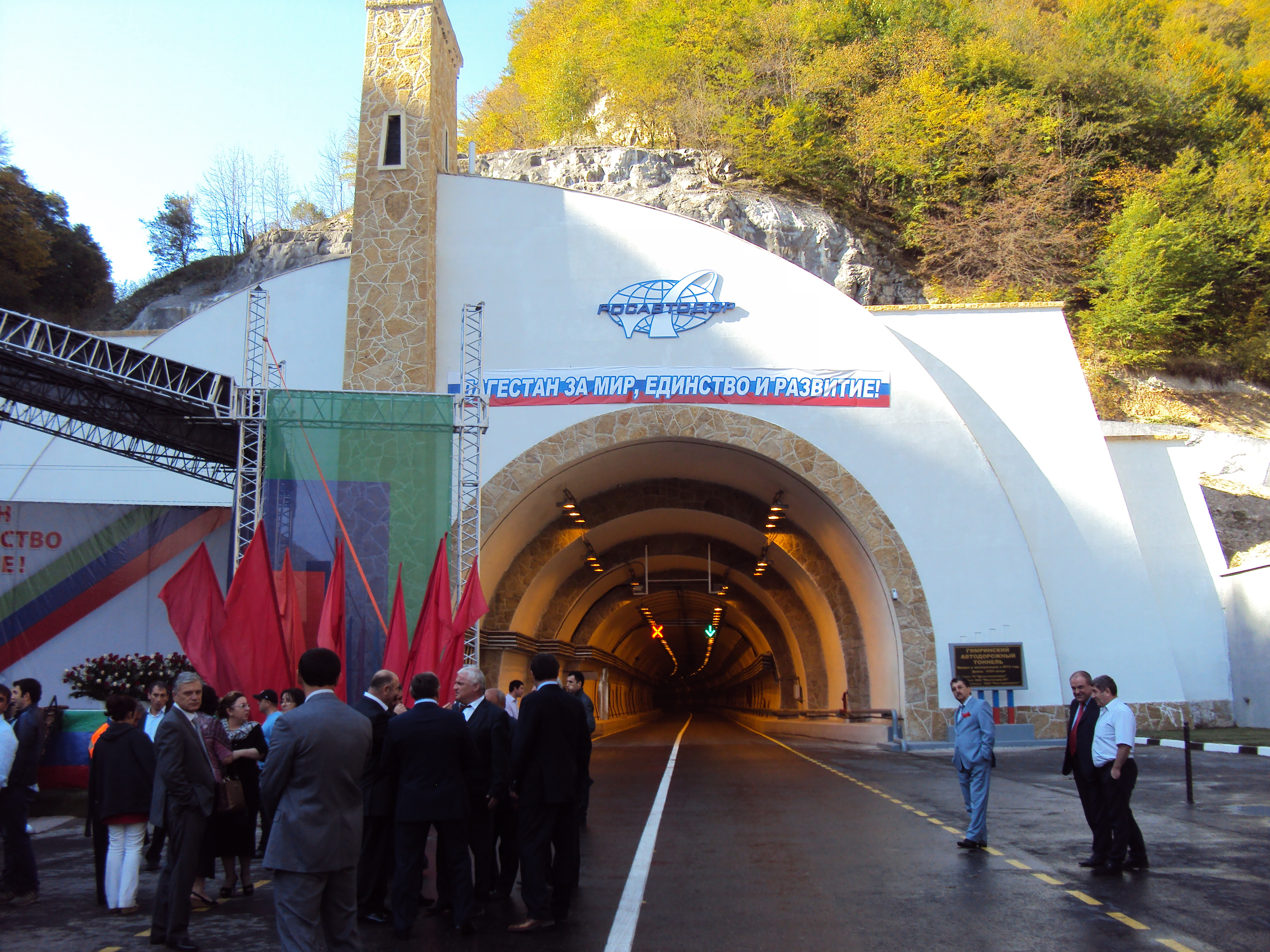

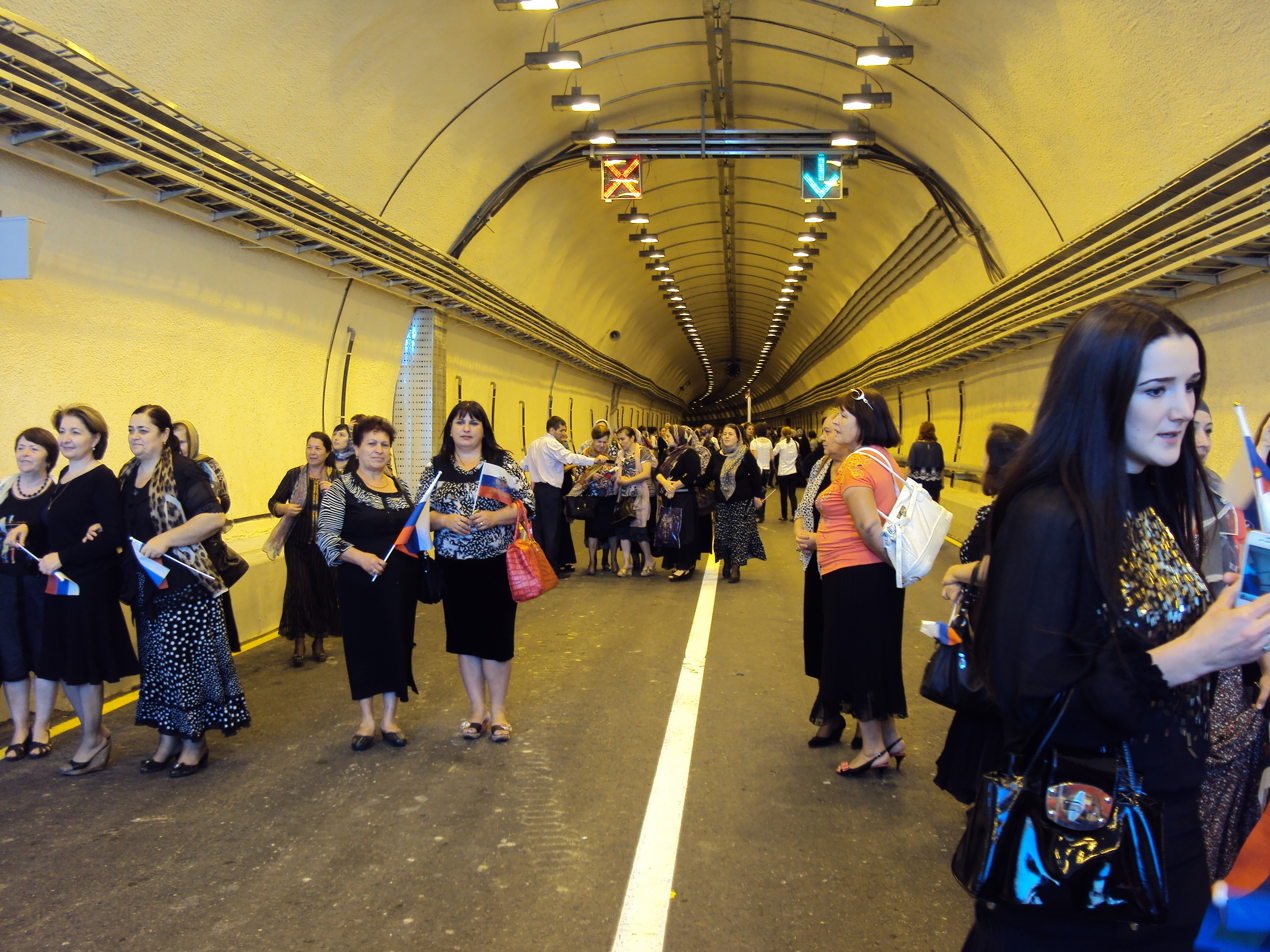

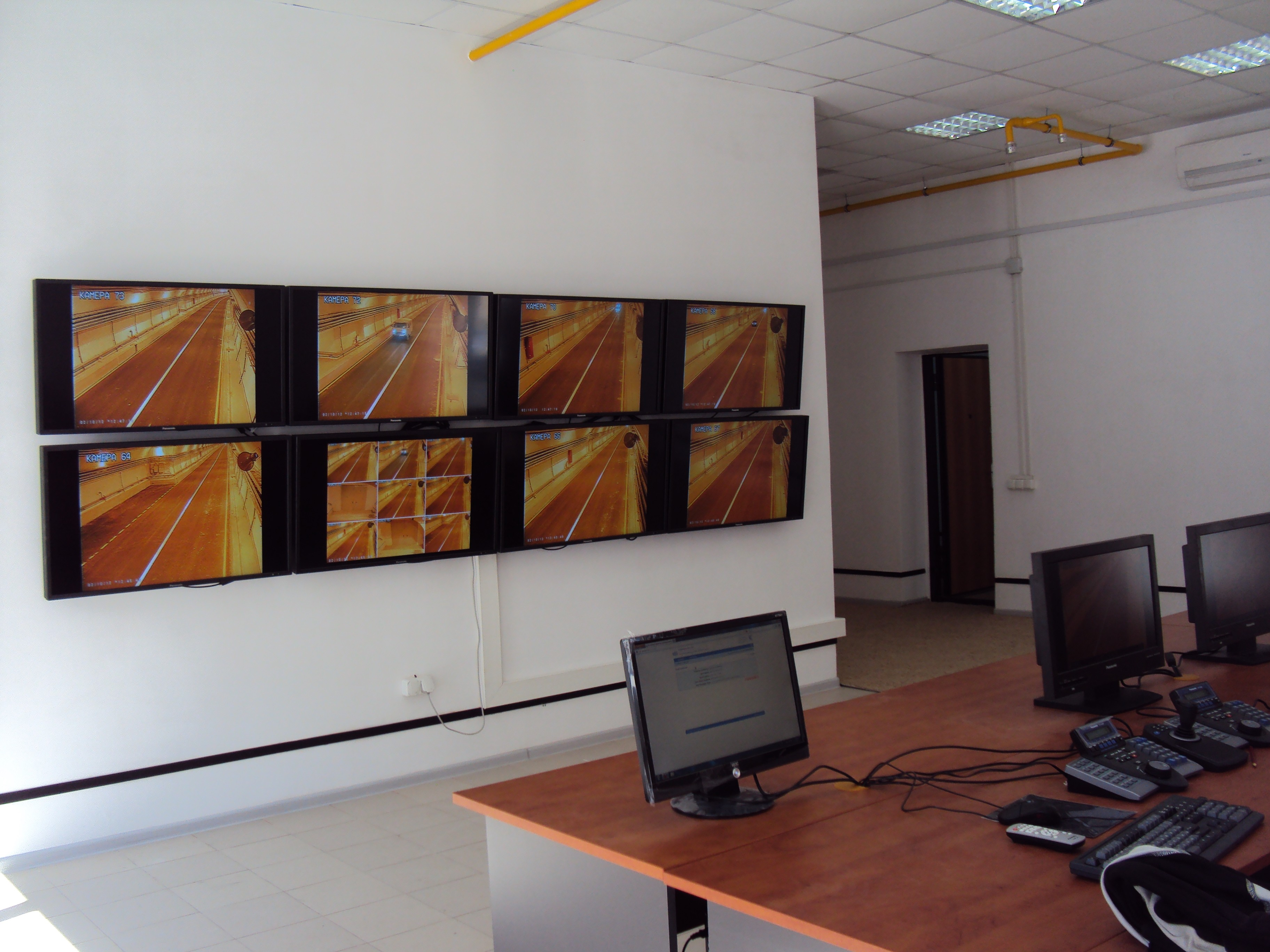

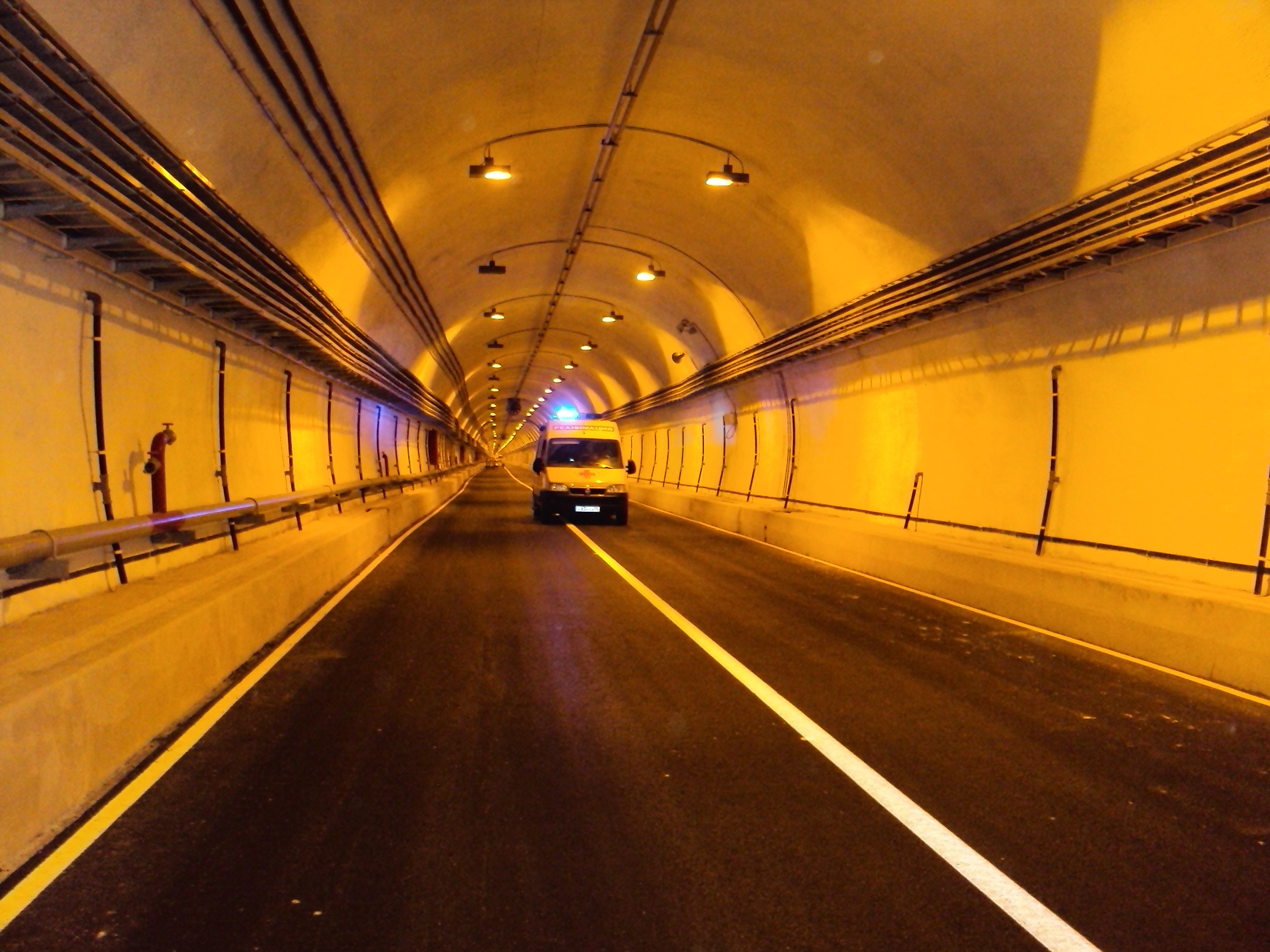
