= Imam Shamil =

Imam of Dagestan (1797–1871)

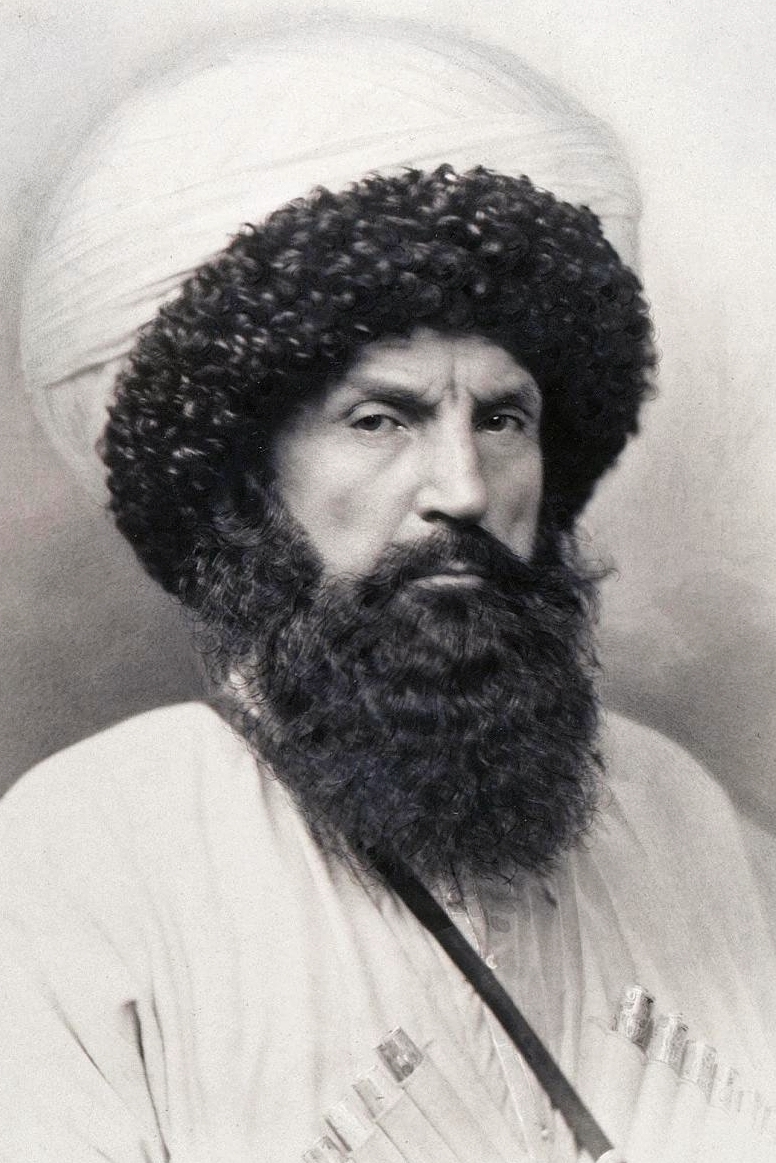
- Shamil in 1859

Imam of Dagestan
- Reign: September 24, 1834 — August 25, 1859
- Predecessor: Hamzat Bek
- Successor: Overthrown by the Russian Empire

Imam of Chechnya
- Reign: March 8, 1840 — August 25, 1859
- Predecessor: Tashaw-Hadji
- Successor: Overthrown by the Russian Empire
- Born: 26 June 1797; Gimry, Dagestan, Avar Nutsaldom
- Died: 4 February 1871 (aged 73); Medina, Habesh Eyalet, Ottoman Empire
- Burial: Jannatul Baqi, Medina
- Father: Dengau
- Mother: Bahu-Mesedu

Religious life
- Religion: Islam
- Denomination: Sunni
- Order: Naqshbandi
- Jurisprudence: Shafi'i
- Creed: Ash'ari

Muslim leader
- Based in: Dagestan and Chechnya
- Post: Imam of the Caucasian Imamate
- Period in office: 1834–1859

Imam Shamil (Note: Arabic: الشيخ شامل, romanized: al-Šaykh Šāmil; Avar: Шейх Шамил, romanized: Sheykh Shamil; Chechen: имам Шемал, romanized: imam Shemal; Kumyk: Шамил, romanized: Şamil; Adyghe: Шыихъ Шамил; Russian: Имам Шамиль) (26 June 1797 – 4 February 1871) was the third Imam of the Caucasian Imamate (1840–1859), and a Muslim sheikh of the Naqshbandi Sufi order. Nicknamed the "Caucasian Eagle", he was the political, military, and spiritual leader of North Caucasian resistance to Imperial Russia in the 1800s; his rule was recognized in Dagestan, Chechnya, and Circassia, the latter indirectly through his representative Muhammad Amin. He is considered a hero by peoples of the Northern Caucasus.

== Family and early life ==
Imam Shamil was born in 1797 into an Avar Muslim family. He was born in the small village (aul) of Gimry (present-day Dagestan, Russia). Some sources state that he had a paternal Kumyk lineage. He was originally named Ali, but following local tradition, his name was changed to Shamuyil (Arabic: شمویل, equivalent to Samuel) when he became ill. This name is pronounced Shamil in the Caucasus, and contemporary sources called him by this name (either شامل Shāmil or شمیل Shamīl in Arabic), although in his writings he always used the form Shamuyil. His father, Dengau, was a landlord, and this position allowed Shamil and his close friend Ghazi Muhammad to study many subjects, including Arabic and logic.

Shamil grew up at a time when the Russian Empire was expanding into the territories of the Ottoman Empire and Qajar Iran (see Russo-Persian War (1804–1813) and Russo-Turkish War (1806–1812)). Many Caucasian peoples united in resistance to Russian imperial aspirations in what became known as the Caucasian War (1817–1864). Earlier leaders of Caucasian resistance included Hadji-Dawud, Sheikh Mansur and Ghazi Mollah. Shamil, a childhood friend of the Mollah, would become his disciple and counsellor.

Shamil had multiple wives, including one of Armenian ethnicity born in Russia named Anna Ivanovna Ulukhanova (or Ulykhanova; 1828-1877). Captured in a raid in 1840, she married Shamil six years later. She converted to Islam as a teenager and adopted the name Shuanet. Shuanet remained loyal to Shamil even after his capture and exile to Russia. After the death of Shamil (1871) she moved to the Ottoman Empire, where the sultan assigned her a pension.

== War against Russia ==
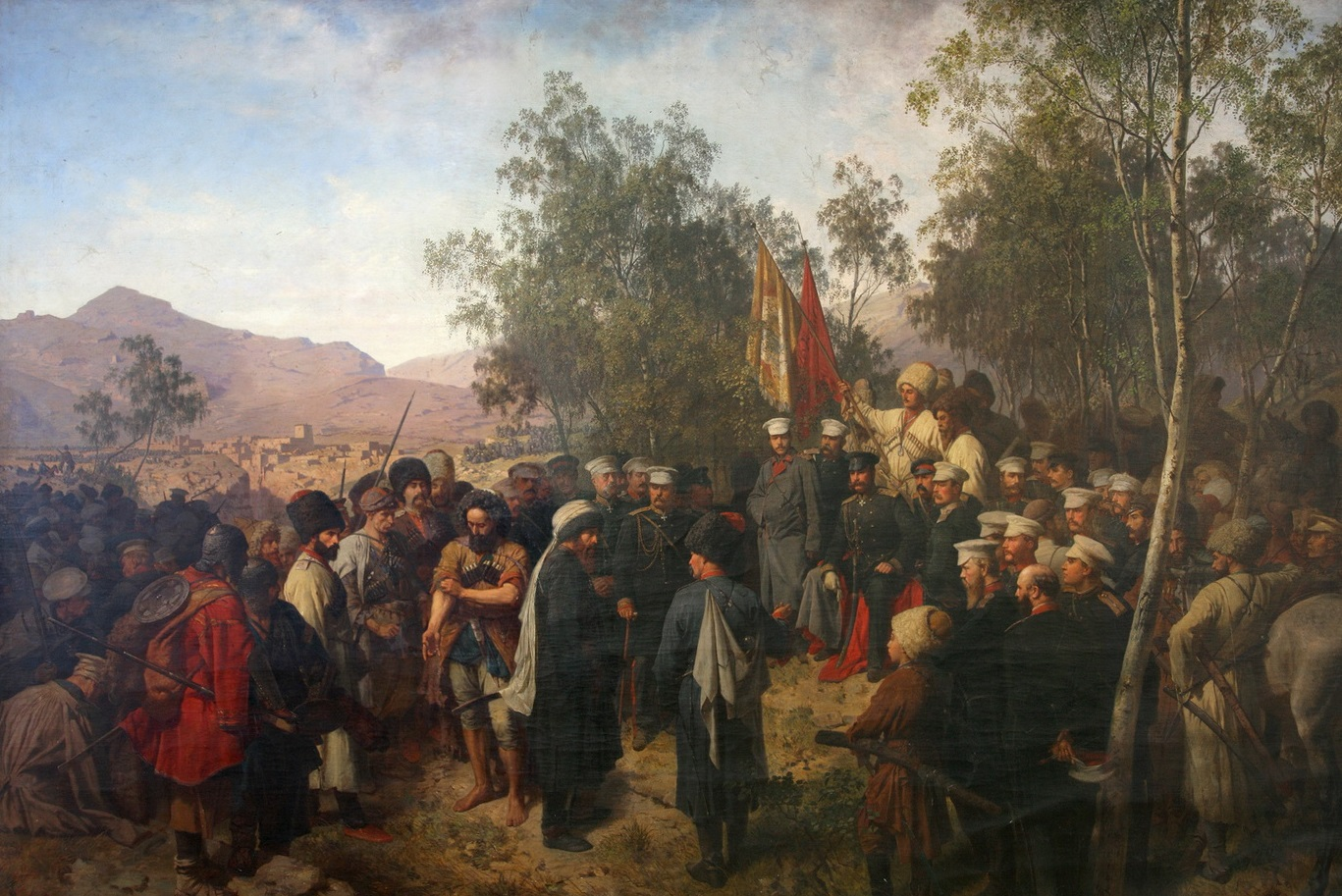
Captured Shamil before the commander-in-chief Prince Bariatinsky on 25 August 1859, by Theodor Horschelt

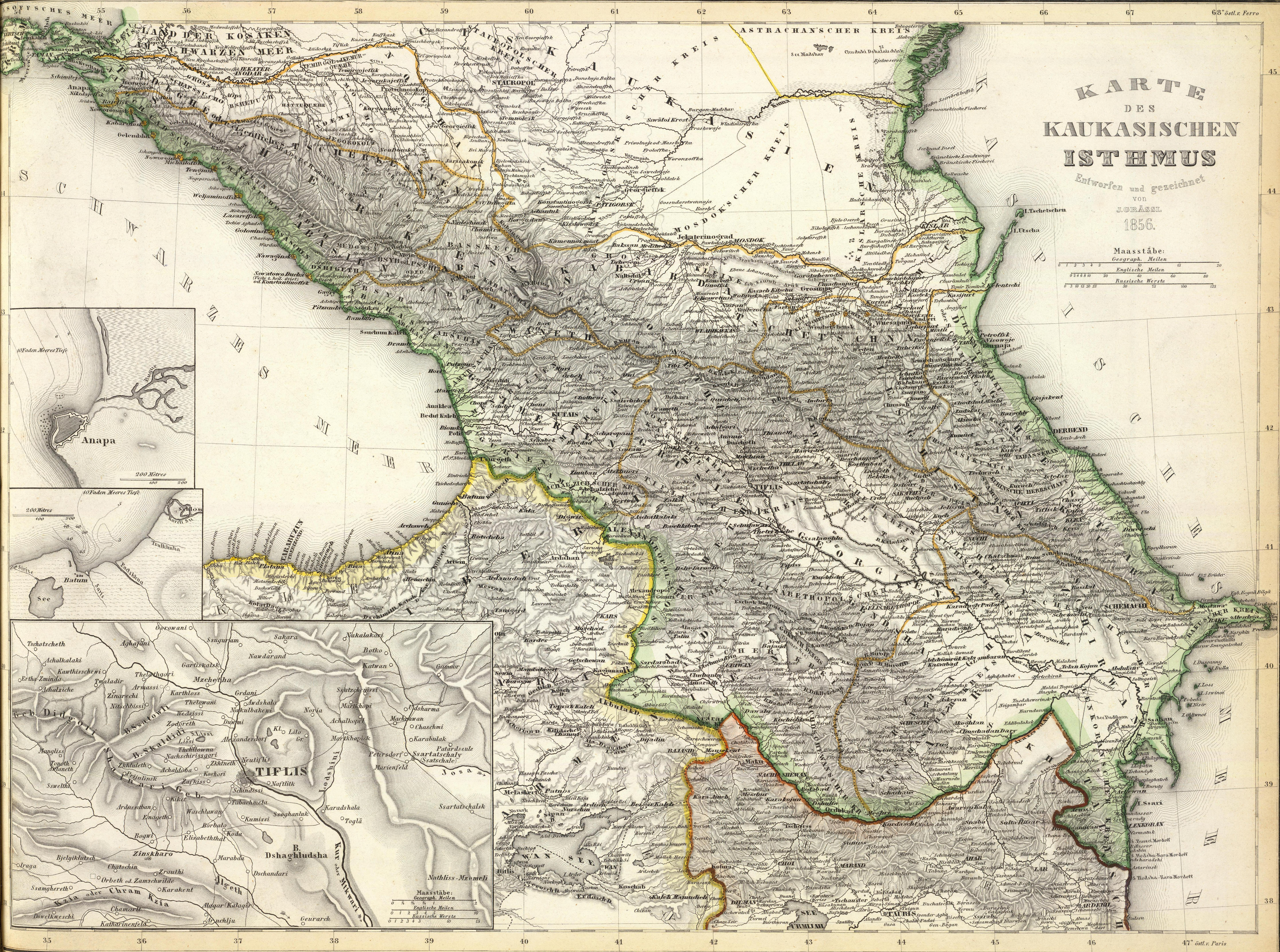
Karte des Kaukasischen Isthmus. Entworfen und gezeichnet von J. Grassl, 1856.

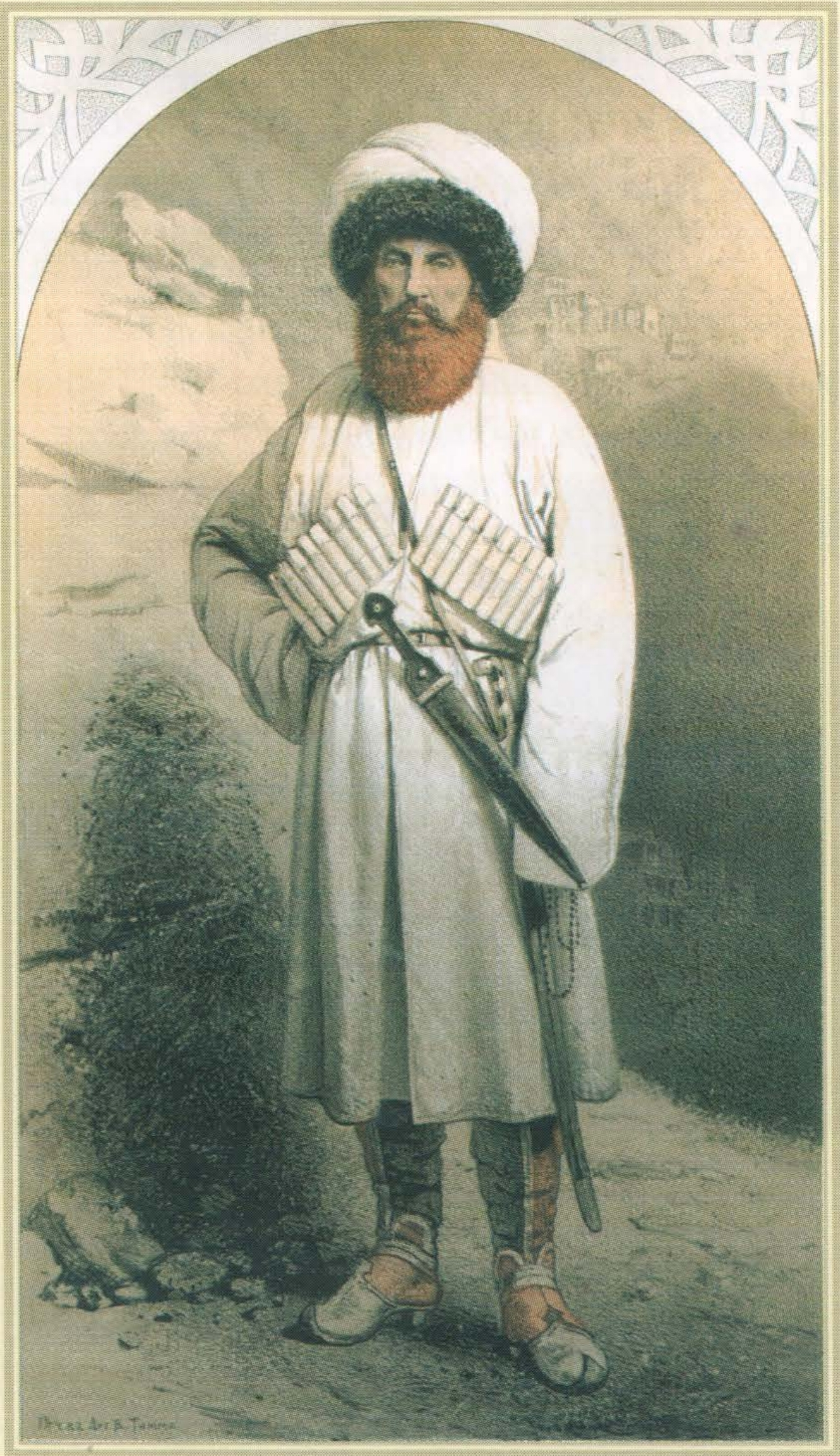
Imam Shamil, Lithography by Vasily Timm

"Shamil's family". Left to right: Ghazi Muhammad's confident, Murid Hajio; Shamil's son Muhammad Shafi; Shamil's sons-in-law: Abdurrahim and Abdurrahman, Kaluga, 1860

In 1832, Ghazi Mollah died at the battle of Gimry, and Shamil was one of only two murids to escape, but he sustained severe wounds. During this fight he was stabbed with a bayonet. After reportedly jumping from an elevated stoop "clean over the heads of the very line of soldiers about to fire on him ... [he landed] behind them, whirling his sword in his left hand he cut down three of them, but was bayoneted by the fourth, the steel plunging deep in his chest. He seized the bayonet, pulled it out of his own flesh, cut down the man, and with another superhuman leap, cleared the wall and vanished in the darkness". He went into hiding and both Russia and murids assumed him dead. Once recovered, he emerged from hiding and rejoined the murids, led by the second Imam, Hamzat Bek. He would wage unremitting warfare on the Russians for the next quarter century and become one of the legendary guerrilla commanders of the century. When Hamzat Bek was killed in 1834, Shamil took his place as the prime leader of the Caucasian resistance and the third Imam of the Caucasian Imamate.

In June–August 1839, Shamil and his followers, numbering about 4000 men, women and children, found themselves under siege in their mountain stronghold of Akhoulgo, nestled in the bend of the Andi Koysu, about ten miles east of Gimry. Under the command of General Pavel Grabbe, the Russian army trekked through lands devoid of supplies because of Shamil's scorched-earth strategy. The geography of the stronghold protected it from three sides, adding to the difficulty of conducting the siege. Eventually the two sides agreed to negotiate. Complying with Grabbe's demands, Shamil gave his son, Jamaldin, in a sign of good faith, as a hostage. Shamil rejected Grabbe's proposal that Shamil command his forces to surrender and for him to accept exile from the region. The Russian army attacked the stronghold, after 2 days of fighting, the Russian troops had secured it. Shamil escaped the siege during the first night of the attack. Shamil's forces had been broken and many Dagestani and Chechen chieftains proclaimed loyalty to the Tsar. Shamil fled Dagestan for Chechnya. There, he made quick work of extending his influence over the clans.

Shamil was effective at uniting the many, quarrelsome Caucasian tribes to fight against the Russians, by the force of his charisma, piety and fairness in applying Sharia law. One Russian source commented on him as "a man of great tact and a subtle politician." He believed the Russian introduction of alcohol in the area corrupted traditional values. Against the large regular Russian military, Shamil made effective use of irregular and guerrilla tactics. In 1845, an 8000-10000 strong column under the command of Count Mikhail Vorontsov followed the Imamate's forces into the forests of Chechnya. The Imamate's forces surround the Russian column, destroying it. This destroyed Vorontsov's attempt to cut away Chechnya from the Imamate, which was his plan.

Shamil is showing great activity this year and he is forced to do this, since we ... are taking measures that must sooner or later ... destroy his influence and tear away the Chechens from him, without which he will be nothing.

— Count Mikhail Vorontsov

His fortunes as a military leader rose after he was joined by Hadji Murad, who defected from the Russians in 1841 and tripled by his fighting the area under Shamil's control within a short time. Hadji Murad, who was to become the subject of a famous novella by Leo Tolstoy (1904), turned against Shamil a decade later, apparently disappointed by his failure to be anointed Shamil's successor as imam. Shamil's elder son was given that nomination, and in a secret council, Shamil had his lieutenant accused of treason and sentenced to death, on which Hadji Murad, on learning of the judgement, redefected to the Russians.

Although Shamil hoped that Britain, France, or the Ottoman Empire would come to his aid to drive Russia from the Caucasus, this never happened. After the Crimean War, Russia redoubled its efforts against the Imamate. Now successful, Russian forces severely reduced the Imamate's territory, and by September 1859, Shamil surrendered. Though the main theater closed, conflict in the eastern Caucasus would continue for several more years.

== Last years ==
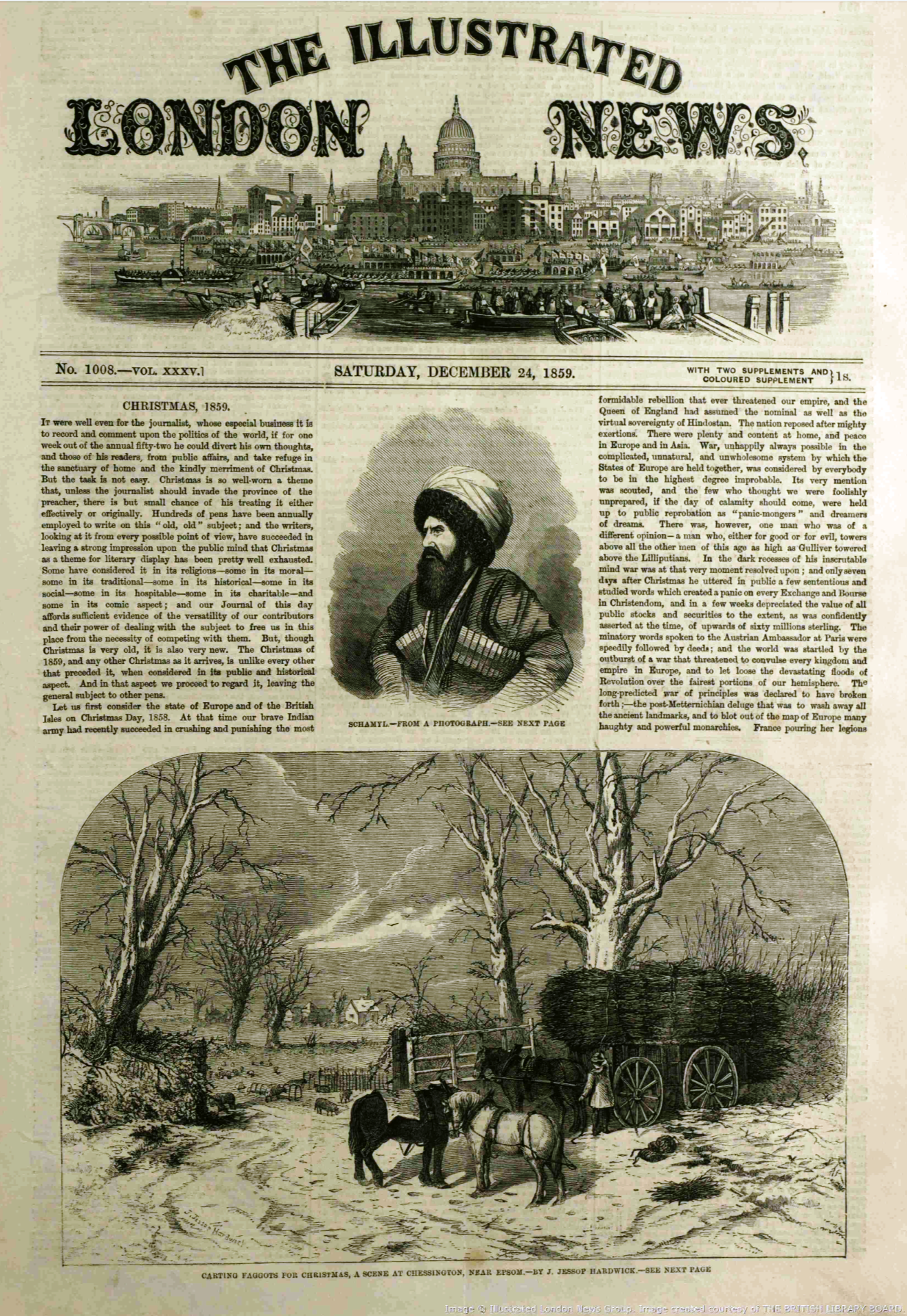
Shamil (front page). Illustrated London News of December 24, 1859.

After his capture, Shamil was sent to Saint Petersburg to meet the Tsar Alexander II. Afterwards, he was exiled to Kaluga, then a small town near Moscow. After several years in Kaluga he complained to the authorities about the climate and in December 1868 Shamil received permission to move to Kyiv a commercial center of the Empire's southwest. In Kyiv he was afforded a mansion in Aleksandrovskaya Street. The Imperial authorities ordered the Kyiv superintendent to keep Shamil under "strict but not overly burdensome surveillance" and allotted the city a significant sum for the needs of the exile. Shamil seemed to have liked his luxurious detainment, as well as the city; this is confirmed by the letters he sent from Kyiv.

In 1859 Shamil wrote to his naib, Muhammadamin: "By the will of the Almighty, the Absolute Governor, I have fallen into the hands of unbelievers ... the Great Emperor ... has settled me here ... in a tall spacious house with carpets and all the necessities."

In 1869 he was given permission to perform the Hajj to the holy city of Mecca. He traveled first from Kyiv to Odesa and then sailed to Istanbul, where he was greeted by Ottoman Sultan Abdulaziz. He became a guest at the Imperial Topkapı Palace for a short while and left Istanbul on a ship reserved for him by the Sultan. In Mecca, during the pilgrimage, he met and conversed with Emir Abdelkader. After completing his pilgrimage to Mecca, he died in Medina in 1871 while visiting the city, and was buried in the Jannatul Baqi, a historical graveyard in Medina where many prominent personalities from Islamic history are interred. Imam had five sons and five daughters. Shamil's eldest son, Jamaluddin, whom grow up in russian captivity became an imperial army oficer, cornette. He returned to his father side in 1855, and died in 1858 due to ilness, aged 29. His second eldest son, Gazi-Muhammad followed his father into Kaluga exile, although was prohibited to join him in Mecca. After his father death he left Russia to join Ottoman forces, and went on to become a general in the Ottoman army, retiring as mushir. His third son, Said died in childhood durning the battle of Ahulgo. The fourth son, Muhammad-Shafi who remained in Russia, rose to rank of a general in the russian military. His youngest son Muhammad-Kamil, born in Kaluga, left Russian empire alongside his brother, joining the army and becoming commander as well.

His oldest daughters Peet'mat(Fatima) and Nafisat married Abdurakhman and Abdurakhim from Gazikumukh, Shamil companions and sons of respected Sheikh Jamaluddin of Kazikumukh, who was his teacher and father in law. Nafisat died in Kaluga, while others joined their father in his hadj. Najavat married Daud, son of Muhammad Amin, both died young. Sapiyat died before her father, in 1870, in Medina. His youngest daughter Bahu-Mesedu also died in foreign land. None of them lived to even reach the age of 30. None (with the exception of the eldest – Nafisat) left any descendants.

Said Shamil, a son of Muhammad-Kamil, grandson of Imam Shamil, became one of the founders of the Mountainous Republic of the Northern Caucasus, which was founded in 1917 and survived until 1920, when it was conquered by Soviet Russia. Forced to leave the region, in 1924 he established the "Committee of Independence of the Caucasus" in Germany.

== Legacy ==
=== Russian historiography ===
While Russia had managed to conquer Chechnya and Dagestan in a series of bloody conquests, Russians had developed a great respect for Shamil. Tsar Alexander II of Russia had openly admired his resistance, thus in the later part of his life, Shamil was permitted for Hajj by the Russian authorities.

Shamil's career and legacy continue to be studied by Russian authorities and academics despite his defiance to Russian power. An entomologist with reformist ideas named a large swift moth after him.

=== Musical composition ===
At a gathering in 1958, the Lubavitcher Rebbe told a story about a great tribal leader named Shamil, who was rebelling against the persecuting Russian forces. Lured by a false peace treaty, he was captured and exiled. During his exile, he composed a heartfelt, wordless song emoting his rise, downfall and yearning for freedom. The song was seemingly heard by a passing Hasid, the melody remained obscure until the Rebbe taught it at the above-mentioned gathering. The song uncharacteristically was adopted by the Chabad movement (who usually compose their own melodies), as they take the deeper meaning of its stanzas as an analogy for the soul, which descends to a world of mortality and physicality, trapped in a body, knowing that it will one day return to its maker. (Another song uncharacteristically adapted by the Chabad movement is the tune of the La Marseillaise, which was put to the tune of the prayer Ho'aderes V'hoemunah.)

== See also ==
- Caucasian War
- Russian conquest of Chechnya and Dagestan
- Russo-Circassian War
- Murtazeki
- Sayyid Abdurrahman
