= Gimry =

Gimry Гимры
- Selo

Other transcription(s)
  - Avar: Генуб
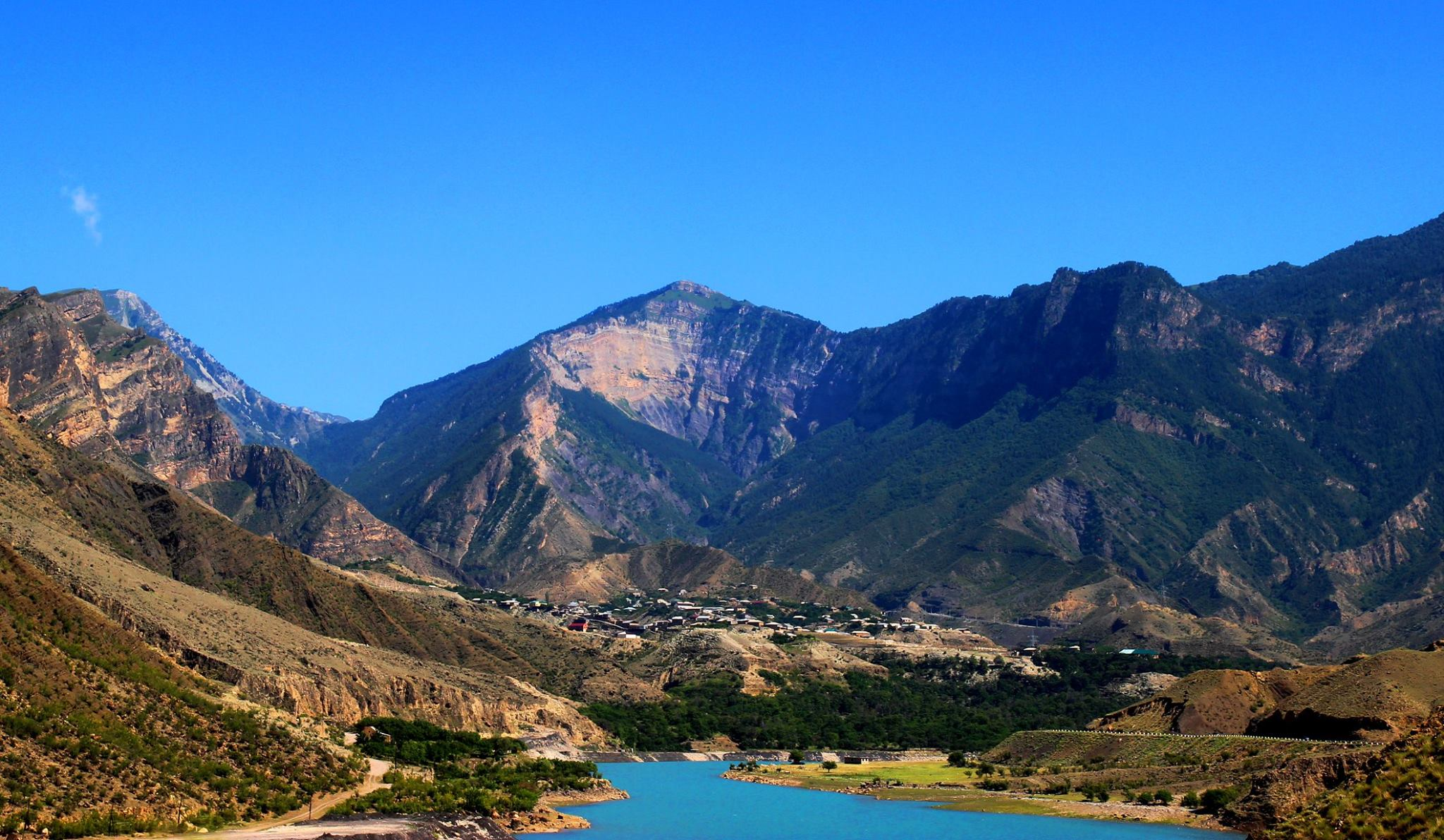
- View of Gimry

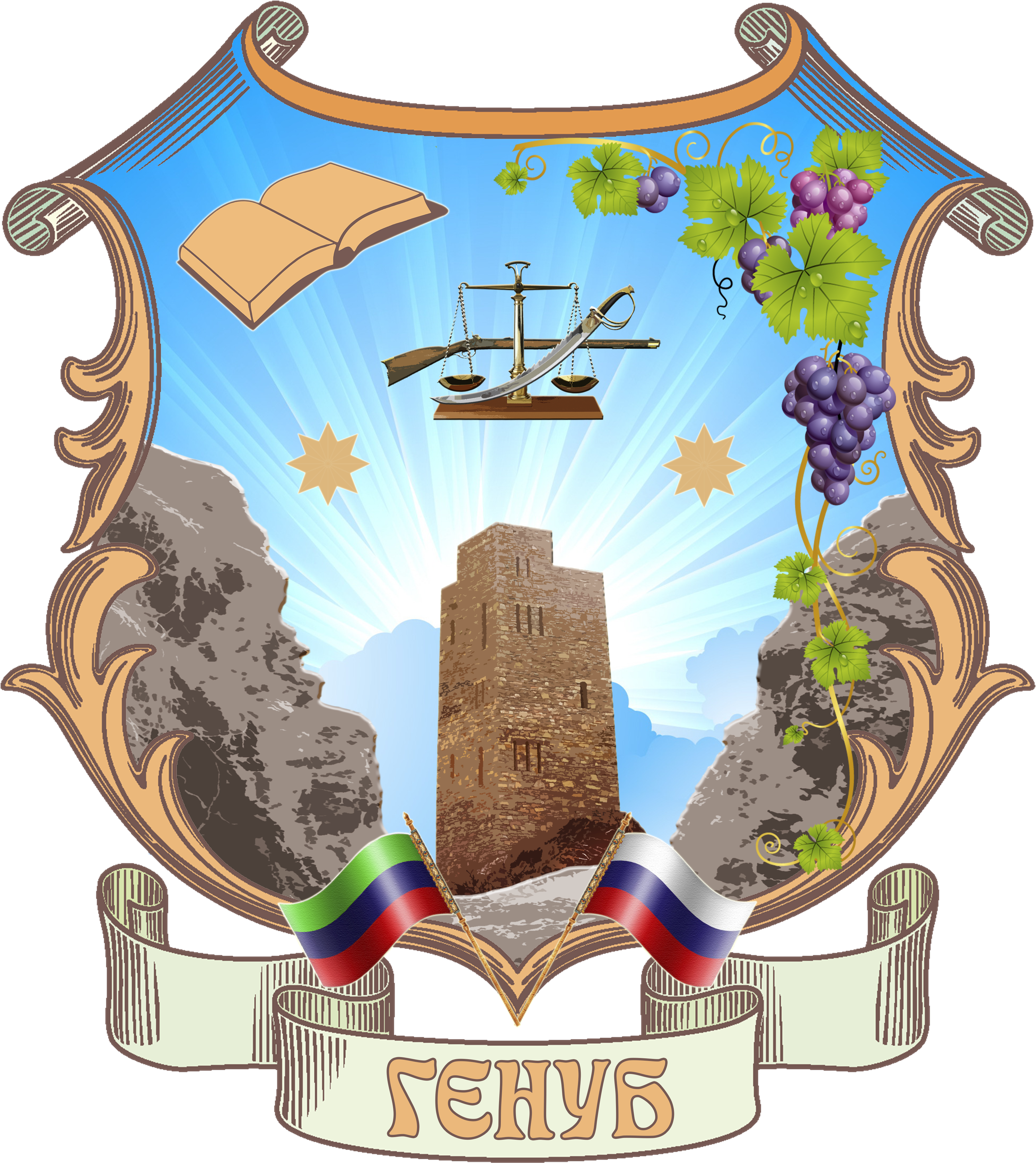
- Coat of arms
- Interactive map of Gimry
- Location of Gimry Gimry (Republic of Dagestan)
- Coordinates: 42°45′26″N 46°50′44″E
- Country: Russia
- Federal subject: Dagestan
- Administrative district: Untsukulsky District

Population (2010 Census)
  - Total: 4,654
  - Estimate (2025): 5,365 (+15.3%)
- Time zone: UTC+3 (MSK)
- Postal code: 368951
- Dialing code: +7 87257
- OKTMO ID: 82653420101

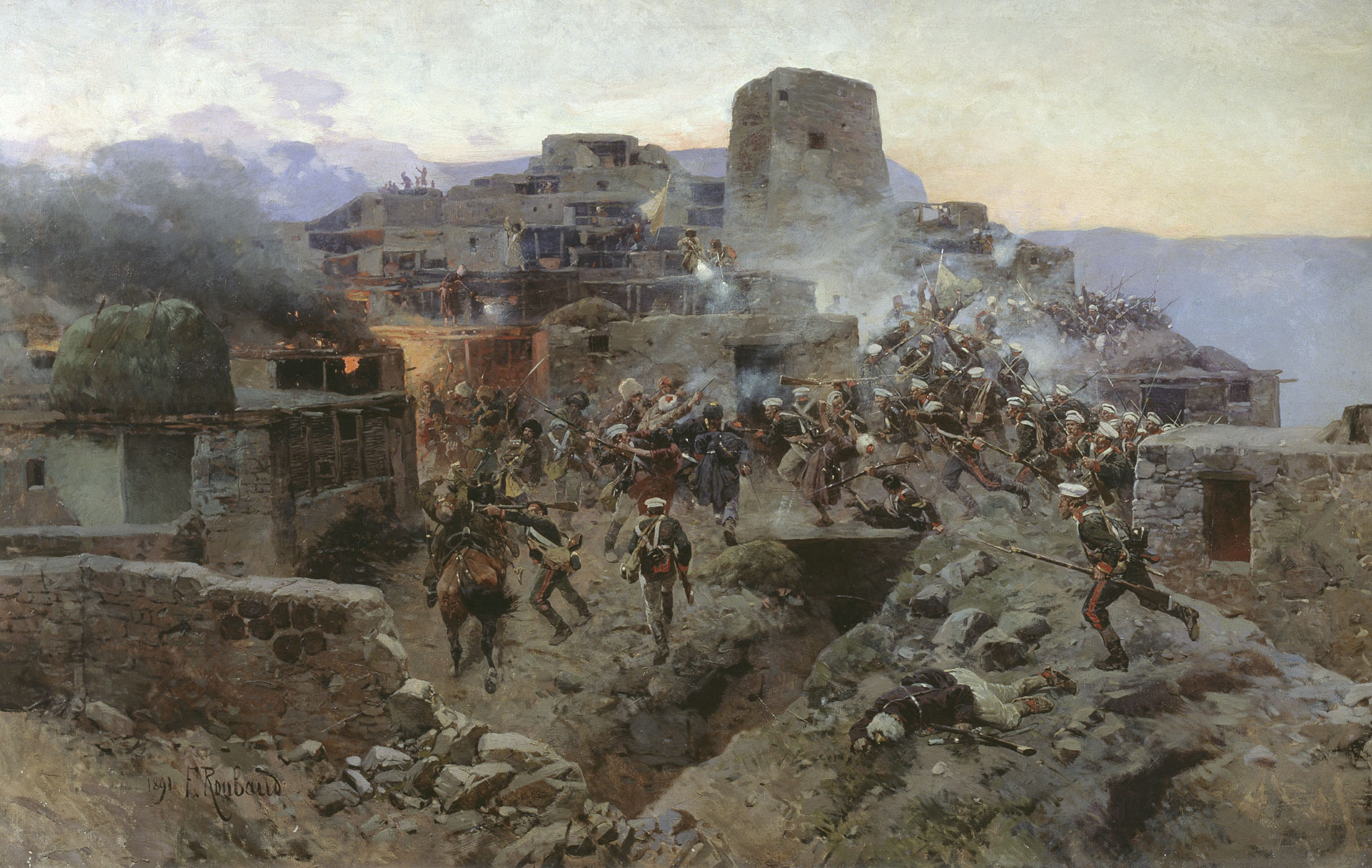
Assault of Gimry – Franz Roubaud, (1891), oil on canvas

Gimry (Russian: Гимры, Avar: Генуб, romanized: Genub) is a rural locality (a selo) in Untsukulsky District of the Republic of Dagestan, Russia. It is known as the birthplace of two Dagestani imams, Ghazi Muhammad and Shamil, who resisted Russian expansion into the region in the nineteenth century. Population: 4,654 (2010 census); 3,362 (2002 census).

== Geography ==
Gimry is located on the east bank of the north-flowing Avar Koysu river at the bottom of a 5000-foot-deep canyon. On the east side the upper 1500 feet are nearly vertical. It is at the mouth of a side canyon that extends about 7 kilometers southeast. In the nineteenth century the only approaches from the east were from the village of Karanai and along the sides of the Sulak and Avar Koysu canyons or by a path down to the side canyon where the Gimry tunnel is now. Four kilometers north the Avar Koysu joins the east-flowing Andi Koysu to form the Sulak River. To the south on the Avar Koysu is the village of Untsokul, the Irganay dam and the villages of Irganay and Zirani. West on the Andi Koysu are the rock fortress of Akhulgo and the villages of Ashitla and Igali.

== History ==
Gimry was part of a group of villages called or Koysubu or Hindal. It was a center of resistance to Russia during the Caucasian War (1829–1859). Both Ghazi Muhammad and Shamil were born here in the 1790s. In 1830, Russian commander Baron Rosen unsuccessfully tried to attack the village. In 1832, Ghazi Muhammad died here during the Battle of Gimry. In 1834, Lanskoy attacked Gimry. In 1837, the Russians were defeated just to the north at the battle of the Ashitla bridge. Later in the same year the village of Ashitla to the west was destroyed. In 1839 it was neutral during the Siege of Akhoulgo. In 1840, Klugenau attacked it. After 1840, the center of resistance moved northwest to the forests of Chechnya. During the Dagestan Uprising (1920) ninety percent of the buildings were destroyed by artillery. Its surrender in late February 1921 was almost the end of the uprising.

=== Recent events ===
In 2014, Russian soldiers tried to capture Gimry native Magomed Suleymanov, who had been proclaimed emir of the Caucasus Emirate. Gimry remained blocked by Russian troops to all except its residents for a while. As of October 2015, each resident had to give a 5-digit number to enter or leave town, while all others had to register and foreigners were not permitted.

== See also ==
- Gimry fighting
