= Andi Koysu =

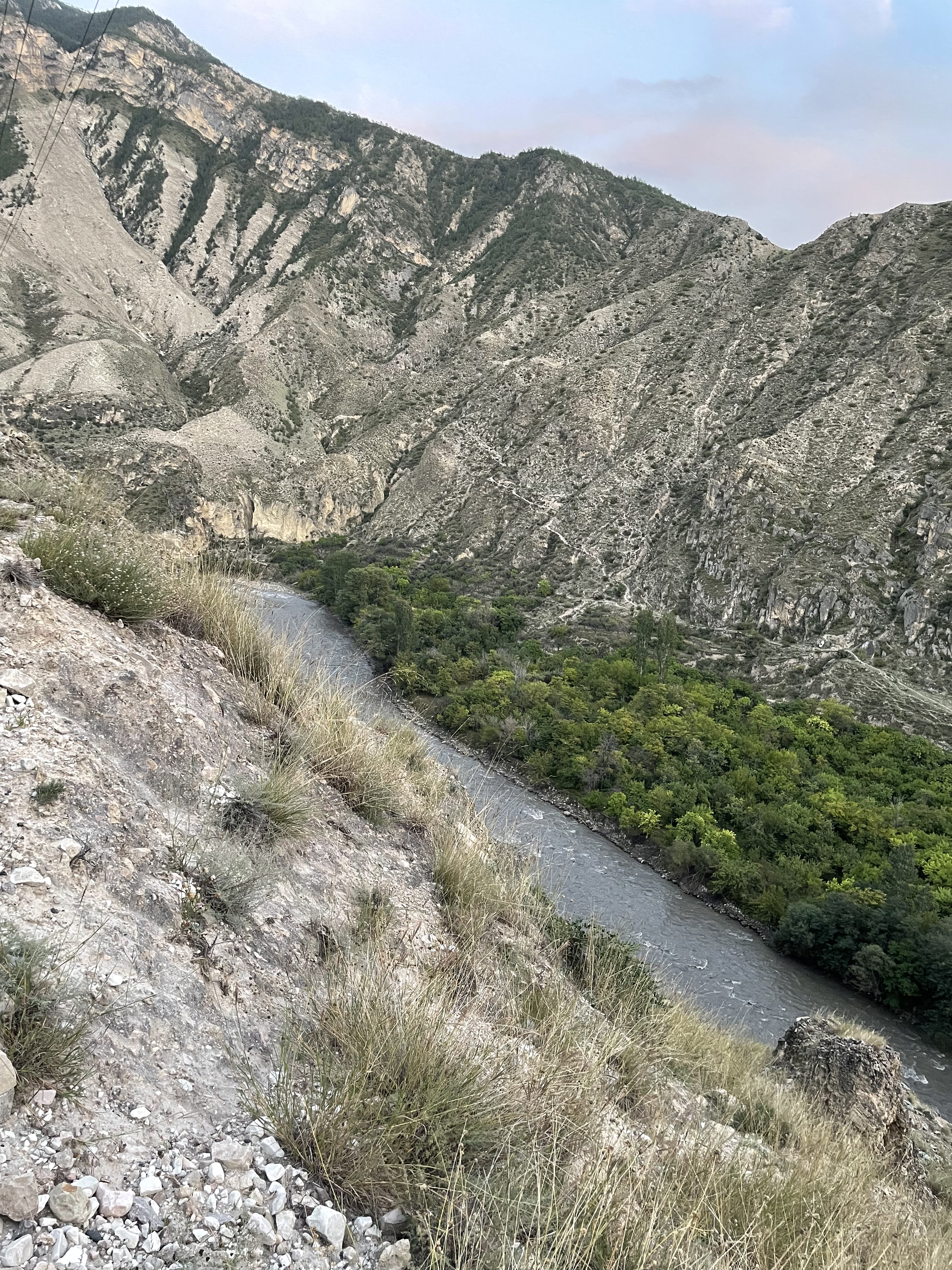

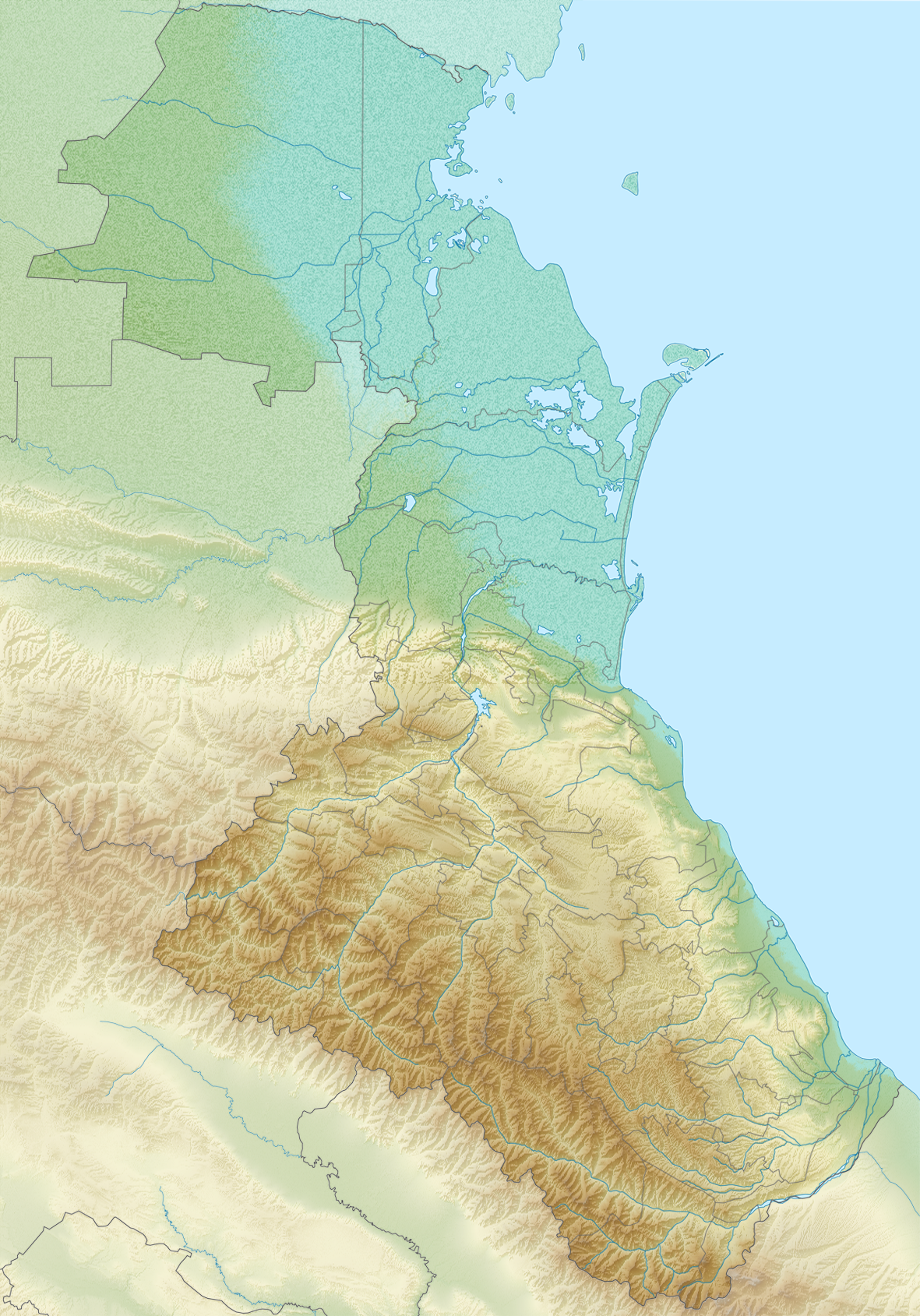
- Location within Republic of Dagestan Location within Georgia

Location
- Countries: Georgia; Russia

Physical characteristics
- Source
  - location: confluence of Pirikiti Alazani and Tushetis Alazani
  - coordinates: 42.3547°N 45.6585°E
- Mouth
  - location: Sulak
  - coordinates: 42.7906°N 46.7963°E
- Length: 144 km (89 mi)
- Basin size: 4,810 km^{2} (1,860 sq mi)

Basin features
- Progression: Sulak→ Caspian Sea

The Andi Koysu (Russian: Андийское Койсу - Andiyskoye Koysu, Georgian: ანდის ყოისუ - Andis Qoisu) is a river in Dagestan (Russia) and Georgia. It starts at the confluence of the rivers Pirikiti Alazani and Tushetis Alazani, near Omalo in the Tusheti region of Georgia. It is 144 kilometres (89 mi) long or 192 kilometres (119 mi) including its longest source river, Tushetis Alazani, and its drainage basin covers 4,810 square kilometres (1,860 mi^{2}). At its confluence with the Avar Koysu, near the village Gimry in central Dagestan, it forms the river Sulak.
