= Sulak (river) =

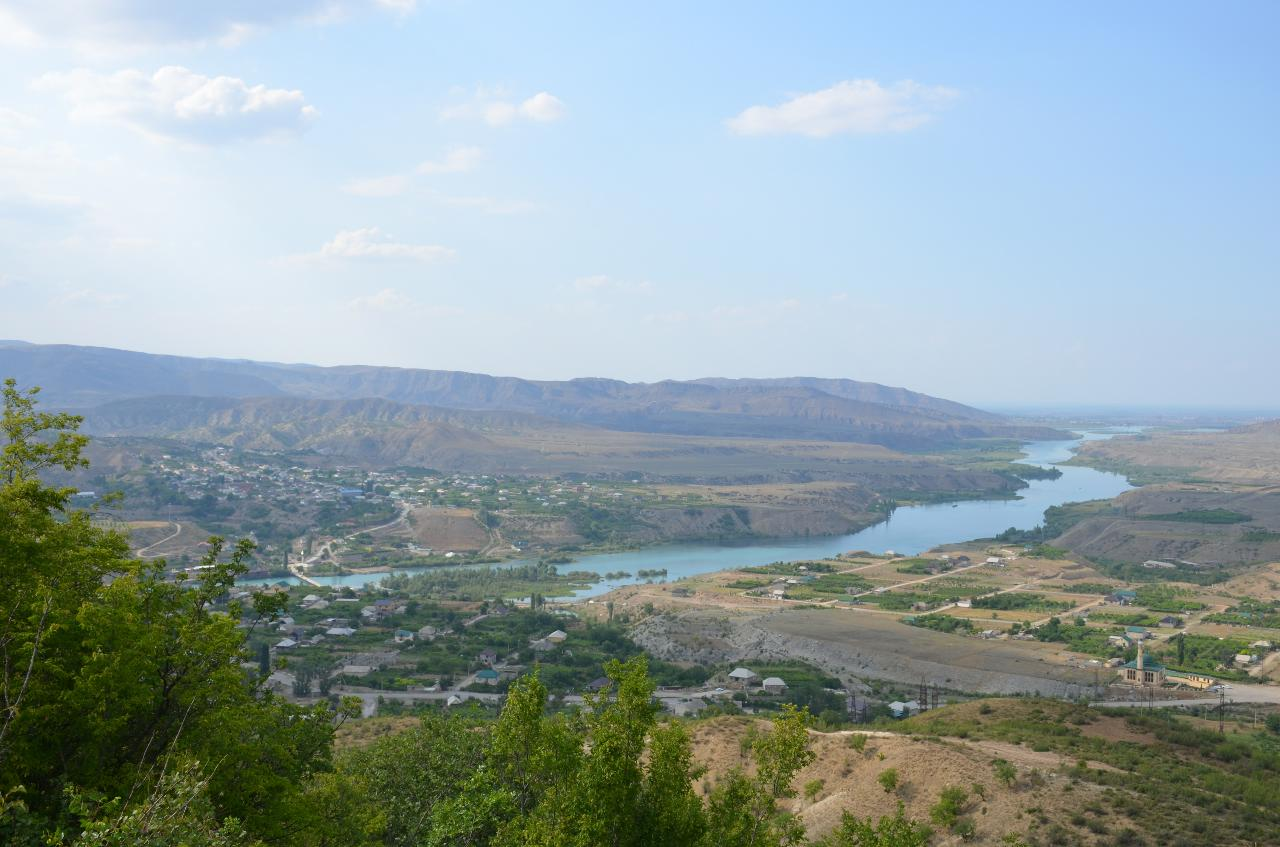
- Sulak River. Dagestan

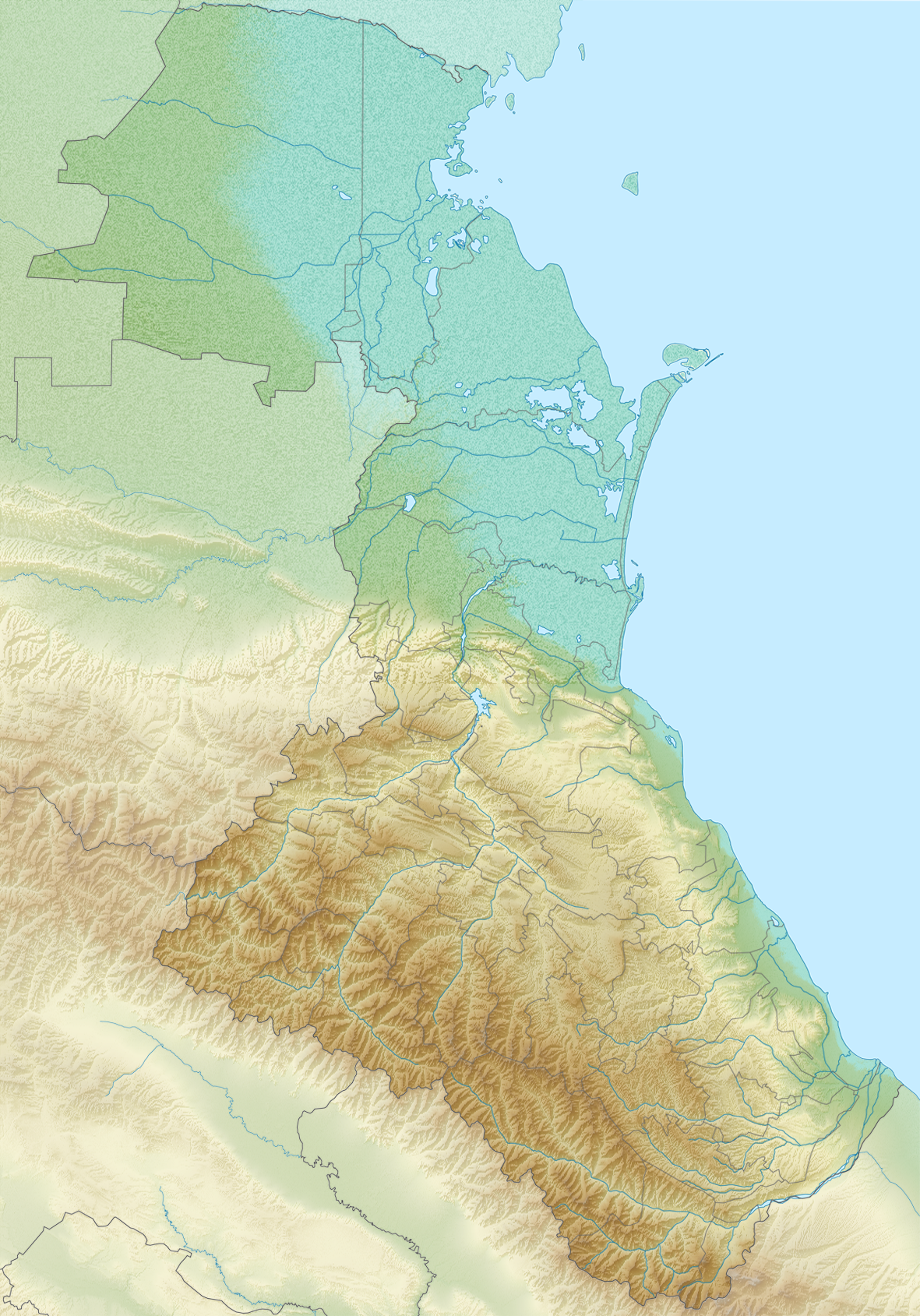

Location
- Country: Russia

Physical characteristics
- Source
  - location: confluence of Avar Koysu and Andi Koysu
- Mouth
  - location: Caspian Sea
  - coordinates: 43.256°N 47.546°E
- Length: 144 km (89 mi)
- Basin size: 15,200 km^{2} (5,900 sq mi)
- Discharge
  - average: 176 m^{3}/s (6,200 cu ft/s)

Basin features
- Tributaries
  - left: Andi Koysu, Aktash
  - right: Avar Koysu

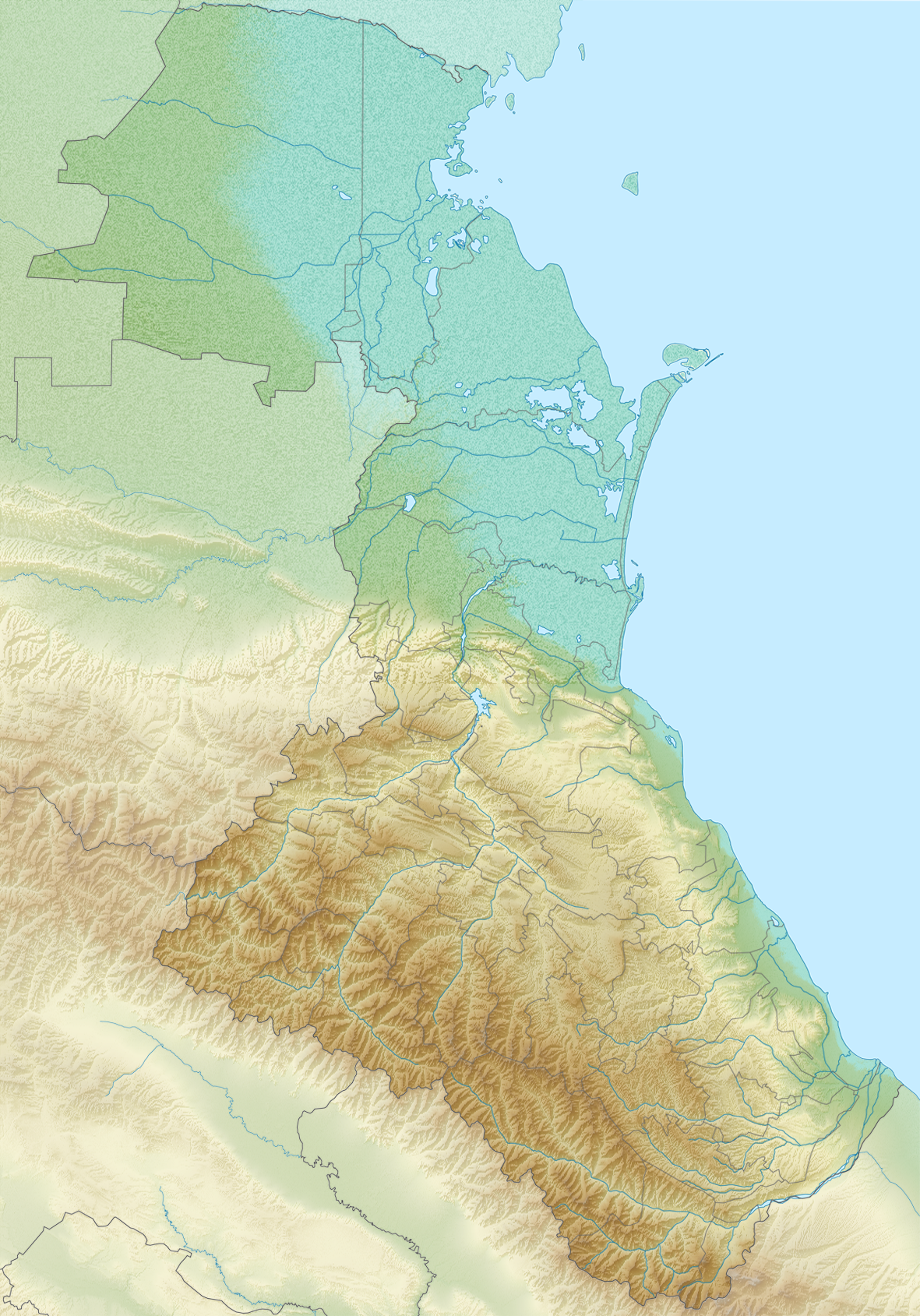
Sulak River and its tributaries

The Sulak (Russian: Сула́к, Kumyk: Сулак (Sulak)/Къой-сув (Qoysuw), Chechen: ГӀойсу, romanized: Ġoysu) drains most of the mountainous interior of Dagestan northeast into the Caspian Sea. It and most of its branches flow in canyons. Its main tributaries are, from north to southeast:

- The Andi Koysu flows north-northeast and joins the Avar Koysu to become the Sulak. A few of its upper tributaries are in Georgia. Near the junction of the two rivers were the Siege of Akhoulgo and the Battle of Gimry.
- The Avar Koysu flows northeast to join the Andi Koysu, forming the Sulak. Its upper tributaries are the northeast flowing Khzanor and the northwest flowing Dzhurmut.
- The Kara Koysu flows northeast and joins the Avar Koysu about 10 km (6.2 mi) northwest of Gergebil. North of Gergebil is the Irgan dam and reservoir. Its long upper tributaries include the Karalazuger, Tleyserukh and Risor.
- The Kazikumukh Koysu flows north and joins the Kara Koysu at Gergebil.

North of the Sulak basin is the Terek basin and south of it is the Samur basin. To the west is the crest of the Main Caucasian Range of the Caucasus Mountains and to the east are many short rivers that flow down into the Caspian.

The Sulak proper starts at the junction of the Andi and Avar Koysus. It flows northeast into the broad Chirkey Reservoir. It then flows northwest through the narrow Miatli canyon and reservoir. It reaches flat country at Miatli and leaves the last mountains just south of Kizilyurt and enters the Terek-Sulak Lowland about 50 km (31 mi) from its source. Here there are meanders, former channels and canals. It flows northeast about 25 km (16 mi), turns east and reaches the Caspian after about 50 km (31 mi). Its delta is a smaller version of the Terek River delta about 66 km (41 mi) north. The lower Sulak supplies water to Makhachkala through a canal.

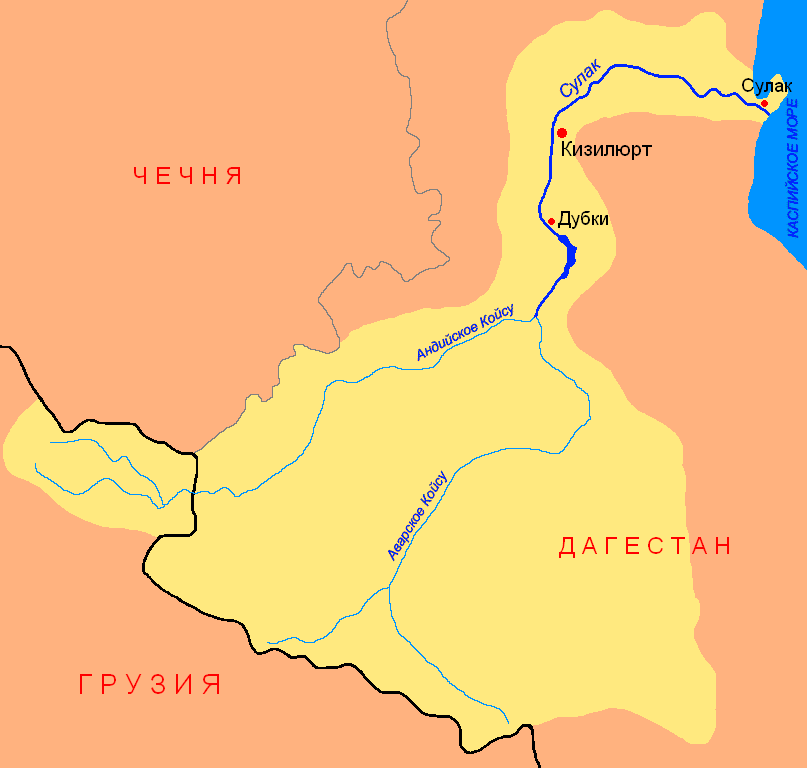
The Sulak Basin

In 1735 the Sulak River was stipulated as defining the boundary between the Russian and the Persian empires.
