= Mekhelta =

Rural locality in Dagestan, Russia

Coordinates: 42°47′56″N 46°29′49″E

Mekhelta (Russian: Мехельта, Avar: МелъелтӀа) is a rural locality (a selo) and the administrative center of Gumbetovsky District of the Republic of Dagestan, Russia. Population: 3,314 (2010 census); 2,707 (2002 census); 2,061 (1989 Soviet census).
