= Gumbetovsky District =

Gumbetovsky District Гумбетовский район (Russian)
- District

Other transcription(s)
  - Avar: Бакълъул мухъ
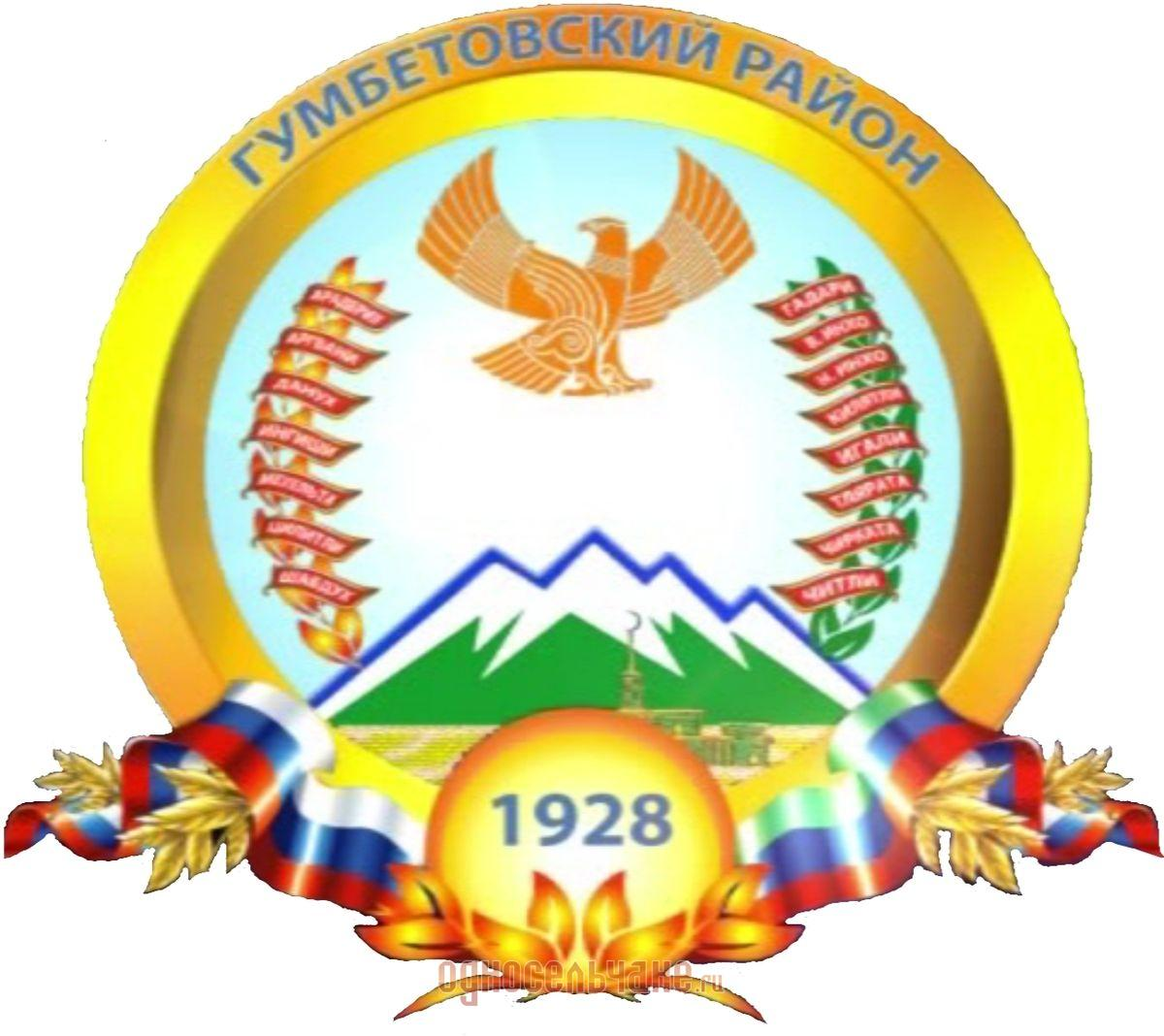
- Coat of arms
- Location of Gumbetovsky District in the Republic of Dagestan
- Coordinates: 42°48′N 46°30′E
- Country: Russia
- Federal subject: Republic of Dagestan
- Established: 1928
- Administrative center: Mekhelta

Area
  - Total: 730 km^{2} (280 sq mi)

Population (2010 Census)
  - Total: 22,046
  - Density: 30/km^{2} (78/sq mi)
  - Urban: 0%
  - Rural: 100%

Administrative structure
  - Administrative divisions: 6 Selsoviets
  - Inhabited localities: 27 rural localities

Municipal structure
  - Municipally incorporated as: Gumbetovsky Municipal District
  - Municipal divisions: 0 urban settlements, 15 rural settlements
- Time zone: UTC+3 (MSK)
- OKTMO ID: 82615000
- Website: http://www.mo-gumbet.ru

Population of Gumbetovsky District
- 2010 Census: 22,046
- 2002 Census: 18,177
- 1989 Census: 11,317
- 1979 Census: 13,180

Gumbetovsky District (Russian: Гумбе́товский райо́н; Avar: Бакълъул мухъ) is an administrative and municipal district (raion), one of the forty-one in the Republic of Dagestan, Russia. It is located in the west of the republic. The area of the district is 730 square kilometers (280 sq mi). Its administrative center is the rural locality (a selo) of Mekhelta. As of the 2010 Census, the total population of the district was 22,046, with the population of Mekhelta accounting for 15.0% of that number.

== Administrative and municipal status ==
Within the framework of administrative divisions, Gumbetovsky District is one of the forty-one in the Republic of Dagestan. The district is divided into six selsoviets which comprise twenty-seven rural localities. As a municipal division, the district is incorporated as Gumbetovsky Municipal District. Its six selsoviets are incorporated as fifteen rural settlements within the municipal district. The selo of Mekhelta serves as the administrative center of both the administrative and municipal district.
