= Najmuddin of Gotzo =

North Caucasian religious, military, and political leader (1859–1925)

- هوخسا نازمودن; ХӀоцоса Нажмудин
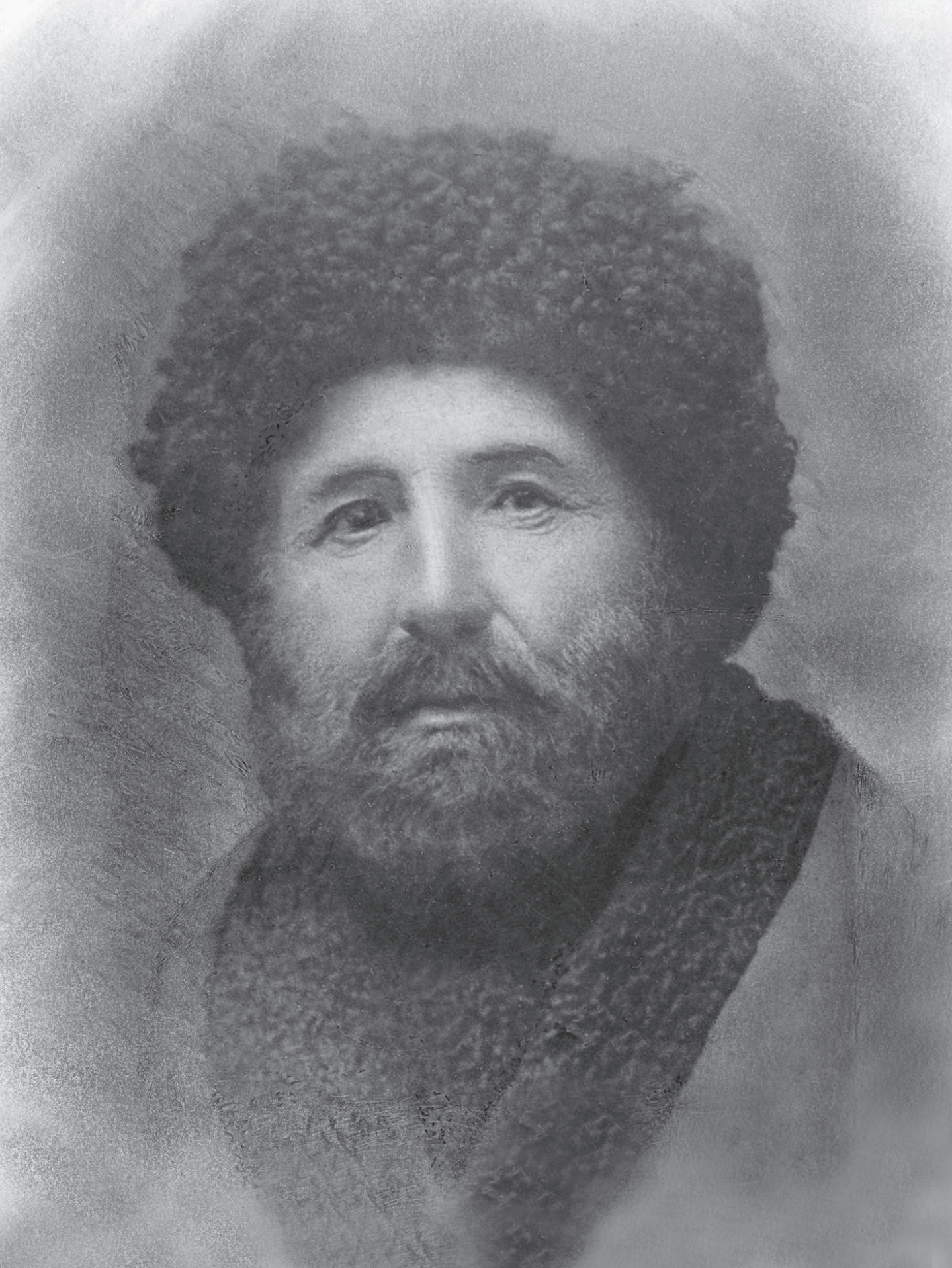
- Najmuddin in the 1910s
- Title: Mufti; Naib

Personal life
- Born: 1859 Gotsob, Dagestan Oblast, Caucasus Viceroyalty (now Republic of Dagestan, Russia)
- Died: October 1925 (aged 65–66) Rostov-on-Don, Azov-Black Sea Krai, Russian SFSR, Soviet Union (now Rostov Oblast, Russia)
- Cause of death: Execution by shooting
- Region: North Caucasus

Religious life
- Religion: Sunni Islam
- Denomination: Sufism
- Sect: Naqshbandi

Senior posting
- Based in: Vladikavkaz; Temir-Khan-Shura
- Post: Mufti of the North Caucasus
- Period in office: 1917–1920

Imam of Dagestan and Chechnya
- In office May 1918 – c. 1921; Disputed with Uzun-Hajji (May 1919 – 30 March 1920)
- Monarch: Said Shamil (from 1920)
- Preceded by: Position re-established Himself (1917)
- Succeeded by: Position abolished
- In office 17 August 1917 – 20 August 1917
- Preceded by: Position re-established Alibek-Hajji (1878)
- Succeeded by: Position abolished

Military service
- Allegiance: Mountainous Republic of the Northern Caucasus
- Battles/wars: Russian Civil War; Dagestan uprising; 1924–1925 Chechen uprising (executed)

Najmuddin of Gotzo (Note: Avar: ХӀоцоса Нажмудин, romanized: Ħoꞩosa Naƶmudin, Arabic: هوخسا نازمودن; Arabic: نجم الدين بن محمد بن دنوغونه الحزى الداغستانى, romanized: Najm al-Dīn ibn Muḥammad ibn Danughwnh al-Ḥuzá al-Dāghstāná; Russian: Нажмуди́н Гоци́нский, romanized: Nazhmudin Gotsinsky.) (Note: Also known in Russian as Nazhmudin Donogo (Russian: Нажмудин Доного).) (1859 – October 1925) was a North Caucasian religious, military, and political leader who led multiple uprisings against the Bolsheviks during and after the Russian Civil War. A poet and teacher of Arabic prior to the Russian Revolution, Najmuddin first served as Mufti of the Mountainous Republic of the Northern Caucasus.

Najmuddin was born into a family of landowning nobles who had defected from the Caucasian Imamate of Imam Shamil. Prior to the Russian Revolution, he was part of both the ulama and the Russian government, and he was briefly a bureaucrat for the Russian Provisional Government following the February Revolution. Najmuddin led a series of rebellions in both Dagestan and Chechnya against Russian authorities, seeking to establish an independent Islamic theocracy in the North Caucasus under his leadership. Following the failure of a 1924–1925 insurgency in Chechnya led by Najmuddin, he was captured by the Red Army in September 1925. He was then executed by the Soviet government.

== Early life and career ==
Najmuddin (Note: Prior to the Russian Revolution, many people from the North Caucasus lacked surnames.) was born in 1859 in the village of Gotsob, in the Russian Empire's Dagestan Oblast to an aristocratic family. His Avar father, Muhammad Donogo, had been a naib under Imam Shamil that defected to the Russian government, becoming a high-ranking military officer and significant landowner as a result of his defection. Najmuddin's mother was an ethnic Kumyk from the village of Nizhny Dzhengutay. Najmuddin's elder brother, Abdulatip, was a teacher of Islamic theology. Najmuddin followed his brother into a religious career, joining the ulama after receiving a religious education.

Najmuddin joined the court of Nikolay Chavchavadze as a horse trainer on 19 December 1880, after completing his formal education. The next year, he became an employee of the court of Dagestan Oblast. He worked at the court until 1895, leaving the job with the police rank of Junker. He next was naib of Koisubu Prefecture within the Avar District of Dagestan Oblast, the same office his father had held, from 1895 to 1903. Alibek Ṭahaq̇adiqala, a Bolshevik revolutionary in Dagestan during the Russian Civil War, later claimed that Najmuddin was on one occasion removed from office and imprisoned for seven months after inflicting injury upon a thief as punishment for stealing. This thief was popularly claimed to be Mahmud of Kakhabroso, an Avar poet and later Bolshevik revolutionary. Mahmud later criticised Najmuddin in a satirical poem as greedy and an infidel.

Following the deaths of his father and brother, Najmuddin inherited large tracts of land, including 10,000 sheep across both mountainous and lowland pastures. He defended his inheritance, saying that if claims were filed in sharia court against the argument that his father had honourably obtained the land, he would voluntarily surrender it.

Najmuddin travelled to the Ottoman Empire on the permission of the Russian government briefly in 1903. There, he engaged in writing literature, particularly poetry. This was the first time he ever ventured beyond the borders of the Russian Empire, and it would prove to be the only such time. While in the Ottoman Empire, Najmuddin met Muhammad Zapir, a religious educator to Sultan Abdul Hamid II, and a meeting was arranged between the two. The meeting primarily concerned the conditions of Muslims living under the Russian Empire, and Najmuddin requested permission to become imam of Dagestan. Abdul Hamid agreed to Najmuddin's request, but noted that it was impossible to fulfil, as Dagestan was then under the control of Russia. He urged Najmuddin to "try, [and] if you succeed, it will be very good."

Upon his return, Najmuddin became a teacher at a kuttab in the Avar District. During the 1906 Russian legislative election he stood in the Temir-Khan-Shura District as a candidate for a deputy, as he owned land in the district. However, due to extremely low turnout in Dagestan Oblast, the provincial executive bureau decided against sending any deputies to the State Duma of the Russian Empire of the First Convocation. At this time, Najmuddin, who had begun to partake in protests against the Russian government, came under the suspicion of the state, which suspected him of being an Ottoman spy and receiving weapons from the Ottoman government so that he would organise a rebellion. Sigismund Volsky, governor of Dagestan Oblast, accused him of leading the Dagestan movement, and sought to have him sent into internal exile.

On the eve of the Russian Revolution, Najmuddin was publicly known in Dagestan and Chechnya for his devotion to charity. During Islamic holidays, he slaughtered his sheep and distributed the meat to the poor. He also had a reputation as someone who sought to minimise ethnic conflicts between Chechens and Dagestanis. Xalilbeg Musajasul, an Avar artist who was acquainted with Najmuddin, noted that despite his wealth, he personally was characterised as a simple, humane, and kind individual.

== Revolution and the Mountainous Republic ==
Najmuddin supported the 1917 February Revolution, and after the revolution's success he became a member of the Dagestan Oblast Provisional Executive Committee, based in Temir-Khan-Shura. Soon after the revolution, two mutually-hostile political groups formed, each vying for power: the Dagestan Socialist Group, which claimed to speak "in the interests of the workers", and the Dagestan National Committee, which was led by Najmuddin. Najmuddin sharply criticised the Bolsheviks, whose ideology he felt was antithetical to Islamic values. At the same time, he distanced himself politically from the nobility, particularly in matters of land, urging adherence to Islamic courts in order to solve land disputes. Najmuddin had confidence that supporters of the now-deposed Empire would come to his side, believing that they would need his support more than he needed theirs. Magomed Dzhafarov, a colonel of the Imperial Russian Army and the military of the Mountainous Republic of the Northern Caucasus, remarked that Najmuddin was intelligent, proud and arrogant, and that he was well-connected to the working class despite his wealth. Dzhafarov noted that none of the many aalimath of the Caucasus had a level of fame equivalent to Najmuddin, particularly in highland regions.

Najmuddin attended the First Congress of the Union of Highlanders of the North Caucasus, which took place in May 1917 in Vladikavkaz. There, he was appointed as mufti of the North Caucasus and as a member of the Central Committee of the Union of Highlanders of the North Caucasus. Following his appointment as mufti, Najmuddin delivered a message to the population in which he called for unity and announced that any measures against sharia would be prosecuted to the strongest possible extent. Alibek Ṭahaq̇adiqala, a member of the Central Committee from the Socialist Group, assessed Najmuddin's move not as one of a religious fanatic, but as a carefully-calculated step performed to achieve support from the people. Najmuddin secured another victory at the congress's conclusion by successfully lobbying for the next such meeting to be held in the highland village of Andi. He argued that such a location would be fitting for the movement to deliberate, but ulterior motives also played a role: Andi was located in Avar territory, where his influence was stronger than anywhere else in the Caucasus.

Among Najmuddin's closest political allies was sheikh Uzun-Hajji, who travelled across the North Caucasus spreading propaganda in favour of a theocracy. Uzun-Hajji's vision was the establishment of a sharia state with Najmuddin as leader, similar to Imam Shamil's Caucasian Imamate. Dzhafarov wrote that Najmuddin had initially been slow to act politically, before being forced into doing so by the more enthusiastic Uzun-Hajji. Further impetuses emerged from the victory of the Socialist Group in the local elections, which had alarmed supporters of sharia into forming militias. Uzun-Hajji gathered five thousand Najmuddin loyalists in Andi from the Dagestani highlands and Chechnya prior to the beginning of the Andi Congress. Presented with what seemed to be a fait accompli, the liberal intellectuals among the Union of Highlanders of the North Caucasus agreed to attend, while scheduling another conference for a later date.

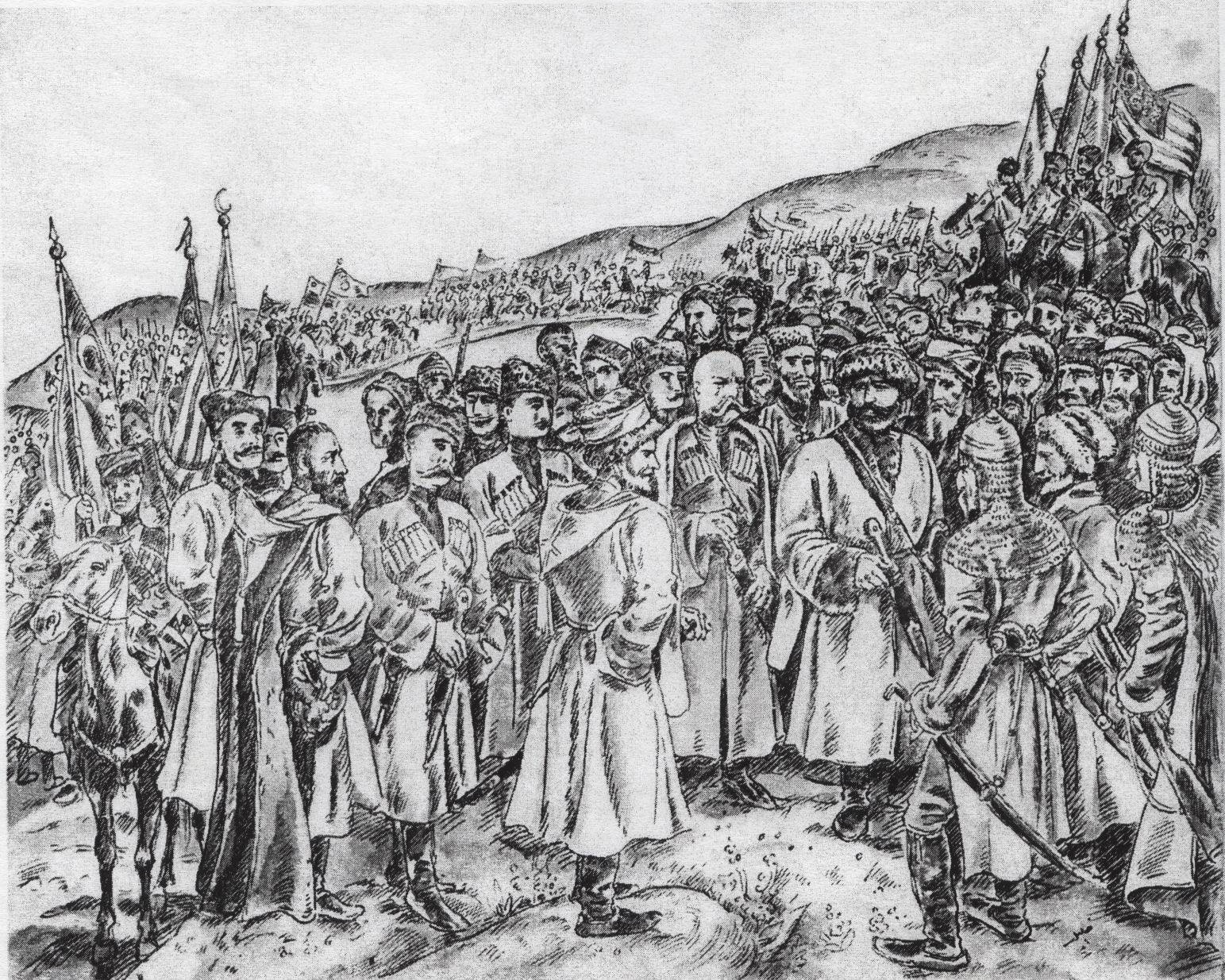
Najmuddin of Gotzo's Appointment as Imam in Andi, a 1917 drawing by Xalilbeg Musajasul of the titular event

On 17 August 1917, Najmuddin was formally appointed as Imam of Dagestan and Chechnya at a ceremony on Lake Kezenoyam during the congress. Upon his accession to the role, Najmuddin stated in a message to the people:

Beware of crimes prohibited by Allah: murder, theft, robbery, plunder. Obey your aalimath, gather soldiers capable of defending freedom and sharia. Give freedom of religion to Christians and other non-believers, and do not cause harm to the Russian soldiers who gave us this freedom.

His tenure as imam would be short-lived, however. Three days later, he was instructed to give up his title by the congress's attendees, who were largely religious Muslims that shared Najmuddin's opposition to the intellectuals. Those attending feared that a restoration of Shamil's Imamate would encourage sectarian enmity and bloodshed between the North Caucasus, Azerbaijan, and Georgia. At the Second Congress on 21 August, Najmuddin's status as mufti, rather than imam, was affirmed.

Najmuddin was elected to the Russian Constituent Assembly in the 1917 Russian Constituent Assembly election, and he continued to express support for strengthened relations between Muslims and non-Muslims as mufti. He publicly urged Highlanders against attacking Russians, Georgians, or Jews. In the face of a wave of abrek attacks that had begun following the February Revolution, Najmuddin declared that those who attacked Christians would be executed, an edict that was not applied to those who attacked Muslims. He justified the decision as one taken to prevent the destruction of the peaceful co-existence between the Highlanders and their neighbours. He also formed a military unit intended to fight abreks, and in a 5 November 1917 khutbah in Gudermes he condemned increasing levels of violence committed by abreks.

In January 1918, Najmuddin and other members of the National Committee marched on Temir-Khan-Shura with the intention of appointing Najmuddin imam. Following Friday prayer, supporters of Najmuddin declared him as imam. After a few days, however, he again backed down and returned to the office of mufti. Upset with Najmuddin's indecisiveness, Uzun-Hajji abandoned him with his army for the highlands.

== Civil war ==
=== Resistance against the Bolsheviks ===
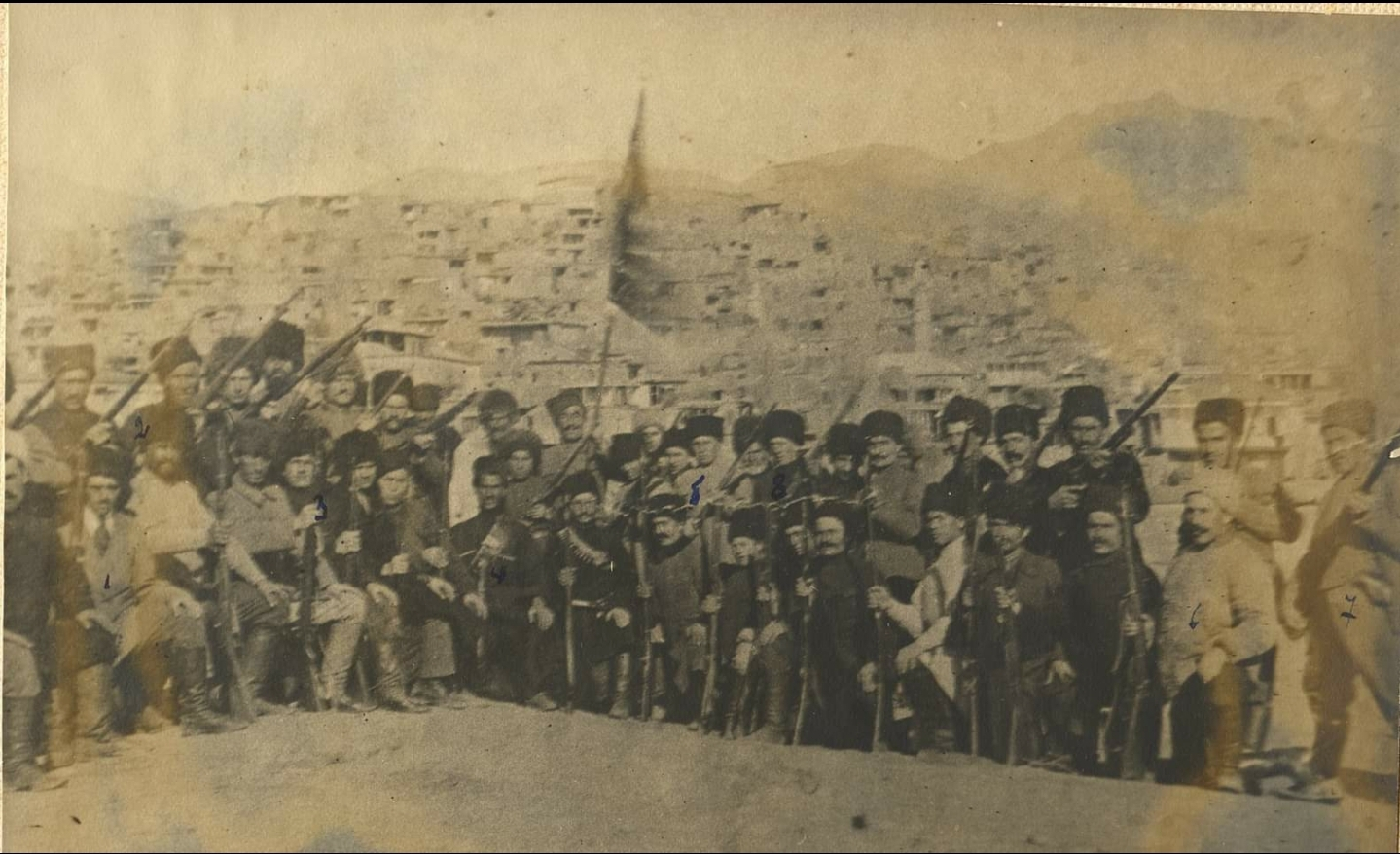
Anti-communist forces loyal to the Mountainous Republic of the Northern Caucasus in Port-Petrovsk, April 1918

The Bolsheviks entered the North Caucasus in 1918, forming a detachment from loyalists in the city of Port-Petrovsk (now Makhachkala). On 23 March 1918, the Armed Forces of Dagestan Executive Committee urged Najmuddin to stabilise the city after pushing the Bolsheviks out, to which he agreed. Najmuddin subsequently established his headquarters in the city, and he began to enforce sharia. Simultaneously, inter-ethnic clashes between Armenians and Azerbaijanis began in Baku. Najmuddin ordered the Armed Forces of Dagestan Executive Committee to travel south and support the Muslim Azerbaijanis. On the way to Baku, the executive committee was defeated, and the Red Army subsequently launched a second push for the city, successfully taking it. Najmuddin fled to Temir-Khan-Shura.

The next decision taken by the executive committee was to travel to Port-Petrovsk in order to obtain Red Army plans. Upon being told of this, Najmuddin elected to join the army on their way to obtain the plans. In the subsequent battle, the army was again defeated, leading to another retreat. At this point, the majority of the Temir-Khan-Shura District now under the control of the Bolsheviks, and the Dargin District was under the control of sheikh Ali-Hajji of Akusha, who had formed an alliance with the Bolsheviks. Two villages in the Dargin District (Khadzhalmakhi and Kuppa), as well as the Avar, Andi, and Gunib districts were under the control of forces loyal to Najmuddin and the returned Uzun-Hajji.

In late May 1918, the leading military commanders of the Mountainous Republic of the Northern Caucasus were gathered in Gunib at Najmuddin's initiative. There, they recognised Najmuddin's authority as Imam of Dagestan and Chechnya, an act which mobilised Highlanders to fight for the republic. A decision was made to launch a three-pronged attack on the Red Army; towards Arakani, in the Kumukh-Tsudakhar direction, and towards Chir-Yurt.

The offensive began with two defeats inflicted by the Red Army at Arkas on 26 May and 5 June. Red Army forces under Sultan-Said Kazbekov also encircled the village of Kostek, where Najmuddin was based, and began shelling. In the resulting battle, both sides sustained heavy losses. On 14 July, Najmuddin's army was attacked outside of Nizhneye Kazanishche, and they were forced to retreat to Arkas. Six days later, they were attacked at Kizlyar, and the Red Army took several prisoners of war, as well as significant amounts of equipment. The tide of the battle began to shift in favour of the Highlanders three days later, when Magomed Dzhafarov forced the Bolsheviks to retreat at the village of Karanay. The next day, Najmuddin's detachment relieved Dzhafarov's forces from Bolshevik pressure at Gimry and Untsukul by forcing the Red Army to retreat.

The Red Army and forces loyal to Najmuddin continued to clash until August 1918, when forces loyal to Lazar Bicherakhov left Baku after the battle for the city and took control of much of the Northern Caucasus. An Ottoman offensive quickly brought an end to Bicherakhov's forces and reestablished the Mountainous Republic. The reestablished republic granted Najmuddin the position of director of sharia affairs in March 1919.

=== Collaboration with the Whites ===
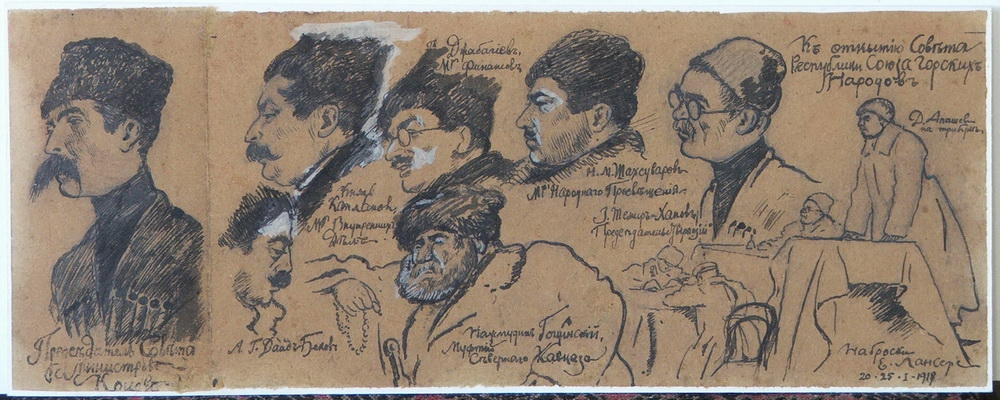
Several North Caucasian politicians as depicted by Eugene Lanceray, 20–25 January 1919. Najmuddin is third from left in the lower row.

The Volunteer Army of White movement leader Anton Denikin entered the North Caucasus in April 1919, invading Chechnya. Najmuddin and the Volunteer Army initially sought to negotiate an agreement. However, after the negotiations broke down, the Whites invaded Dagestan. Amidst the invasion, the government of the Mountainous Republic collapsed, and the state effectively ceased to exist. Mikail Khalilov became the pro-White governor of Dagestan.

Najmuddin was not opposed to the White invasion. He viewed the Mountainous Republic as weak and, while displeased by the Russian occupation, he viewed Denikin as a lesser evil capable of defeating the communists. Najmuddin then wrote to Uzun-Hajji imploring him to join him in an alliance with the Whites and the United Kingdom against the Bolsheviks. Uzun-Hajji refused, writing back, "What difference does it matter if the pig is black or white?" He later reportedly said, "I wanted to make an imam out of him, but he turned out to be an Ivan." However, Hajji-Murad Donogo, a political dissident and historian from Dagestan, has denied that Uzun-Hajji said this.

A meeting in late May 1919 in the village of Botlikh elected to remove Najmuddin as imam and to replace him with Uzun-Hajji. This move was not recognised by Najmuddin or his supporters as legitimate. Uzun-Hajji's resistance against White rule soon led Najmuddin and other pro-Denikin aalimath to condemn Uzun-Hajji and urge Muslims to capture and kill him. According to Dagestani historian Murtazali Dugrichilov, both the Red and White armies sought to divide Najmuddin and Uzun-Hajji in an effort to ensure that both would be defeated. Ali-Hajji of Akusha also led an anti-Denikin movement of his own, eventually succeeding in expelling the Whites from the North Caucasus. Uzun-Haji died in combat in March 1920, and Najmuddin left the North Caucasus for Georgia after the Red Army conquered the region.

=== Uprising in Dagestan (1920–1921) ===
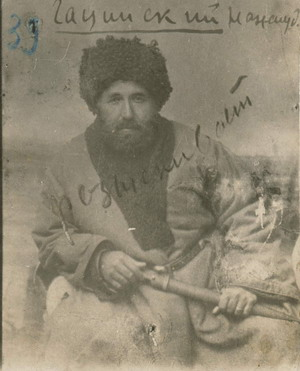
Najmuddin in 1920

An uprising against communist rule in Dagestan began on 11 May 1920, with a group of North Caucasian political figures gathering in the village of Vedeno and declaring the restoration of the monarchy of Imam Shamil. Muhammad Karim, Shamil's son, was first selected as monarch, but he refused on account of his health, instead sending his 19 year-old son Said. Najmuddin returned to Dagestan ahead of Said, leading an uprising in the Avar District in September 1920. The uprising soon spread across Dagestan, growing to include the Andi and Gunib districts. Both Gunib and Khunzakh, strategically-important villages held by the Bolsheviks, were also captured. At the Battle of Arakani Gorge, the rebels were able to inflict massive casualties on the Red Army.

Said arrived in Dagestan on 29 October 1920, and, in spite of his protestations that he was too young to be a monarch, he was crowned in a ceremony overseen by Najmuddin in the village of Gidatli. Contemporary analyses argued that the uprising amounted to a civil war in Dagestan. Residents of smaller villages were quick to join Najmuddin's forces, while those in larger settlements were subject to a massive propaganda campaign. In one instance, leading Bolshevik revolutionary Joseph Stalin proclaimed, "...If you drive out Gotsinsky, the enemy of the workers of Dagestan, then you will thereby justify the trust that the highest Soviet powers have placed in granting autonomy to Dagestan." The uprising was eventually defeated in May 1921, largely as a result of poor discipline among rebel ranks. Said fled to the mountains after being injured, while Najmuddin left for Chechnya, where he was in contact with British intelligence.

== Najmuddin as a fugitive ==
From 1921 until his eventual arrest, Najmuddin travelled across Chechnya and the Khasavyurt District, seeking support to launch another uprising. During his travels, he was provided with supplies and information by locals. He was additionally recognised by the North Caucasian diaspora; Ahmed-Khan Avarsky, an émigré in Istanbul who was viewed as a potential leader for an uprising, addressed the League of Nations with a request to acknowledge him as the future head of state of the North Caucasus, which was accepted. Najmuddin also maintained contact with fellow rebel leaders during this time, such as Ali Mitayev, who was preparing an uprising. According to plans jointly developed by Najmuddin and Mitayev, Shatoy and Vedeno would be the first locations to join the uprising, alongside Andi and Khasavyurt. The uprising would then spread throughout the remainder of Chechnya, which was to have a force of 15,000 insurgents.

The Soviet security forces quickly began attempting to stop Najmuddin and Mitayev from organising their uprising, arresting members of several underground anti-communist cells throughout Dagestan. In the village of Kakhib, a Congress of Highlander Tribes of Dagestan was organised by the Soviet government. The congress, which comprised 74 sheikhs, qadi, and teachers of Arabic, accused Najmuddin of being "an enemy of Muslims not only in Dagestan, but in the whole world, deserving the most severe punishment". This, along with other measures taken by security forces, pushed him to give up his plans for an uprising. In 1923, he contacted the head of the local branch of the Joint State Political Directorate via a relative, expressing his desire to end the conflict.

Najmuddin soon changed his mind once again, however, after a February 1924 visit by two British agents, who assured him of their country's support for his struggle. He delivered a note to the Soviet government, in which he demanded that they withdraw from all territory south of Rostov-on-Don. On 12 May 1924, the Soviets moved a military presence to Dylym and other nearby villages, taking prisoners and hostages. 370 people were killed, and Mitayev was arrested.On 19 May Najmuddin again proposed a meeting, but this time, he was outright refused by the Soviets. In September, he began receiving weapons and textiles from the British government. The British wanted Najmuddin to seize the villages of Botlikh, Vedeno, and Shatoy, believing that it would cause an uprising.

The Soviets launched a military operation in Chechnya the same year, beginning an uprising. Simultaneously, both the Red Army and Soviet security forces were closing in on Najmuddin. Orders were handed down demanding that he be taken alive.

=== Capture and execution ===
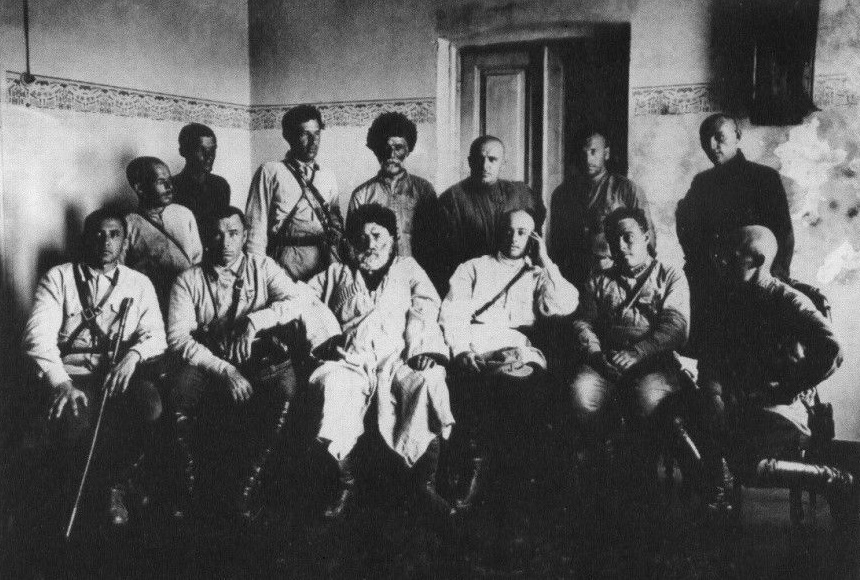
Najmuddin following his capture

Soviet security services undertook significant efforts to capture Najmuddin, who was hiding in the highlands of Dagestan. Prior to his capture, Najmuddin had personally captured and killed around twenty would-be assassins, and multiple attempted pushes by the Red Army had failed due to both unfavourable weather conditions and stiff resistance by rebels. The Red Army dispatched a cavalry detachment to Zumsoy in February 1924, expecting to find Najmuddin, but were instead encircled by rebels. Najmuddin allowed the cavalry detachment to escape unharmed, as he feared that a battle would cause civilian casualties.

He briefly resided in Salatavia from April 1924 until he was forced to retreat to the Vedeno District by the Red Army advance. In June of that year he fell ill, and he disbanded his military detachment, instead travelling from village to village. A decisive Red Army offensive in August 1925, during which 20,000 soldiers were deployed, led to Najmuddin evacuating to the forest. As his illness prevented him from staying outside for several days at a time, he instead began searching for a hamlet where he could remain. On 30 August, a battle took place outside the hamlet of Veduchi. As a result, Najmuddin's insurgents were forced to retreat to a nearby gorge, where they were routed within four days.

Najmuddin was arrested on 5 September. Local residents were given monetary rewards to reveal information about his whereabouts, and a local politician was sent to the hamlet of Chay to request his surrender. Najmuddin agreed on the condition that 16 Chechens associated with him were released, which the Soviet government allowed. He washed himself, prayed, and said to those who had revealed him, "I will speak to you on al-Qiyamah". During interrogation, Najmuddin was defiant, saying that those interrogating him would soon "fall victim" to their own ideology.

On 15 October 1925, Najmuddin was sentenced to execution by shooting in Rostov-on-Don. He was executed later that month.
