= Lakhchayda =

Lakhchayda Лахчайда Лахчайида
- Selo
- Location within Republic of Dagestan Location within Russia
- Coordinates: 42°24′N 46°50′E
- Country: Russia
- Region: Republic of Dagestan
- District: Gunibsky District
- Time zone: UTC+3:00

Lakhchayda (Russian: Лахчайда; Avar: Лахчайида) is a rural locality (a selo) in Tlogobsky Selsoviet, Gunibsky District, Republic of Dagestan, Russia. The population was 44 as of 2010.

== Geography ==
Lakhchayda is located 43 km northwest of Gunib (the district's administrative centre) by road, on the Kudiyabor River. Agada and Egeda are the nearest rural localities.

== Nationalities ==
Avars live there.
