= Balanub =

Balanub Балануб
- Selo
- Location within Republic of Dagestan Location within Russia
- Coordinates: 42°25′N 46°48′E
- Country: Russia
- Region: Republic of Dagestan
- District: Gunibsky District
- Time zone: UTC+3:00

Balanub (Russian: Балануб) is a rural locality (a selo) in Tlogobsky Selsoviet, Gunibsky District, Republic of Dagestan, Russia. The population was 117 as of 2010. There are 2 streets.

== Geography ==
Balanub is located 45 km northwest of Gunib (the district's administrative centre) by road, on the Kunada River. Kuker and Garbilazda are the nearest rural localities.
