= Unkida =

Unkida Ункида ГӀункӀкӀида
- Selo
- Location within Republic of Dagestan Location within Russia
- Coordinates: 42°19′N 46°53′E
- Country: Russia
- Region: Republic of Dagestan
- District: Gunibsky District
- Time zone: UTC+3:00

Unkida (Russian: Ункида; Avar: ГӀункӀкӀида) is a rural locality (a selo) in Rugudzhinsky Selsoviet, Gunibsky District, Republic of Dagestan, Russia. The population was 432 as of 2010.

== Geography ==
Unkida is located 20 km southwest of Gunib (the district's administrative centre) by road, on the Betsor River. Kulla and Batsada are the nearest rural localities.
