= Battle of Vedeno (1859) =

1859 military conflict in Chechnya

- Part of the Murid War
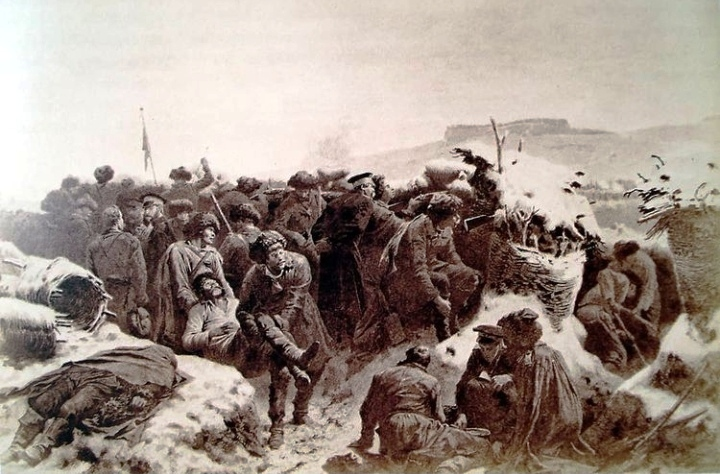
- The siege of the village of Vedenya, by Theodor Horschelt 1859
| Date | 1859 |
| Location | Vedeno, Chechnya, Caucasian Imamate |
| Result | Russian victory |

Belligerents
| Russian Empire | Caucasian Imamate |

Commanders and leaders
| (Russian Empire) Aleksandr Baryatinsky | Imam Shamil |

Strength
| 15,000; 20 cannons | 2,500–3,000 |

Casualties and losses
| 111–2,000 killed or wounded | 1,500 killed or wounded |

The Battle of Vedeno was a significant military engagement in 1859 during the Caucasian War between the Russian Empire and the Caucasian Imamate. It took place near Vedeno, a mountain village in Chechnya, which served as one of the last strongholds of Imam Shamil, the leader of the Caucasian resistance. The Russian forces, under the command of General Alexander Baryatinsky, aimed to defeat Shamil and consolidate control over the region. The fall of Vedeno marked the effective end of Shamil's resistance in the Eastern Caucasus, leading to his eventual capture in the same year.

== Background ==
The Caucasian War was a protracted conflict in which the Russian Empire sought to expand its territory into the Caucasus region. The North Caucasian highlanders, particularly the Chechen and Dagestani tribes, resisted this expansion fiercely. Imam Shamil, a prominent military and spiritual leader, united the highlanders under his leadership, organizing a series of effective guerrilla campaigns against Russian forces. By the late 1850s, Shamil's influence was primarily concentrated in Chechnya and Dagestan. The mountainous terrain and fortified villages like Vedeno allowed Shamil's forces to resist Russian advances for many years.

Vedeno, located in a remote mountain valley, was not only strategically significant but also symbolized Shamil's authority and leadership. Russian commanders believed that capturing Vedeno and eliminating Shamil's power base was essential to finally subduing the Eastern Caucasus.

== Prelude to the Battle ==
In 1859, Russian forces under General Alexander Baryatinsky, who was appointed commander-in-chief of the Caucasian front, launched a concerted campaign to neutralize Shamil's remaining forces. Baryatinsky employed a systematic approach, combining scorched-earth tactics, cutting off supply routes, and slowly advancing into Shamil's territory. Following several successful campaigns in Dagestan, Baryatinsky directed his forces toward Vedeno, where Shamil had retreated with his loyal followers.

== Russian Strategy and Tactics ==
The Russians’ approach involved surrounding Vedeno and placing it under siege. Russian artillery bombarded the village, while infantry and Cossack cavalry units blocked escape routes, effectively isolating Shamil's forces. The harsh conditions and lack of resources weakened Shamil's position, as food and ammunition supplies dwindled under the continuous Russian assault.

== Course of the Battle ==
The Russian forces initiated the assault with intense artillery bombardment, targeting Vedeno's defensive positions. Shamil's forces, however, were experienced in mountainous warfare and resisted fiercely, utilizing guerrilla tactics and launching counter-attacks from the natural defenses of the mountains.

Despite these efforts, the siege took a toll on Shamil's forces, who were outnumbered and increasingly isolated. Russian artillery and infantry assaults gradually weakened Vedeno's defenses. After several weeks of fighting, Russian forces breached the outer defenses of Vedeno. The Chechen and Dagestani defenders, exhausted and lacking sufficient supplies, could no longer withstand the Russian offensive.

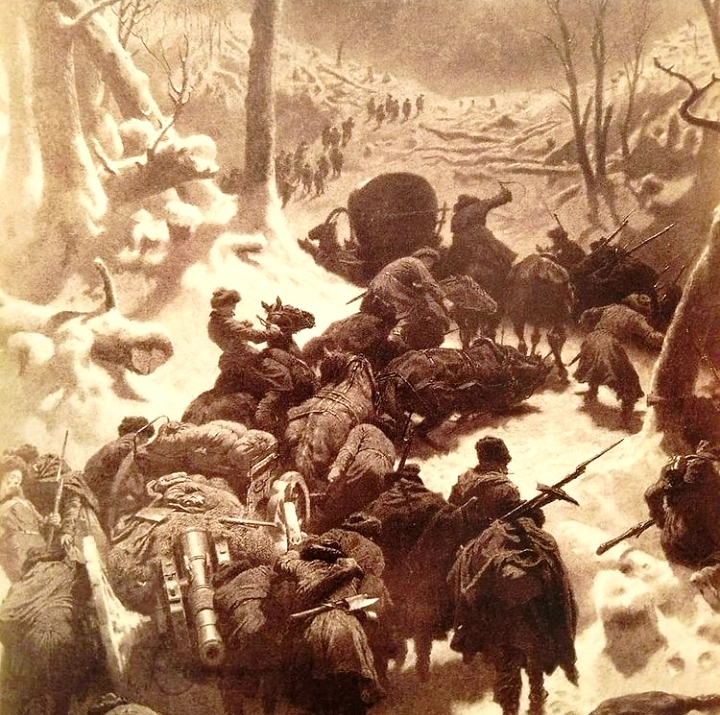
Expedition to the Vedeno, by Theodor Horschelt 1859

== Aftermath ==
The fall of Vedeno was a major blow to the North Caucasian resistance. With Shamil's capture, Russian control over the Eastern Caucasus was effectively consolidated. This allowed the Russian Empire to redirect its efforts toward subduing the remaining Circassian resistance in the Western Caucasus, which would continue until 1864.
