= Koroda =

Koroda Корода Къорода
- Selo
- Location within Republic of Dagestan Location within Russia
- Coordinates: 42°26′N 46°50′E
- Country: Russia
- Region: Republic of Dagestan
- District: Gunibsky District
- Time zone: UTC+3:00

Koroda (Russian: Корода; Avar: Къорода) is a rural locality (a selo) and the administrative centre of Korodinsky Selsoviet, Gunibsky District, Republic of Dagestan, Russia. The population was 939 as of 2010. There are 2 streets.

== Geography ==
Koroda is located 35 km northwest of Gunib (the district's administrative centre) by road, on the Kunada River. Karadakh and Uzdalroso are the nearest rural localities.
