= Khamagib =

Khamagib Хамагиб Хамагъиб
- Selo
- Location within Republic of Dagestan Location within Russia
- Coordinates: 42°24′N 46°51′E
- Country: Russia
- Region: Republic of Dagestan
- District: Gunibsky District
- Time zone: UTC+3:00

Khamagib (Russian: Хамагиб; Avar: Хамагъиб) is a rural locality (a selo) in Tlogobsky Selsoviet, Gunibsky District, Republic of Dagestan, Russia. The population was 72 as of 2010.

== Geography ==
Khamagib is located 45 km northwest of Gunib (the district's administrative centre) by road, on the Kudiyabor River. Enseruda and Amuarib are the nearest rural localities.

== Nationalities ==
Avars live there.
