= Khopor =

Khopor Хопор Хьопор
- Selo
- Location within Republic of Dagestan Location within Russia
- Coordinates: 42°21′N 46°56′E
- Country: Russia
- Region: Republic of Dagestan
- District: Gunibsky District
- Time zone: UTC+3:00

Khopor (Russian: Хопор; Avar: Хьопор) is a rural locality (a selo) in Rugudzhinsky Selsoviet, Gunibsky District, Republic of Dagestan, Russia. The population was 44 as of 2010.

== Geography ==
Khopor is located 14 km southwest of Gunib (the district's administrative centre) by road, on the Shabil-Alitl River. Khutni and Rugudzha are the nearest rural localities.
