= Bolshoy Urala =

Bolshoy Urala Большой Урала
- Selo
- Location within Republic of Dagestan Location within Russia
- Coordinates: 42°25′N 46°48′E
- Country: Russia
- Region: Republic of Dagestan
- District: Gunibsky District
- Time zone: UTC+3:00

Bolshoy Urala (Russian: Большой Урала) is a rural locality (a selo) in Tlogobsky Selsoviet, Gunibsky District, Republic of Dagestan, Russia. The population was 170 as of 2010.

== Geography ==
Bolshoy Urala is located 44 km northwest of Gunib (the district's administrative centre) by road, on the Kunada River. Urala and Maly Urala are the nearest rural localities.
