= Karadakh, Republic of Dagestan =

Karadakh Карадах Къарадахъ
- Selo
- Location within Republic of Dagestan Location within Russia
- Coordinates: 42°28′N 46°51′E
- Country: Russia
- Region: Republic of Dagestan
- District: Gunibsky District
- Time zone: UTC+3:00

Karadakh (Russian: Карадах; Avar: Къарадахъ) is a rural locality (a selo) in Korodinsky Selsoviet, Gunibsky District, Republic of Dagestan, Russia. The population was 390 as of 2010.

== Geography ==
Karadakh is located 32 km northwest of Gunib (the district's administrative centre) by road, on the Avarksoye Koysu River. Uzdalroso and Koroda are the nearest rural localities.
