= Batsada =

Batsada Бацада БацӀада
- Selo
- Location within Republic of Dagestan Location within Russia
- Coordinates: 42°18′N 46°54′E
- Country: Russia
- Region: Republic of Dagestan
- District: Gunibsky District
- Time zone: UTC+3:00

Batsada (Russian: Бацада; Avar: БацӀада) is a rural locality (a selo) and the administrative centre of Batsadinsky Selsoviet, Gunibsky District, Republic of Dagestan, Russia. The population was 754 as of 2010. There are 2 streets.

== Geography ==
Batsada is located 23 km southwest of Gunib (the district's administrative centre) by road. Kulla and Shulani are the nearest rural localities.
