= Khatsunob =

Khatsunob Хацуноб ХӀаццуноб
- Selo
- Location within Republic of Dagestan Location within Russia
- Coordinates: 42°25′N 46°48′E
- Country: Russia
- Region: Republic of Dagestan
- District: Gunibsky District
- Time zone: UTC+3:00

Khatsunob (Russian: Хацуноб; Avar: ХӀаццуноб) is a rural locality (a selo) in Tlogobsky Selsoviet, Gunibsky District, Republic of Dagestan, Russia. The population was 62 as of 2010.

== Geography ==
Khatsunob is located 44 km northwest of Gunib (the district's administrative centre) by road, on the Kunada River. Khenda and Bolshoy Urala are the nearest rural localities.

== Nationalities ==
Avars live there.
