= Ala, Republic of Dagestan =

Ala Ала ГӀвала
- Selo
- Location within Republic of Dagestan Location within Russia
- Coordinates: 42°24′N 46°50′E
- Country: Russia
- Region: Republic of Dagestan
- District: Gunibsky District
- Time zone: UTC+3:00

Ala (Russian: Ала; Avar: ГӀвала) is a rural locality (a selo) in Tlogobsky Selsoviet, Gunibsky District, Republic of Dagestan, Russia. The population was 140 as of 2010.

== Geography ==
Ala is located 43 km northwest of Gunib (the district's administrative centre) by road, on the Kudiyabor River. Lakhchayda and Agada are the nearest rural localities.
