= Egeda =

Egeda Эгеда Эгъеда
- Selo
- Location within Republic of Dagestan Location within Russia
- Coordinates: 42°24′N 46°50′E
- Country: Russia
- Region: Republic of Dagestan
- District: Gunibsky District
- Time zone: UTC+3:00

Egeda (Russian: Эгеда; Avar: Эгъеда) is a rural locality (a selo) in Tlogobsky Selsoviet, Gunibsky District, Republic of Dagestan, Russia. The population was 60 as of 2010.

== Geography ==
Egeda is located 45 km northwest of Gunib (the district's administrative centre) by road, on the Kudiyabor River. Amuarib and Shagalazda are the nearest rural localities.

== Nationalities ==
Avars live there.
