= Kamakhal =

Rural locality in Russia

Kamakhal Камахал Кӏамахъал
- Selo
- Location within Republic of Dagestan Location within Russia
- Coordinates: 42°13′N 46°59′E
- Country: Russia
- Region: Republic of Dagestan
- District: Laksky District
- Time zone: UTC+3:00

Kamakhal (Russian: Камахал; Lak: Кӏамахъал) is a rural locality (or selo) and the administrative centre of Kamakhalsky Selsoviet, Laksky District, Republic of Dagestan, Russia.

In 2010, the population was 51. There are 4 streets.

== Geography ==
Kamakhal is located 18 km (11 mi) northwest of the district's administrative center Kumukh, on the Tsamtichay river. Bukhty and Palisma are the nearest rural localities.
