= Bukhty =

Bukhty Бухты Бухди
- Selo
- Location within Republic of Dagestan Location within Russia
- Coordinates: 42°14′N 46°59′E
- Country: Russia
- Region: Republic of Dagestan
- District: Gunibsky District
- Time zone: UTC+3:00

Bukhty (Russian: Бухты; Avar: Бухди) is a rural locality (a selo) in Gunibsky District, Republic of Dagestan, Russia. The population was 994 as of 2010.

== Geography ==
Bukhty is located 30 km south of Gunib (the district's administrative centre) by road. Shangoda and Shitli are the nearest rural localities.
