= Ibrahim Haji al-Cherkessi =

Islamic scholar

Qadi of Muhajir Circassians in Caucasian Imamate
- In office 1846–1859
- Preceded by: Unknown
- Succeeded by: Office abolished

Personal details
- Born: Abdzekhia, Circassia
- Died: 25 August 1859 Gunib, Caucasian Imamate

Military service
- Allegiance: Circassia; Caucasian Imamate
- Branch/service: Army
- Years of service: 1840–1859
- Battles/wars: Russo-Circassian War; Caucasian War; Battle of Ghunib †

Ibrahim Haji al-Cherkessi (Adyghe: Ибрэхьим Хьаджэ) was a Circassian Islamic scholar, a close companion of Imam Shamil, and a key figure in the resistance during the Caucasian War. Originally from Abadzekh (Western Circassia), he was known for his knowledge of Islamic law and his unwavering commitment to the Caucasian Imamate.

== Early life ==
Ibrahim Haji is from the Abadzekh tribe of Circassia, which was heavily affected by the Russian expansion into the Caucasus. He emigrated (became a muhajir) to Dagestan, joining Imam Shamil's resistance movement. By December 1846, he had been appointed as the kadiy (religious judge) for Circassian refugees in the Gekhi region of Chechnya, demonstrating his legal and theological expertise.

== Role in the Caucasian War ==
Ibrahim Haji al-Cherkessi was a steadfast supporter of Imam Shamil and actively participated in the resistance. He lived in the village of Dargho, one of the centers of Shamil's administration. Known for his asceticism and bravery, he advised Imam Shamil on strategic and spiritual matters, making him a trusted figure within the Imamate.

His commitment to the cause was evident during the siege of Gunib in 1859. Ibrahim was one of the few leaders who stayed by Imam Shamil's side until the very end. According to historical accounts, he was actively involved in discussions about surrender terms and reportedly suggested adding defiant words to letters sent to Russian commanders during negotiations.

== Death at Gunib ==
Ibrahim Haji al-Cherkessi was killed during the final assault on Gunib on 25 August 1859. His death marked the culmination of his life's devotion to defending the Islamic and cultural identity of the Caucasus against Russian conquest.

== Legacy ==
Despite limited historical records, Ibrahim Haji al-Cherkessi is remembered as a pious scholar, a fierce warrior, and a loyal companion of Imam Shamil. His role highlights the unity of various Caucasian ethnic groups under the Imamate and their collective struggle for independence. He is frequently mentioned in chronicles of the Caucasian War, including those by Muhammad al-Karahi and Abdurahman of Gazikumukh.
