= Dagestan Oblast =

Province of the Russian Empire from 1860 to 1917

Coordinates: 42.8167°N 47.1167°E

Dagestan Oblast Дагестанская область
- Oblast
- Coat of arms

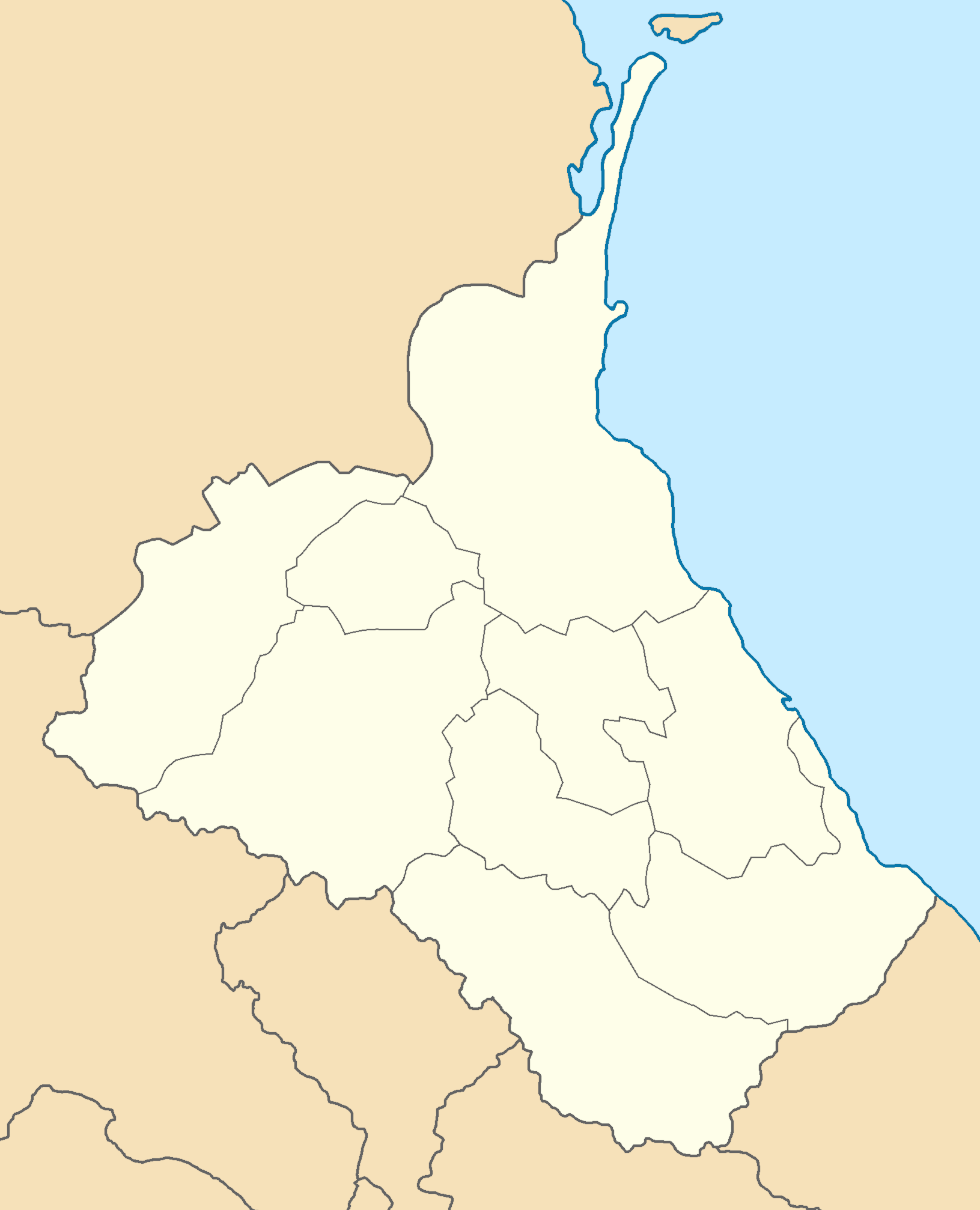
- Administrative map of the Dagestan Oblast
- Country: Russian Empire
- Viceroyalty: Caucasus
- Established: 1860
- Abolished: 1921
- Capital: Temir-Khan-Shura (present-day Buynaksk)

Area
  - Total: 29,709.63 km^{2} (11,470.95 sq mi)
- Highest elevation (Mount Bazardüzü): 4,466 m (14,652 ft)

Population (1916)
  - Total: 713,342
  - Density: 24.0105/km^{2} (62.1868/sq mi)
  - Urban: 9.81%
  - Rural: 90.19%

The Dagestan Oblast (Note: Russian: Дагестанская область, romanized: Dagestanskaya oblast) was a province (oblast) of the Caucasus Viceroyalty of the Russian Empire. It roughly corresponded to most of present-day southeastern Dagestan within the Russian Federation. The Dagestan oblast was created in 1860 out of the territories of the former Caucasian Imamate, bordering the Terek Oblast to the north, the Tiflis Governorate and Zakatal Okrug to the west, the Elizavetpol Governorate to the south, and Baku Governorate to the east. The administrative center of the oblast was Temir-Khan-Shura (present-day Buynaksk).

== Administrative divisions ==
The districts (okrugs) of the Dagestan oblast in 1917 were as follows:

Bold line denotes the largest city.

Name	Administrative centre and the largest city			Population		Area
Name		1897	1917	1897	1916	Area
Avarskiy okrug (Аварский округ)	Khunzakh	1,587	---	37,639	35,749	1,148.27 square versts (1,306.80 km^{2}; 504.56 mi^{2})
Andiyskiy okrug (Андийский округ)	Botlikh	1,225	---	49,628	57,875	3,152.17 square versts (3,587.37 km^{2}; 1,385.09 mi^{2})
Gunibskiy okrug (Гунибский округ)	Gunib	685	---	55,899	76,175	3,422.33 square versts (3,894.82 km^{2}; 1,503.80 mi^{2})
Darginskiy okrug (Даргинский округ)	Levashi	1,343	---	80,943	85,131	1,525.25 square versts (1,735.83 km^{2}; 670.21 mi^{2})
Kazikumukhskiy okrug (Казикумухский округ)	Kumukh	621	---	45,363	51,250	1,270.80 square versts (1,446.25 km^{2}; 558.40 mi^{2})
Kaytago-Tabasaranskiy okrug (Кайтаго-Табасаранский округ)	Madzhalis	1,327	---	91,021	82,154	2,896.54 square versts (3,296.44 km^{2}; 1,272.76 mi^{2})
Kaytago-Tabasaranskiy okrug (Кайтаго-Табасаранский округ)	Derbent	14,649	31,168	91,021	82,154	2,896.54 square versts (3,296.44 km^{2}; 1,272.76 mi^{2})
Kyurinskiy okrug (Кюринский округ)	Kasumkent	1,013	---	77,680	117,218	3,066.85 square versts (3,490.27 km^{2}; 1,347.60 mi^{2})
Samurskiy okrug (Самурский округ)	Akhty	3,190	---	35,633	71,556	3,258.87 square versts (3,708.80 km^{2}; 1,431.97 mi^{2})
Temir-Khan-Shurinskiy okrug (Темир-Хан-Шуринский округ)	Temir-Khan-Shura (Buynaksk)	9,214	15,239	97,348	136,234	5,464.01 square versts (6,218.38 km^{2}; 2,400.93 mi^{2})
Temir-Khan-Shurinskiy okrug (Темир-Хан-Шуринский округ)	Petrovsk (Makhachkala)	9,753	23,566	97,348	136,234	5,464.01 square versts (6,218.38 km^{2}; 2,400.93 mi^{2})

== Demographics ==
=== Russian Empire Census ===
According to the Russian Empire Census, the Dagestan oblast had a population of 571,154 on 28 January [O.S. 15 January] 1897, including 283,279 men and 287,875 women. The plurality of the population indicated Avar-Andean to be their mother tongue, with significant Dargin, Kyurin, Kazi-Kumukh, Kumyk, and Tatar (Note: Before 1918, Azerbaijanis were generally known as "Tatars". This term, employed by the Russians, referred to Turkic-speaking Muslims of the South Caucasus. After 1918, with the establishment of the Azerbaijan Democratic Republic and "especially during the Soviet era", the Tatar group identified itself as "Azerbaijani".) speaking minorities.

Linguistic composition of the Dagestan oblast in 1897
Language	Native speakers	%
Avar-Andean	158,550	27.76
Dargin	121,375	21.25
Kyurin	94,596	16.56
Kazi-Kumukh	76,381	13.37
Kumyk	51,209	8.97
Tatar	32,143	5.63
Russian	13,111	2.30
Jewish	7,361	1.29
Tat	2,998	0.52
Ukrainian	2,895	0.51
Nogai	1,909	0.33
Persian	1,720	0.30
Armenian	1,636	0.29
Polish	1,630	0.29
Arabic	912	0.16
Chechen	757	0.13
Lithuanian	520	0.09
Georgian	375	0.07
German	261	0.05
Belarusian	38	0.01
Other	777	0.14
TOTAL	571,154	100.00

Religious composition of the Dagestan oblast in 1897
Faith	Male	Female	Both	
Faith	Male	Female	Number	%
Muslim	263,475	276,815	540,290	94.60
Eastern Orthodox	10,996	5,341	16,337	2.86
Judaism	5,367	4,689	10,056	1.76
Roman Catholic	2,079	137	2,216	0.39
Armenian Apostolic	955	668	1,623	0.28
Old Believer	184	114	298	0.05
Lutheran	185	100	285	0.05
Armenian Catholic	24	5	29	0.01
Baptist	1	1	2	0.00
Anglican	0	3	3	0.00
Buddhist	3	0	3	0.00
Reformed	3	0	3	0.00
Other non-Christian denomination	7	2	9	0.00
TOTAL	283,279	287,875	571,154	100.00

Linguistic composition of uezds in the Dagestan Oblast in 1897

Okrug	Avar-Andean		Dargin		Kyurin		Kazi-Kumukh		Kumyk		Tatar		TOTAL
Okrug	Number	%	Number	%	Number	%	Number	%	Number	%	Number	%	TOTAL
Temir-Khan-Shura	15,194	15.61	9,724	9.99	15	0.02	588	0.60	49,730	51.08	1,261	1.30	97,348
Avar	36,063	95.81	18	0.05	4	0.01	13	0.03	4	0.01	5	0.01	37,639
Andi	48,637	98.00	9	0.02	1	0.00	27	0.05	24	0.05	15	0.03	49,628
Gunib	52,227	93.43	774	1.38	0	0.00	2,113	3.78	17	0.03	35	0.06	55,899
Dargin	3,131	3.87	73,899	91.3	9	0.01	3,739	4.62	0	0.00	8	0.01	80,943
Kazikumukh	2,446	5.39	3,657	8.06	943	2.08	38,014	83.8	47	0.10	145	0.32	45,363
Kaitago-Tabasaran	628	0.69	33,186	36.46	350	0.38	17,678	19.42	1,035	1.14	28,975	31.83	91,021
Kyurin	50	0.06	45	0.06	59,309	76.35	13,694	17.63	5	0.01	1,321	1.70	77680
Samur	174	0.49	63	0.18	33,965	95.32	515	1.45	346	0.97	379	1.06	35633
TOTAL	158,550	27.76	121,375	21.25	94,596	16.56	76,381	13.37	51,209	8.97	32,143	5.63	571,154

=== Kavkazskiy kalendar ===
According to the 1917 publication of Kavkazskiy kalendar, the Dagestan oblast had a population of 713,342 on 14 January [O.S. 1 January] 1916, including 369,737 men and 343,605 women, 659,976 of whom were the permanent population, and 53,366 were temporary residents:

Nationality	Urban		Rural		TOTAL	
Nationality	Number	%	Number	%	Number	%
North Caucasians	12,247	17.50	533,367	82.90	545,614	76.49
Sunni Muslims (Note: Primarily Turco-Tatars.)	1,137	1.62	90,840	14.12	91,977	12.89
Russians	27,045	38.65	9,078	1.41	36,123	5.06
Jews	11,913	17.03	5,397	0.84	17,310	2.43
Shia Muslims (Note: Primarily Tatars.)	11,263	16.10	4,352	0.68	15,615	2.19
Armenians	4,668	6.67	84	0.01	4,752	0.67
Other Europeans	736	1.05	251	0.04	987	0.14
Asiatic Christians	785	1.12	0	0.00	785	0.11
Georgians	179	0.26	0	0.00	179	0.03
TOTAL	69,973	100.00	643,369	100.00	713,342	100.00

== Bibliography ==
- Bournoutian, George A. (2018). Armenia and Imperial Decline: The Yerevan Province, 1900–1914. Milton Park, Abingdon, Oxon: Routledge. ISBN 978-1-351-06260-2. OCLC 1037283914.
- Hovannisian, Richard G. (1971). The Republic of Armenia. Vol. 1: The First Year, 1918–1919. Berkeley: University of California Press. ISBN 978-0520019843.
- Кавказский календарь на 1913 год [Caucasian calendar for 1913] (in Russian) (68th ed.). Tiflis: Tipografiya kantselyarii Ye.I.V. na Kavkaze, kazenny dom. 1913. Archived from the original on 19 April 2022.
- Кавказский календарь на 1917 год [Caucasian calendar for 1917] (in Russian) (72nd ed.). Tiflis: Tipografiya kantselyarii Ye.I.V. na Kavkaze, kazenny dom. 1917. Archived from the original on 4 November 2021.
- Tsutsiev, Arthur (2014). Atlas of the Ethno-Political History of the Caucasus (PDF). Translated by Nora Seligman Favorov. New Haven: Yale University Press. ISBN 9780300153088. Archived (PDF) from the original on 17 June 2023.
