= Battle of Ghunib =

1859 siege of aul Gunib by Russian forces

Coordinates: 42.3881°N 46.9622°E

Siege of Ghunib
- Part of the Murid War
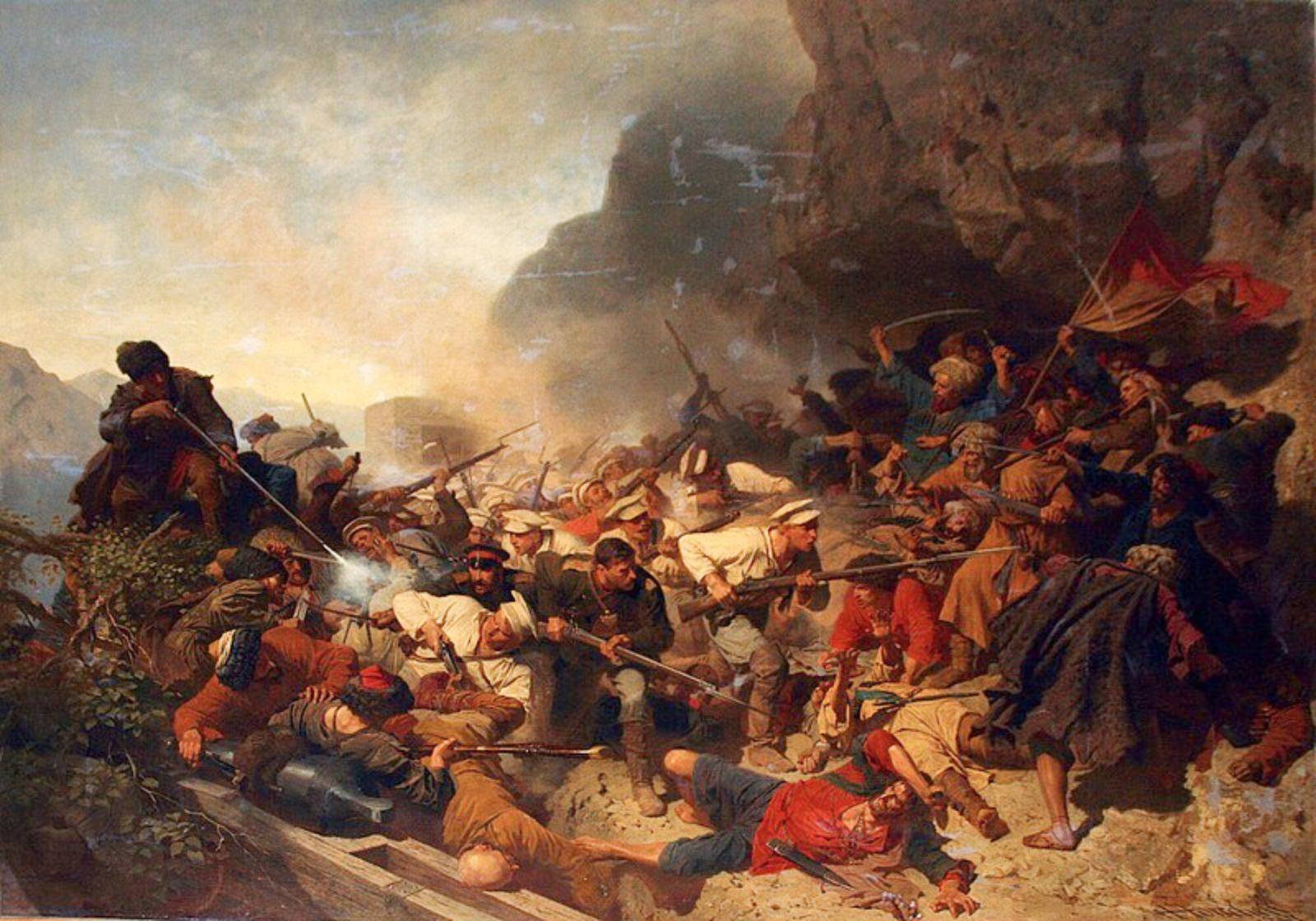
- Assault on the fortifications of Gunib. Painting by T. Gorschelt. 1867
Date	9–25 August 1859
Location	Ghunib, Daghestan, Caucasian Imamate
Result	Russian victory; Effective end of the War; Capture of Imam Shamil

Belligerents
Russian Empire	Caucasian Imamate

Commanders and leaders
Aleksandr Baryatinsky	Imam Shamil (surrendered); Ibrahim Haji al-Cherkessi †

Strength
16,000; 18 guns	400; 4 cannons

Casualties and losses
	about 350-360 killed and wounded, 40-50 prisoners

The Siege and Storming of Ghunib was a decisive encounter at the mountain stronghold of Ghunib, conducted by Russian forces in August 1859. After 25 years of leading fierce resistance against Russian expansion, Imam Shamil, the leader of the Caucasian Imamate, was captured and forced to surrender, marking the effective end of the Murid War.

== Background ==
The Battle of Ghunib was the final engagement of the Caucasian War, marking the end of Imam Shamil's resistance against Russian imperial expansion. Shamil, leader of the North Caucasus resistance and third Imam of the Caucasian Imamate, had conducted a prolonged guerrilla war to defend Dagestan and Chechnya against Russian forces. The mountainous terrain of Ghunib served as his last stronghold.

== The Battle ==
The Russian forces, led by Prince Aleksandr Baryatinsky, surrounded Ghunib Plateau in August 1859. Facing a numerically superior and well-equipped enemy, Shamil and his forces held their position for several days. Despite their determination, the defenders were overwhelmed after the Russians launched a coordinated assault. The fortress fell on August 25, 1859, and Shamil was captured.

== Aftermath ==
Shamil's capture marked the end of organized resistance in the North Caucasus, leading to the eventual consolidation of Russian rule in the region. Shamil was taken to St. Petersburg, where he met Tsar Alexander II, before being exiled to Kaluga. The battle is considered a pivotal event in the Russian conquest of the Caucasus.

== Legacy ==
The Battle of Ghunib is remembered as a symbol of resilience and resistance in the North Caucasus. Shamil's leadership and the struggle against imperial forces have made him a national hero in Dagestan and Chechnya. The site of the battle has become a historical landmark.

== Sources ==
- Mukhanov, V. M. (2008). "ГУНИ́БА ШТУРМ 1859" [Gunib storming 1859]. In Kravets, S. L.; et al. (eds.). Great Russian Encyclopedia (in Russian). Vol. 8: Grigoryev - Dinamika. Moscow: Great Russian Encyclopedia. ISBN 978-5-85270-338-5.
- The Russian conquest of the Caucasus, John Frederick Baddeley, 1908
