= Kazikumukhskiy okrug =

Coordinates: 42°10′14″N 47°07′03″E

Kazikumukhskiy okrug Казикумухский округ
- Okrug
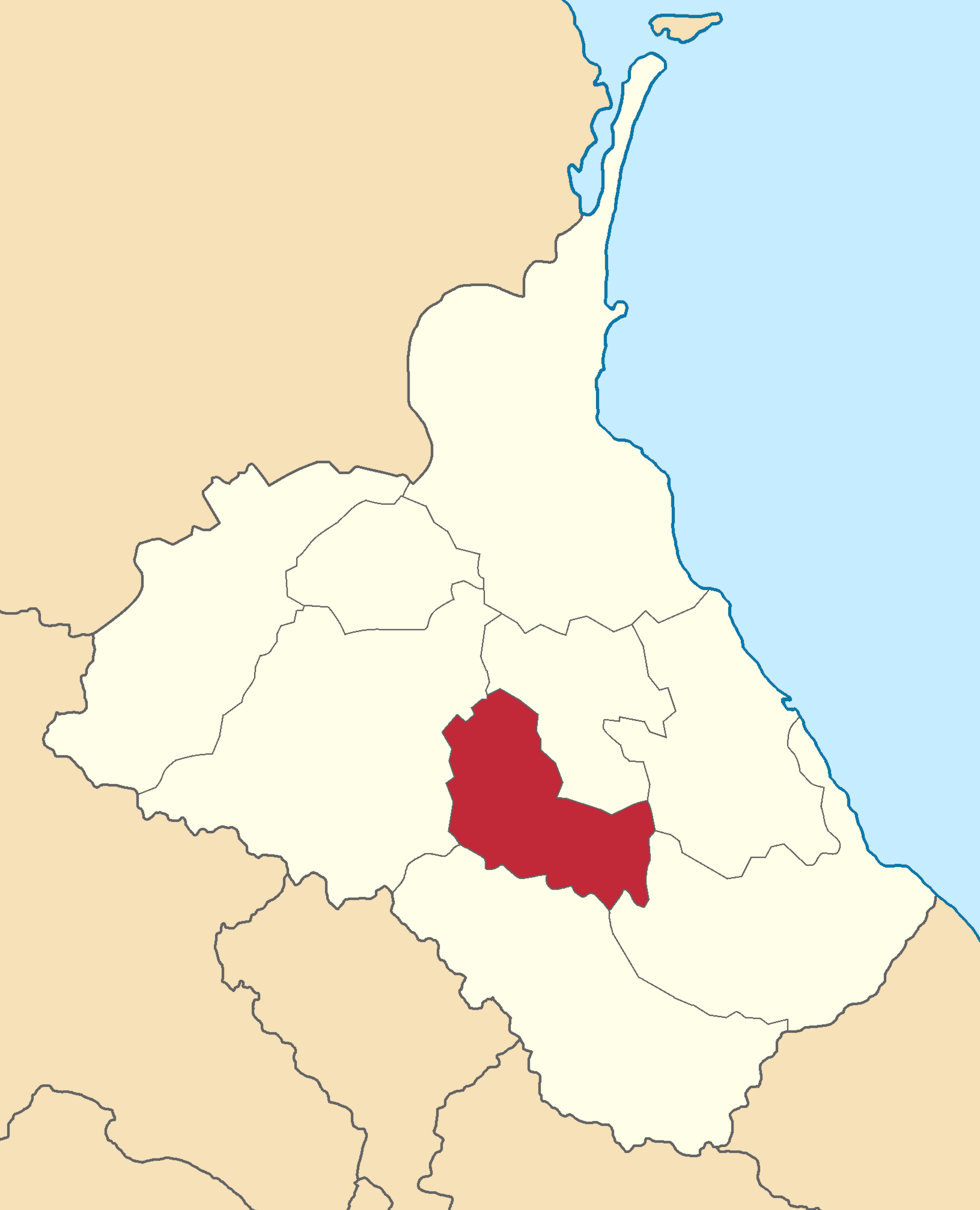
- Location in the Dagestan Oblast
- Country: Russian Empire
- Viceroyalty: Caucasus
- Oblast: Dagestan
- Established: 1860
- Abolished: 1922
- Capital: Kumukh

Area
  - Total: 1,446.25 km^{2} (558.40 sq mi)

Population (1916)
  - Total: 51,250
  - Density: 35.44/km^{2} (91.78/sq mi)
  - Rural: 100.00%

The Kazikumukhskiy okrug (Note: Russian: Казикумухский округ, pre-reform orthography: Казикумухскій округъ [kəzʲɪkʊmʊxskʲɪj ɐkrʊk]) was a district (okrug) of the Dagestan Oblast of the Caucasus Viceroyalty of the Russian Empire. The area of the Kazikumukhskiy okrug is included in contemporary Dagestan of the Russian Federation. The district's administrative centre was Kumukh.

== Administrative divisions ==
The prefectures (участки, uchastki) of the Kazikumukhskiy okrug in 1917 were:

| Name | 1912 population | Area |
|---|---|---|
| Vitskhinskiy prefecture (Вицхинский участок) | 21,639 | 335.29 square versts (381.58 km^{2}; 147.33 mi^{2}) |
| Kazikumukhskiy prefecture (Казикумухский участок) | 28,712 | 935.51 square versts (1,064.67 km^{2}; 411.07 mi^{2}) |

== Demographics ==
=== Russian Empire Census ===
According to the Russian Empire Census, the Kazikumukhskiy okrug had a population of 45,363 on 28 January [O.S. 15 January] 1897, including 18,122 men and 27,241 women. The majority of the population indicated Kazi-Kumukh to be their mother tongue, with significant Dargin and Avar speaking minorities.

Linguistic composition of the Kazikumukhskiy okrug in 1897
| Language | Native speakers | % |
|---|---|---|
| Kazi-Kumukh | 38,014 | 83.80 |
| Dargin | 3,657 | 8.06 |
| Avar-Andean | 2,446 | 5.39 |
| Kyurin | 943 | 2.08 |
| Tatar (Note: Before 1918, Azerbaijanis were generally known as "Tatars". This term, employed by the Russians, referred to Turkic-speaking Muslims of the South Caucasus. After 1918, with the establishment of the Azerbaijan Democratic Republic and "especially during the Soviet era", the Tatar group identified itself as "Azerbaijani".) | 145 | 0.32 |
| Kumyk | 47 | 0.10 |
| Russian | 27 | 0.06 |
| Georgian | 24 | 0.05 |
| Jewish | 12 | 0.03 |
| Armenian | 7 | 0.02 |
| German | 1 | 0.00 |
| Polish | 1 | 0.00 |
| Ukrainian | 1 | 0.00 |
| Other | 38 | 0.08 |
| TOTAL | 45,363 | 100.00 |

=== Kavkazskiy kalendar ===
According to the 1917 publication of Kavkazskiy kalendar, the Kazikumukhskiy okrug had a population of 51,250 on 14 January [O.S. 1 January] 1916, including 25,385 men and 25,865 women, 51,092 of whom were the permanent population, and 158 were temporary residents:

| Nationality | Number | % |
|---|---|---|
| North Caucasians | 51,212 | 99.93 |
| Russians | 37 | 0.07 |
| Armenians | 1 | 0.00 |
| TOTAL | 51,250 | 100.00 |

== Bibliography ==
- Bournoutian, George A. (2018). Armenia and Imperial Decline: The Yerevan Province, 1900–1914. Milton Park, Abingdon, Oxon: Routledge. ISBN 978-1-351-06260-2. OCLC 1037283914.
- Hovannisian, Richard G. (1971). The Republic of Armenia. Vol. 1: The First Year, 1918–1919. Berkeley: University of California Press. ISBN 978-0520019843.
- Кавказский календарь на 1913 год [Caucasian calendar for 1913] (in Russian) (68th ed.). Tiflis: Tipografiya kantselyarii Ye.I.V. na Kavkaze, kazenny dom. 1913. Archived from the original on 19 April 2022.
- Кавказский календарь на 1917 год [Caucasian calendar for 1917] (in Russian) (72nd ed.). Tiflis: Tipografiya kantselyarii Ye.I.V. na Kavkaze, kazenny dom. 1917. Archived from the original on 4 November 2021.
- Tsutsiev, Arthur (2014). Atlas of the Ethno-Political History of the Caucasus (PDF). Translated by Nora Seligman Favorov. New Haven: Yale University Press. ISBN 9780300153088. Archived (PDF) from the original on 17 June 2023.
