= Makhachkala Urban Okrug =

- District
- Flag
- Coordinates: 43°00′00″N 47°25′00″E
- Country: Russia
- Federal subject: Mandatory parameter. Please, specify
- Established: 13 January 2005
- Administrative center: Makhachkala

Area
  - Total: 468.13 km^{2} (180.75 sq mi)
- Time zone: UTC+3 (MSK)
- OKTMO ID: 82701000

Makhachkala Urban Okrug is an urban okrug in the Republic of Dagestan, Russia. It was established on 13 January 2005. The administrative center is Makhachkala.
