= Gunibskiy okrug =

Coordinates: 42°23′12″N 46°57′42″E

Gunibskiy okrug Гунибский округ
- Okrug
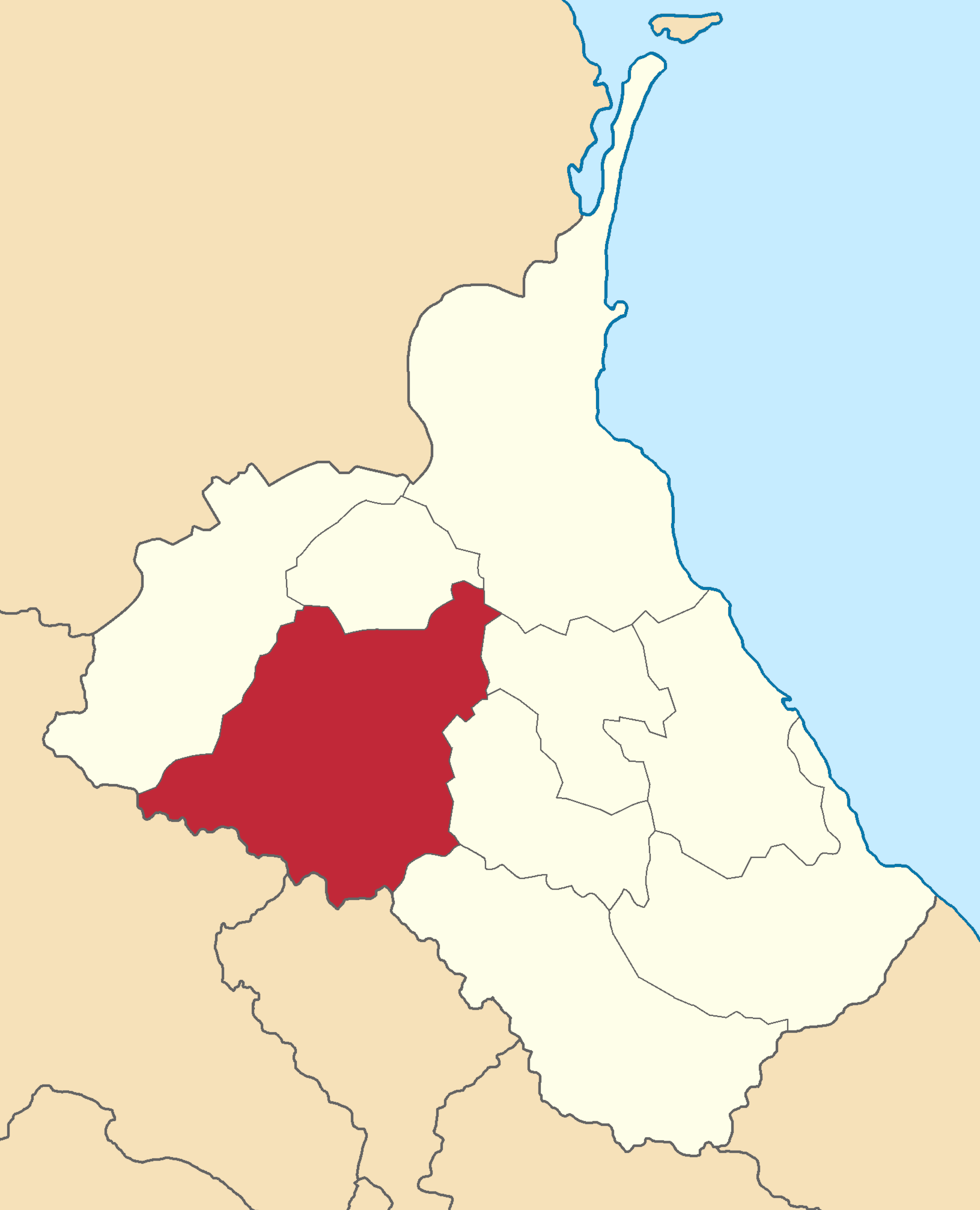
- Location in the Dagestan Oblast
- Country: Russian Empire
- Viceroyalty: Caucasus
- Oblast: Dagestan
- Established: 1860
- Abolished: 1928
- Capital: Gunib

Area
  - Total: 3,894.82 km^{2} (1,503.80 sq mi)

Population (1916)
  - Total: 76,175
  - Density: 19.558/km^{2} (50.655/sq mi)
  - Rural: 100.00%

The Gunibskiy okrug (Note: Russian: Гунибский округъ, pre-reform orthography: Гунибскій округъ [ɡʊnʲɪpskʲɪj ɐkrʊk]; Avar: Гъуниб сверухълъи, romanized: Ghunib sveruqli) was a district (okrug) of the Dagestan Oblast of the Caucasus Viceroyalty of the Russian Empire. The area of the Gunibskiy okrug is included in contemporary Dagestan of the Russian Federation. The district's centre was Gunib.

== Administrative divisions ==
The prefectures (участки, uchastki) of the Gunibskiy okrug in 1917 were:

Name	1912 population	Area
Andalyalskiy prefecture (Андаляльский участок)	14,623	312.69 square versts (355.86 km^{2}; 137.40 mi^{2})
Ants.-Kapuchinskiy prefecture (Анц.-Капучинский участок)	15,607	1,831.78 square versts (2,084.68 km^{2}; 804.90 mi^{2})
Kuyadinskiy prefecture (Куядинский участок)	10,076	256.95 square versts (292.43 km^{2}; 112.91 mi^{2})
Tilitl-Gidatlinskiy prefecture (Тилитлъ-Гидатлинский участок)	18,829	812.00 square versts (924.11 km^{2}; 356.80 mi^{2})
Tleyserukhskiy prefecture (Тлейсерухский участок)	14,443	1,108.91 square versts (1,262.01 km^{2}; 487.26 mi^{2})

== Demographics ==
=== Russian Empire Census ===
According to the Russian Empire Census, the Gunibskiy okrug had a population of 37,639 on 28 January [O.S. 15 January] 1897, including 18,890 men and 18,749 women. The majority of the population indicated Avar to be their mother tongue.

Linguistic composition of the Gunibskiy okrug in 1897
Language	Native speakers	%
Avar-Andean	52,227	93.43
Kazi-Kumukh	2,113	3.78
Dargin	774	1.38
Russian	376	0.67
Ukrainian	159	0.28
Polish	84	0.15
Tatar (Note: Before 1918, Azerbaijanis were generally known as "Tatars". This term, employed by the Russians, referred to Turkic-speaking Muslims of the South Caucasus. After 1918, with the establishment of the Azerbaijan Democratic Republic and "especially during the Soviet era", the Tatar group identified itself as "Azerbaijani".)	35	0.06
Jewish	33	0.06
Kumyk	17	0.03
Lithuanian	16	0.03
Armenian	10	0.02
German	8	0.01
Georgian	7	0.01
Belarusian	1	0.00
Other	39	0.07
TOTAL	55,899	100.00

=== Kavkazskiy kalendar ===
According to the 1917 publication of Kavkazskiy kalendar, the Gunibskiy okrug had a population of 76,175 on 14 January [O.S. 1 January] 1916, including 38,079 men and 38,096 women, 76,088 of whom were the permanent population, and 87 were temporary residents:

Nationality	Number	%
North Caucasians	76,088	99.89
Russians	75	0.10
Armenians	6	0.01
Other Europeans	6	0.01
TOTAL	76,175	100.00

== Bibliography ==
- Bournoutian, George A. (2018). Armenia and Imperial Decline: The Yerevan Province, 1900–1914. Milton Park, Abingdon, Oxon: Routledge. ISBN 978-1-351-06260-2. OCLC 1037283914.
- Hovannisian, Richard G. (1971). The Republic of Armenia. Vol. 1: The First Year, 1918–1919. Berkeley: University of California Press. ISBN 978-0520019843.
- Кавказский календарь на 1913 год [Caucasian calendar for 1913] (in Russian) (68th ed.). Tiflis: Tipografiya kantselyarii Ye.I.V. na Kavkaze, kazenny dom. 1913. Archived from the original on 19 April 2022.
- Кавказский календарь на 1917 год [Caucasian calendar for 1917] (in Russian) (72nd ed.). Tiflis: Tipografiya kantselyarii Ye.I.V. na Kavkaze, kazenny dom. 1917. Archived from the original on 4 November 2021.
- Tsutsiev, Arthur (2014). Atlas of the Ethno-Political History of the Caucasus (PDF). Translated by Nora Seligman Favorov. New Haven: Yale University Press. ISBN 9780300153088. Archived (PDF) from the original on 17 June 2023.
