= Gotsob =

Gotsob Гоцоб Хӏоцоб
- Selo
- Location within Republic of Dagestan Location within Russia
- Coordinates: 42°35′N 46°52′E
- Country: Russia
- Region: Republic of Dagestan
- District: Gergebilsky District
- Time zone: UTC+3:00

Gotsob (Russian: Гоцоб; Avar: Хӏоцоб) is a rural locality (a selo) in Gergebilsky District, Republic of Dagestan, Russia. The population was 164 as of 2010. There are 8 streets.

== Geography ==
Gotsob is located 31 km northwest of Gergebil (the district's administrative centre) by road. Orkachi and Novaya Butsra are the nearest rural localities.
