= Avarskiy okrug =

Coordinates: 42°32′42″N 46°42′25″E

Avarskiy okrug Аварский округ
- Okrug
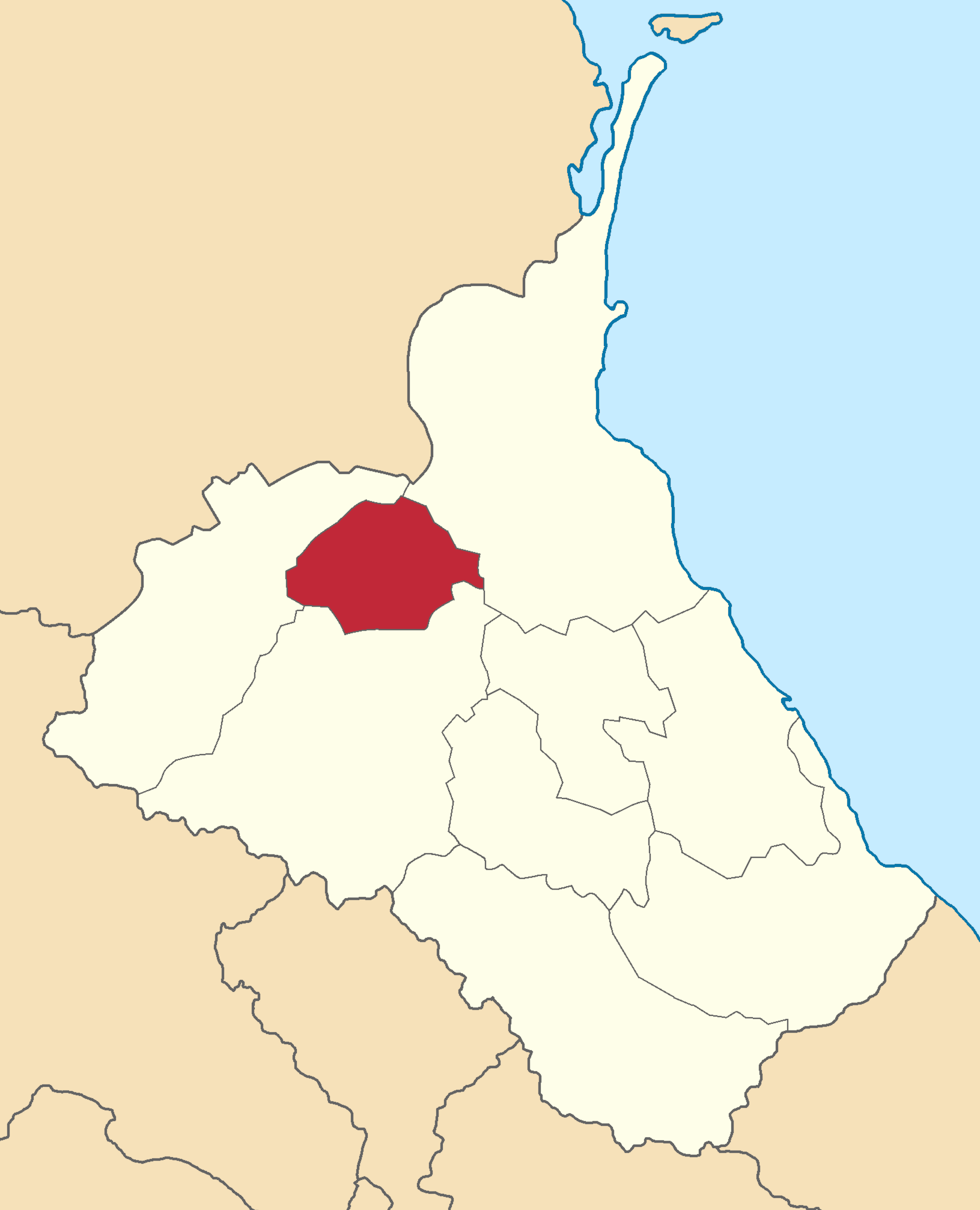
- Location in the Dagestan Oblast
- Country: Russian Empire
- Viceroyalty: Caucasus
- Oblast: Dagestan
- Established: 1864
- Abolished: 1928
- Capital: Khunzakh

Area
  - Total: 1,306.80 km^{2} (504.56 sq mi)

Population (1916)
  - Total: 35,749
  - Density: 27.356/km^{2} (70.852/sq mi)
  - Rural: 100.00%

The Avarskiy okrug (Note: Russian: Аварский округ, pre-reform orthography: Аварскій округъ [ɐvərskʲɪj ɐkrʊk]; Avar: Авар сверухълъи, romanized: Avar sveruqli) was a district (okrug) of the Dagestan Oblast of the Caucasus Viceroyalty of the Russian Empire. The area of the Avarskiy okrug is included in contemporary Dagestan of the Russian Federation. The district's administrative centre was Khunzakh.

== Administrative divisions ==
The prefectures (участки, uchastki) of the Avarskiy okrug in 1917 were:

Name	1912 population	Area
Khunzakhskiy prefecture (Хунзахский участок)	19,026	524.32 square versts (596.71 km^{2}; 230.39 mi^{2})
Koysubulinskiy prefecture (Койсубулинский участок)	13,687	623.95 square versts (710.09 km^{2}; 274.17 mi^{2})

== Demographics ==
=== Russian Empire Census ===
According to the Russian Empire Census, the Avarskiy okrug had a population of 37,639 on 28 January [O.S. 15 January] 1897, including 18,890 men and 18,749 women. The majority of the population indicated Avar to be their mother tongue.

Linguistic composition of the Avarskiy okrug in 1897
Language	Native speakers	%
Avar-Andean	36,063	95.81
Arabic	912	2.42
Russian	428	1.14
Ukrainian	83	0.22
Polish	26	0.07
Dargin	18	0.05
Kazi-Kumukh	13	0.03
Jewish	12	0.03
Georgian	11	0.03
German	7	0.02
Armenian	6	0.02
Kumyk	5	0.01
Kyurin	4	0.01
Tatar (Note: Before 1918, Azerbaijanis were generally known as "Tatars". This term, employed by the Russians, referred to Turkic-speaking Muslims of the South Caucasus. After 1918, with the establishment of the Azerbaijan Democratic Republic and "especially during the Soviet era", the Tatar group identified itself as "Azerbaijani".)	4	0.01
Chechen	1	0.00
Persian	1	0.00
Other	45	0.12
TOTAL	37,639	100.00

=== Kavkazskiy kalendar ===
According to the 1917 publication of Kavkazskiy kalendar, the Avarskiy okrug had a population of 35,749 on 14 January [O.S. 1 January] 1916, including 17,956 men and 17,793 women, 34,935 of whom were the permanent population, and 814 were temporary residents:

Nationality	Number	%
North Caucasians	34,957	97.78
Russians	666	1.86
Other Europeans	91	0.25
Jews	31	0.09
Armenians	4	0.01
TOTAL	35,749	100.00

== Bibliography ==
- Bournoutian, George A. (2018). Armenia and Imperial Decline: The Yerevan Province, 1900–1914. Milton Park, Abingdon, Oxon: Routledge. ISBN 978-1-351-06260-2. OCLC 1037283914.
- Hovannisian, Richard G. (1971). The Republic of Armenia. Vol. 1: The First Year, 1918–1919. Berkeley: University of California Press. ISBN 978-0520019843.
- Кавказский календарь на 1913 год [Caucasian calendar for 1913] (in Russian) (68th ed.). Tiflis: Tipografiya kantselyarii Ye.I.V. na Kavkaze, kazenny dom. 1913. Archived from the original on 19 April 2022.
- Кавказский календарь на 1917 год [Caucasian calendar for 1917] (in Russian) (72nd ed.). Tiflis: Tipografiya kantselyarii Ye.I.V. na Kavkaze, kazenny dom. 1917. Archived from the original on 4 November 2021.
- Tsutsiev, Arthur (2014). Atlas of the Ethno-Political History of the Caucasus (PDF). Translated by Nora Seligman Favorov. New Haven: Yale University Press. ISBN 9780300153088. Archived (PDF) from the original on 17 June 2023.
