= Khadzhalmakhi =

Khadzhalmakhi Хаджалмахи Хажалмахьи
- Selo
- Location within Republic of Dagestan Location within Russia
- Coordinates: 42°24′N 47°10′E
- Country: Russia
- Region: Republic of Dagestan
- District: Levashinsky District
- Time zone: UTC+3:00

Khadzhalmakhi (Russian: Хаджалмахи; Dargwa: Хажалмахьи, romanized: Xažalmaxi) is a rural locality (a selo) and the administrative centre of Khadzhalmakhinsky Selsoviet, Levashinsky District, Republic of Dagestan, Russia. The population was 6,187 as of 2010. There are 18 streets.

== Geography ==
Khadzhalmakhi is located 15 km southwest of Levashi (the district's administrative centre) by road. Tashkapur and Nizhny Ubekimakhi are the nearest rural localities.

== Nationalities ==
Dargins live there.
