= Kakhib =

Kakhib Кахиб
- Selo
- Location within Republic of Dagestan Location within Russia
- Coordinates: 42°24′N 46°10′E
- Country: Russia
- Region: Republic of Dagestan
- District: Shamilsky District
- Time zone: UTC+3:00

Kakhib (Russian: Кахиб) is a rural locality (a selo) in Shamilsky District, Republic of Dagestan, Russia. Population: 1,733 (2021 census); 1,197 (2002 census); 899 (1989 Soviet census). There are 5 streets in this selo.

== Geography ==
This rural locality is located 4 km from Khebda (the district's administrative centre), 95 km from Makhachkala (capital of Dagestan) and 1,655 km from Moscow. Goor is the nearest rural locality.
