= Andiyskiy okrug =

Coordinates: 42°40′02″N 46°12′54″E

Andiyskiy okrug Андийский округ
- Okrug
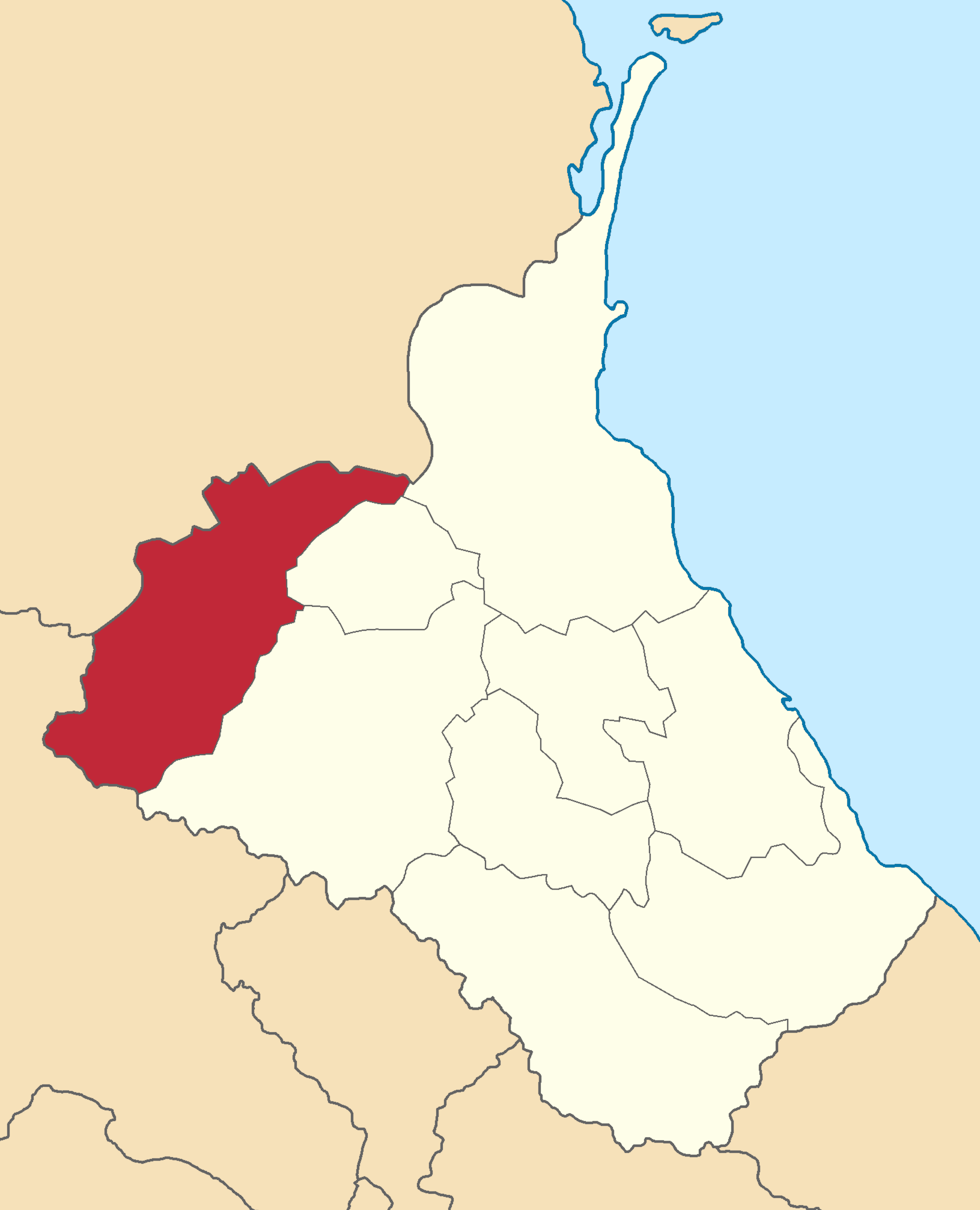
- Location in the Dagestan Oblast
- Country: Russian Empire
- Viceroyalty: Caucasus
- Oblast: Dagestan
- Established: 1861
- Abolished: 1928
- Capital: Botlikh

Area
  - Total: 3,587.37 km^{2} (1,385.09 sq mi)

Population (1916)
  - Total: 57,875
  - Density: 16.133/km^{2} (41.784/sq mi)
  - Rural: 100.00%

The Andiyskiy okrug (Note: Russian: Андийский округ, pre-reform orthography: Андійскій округъ [ɐnʲdʲɪjskʲɪj ɐkrʊk]; Avar: Гӏанди сверухълъи, romanized: Ghandi sveruqli) was a district (okrug) of the Dagestan Oblast of the Caucasus Viceroyalty of the Russian Empire. The area of the Andiyskiy okrug is included in contemporary Dagestan of the Russian Federation. The district's administrative centre was Botlikh.

== Administrative divisions ==
The prefectures (участки, uchastki) of the Andiyskiy okrug in 1917 were:

Name	1912 population	Area
Gumbetovskiy prefecture (Гумбетовский участок)	10,257	772.52 square versts (879.18 km^{2}; 339.45 mi^{2})
Rayon pomoshchn. ego. (Район помощн. его.)	6,630	–
Kar.-Tekhnutsalskiy prefecture (Кар.-Технуцальский участок)	13,209	1,135.79 square versts (1,292.60 km^{2}; 499.08 mi^{2})
Rayon pomoshchn. ego. (Район помощн. его.)	15,599	–
Unkr.-Didoyevskiy prefecture (Ункр.-Дидоевский участок)	5,063	1,244.14 square versts (1,415.91 km^{2}; 546.69 mi^{2})
Rayon pomoshchn. ego. (Район помощн. его.)	4,768	–

== Demographics ==
=== Russian Empire Census ===
According to the Russian Empire Census, the Andiyskiy okrug had a population of 49,628 on 28 January [O.S. 15 January] 1897, including 24,537 men and 25,091 women. The majority of the population indicated Avar to be their mother tongue.

Linguistic composition of the Andiyskiy okrug in 1897
Language	Native speakers	%
Avar-Andean	48,637	98.00
Chechen	711	1.43
Ukrainian	84	0.17
Russian	64	0.13
Kazi-Kumukh	27	0.05
Kumyk	24	0.05
Tatar (Note: Before 1918, Azerbaijanis were generally known as "Tatars". This term, employed by the Russians, referred to Turkic-speaking Muslims of the South Caucasus. After 1918, with the establishment of the Azerbaijan Democratic Republic and "especially during the Soviet era", the Tatar group identified itself as "Azerbaijani".)	15	0.03
Armenian	12	0.02
Georgian	12	0.02
Dargin	9	0.02
Tat	8	0.02
Lithuanian	5	0.01
Polish	5	0.01
German	1	0.00
Kyurin	1	0.00
Other	13	0.03
TOTAL	49,628	100.00

=== Kavkazskiy kalendar ===
According to the 1917 publication of Kavkazskiy kalendar, the Andiyskiy okrug had a population of 57,875 on 14 January [O.S. 1 January] 1916, including 29,747 men and 28,128 women, 56,950 of whom were the permanent population, and 925 were temporary residents:

Nationality	Number	%
North Caucasians	57,555	99.45
Russians	278	0.48
Other Europeans	38	0.07
Armenians	4	0.01
TOTAL	57,875	100.00

== Bibliography ==
- Bournoutian, George A. (2018). Armenia and Imperial Decline: The Yerevan Province, 1900–1914. Milton Park, Abingdon, Oxon: Routledge. ISBN 978-1-351-06260-2. OCLC 1037283914.
- Hovannisian, Richard G. (1971). The Republic of Armenia. Vol. 1: The First Year, 1918–1919. Berkeley: University of California Press. ISBN 978-0520019843.
- Кавказский календарь на 1913 год [Caucasian calendar for 1913] (in Russian) (68th ed.). Tiflis: Tipografiya kantselyarii Ye.I.V. na Kavkaze, kazenny dom. 1913. Archived from the original on 19 April 2022.
- Кавказский календарь на 1917 год [Caucasian calendar for 1917] (in Russian) (72nd ed.). Tiflis: Tipografiya kantselyarii Ye.I.V. na Kavkaze, kazenny dom. 1917. Archived from the original on 4 November 2021.
- Tsutsiev, Arthur (2014). Atlas of the Ethno-Political History of the Caucasus (PDF). Translated by Nora Seligman Favorov. New Haven: Yale University Press. ISBN 9780300153088. Archived (PDF) from the original on 17 June 2023.
