= Aleksandr Baryatinsky =

Russian general and field marshal (1815–1879)

His Serene Highness Prince Alexander Baryatinsky
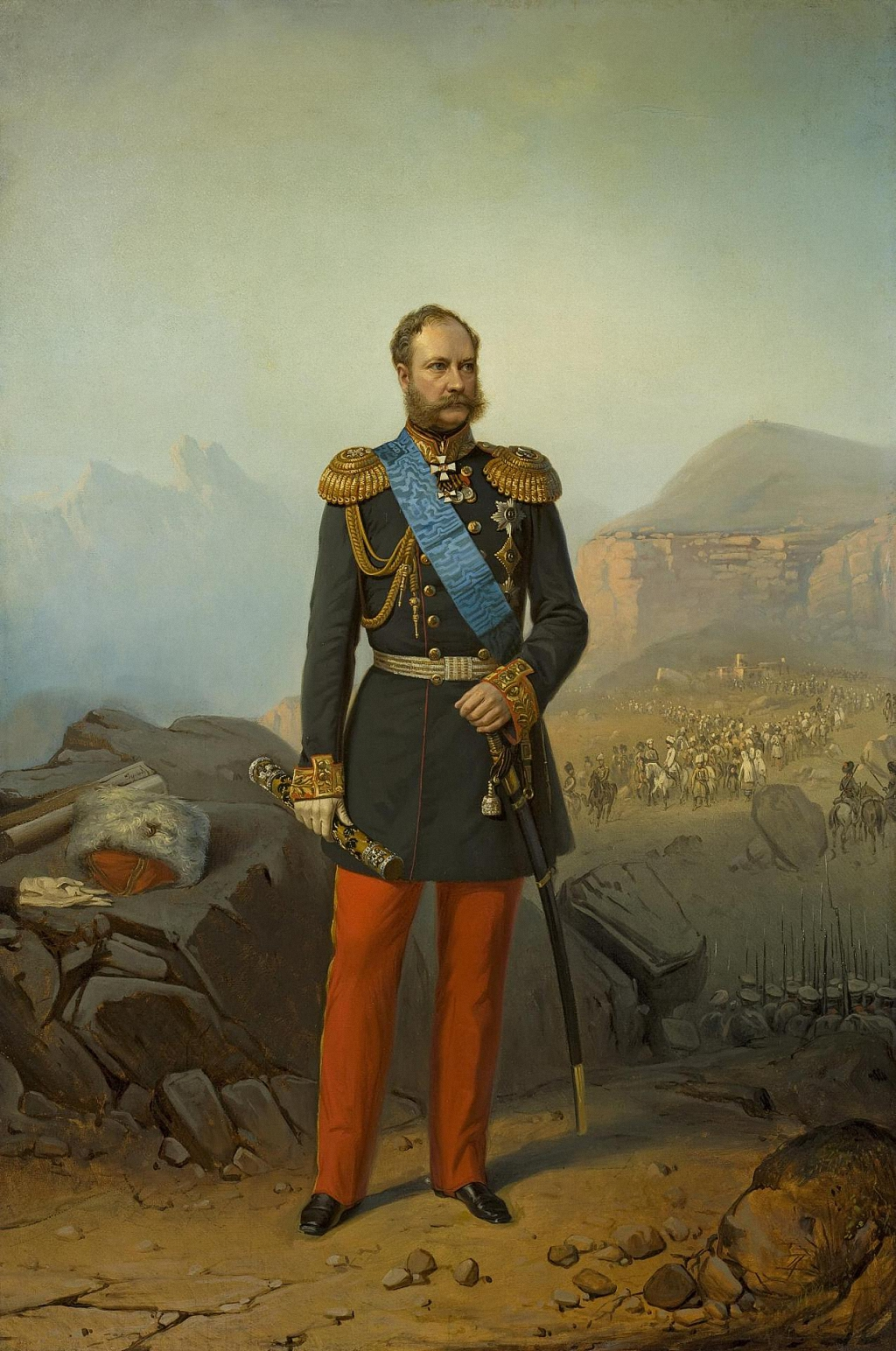
- Portrait by Georg von Bothmann, c. 1860s

Viceroy of Caucasus
- In office 22 July 1856 – 18 December 1862
- Preceded by: Nikolay Muravyov-Karsky
- Succeeded by: Grigol Orbeliani

Personal details
- Born: 14 May [O.S. 2 May] 1815 Ivanovo, Kursk Governorate, Russia
- Died: 9 March 1879 (aged 63) Geneva, Switzerland
- Awards: Order of St. Andrew; Order of St. George; Order of St. Vladimir; Order of Saint Anna

Military service
- Allegiance: Russia
- Branch/service: Imperial Russian Army
- Years of service: 1833–1862
- Rank: Generalfeldmarschall
- Battles/wars: Caucasian War; Battle of Ghunib; Kraków Uprising; Crimean War

Prince Aleksandr Ivanovich Baryatinsky (Russian: Алекса́ндр Ива́нович Баря́тинский, romanized: Aleksandr Ivanovich Baryatinsky; 14 May [O.S. 2 May] 1815 – 9 March 1879) was a Russian general and field marshal (from 1859), prince, and governor of the Caucasus.

== Early life and background ==
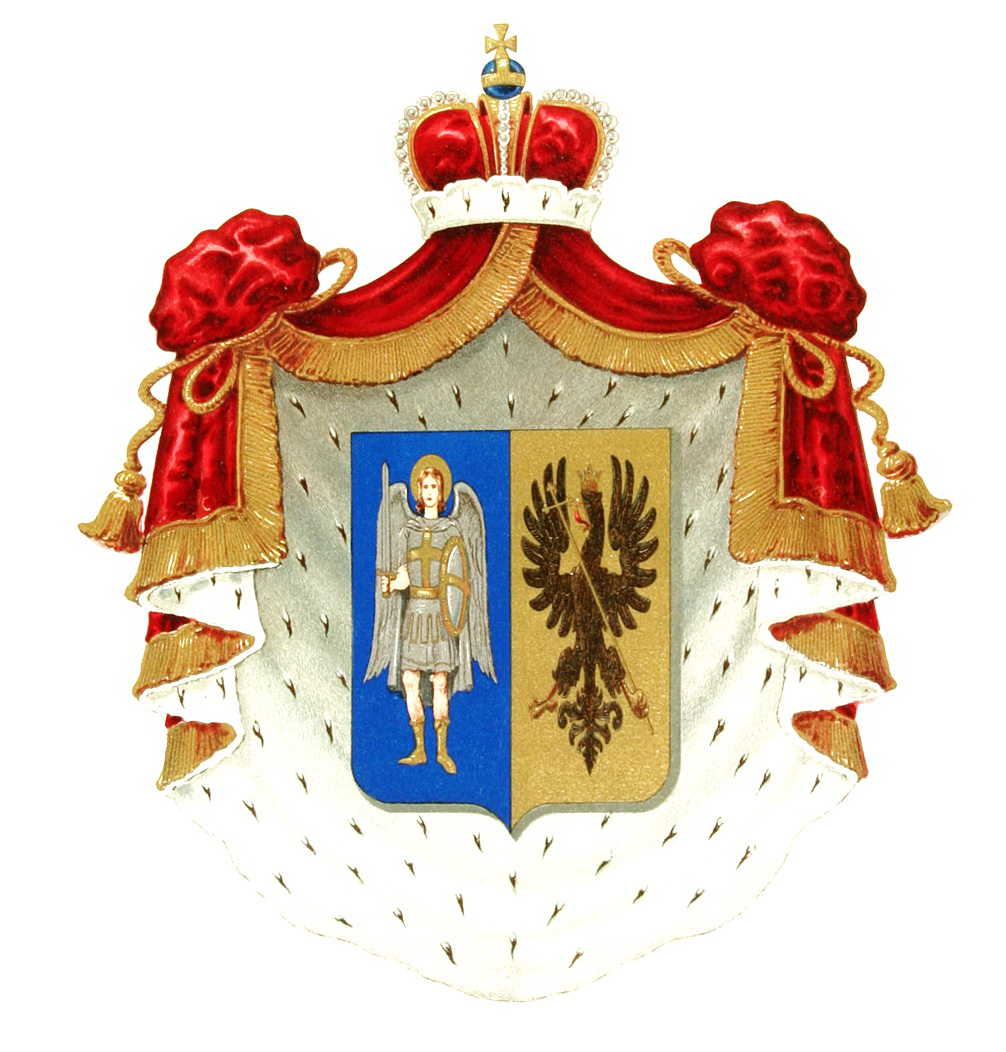
Coat of arms of the Princes Baryatinsky

He was born into the aristocratic Baryatinsky family, a scion of the Rurik dynasty, on 14 May 1815 in Ivanovsky village of Lgovsky district in Kursk Governorate. His father, Prince Ivan Ivanovich Baryatinsky (1767–1825), son of Princess Catherine of Schleswig-Holstein-Sonderburg-Beck, was one of the wealthiest people in Russia, having inherited numerous estates and about 35,000 serfs.

His mother was Countess Marie Wilhelmine von Keller (1792–1858), daughter of a Bavarian diplomat, Count Dorotheus Ludwig Christoph von Keller (1757–1827) and his younger German wife, Countess Amalie Luise of Sayn-Wittgenstein-Ludwigsburg (1771–1853), younger sister of the Russian field marshal Peter Wittgenstein.

== Education and career ==
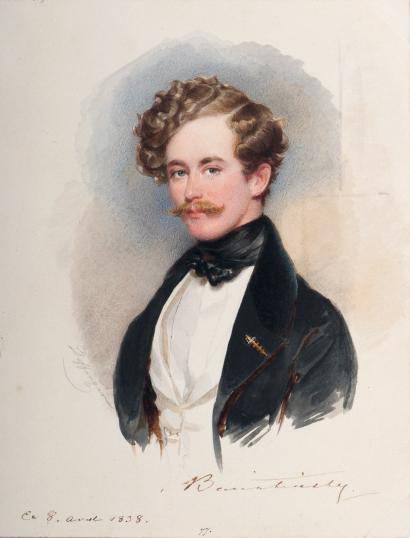
Young Baryatinsky

He was the eldest son and received an excellent education at home. His father died in 1825, when Alexander was merely 10 years old. His mother took him along with his second son Vladimir to Moscow for "improvement in the sciences" in 1829. The upbringing of both brothers was carried out by an Englishman – Thomas Evans, a well-known teacher at that time, who taught young men "classics and literature."

Baryatinsky entered the school of the ensigns of the Guard in his seventeenth year and, on 8 November 1833, received his commission of cornet in the Life Guards of the future Tsar Alexander II. In 1835, he served with great gallantry in the Caucasus, and on his return to St.Petersburg was rewarded with a golden sword for valour. On 1 January 1836, he was attached to the suite of Alexander, and in 1845 was again ordered off to the Caucasus and again most brilliantly distinguished himself, especially in the attack on Shamil's stronghold, for which he received the Order of St. George. In 1846, he assisted Field Marshal Ivan Paskevich to suppress the Kraków Uprising. From 1848 to 1856 he took a leading part in all the chief military events in the Caucasus, his most notable exploits being his victory at Mezeninsk in 1850 and his operations against Shamil in Chechnya.

His energetic and at the same time systematic tactics inaugurated a new era of mountain warfare. On 6 January 1853, he was appointed adjutant general and, on 5 July of the same year, chief of staff. In 1854, he took part in the brilliant Kurbsk Dere campaign. On 1 January 1856, he became commander-in-chief of the Caucasian army, and, subsequently, viceroy of the Caucasus. Within three years of his appointment, the whole of the eastern Caucasus was subdued and the long elusive Shamil was taken captive at the Storming of Ghunib. Baryatinsky also conquered many of the tribes of the western Caucasus dwelling between the rivers of Laba and Belaya.

== Final years and death ==
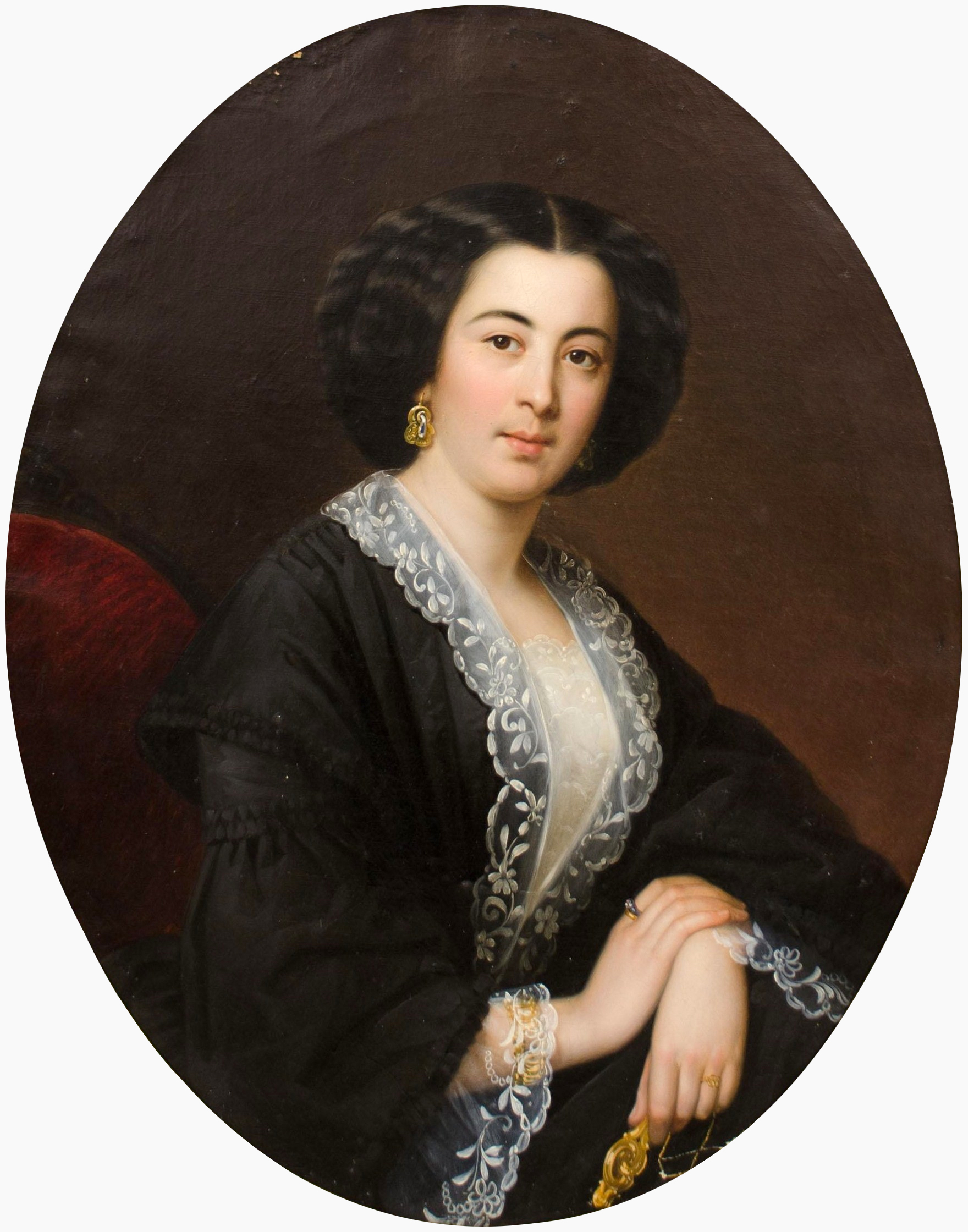
Portrait of Baryatinsky's Georgian wife, Princess Elizabeth Orbeliani, relationship with whom resulted in a duel, painted by Gavriil Yakovlev (1850s)

By the early 1860s, Baryatinsky's health had seriously deteriorated and he resigned from his position due to gout. During this period, Baryatinsky's life was marked by scandal because of his years-long romantic attachment to the Georgian Princess Elisabeth Orbeliani (1833–1899), granddaughter of Vakhtang Orbeliani, who was still married to Colonel Vladimir Davydov (1816–1886), son of Alexander Lvovich Davydov. Baryatinsky ended up challenging Davydov to a duel and then "induced" him to divorce Elizabeth so that he could marry her himself. Baryatinsky's union with Elizabeth ultimately received the blessing of Emperor Alexander II and was concluded in 1862.

After his marriage, Prince Baryatinsky lived abroad for a long time. He criticized the military reforms carried out by Dmitry Milyutin (formerly his chief of staff in the Caucasus). The mouthpiece of the conservative circles Rostislav Fadeev, was a protégé of Baryatinsky. By publishing a detailed account of the history of the Caucasian War, Fadeev hoped to draw public attention to the person of the retired field marshal in order to prepare his return to the political scene.

Subsequently, Baryatinsky made several attempts to return to the service, but he was tactfully denied this. In 1871 he was enlisted in Imperial cuirassier regiment and was appointed chief of the 2nd rifle battalion. The German emperor also honored Baryatinsky's merits by appointing him chief of the 14th hussar regiment of the German army. At the beginning of the Russo-Turkish war, it was expected that the emperor would appoint Baryatinsky as commander-in-chief, but the sovereign entrusted this post to his brother. He spent the last days of his life abroad and died of heart disease in Geneva, after forty-eight years of active service.

== Political views ==
In the 1860s, Baryatinsky's views shifted towards Slavophilism, more precisely, Pan-Slavism. When, in 1866, Prussia unleashed the Austro-Prussian War, Baryatinsky offered the Russian government an alliance with Prussia in order to divide the Austrian Empire: the Slavic lands were to go to Russia, the German lands to Prussia, and Hungary to become independent. But a special secret committee under the emperor rejected this plan. He saw halting of British advance in Asia as a matter of urgency. He is also remembered for overseeing and advocating the expulsion and genocide of the Circassians.

== Awards ==
=== Domestic awards ===
- Gold weapon for Bravery (1836)
- Order of St. George, 4th degree (July 7 (19), 1845)
- Order of St. Vladimir 4th degree with a bow (1848)
- Order of St. Anna 1st degree (1851)
- Order of St. George 3rd degree (August 9 (21), 1854)
- Order of the White Eagle (1856)
- Order of St. Alexander Nevsky (1857)
- Order of St. Vladimir 1st class with swords (1859)
- Order of St. George, 2nd degree (08/10/1859)
- Order of the Holy Apostle Andrew the First-Called with swords over the order (8 (20) September 1859)
- Diamond signs to the order of the Holy Apostle Andrew the First-Called with swords over the order (December 6 (18), 1862)
- Gold sword decorated with diamonds with the inscription "In memory of the conquest of the Caucasus" (1864)

=== Foreign awards ===
- Kingdom of Prussia:
  - Knight of the Order of the Red Eagle, 3rd Class, 1838
  - Knight of Honour of the Order of Saint John of Jerusalem, 20 July 1840
  - Knight of the Order of the Black Eagle, 10 February 1863
- Austrian Empire
  - Order of Leopold 3rd degree (1839)
  - Royal Hungarian Order of St. Stephen Grand Cross (1874)
- Kingdom of Württemberg
  - Order of the Crown 3rd degree (1839)
- Grand Duchy of Baden
  - Order of the Zähringer Lion, 3rd degree (1839)
  - House Order of Fidelity (1861)
- Kingdom of Saxony
  - Order of Civil Merit (1840)
- Grand Duchy of Saxe-Weimar-Eisenach
  - Order of the White Falcon 3rd degree (1840)
- Grand Duchy of Hesse
  - Order of Ludwig 1st degree (1843)
- Kingdom of the Netherlands
  - Order of the Oak Crown, 2nd degree (1844)
  - Military Order of William, Grand Cross (1860)
- Qajar Iran
  - Order of the Lion and the Sun 1st degree (1852)
- Third French Republic
  - Legion of Honour, Grand Cross (1875)

== See also ==
- Alexander Vladimirovich Baryatinsky
- Yury Baryatinsky
- Leonilla Bariatinskaya

== Literature ==
- Rieber, Alfred J., ed. (1966). The Politics of Autocracy. Letters of Alexander II to Prince A. I. Bariatinskii 1857–1864. Paris/The Hague: Mouton & Co. OCLC 882554.
