= Gunibsky District =

Gunibsky District Гунибский район (Russian)
- District

Other transcription(s)
  - Avar: Гъуниб мухъ
  - Dargwa: Гъунибла къатI
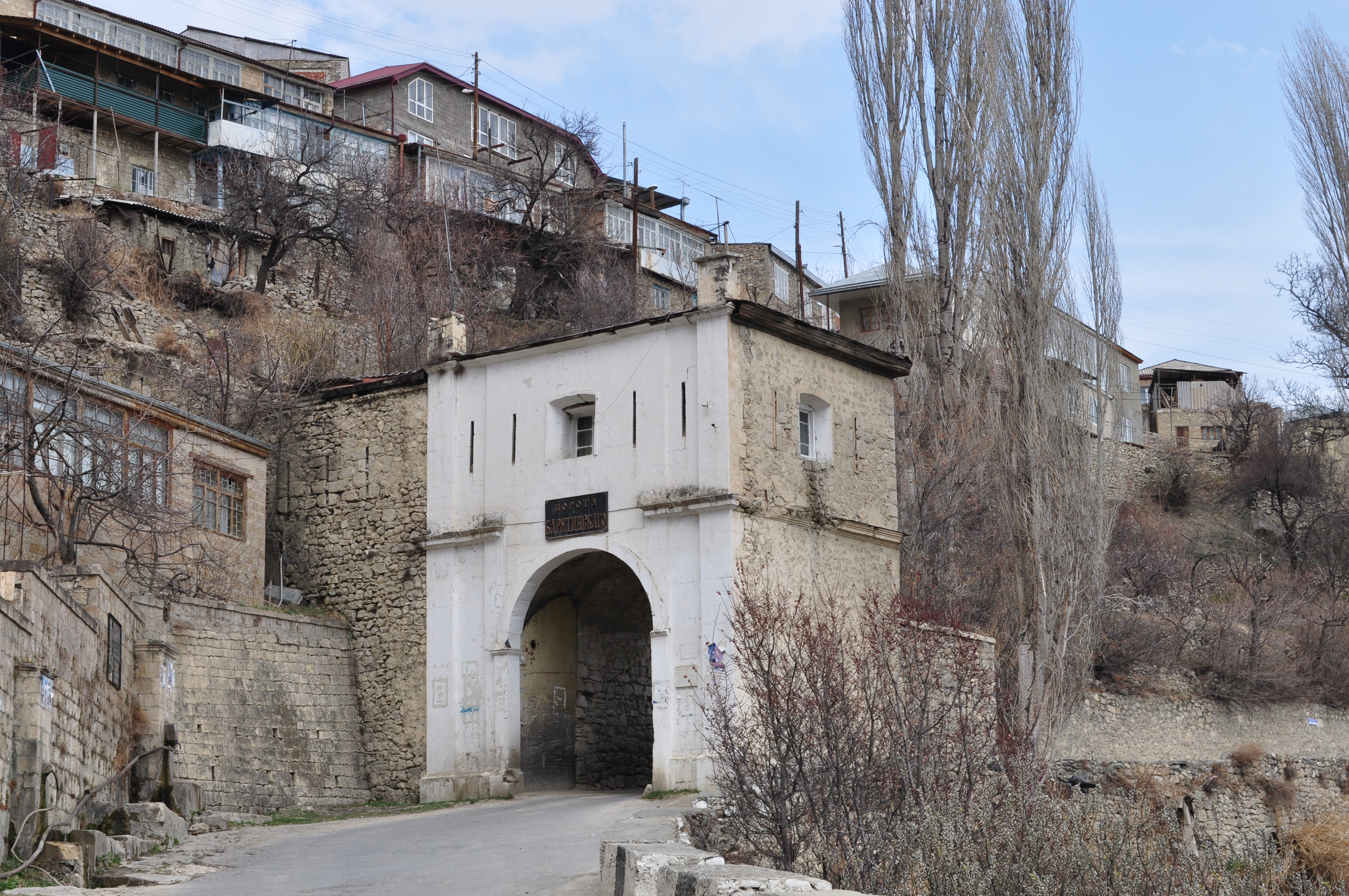
- The gates of Gunib fortress, a cultural heritage object in Gunibsky District

- Flag Coat of arms
- Location of Gunibsky District in the Republic of Dagestan
- Coordinates: 42°23′N 46°58′E
- Country: Russia
- Federal subject: Republic of Daghestan
- Established: June 3, 1929
- Administrative center: Gunib

Area
  - Total: 609.5 km^{2} (235.3 sq mi)

Population (2010 Census)
  - Total: 25,303
  - Density: 41.51/km^{2} (107.5/sq mi)
  - Urban: 0%
  - Rural: 100%

Administrative structure
  - Administrative divisions: 10 Selsoviets
  - Inhabited localities: 67 rural localities

Municipal structure
  - Municipally incorporated as: Gunibsky Municipal District
  - Municipal divisions: 0 urban settlements, 18 rural settlements
- Time zone: UTC+3 (MSK)
- OKTMO ID: 82616000
- Website: http://www.gunib.ru

Population of Gunibsky District
- 2010 Census: 25,303
- 2002 Census: 25,106
- 1989 Census: 16,146
- 1979 Census: 20,693

Gunibsky District (Russian: Гуни́бский райо́н; Avar: Гъуниб мухъ) is an administrative and municipal district (raion), one of the forty-one in the Republic of Daghestan, Russia. It is located in the center of the republic. The area of the district is 609.5 square kilometers (235.3 sq mi). Its administrative center is the rural locality (a selo) of Gunib. As of the 2010 Census, the total population of the district was 25,303, with the population of Gunib accounting for 9.0% of that number.

== History ==
Gunib was historically important as a natural fortress during the Caucasian War of the 19th century. Imam Shamil, leader of the Chechen and Dagestani tribes, made his last stand against the Russians at Gunib, where he gave himself up to the Russian commander, Prince Aleksandr Baryatinsky, on August 25, 1859.

Gunibsky Canton in the borders of modern Gunibsky District was established in 1928. It was transformed into a district along with other cantons on June 3, 1929.

== Administrative and municipal status ==
Within the framework of administrative divisions, Gunibsky District is one of the forty-one in the Republic of Dagestan. The district is divided into ten selsoviets which comprise sixty-seven rural localities. As a municipal division, the district is incorporated as Gunibsky Municipal District. Its ten selsoviets are incorporated as eighteen rural settlements within the municipal district. The selo of Gunib serves as the administrative center of both the administrative and municipal district.
