= Gunib =

Village in Dagestan, Russia

Coordinates: 42°23′12″N 46°57′42″E

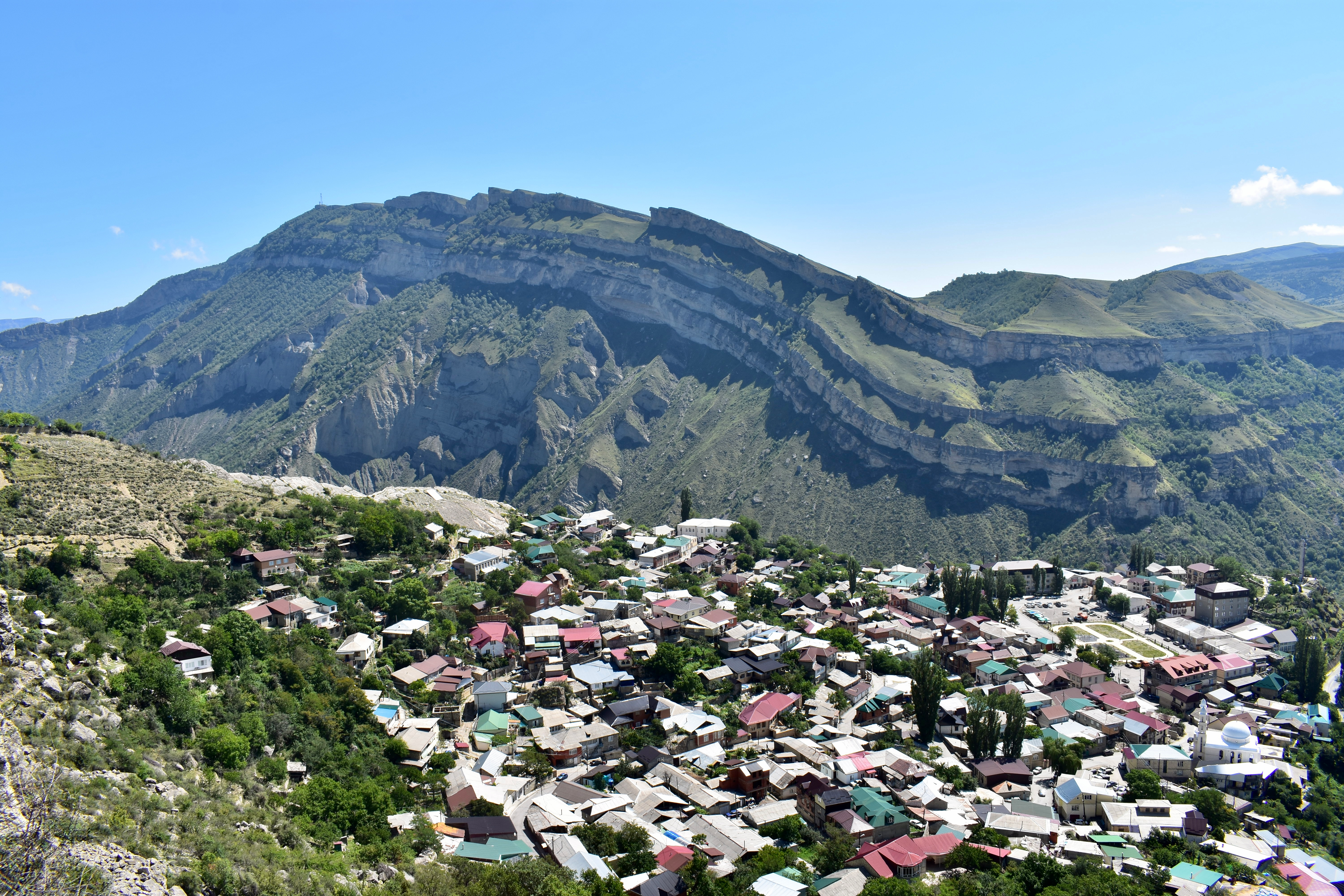
Modern view of Gunib

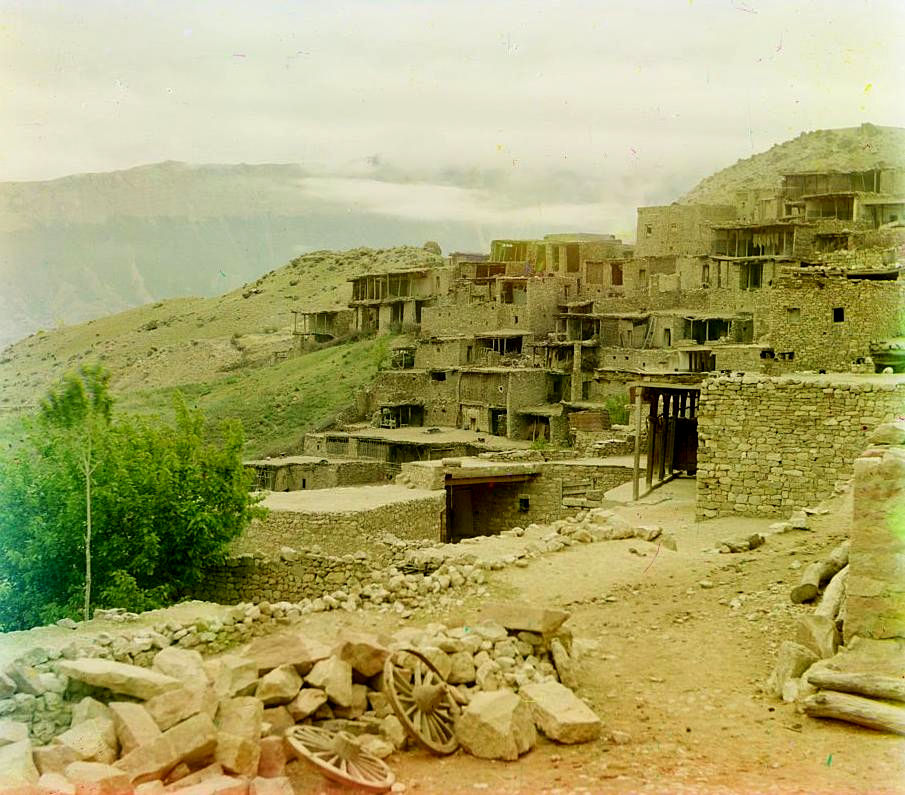
A photograph of Gunib by Sergey Prokudin-Gorsky (between 1905 and 1915)

Gunib (Avar: Гъуниб), also spelled Ghunib, is a rural locality (a selo) and the administrative center of Ghunib District of the Republic of Daghestan. Population: 2,406 (2002 Census); 2,405 (1989 Soviet census). After the dissolution of the Soviet Union, the population of Gunib went into decline. Only in 2014 did it reach its Soviet-era population again.

== History ==
Ghunib was historically important as a natural fortress during the Caucasian War of the 19th century. Imam Shamil, leader of the Chechen and Daghestani tribes, made his last stand against the Russians at Ghunib, where he gave himself up to the Russian commander, Prince Alexander Baryatinsky, on 25 August 1859. The name is derived from the Avar word Guni-meer which translates to heap of stones. Olga Forsh was born in Ghunib in 1873.

In 1895, the town housed the barracks of the Samur regiment and the Terek-Dagestan fortress artillery, and grew into a self-sufficient entity with merchants, conscripts, an Orthodox church, and a post office. During the Russian Empire, the settlement was the administrative capital of the Gunibsky Okrug.
