= Uzun-Hajji =

North Caucasian religious, military, and political leader (1848–1920)

Uzun Hajji
- صالثسا وزن حجي; Узун ХӀажи
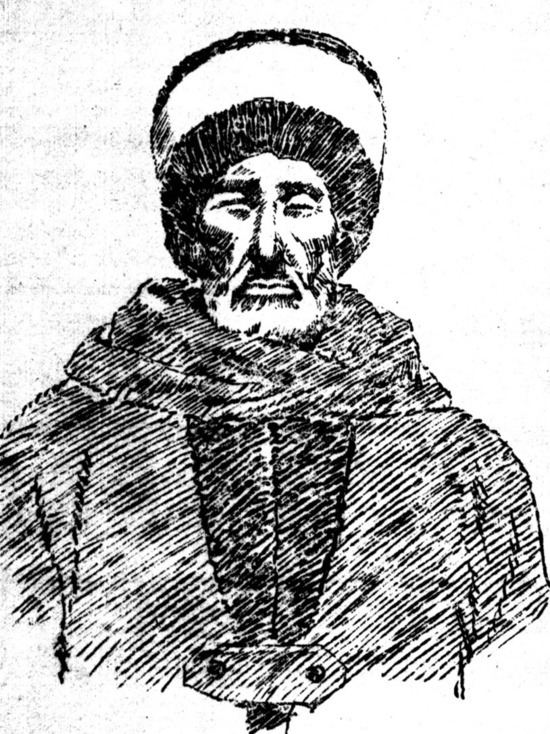
- 1920 portrait of Uzun-Hajji by Xalilbeg Musajasul
- Title: Sheikh; Imam; Emir

Personal life
- Born: 1848 Salta, Caucasian Imamate (now Republic of Dagestan, Russia)
- Died: 30 March 1920 (aged 71–72) Vedeno, North Caucasian Emirate (now Chechnya, Russia)
- Cause of death: Typhus
- Region: North Caucasus
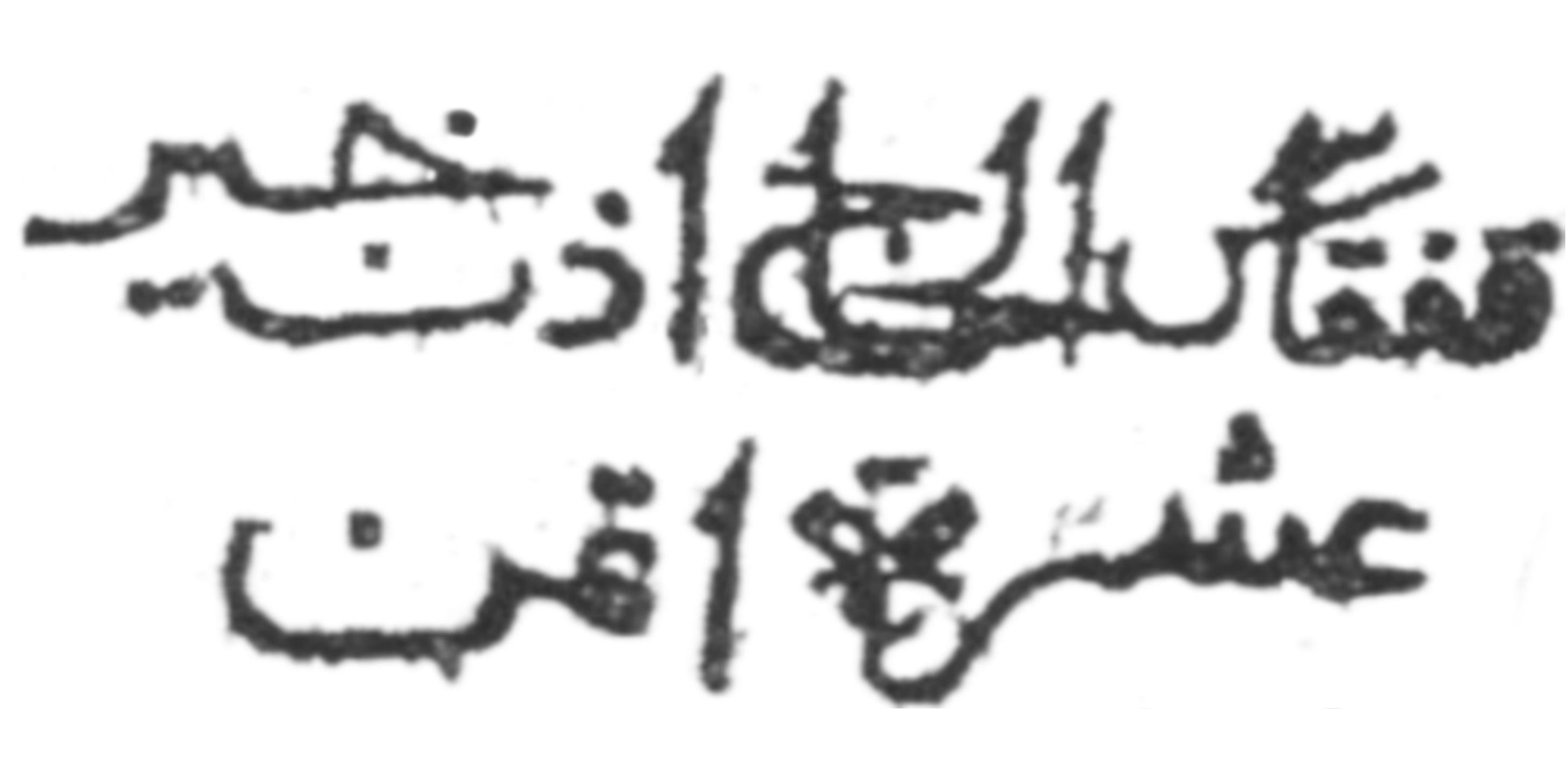
- Signature

Religious life
- Religion: Sunni Islam
- Denomination: Sufism
- Sect: Naqshbandi

Senior posting
- Based in: Dagestan
- Period in office: 1917–1920

Imam of Dagestan and Chechnya
- In office May 1919 – 30 March 1920; Disputed with Najmuddin of Gotzo
- Preceded by: Najmuddin of Gotzo
- Succeeded by: Najmuddin of Gotzo

Emir of the North Caucasus
- In office September 1919 – 30 March 1920
- Grand Vizier: Dervish-Muhammad-Hajji
- Preceded by: Position established
- Succeeded by: Dervish-Muhammad-Hajji

Military service
- Allegiance: Mountainous Republic of the Northern Caucasus; North Caucasian Emirate
- Battles/wars: 1877 North Caucasian uprising; Russian Civil War; Battle of the Northern Caucasus (1918–1919); White Russian invasion of Dagestan; 1919–1920 Dagestan uprising

Uzun-Hajji of Salta (Note: Avar: СалтӀаса Узун ХӀажи, romanized: Salţasa Uzun Ħaƶi, Arabic: صالثسا وزن حجا; Arabic: حاج اذن خير, romanized: Ḥāj Idhn Khayr; Russian: Узу́н-Хаджи́ Салтинский, romanized: Uzun-Khadzhi Saltinsky) (1848 – 30 March 1920) was a North Caucasian religious, military, and political leader who was Emir of the North Caucasian Emirate during the Russian Civil War. The sheikh of a Naqshbandi Sufi tariqa and a political exile prior to the Russian Revolution, he was one of the leaders of the Dagestan National Committee in the Mountainous Republic of the Northern Caucasus, and he served as a member of parliament for the country.

Uzun-Hajji fought both the Bolsheviks and the White movement during the Civil War, seeking to establish an independent theocracy in the North Caucasus. His attempt to establish an emirate of his own lasted for seven months, with extensive support from the Democratic Republic of Georgia, before it successfully expelled White forces from the North Caucasus. He died shortly after, and the Soviet government took control of the region in the aftermath.

== Early life and career ==
Uzun (Note: Hajji is an honorific title referring to one who has undertaken the hajj pilgrimage. While he is commonly referred to as Uzun-Hajji, his given name was simply "Uzun".) was born in 1848 to a family in the ethnically-Avar village of Salta, Dagestan, to a family of peasants. From the age of seven, he studied under several local aalimath as a murid. Among his teachers was Abdurrahman-Hajji as-Suguri, the sheikh of a Naqshbandi tariqa from the village of Sogratl. After obtaining an ijazah from Abdurrahman-Hajji, Uzun travelled to the Ottoman Empire in order to further study Islam. During this time, he also undertook the hajj, becoming known as Uzun-Hajji.

=== Pre-revolutionary activities ===
In 1877, amidst the Russo-Turkish War, Uzun-Hajji joined the North Caucasian uprising on the side of the rebels. Following the uprising's defeat by the Russian government, he was arrested the next year and sentenced to seven years of internal exile in Samara Governorate. Uzun-Hajji was one of six Muslim religious leaders to be sent into internal exile, alongside Ilyas ibn Muhammad al-Zhudqari, Abdulla-Hajji al-Gimravi, Muhammad-Hajji Osmanov of Kikuni, Suleiman-Hajji of Apshi, and Musa-Hajji of Kukni. After four years in exile, Uzun-Hajji escaped and returned home, but in 1910 he was again arrested after constructing a mosque in his home village of Salta without requesting permission from the government. He spent a year under house arrest before being moved to Temir-Khan-Shura, and then to Astrakhan.

After another year of imprisonment in Astrakhan, Uzun-Hajji again escaped, this time to Mecca. He returned to the Russian Empire soon after, alongside Chechen pilgrims, and settled in Chechnya. At this time, he lived in Grozny and Nozhay-Yurt. These two periods in exile established a reputation for Uzun-Hajji as a person who had personally suffered from the Tsarist autocracy. Prior to the Russian Revolution, he lived in the highlands of Chechnya, participating in protests against the rule of the Tsars and writing religious poetry.

== Revolution ==
=== Participation in the Union of Highlanders ===
Following the 1917 February Revolution, Uzun-Hajji was amnestied and allowed to return to Dagestan. Upon his return, he quickly joined the political life of the newly established Union of Highlanders of the Northern Caucasus as a supporter of Islamic theocracy and sharia. Uzun-Hajji was one of the organisers of the Dagestan National Committee, and he organised a referendum on the adoption of sharia in Dagestan; the referendum resulted in a majority of all villages voting in favour. (Note: At this time, the term "sharia" lacked the present-day connotations with radical forms of Islamism. It was commonly used in the Northern Caucasus as a populist political slogan calling for law and order against crime, which had surged following the Revolution.)

Uzun-Hajji was also a member of the parliament of the Union of Highlanders (which later became an independent state under the name of the Mountainous Republic of the Northern Caucasus). During his tenure he was effectively a part of the opposition, placing intense pressure on the government to reveal how financial loans from the Azerbaijan Democratic Republic had been spent. During the summer of 1917, he also took an active interest in education, speaking out in favour of Arabisation. According to Uzun-Hajji's vision, Kumyk was to become the inter-ethnic language, although students would be taught in their native language. Lessons on sharia were to be introduced in the first grade, followed by Kumyk in the third grade. Arabic was to be introduced in the later grades of primary school.

Politically, Uzun-Hajji was also a leader of the Dagestan National Committee, which was one of the two political blocs in Dagestan during the Russian Revolution. Alongside alim Najmuddin of Gotzo, Uzun-Hajji advanced the concept of the restoration of Imam Shamil's Caucasian Imamate, which Najmuddin was to serve as imam of with Uzun-Hajji as wakil. Uzun-Hajji's Islamist views were depicted by socialist political opponents as him being opposed to modernity in general, and he was quoted as saying, "I am weaving a rope with which to hang students, engineers, and in general all who write from left to right" in socialist propaganda leaflets, which were distributed throughout Dagestan. He strongly resisted such characterisations, complaining,

How could I utter such nonsense! After all, we cannot get by without a secular intelligentsia. If we do not have such specialists as doctors, for example, then they should be invited from other regions. They are lying about me, and these rumours are spread by those who want to cause the people to mistrust me.

Uzun-Hajji was active during the leadup to the Andi Congress, a congress of the Union of Highlanders which Najmuddin had forced members to agree to in order to have himself appointed as imam. Uzun-Hajji gathered 5,000 Chechens and Dagestani highlanders to attend the congress, as they were among the most likely backers of the imamate's restoration. In an unexpected defeat, however, those present refused to restore the imamate, as they believed it would lead to a sectarian conflict against the Georgians and Azerbaijanis.

At the same conference, Uzun-Hajji put forward a five-point plan for land reform in Dagestan:

1. All lands of Dagestan formerly at the disposal of the Tsarist government are returned to the Dagestani people.
2. The waters of the Caspian Sea included in the borders of Dagestan are transferred to the disposal of the Dagestani people as inalienable property.
3. All the lands of the beys are transferred without charge to the Dagestani people.
4. The lands transferred by the beys to other people are also transferred to the property of the Dagestani people without charge.
5. The lands purchased by other people from the beys are transferred to the Dagestani people as property, bought at cost price.

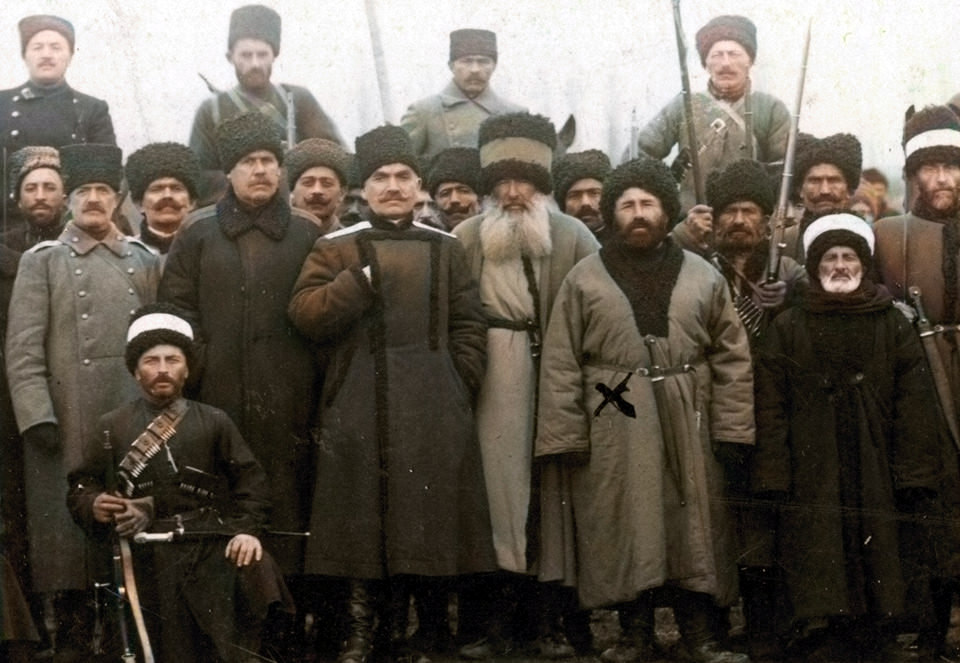
Leaders of the March on Temir-Khan-Shura, January 1918. Uzun-Hajji is first from right.

Following the withdraw of the Imperial Russian Army from fortresses in Dagestan, Uzun-Hajji and his supporters took control of the village of Gunib and removed those loyal to the Armed Forces of Dagestan Executive Committee, the formal military in the region. After a short time, he withdrew from the village and returned control to the executive committee.

On 9 January 1918, Uzun-Hajji and Najmuddin marched on Temir-Khan-Shura along with between six and ten thousand supporters, seeking to establish Najmuddin as imam. Najmuddin was appointed as imam by a local congregational mosque the next day, but three days after that, the Dagestan Congress annulled the appointment. After Najmuddin returned to his former status as Mufti of the North Caucasus, Uzun-Hajji gathered his forces and abandoned the mufti for the mountains, dissatisfied with his unwillingness to enforce his desire to become imam. After Uzun-Hajji left for the mountains, his troops began engaging in violence against ethnic Russians, such as Russian settlers and the Terek Cossacks.

=== During the Russian Civil War ===
==== Against the Reds ====
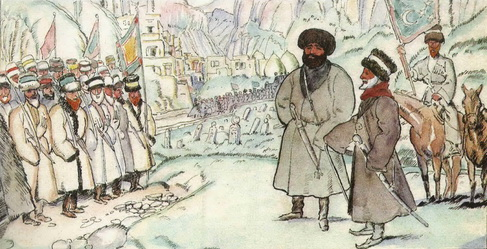
Najmuddin of Gotzo and Uzun-Hajji of Salta in Gergebil, a 1919 artwork by Xalilbeg Musajasul

The Red Army invaded Dagestan in March 1918, bringing the Russian Civil War to the North Caucasus. In May of the same year, detachments under Najmuddin, Uzun-Hajji, and other military commanders met in Gunib. Najmuddin was recognised as Imam of Dagestan and Chechnya, and it was decided that in order to recapture the occupied Temir-Khan-Shura it was necessary to launch a three-pronged offensive, targeting Arakani, Chir-Yurt, and both Kazi-Kumukh and Tsudakhar.

At Tsudakhar, Uzun-Hajji's detachment was blocked from entering the village by local sheikh and military commander Ali-Hajji of Akusha. Ali-Hajji sent a delegation to Uzun-Hajji's detachment attempting to convince him against entering the village on four occasions, with Uzun-Hajji refusing each time and threatening to fight Ali-Hajji's forces if he was forbidden from entering. After another sheikh sided with Ali-Hajji, Uzun-Hajji decided to return to Gunib rather than fighting.

Clashes between the Red Army and forces loyal to Najmuddin and Uzun-Hajji continued until August 1918, when Lazar Bicherakhov and his forces left the Battle of Baku and launched a campaign in Dagestan. By October, Bicherakhov's armies had completely forced the Red Army out of Dagestan, and they were themselves forced out by an Ottoman offensive a month later. The rule of the Mountainous Republic of the Northern Caucasus in Dagestan was fully restored on 7 November, when Ottoman forces captured Port-Petrovsk (today Makhachkala).

Following the end of World War I, Uzun-Hajji became a critic of the Mountainous Republic's efforts to establish relations with the Allies, and he called for the removal of British troops from Dagestan after they entered the region.

==== Against the Whites ====
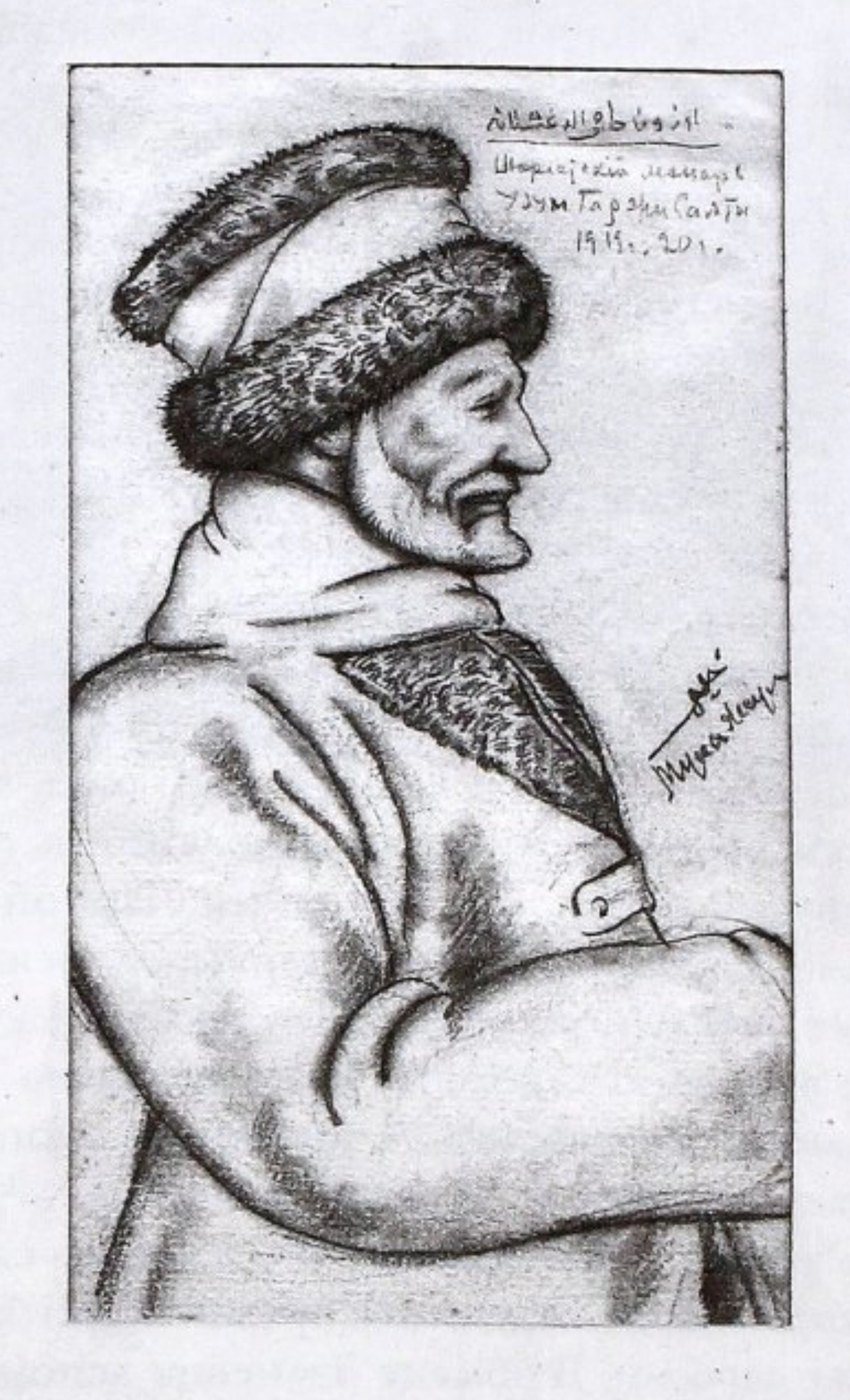
Portrait of Uzun-Hajji by Xalilbeg Musajasul, c. 1919–1920

In the winter of 1918–1919, the Volunteer Army of general Anton Denikin invaded the Northern Caucasus. The government of the Mountainous Republic convened a meeting, also including clerics such as Uzun-Hajji and Ali-Hajji. At the meeting, Uzun-Hajji stated

If we had to the current time worked, united, and organised, then no enemy would have dared to cross the border of our motherland. The first aalimath did not unite, and after them all was a dark mass. Muslims began to kill one another. Be that as it may, the past must be consigned to oblivion. Let us now, before a common danger ... unite, and then nobody will be able to defeat us ... Our sacred duty is to respond to the call of our brothers, Chechens and Ingush, otherwise we also will end up under the heel of the Cossacks ... From words can come nothing, let us get to business... let us awaken our sleeping people ... Ali-Hajji and I, no matter how old we may be, will go and die for the people.

From this point, he began to work alongside Ali-Hajji. The two would cooperate on gathering soldiers, as well as war plans. The two of them, as well as Najmuddin, each took separate positions in regards to the Russian Civil War; Ali-Hajji believed it was necessary to cooperate with the Bolsheviks, while Najmuddin supported the White movement that included Denikin. Uzun-Hajji, for his part, opposed both the Reds and Whites, and Najmuddin's support of the Whites disappointed him immensely. Upon Najmuddin's refusal to join the conflict against the Volunteer Army, he reportedly said "I tried to make an imam out of him, but he turned out to be an Ivan." Hajji-Murad Donogo, a Dagestani historian and political dissident, has denied that Uzun-Hajji ever said such a thing. In response to Najmuddin's proposal to work with the British against the Bolsheviks, Uzun-Hajji answered simply, "What difference does it make if the pig is black or white?"

In May 1919, a council gathered in the village of Botlikh. At the council, Uzun-Hajji was declared Imam of Dagestan and Chechnya, replacing Najmuddin. Among the sheikh's first moves as imam was to move the office's headquarters to Vedeno. After the move was completed, Uzun-Hajji issued a call to the Muslims of the North Caucasus in August, calling on them to engage in jihad against the White Russians.

Uzun-Hajji's forces fought both the Reds and Whites following the beginning of a large uprising, and the uprising's beginning led his ranks to swell in size. White sources estimated that in mid-summer 1919, 700 men were under Uzun-Hajji's command. After the uprising began in August, Denikin wrote that the sheikh now controlled 1,500 soldiers. Following a campaign to mobilise further troops in support of the uprising, this increased to an even greater 4,000–5,000, according to Denikin. An Azerbaijani diplomat described Uzun-Hajji's army as containing 3,000 insurgents in September 1919, while a report to Vladimir Lenin in 1920 claimed that as many as 8,500 people were fighting in the army. According to Chechen historian Mairbek Vatchagaev, the true number of Uzun-Hajji's army was never above 1,000.

Following the failure of an offensive in Dagestan, Uzun-Hajji determined to limit direct confrontations to the Whites to Chechnya. However, he maintained a large guerrilla force across most of the North Caucasus, from Dagestan to Circassia.

==== Declaration of the emirate ====
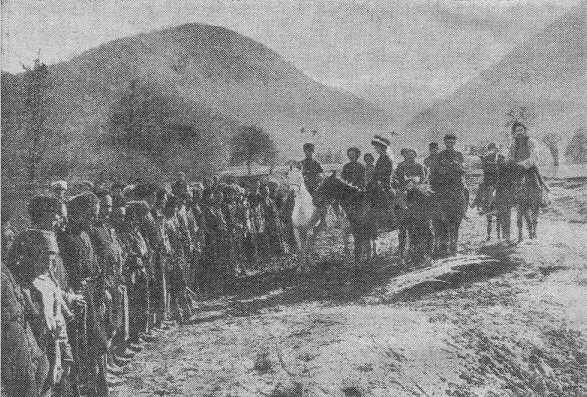
Uzun-Hajji overseeing a military parade of the North Caucasian Emirate, 1920

In the summer of 1919, Chechen insurgent commander Inaluk Arsanukayev delivered a firman, allegedly from Ottoman Sultan Mehmed VI, to Uzun-Hajji ordering the establishment of an Islamic theocracy. The letter is now believed to be a forgery, but on 19 September of that year, the establishment of the North Caucasian Emirate as a theocratic monarchy and Ottoman protectorate was announced.

Now officially titled emir, Uzun-Hajji quickly began establishing a formal state from rebel-controlled territories. The establishment of the emirate had a significant effect on the local populations of Ingushetia, Chechnya, and the Dagestani highlands, leading to further support for the uprising. By the autumn of 1919, Uzun-Hajji had managed to take control of all of the Chechen highlands, as well as partially in western Dagestan and the Ingush mountains. On 24 September, a group of pro-White Russian Chechens under the leadership of Ibragim Chulikov established a political committee in the Chechen plains with the stated goal of removing Uzun-Hajji and the Bolsheviks.

Uzun-Hajji also had poor relations with fellow insurgent Ali Mitayev, a Chechen sheikh who did not recognise his authority as emir. Mitayev later attempted to make amends with Uzun-Hajji by delivering weapons captured from White forces to Vedeno, but the gift was not accepted. On the other hand, Uzun-Hajji maintained connections to Ingush anti-Denikin leaders, such as sheikh Toarqo-Hajji Gardanaqan and Ğapur Oaxaräqhan. He was also in contact with the Security Council of the Northern Caucasus and Dagestan, a group run by Ali-Hajji that was also fighting the Whites.

After a series of defeats inflicted upon Red Army units under the command of Nikolai Gikalo, they evacuated to the North Caucasian highlands, where they were sheltered by Uzun-Hajji and welcomed as having a shared enemy. He further allowed the Red Army soldiers to return to combat under his command, organising a detachment comprising the soldiers. While this occurred, the forces under Gikalo's leadership gathered intelligence on the Emirate and carried out espionage activities.

In September 1919, a combined Emirate-Red Army force attacked the Whites at the settlement of Vozdvizhenskoye. In the ensuing battle, the settlement was captured despite the death of Chechen communist commander Aslanbek Sheripov, thus giving the rebels access to the Chechen plains. The Whites soon retreated to Grozny. Another victory was inflicted by Uzun-Hajji's soldiers upon the Volunteer Army at the village of Shali. At both Vozdvizhenskoye and Shali, around 250 Russians were taken as prisoners of war.

Uzun-Hajji's successes found him increasingly popular. The states of the South Caucasus – the First Republic of Armenia, the Azerbaijan Democratic Republic, and the Democratic Republic of Georgia – all sought to avoid a shared border with Russia, and viewed Uzun-Hajji as able to ensure such a result. Georgia in particular began providing military and materiel assistance to the emirate, and the two countries signed an agreement for Georgia to recognise the emirate and provide arms shipments. In return, Uzun-Hajji ordered his soldiers to block the Georgian Military Road, blocking the would-be primary route for White Russian forces into Georgia. A group of fifty officers from Georgia, under the command of Leo Kereselidze, arrived in the country, as did military instructors from the former Austro-Hungarian and German empires.

Within a short period of time from the establishment of the emirate, Uzun-Hajji oversaw the establishment of a state court, government, parliament, currency, prison system, military, and police force. The emirate's military successes prompted alarm from the White movement, and Najmuddin, along with other aalimath allied to Denikin, called on the Muslims of the North Caucasus to fight and kill Uzun-Hajji.

== Negotiations and death ==
In late March 1920, the Whites were expelled from the North Caucasus. The Red Army took control of Grozny. Uzun-Hajji sent a letter to the Bolsheviks demanding that they hand the city over to the emirate, but it was refused. Instead, the Bolsheviks put forward a demand of their own that Uzun-Hajji give all of his temporal power over to them in return for being allowed to retain the title of Imam of Chechnya and Dagestan.

At the time the demands were sent, Uzun-Hajji was already seriously ill with typhus, and he died shortly afterwards. Prior to his death, Gikalo had been issued an order to "place more pressure on Uzun-Hajji, and if possible, liquidate him." Anti-communists have since claimed that he was killed by the Bolsheviks via poisoning. He was buried in the hamlet of Shamil-Khutor, near Vedeno, in the same graveyard where the family of Imam Shamil had been buried. On 11 May 1920, following his death, a congress of highlanders convened in correspondence with his dying request. Per Uzun-Hajji's request, Kamil Shamil, the son of Imam Shamil and an Ottoman military commander, was offered the throne of the North Caucasus. He refused, citing his health, and his son Said Shamil went in his stead to become imam.

Uzun-Hajji was briefly succeeded by Dervish-Muhammad-Hajji as emir for a few days before the emirate ceased to exist.
