= Ali-Hajji of Akusha =

North Caucasian religious, military and political leader (1847–1930)

Ali of Akusha Hajji
- Ахъушан ГӀяли-ХӀяжи
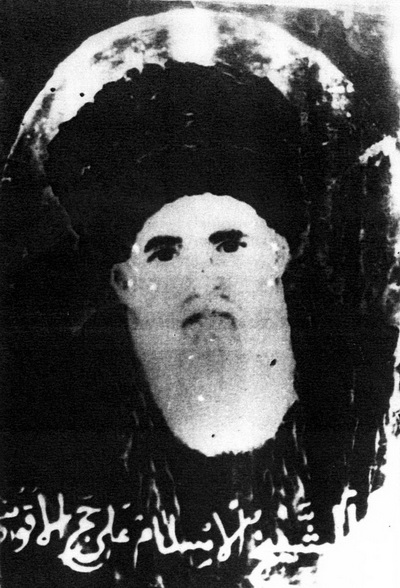
- Title: ʿĀlim; Qadi; Shaykh al-Islām

Personal life
- Born: 1847 Akusha, Akusha-Dargo Union
- Died: 8 April 1930 (aged 82–83) Akusha, Dagestan ASSR, Russian SFSR, Soviet Union (now Republic of Dagestan, Russia)
- Region: North Caucasus

Religious life
- Religion: Sunni Islam
- Denomination: Sufism
- Sect: Naqshbandi

Senior posting
- Based in: Akusha
- Period in office: 1890–1930

Chairman of the Security Council of the Northern Caucasus and Dagestan
- In office 19 October 1919 – 7 February 1920
- Preceded by: Position established
- Succeeded by: Sultan-Said Kazbekov

Military service
- Allegiance: Mountainous Republic of the Northern Caucasus; Russian SFSR
- Battles/wars: Russian Civil War; Battle of the Northern Caucasus (1918–1919); White Russian invasion of Dagestan; 1919–1920 Dagestan uprising

Ali-Hajji of Akusha (Note: Dargwa: Ахъушан ГӀяли-ХӀяжи, romanized: Aqušan ʿƏli-Ḥəži; Russian: Али-Хаджи Акушинский, romanized: Ali-Khadzhi Akushinsky.) (1847 – 8 April 1930) was a North Caucasian religious, military and political leader during the Russian Civil War. He was a shaykh al-Islām and chairman of the Security Council of the Northern Caucasus and Dagestan, a resistance group against the Armed Forces of South Russia during the White Russian invasion of Dagestan. Amidst the 1921–1928 Soviet anti-religious campaign he organised a group of religious leaders, forming a de facto parallel government in the Dargin District during the mid-1920s.

Born into the family of a muezzin, Ali-Hajji studied under several leading theologians in mid-19th century Dagestan, becoming a member of the ulama in his native village. Following the Russian Revolution he became a supporter of the Bolsheviks, believing that they would allow sharia in the North Caucasus. After the Soviet government adopted a policy of state atheism following the Civil War, Ali-Hajji went from a supporter to an opponent of Soviet rule, leading protests and organising a non-government system of Islamic education in the Dargin District. His family was arrested in 1928 on charges of organising an anti-government group, and he died in 1930. He was rehabilitated in 1989.

== Early life and career ==
Ali was born in 1847 in the village of Akusha, then under the Akusha-Dargo Union. His father was a muezzin at Akusha's congregational mosque, and Ali was first educated by his father before later studying at a local madrasa. After completing his madrasa studies, Ali was the student of some of the most well-known theologists in Dagestan at the time, including tariqa sheikh Abdurrahman-Hajji as-Suguri, Hajjila-Ali al-Aqoushi and Ilyas ibn Muhammad al-Zhudqari.

Ali considered leaving Dagestan to further his religious studies, but as-Suguri successfully convinced him to remain in the region, urging him to achieve renown in his homeland. He studied sharia and became qadi of Akusha's congregational mosque in 1890. The circumstances of Ali's assumption of the role are disputed; historian A. A. Isayev has said that Ali succeeded qadi Gadzhilaali after the latter retired while declaring the former as his successor. Another version has claimed that Ali took on the role due to Gadzhilaali's death. By this time, he had undertaken the hajj.

As an ʿālim Ali-Hajji had a reputation for honesty. Local legend in Akusha claims that he refused wealth from a Derbent merchant as a reward for ensuring that the properties of the merchant's family were distributed according to sharia. According to the legend, he refused to take a qotan, or type of pasture, from the merchant and handed over the reward to the local population. Ali-Hajji's son also claimed that he refused to permit a local chieftain to undertake the hajj upon discovering he had taken bribes.

Ali-Hajji was also critical of the government of the Russian Empire, expressing support for the 1913–1914 Dagestan movement. He was sentenced to three years' imprisonment for his criticism of the Russian government, promotion of Islam and condemnation of non-Muslims. Despite this, he partook in a 1914 ceremony greeting Emperor Nicholas II in Derbent as he travelled to observe the Caucasus campaign of World War I.

== Russian Revolution and Civil War ==
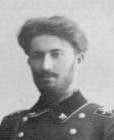
Mahach Dahadayev, A Bolshevik leader that became acquainted with Ali-Hajji and convinced him to support the Bolsheviks

As the Russian Revolution unfolded, Ali-Hajji began to wade into Dagestan's emerging political culture. In contrast to many Islamic religious leaders in Dagestan, who refused cooperation with the Bolsheviks, Ali-Hajji established a close relationship with them, though the date marking the beginning of their interactions is disputed. Takhu Abdullayeva, spouse of Bolshevik revolutionary Rasul Kaytbekov, claimed that Ali-Hajji met with Dagestani Bolshevik leaders Djelal ed-Din Korkmasov and Mahach Dahadayev in the village of Paraul on Mid-Sha'ban in June 1917. According to Abdullayeva, the meeting was organised by Kaytbekov and Mamma-Hajji, a murid of Ali-Hajji from the village of Nizhny Dzhengutay. The meeting was followed by a rally in which Ali-Hajji expressed support for Korkmasov and Dahadayev in undertaking pro-democratic reforms after the February Revolution, and called on all those present to support the two for the victory of sharia. Ali-Hajji's secretary, Suleiman-Hajji, has claimed that was in June 1918 when the socialists began to support him.

At a January 1918 meeting of Dagestan's aalimath and military officers, an election to the title of shaykh al-Islām was held. Ali-Hajji was one of the candidates, as well as Uzun-Hajji of Salta and Najmuddin of Gotzo. Ali-Hajji ultimately won the election and was appointed to the post after receiving support from the Dagestan Socialist Group, an alliance including Bolsheviks and various other leftists.

Dahadayev wrote a letter to Ali-Hajji in early 1918, expressing a moderate view towards Islam:

I am not among those who deny sharia and Islam. God forbid. Until now, words to the contrary have not come from my mouth, and after this they will not. We do not forbid people to follow the laws of sharia.

Ali-Hajji subsequently expressed his faith in the Bolsheviks to his followers, writing on 20 May 1918, "The Bolsheviks are not against us living according to sharia and promise to return the weapons they took away by mistake. If they were to encroach on Islam, I would be the first to call the entire people to war." Dahadayev again demonstrated a conciliatory stance after becoming chairman of the Dagestan Military Revolutionary Committee, promising that the committee would establish sharia courts. Alibek Ṭahaq̇adiqala, a Bolshevik leader, would admit in 1927 that the promises made to Ali-Hajji were lies, saying, "We had to lie more than once, just to tear the masses away from the influence of bourgeois ideology. It was necessary to reconcile the incompatible, the 20th century and sharia."

=== White Russian invasion and resistance ===
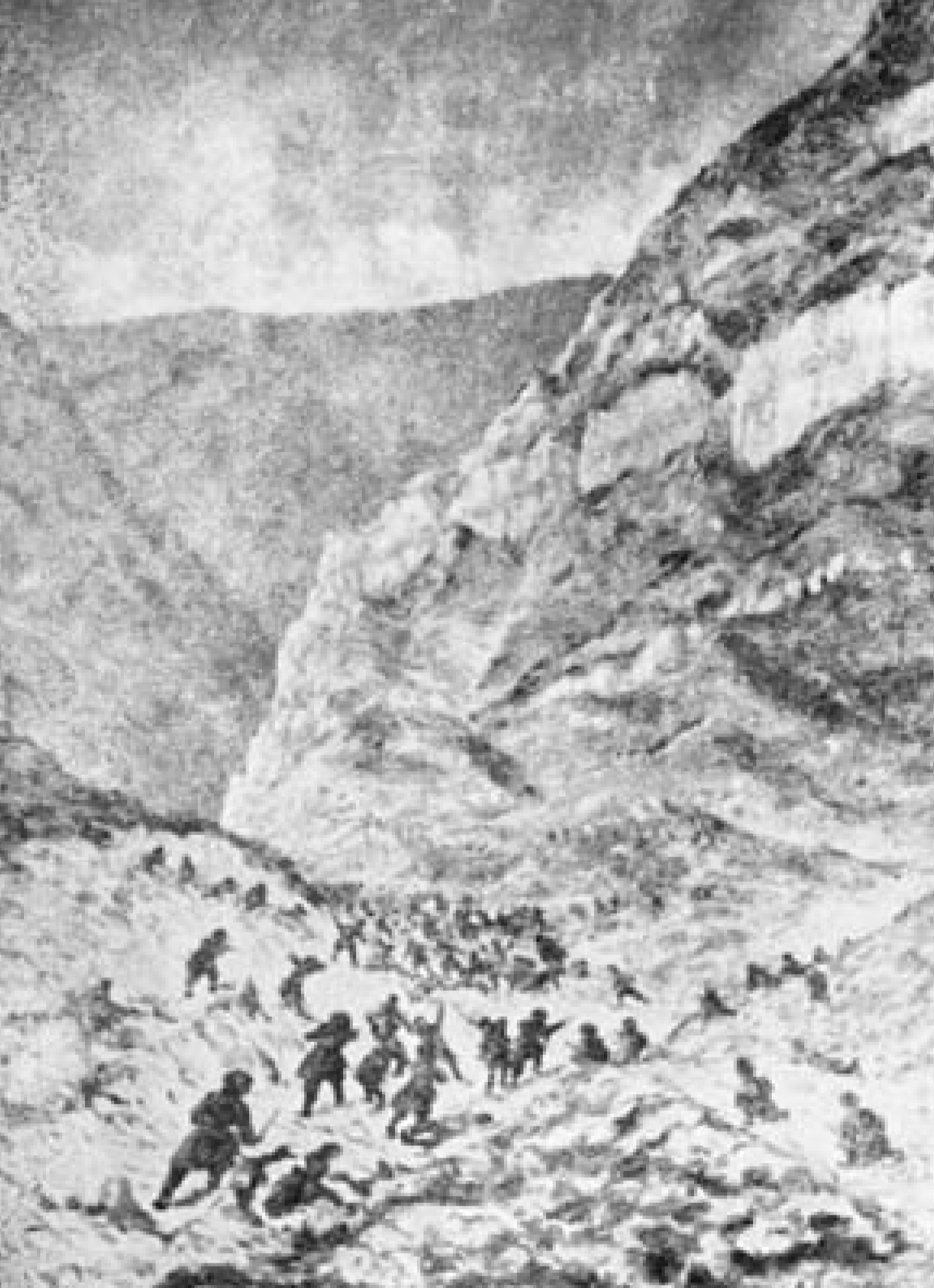
Ali-Hajji commanded anti-White Russian troops during the Dagestan uprising (1919–1920)

The Armed Forces of South Russia invaded Dagestan in May 1919, bringing an end to the Mountainous Republic of the Northern Caucasus. As the invasion was under way, Prime Minister Pshemakho Kotsev fled to the Dargin District, where he met Ali-Hajji. At Kotsev's urging, Ali-Hajji met with former rival Uzun-Hajji, and the two began plans for an insurgency against the White movement.

At first, the White-appointed Governor of Dagestan, Mikail Khalilov, attempted to bargain with Ali-Hajji, promising that he would be allowed to retain the title of shaykh al-Islām if he defected to the Whites. After he refused, Khalilov deprived him of his title and accused him of deviating from Islam. Ali-Hajji's forces were bolstered by a select few Bolsheviks who had chosen to stay behind and fight rather than fleeing to Baku, namely Korkmasov.

On 19 October 1919 the Security Council of the Northern Caucasus and Dagestan was established as a body to coordinate insurgent activities. Ali-Hajji was appointed the council's chairman. The council received support from the Dagestan Regional Committee of the Russian Communist Party (Bolshevik), which attempted to take it over. This was complicated, however, by generals of the Ottoman Empire such as Nuri Pasha and Kâzım Bey, who had come to the North Caucasus at the behest of Ali-Hajji and Uzun-Hajji to fight the Whites. The Ottoman officers, too, sought to subvert the Security Council in order to create a group of pro-Ottoman puppet states in the North Caucasus.

The Security Council received support from other Caucasus states, as well as the erstwhile Allies of World War I. The Bolsheviks ultimately succeeded in taking over the council, removing Ali-Hajji and replacing him with the communist Sultan-Said Kazbekov on 7 February 1920. The 11th Red Army entered the North Caucasus in late March 1920, and Korkmasov was placed in charge of a revolutionary committee governing all of Dagestan.

== Life in the Soviet Union ==
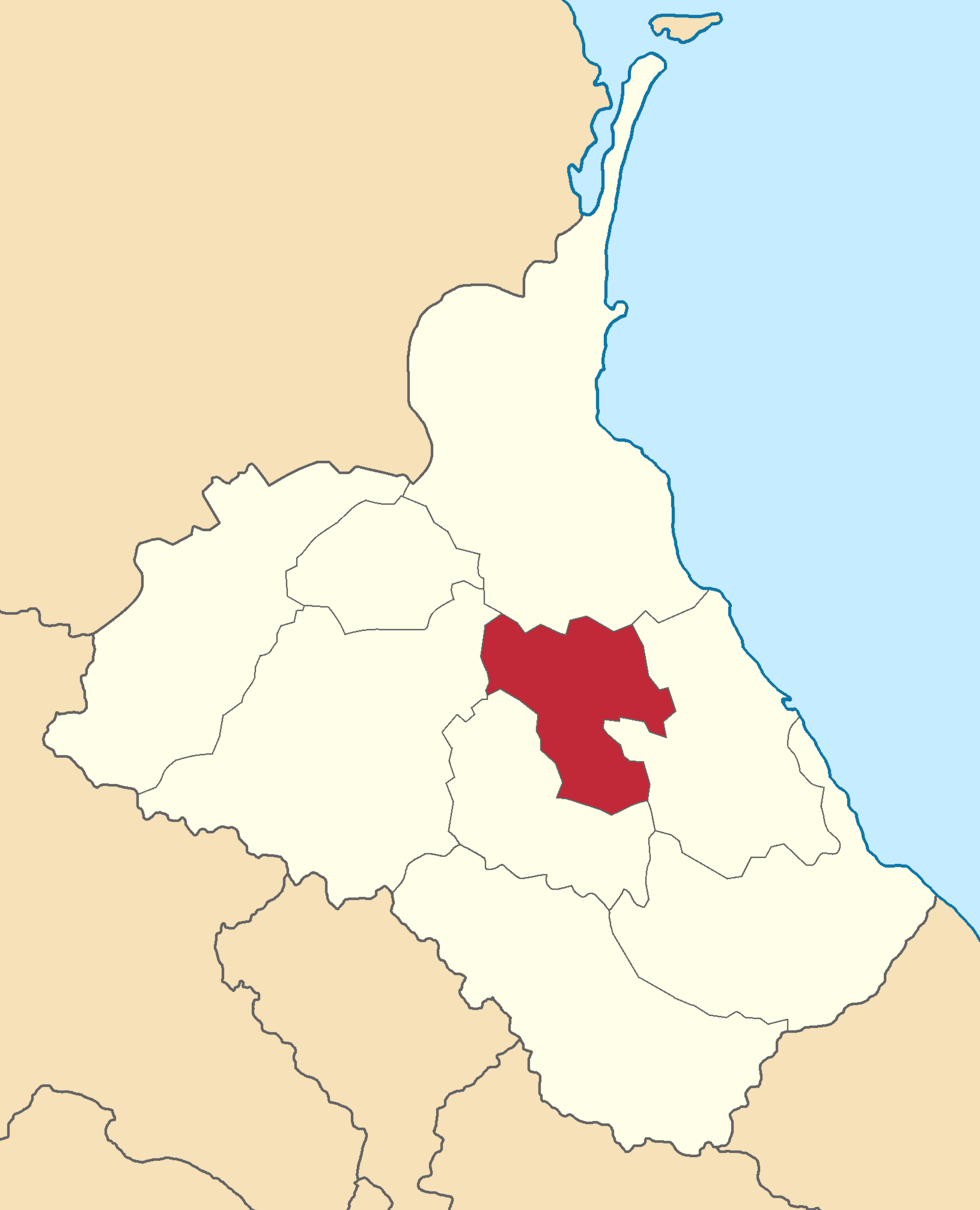
The Dargin District, the location of most of Ali-Hajji's post-Civil War activism against the Soviet government

Following his removal from power Ali-Hajji initially continued to support the Soviets. He condemned the Dagestan uprising, led by Najmuddin of Gotzo, as pitting Muslims against one another. In 1921, he joined Korkmasov as part of a delegation to visit Bolshevik leader Vladimir Lenin, by whom he was gifted a watch. Over time, however, Ali-Hajji's attitude towards the government would gradually change. The adoption of the Decree on Separation of Church and State and the abolition of sharia in the North Caucasus drove him into opposition. Magomed Abdullayev, a biographer of Ali-Hajji, also notes that after the end of the Civil War the Soviets had stopped the constant flow of food, rice, sugar, flour, textiles and money towards Ali-Hajji's family. As a result of the shipments of goods, Ali-Hajji's family was receiving 10,000 rubles, which Ali-Hajji used to travel with 500 murids to various locations in Dagestan, including Gubden, Kayakent, Madzhalis and Tsudakhar.

Ali-Hajji began to travel throughout Dagestan in protest of Soviet religious policy, followed by a growing number of supporters. Demonstrations against Soviet atheism also occurred in the cities of Makhachkala and Derbent. At one point, Aliyev arrived in Karabudakhkent with three phaetons and five horsemen, proclaiming "Do not join the party, and if someone asks for bread - do not give it to them and do not give it to soldiers." The incident led Ibragim Aliyev, people's commissar for justice in Dagestan, to send a telegram to the revolutionary committee. Najmuddin Samursky, chairman of the Central Executive Committee of the Dagestan Autonomous Soviet Socialist Republic, wrote a letter to Ali-Hajji in 1921 requesting that weapons in Akusha be handed over to the government. After Ali-Hajji refused, Samursky threatened him, saying "We advise you to be prudent and not to resist the Reds, who are so powerful and can destroy your villages."

Along with his murids, Ali-Hajji was also involved in organising an underground system of Islamic education. In a 15 October 1925 speech to the people of Akusha, he said "We Muslims do not need Soviet schools, but madrasa schools, in which our children should receive Arabic knowledge and knowledge of Sharia law. If Muslim children are allowed into Soviet schools, then in three years they will completely forget about God and faith." By early 1926, the number of state-run schools in the village of Gubden had decreased from five to one, with the number of students decreasing from 225 to 49. The religious school system in Gubden, on the other hand, continued to take in students. In protest of Soviet education policy, Ali-Hajji and the clergy of other villages around Akusha threw school desks into the Akusha river. The daughter of Akusha's party organisational secretary later recounted that Ali-Hajji's loyalists effectively governed the village in parallel to Soviet institutions, frequently protesting at places where the latter gathered.

In the period between 1925 and 1927, Ali-Hajji continued to travel around the Dargin District, giving speeches to large crowds of people as they visited him. He called on observers to disobey the communists, whom he described as infidels, and said that communists should not be buried as they would go directly to Hell. Ali-Hajji's daughter also gave similarly anti-communist speeches to women who gathered at the hamlet where she lived.

As repressions from the Soviet government against religious leaders increased, the Bolshevik leadership of Dagestan repeatedly sought to avoid having to arrest Ali-Hajji, as many Bolsheviks in Dagestan respected the sheikh for his leadership during the Civil War. Two Dagestani sheikhs exiled in Turkey, Muhammad Madani and Sharafuddin of Kikuni, requested that Ali-Hajji and his family flee Dagestan for Turkey. He visited the two, but refused to emigrate.

=== Repression and death ===
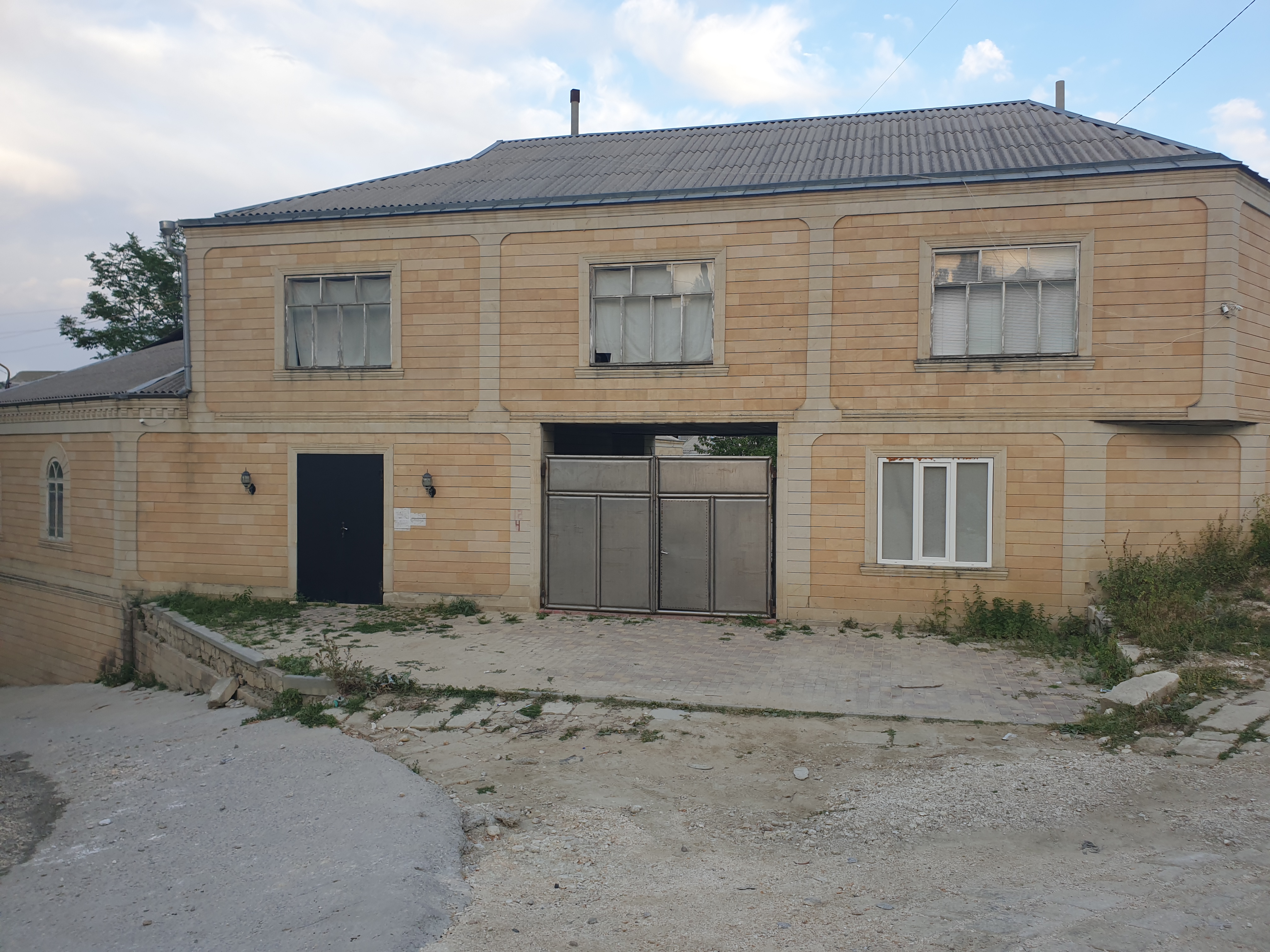
Ali-Hajji's home, burial site and ziyarat in Akusha

In December 1928 the Dagestan branch of the Joint State Political Directorate (OGPU) launched a criminal investigation against a group of people believed to be involved in counter-revolutionary activities. According to the OGPU, Ali-Hajji and his eldest son, Muhammad, were responsible for establishing a 66-person group opposed to the Soviet government. All but one of the alleged group's members (Ali-Hajji himself) were arrested; of the 65, several were executed by firing squad, with the remainder sent to Gulag or internal exile. Ali-Hajji's sons were sentenced to death, but their sentences were commutted by the Dagestan republican branch of the OGPU in recognition of their father's involvement in the Civil War.

Ali-Hajji was not arrested due to his age, as he was over 80 years old at the time, as well as his authority among Dargin Muslims. After the arrests, Ali-Hajji died on 8 April 1930. Along with all other members of the group, Ali-Hajji was rehabilitated in June 1989 after the Soviet government found there was insufficient proof that the group alleged by the OGPU had ever existed.

== Political views ==
While an expert on sharia and sources of Islamic law, Ali-Hajji was a moderate who expressed sympathies towards social justice, equality and socialism. He viewed communism positively, seeing it as responsible for uplifting the poor, but was opposed to the Soviet anti-religious campaigns. He was a pan-Caucasianist and pan-Islamist, seeking the creation of a single state among the Muslims of the North Caucasus.
