= 1956 Georgian demonstrations =

Protests and massacre in Soviet Georgia

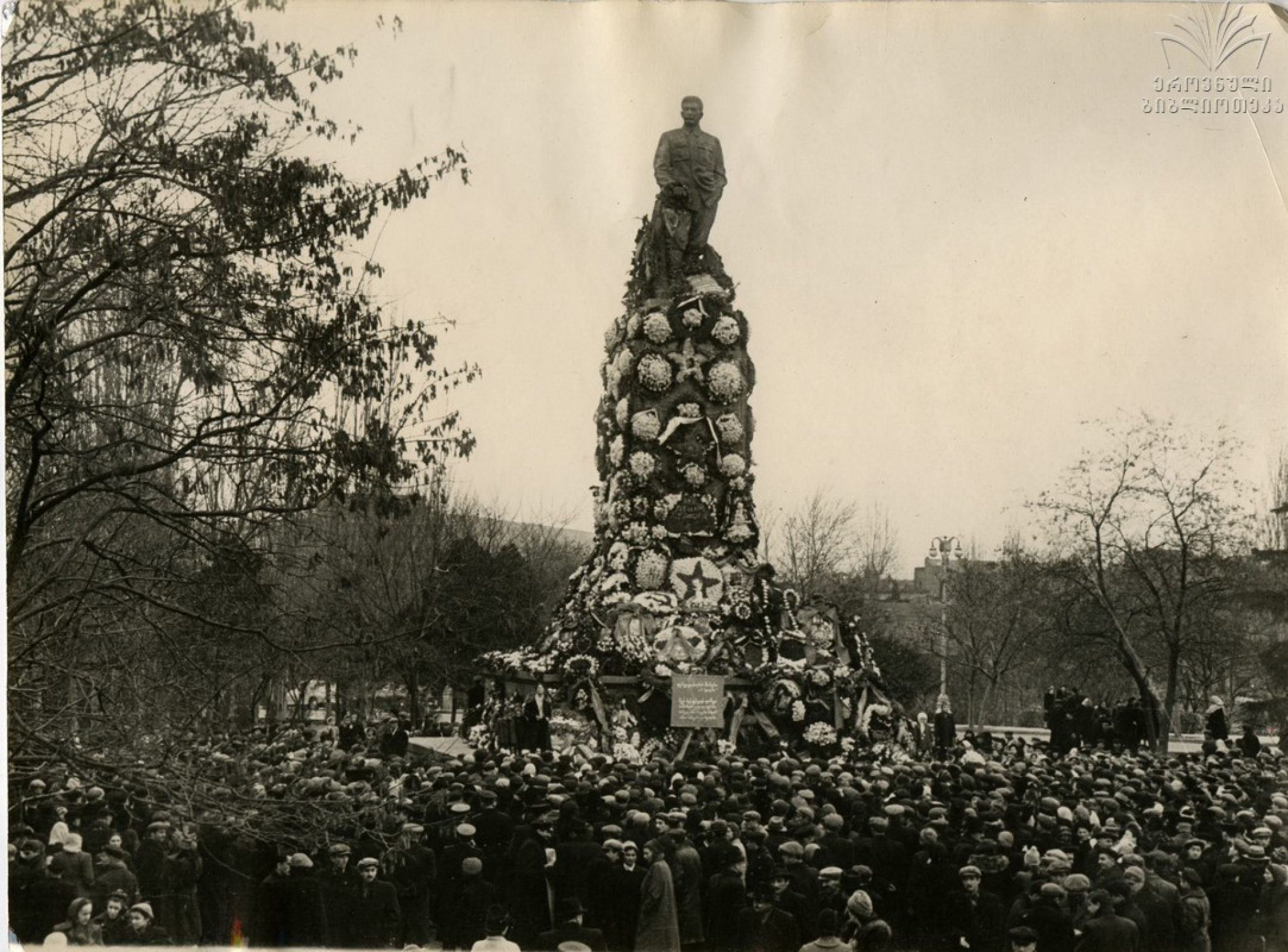
- Crowd gathered at the Stalin monument in Tbilisi during the demonstrations
- Date: 4–10 March 1956
- Location: Tbilisi, Georgian SSR, Soviet Union
- Caused by: Resistance to de-Stalinization
- Goals: Defence of Joseph Stalin's legacy and of Georgian national identity
- Methods: Protest march, picketing, rioting
- Result: Destabilization of the city and subsequent repression of the protests by Soviet military authorities

Parties
Soviet Union: Georgian SSR	(Soviet Union) Pro-Stalin demonstrators (Georgia (country)) Pro-independence underground students

Lead figures
(Soviet Union) Nikita Khrushchev (Georgian Soviet Socialist Republic) Vasil Mzhavanadze	

Casualties and losses
	22 killed; 55 wounded; 200+ arrested

The 1956 Georgian demonstrations (Georgian: 1956 წლის საპროტესტო გამოსვლები) were a series of protests against Nikita Khrushchev's de-Stalinization policy that took place in Tbilisi, capital of the Georgian SSR, Soviet Union, and other cities in the republic from 4 to 10 March 1956. The immediate trigger was the publication of Khrushchev's "Secret Speech", which criticized Joseph Stalin, the former Soviet leader born in Georgia. The demonstrations began as spontaneous gatherings to mark the third anniversary of Stalin's death but evolved into large-scale protests, primarily led by students, defending Stalin's legacy and expressing Georgian national pride.

Initial demands focused on retracting criticism of Stalin and acknowledging the anniversary of his death. However, as the protests grew and faced official opposition, demands became more radical, including calls for the removal of Soviet leaders like Khrushchev and Anastas Mikoyan, the rehabilitation of Stalin's associate Lavrentiy Beria, and even Georgian independence from the Soviet Union. Clashes occurred between protesters and authorities, culminating on the night of 9–10 March when Soviet Army units opened fire on demonstrators in central Tbilisi, resulting in dozens killed and injured.

The violent suppression shocked Georgian society and marked a turning point. While initially rooted in pro-Stalin sentiments intertwined with national pride, the events fostered a strong anti-Soviet and anti-Russian sentiment among many Georgians. The demonstrations are considered a key moment in the development of Georgian nationalism and catalysed the emergence of an organised dissident movement, including figures like Zviad Gamsakhurdia and Merab Kostava, who would later lead Georgia to independence in 1991. The events also exacerbated tensions between the Georgian majority and ethnic minorities within the republic, particularly the Abkhaz.

== Background ==
=== Georgia in the Stalin period ===
Post-war Georgia held a unique position within the Soviet Union, largely due to Joseph Stalin's Georgian origins. Although Stalin rarely emphasized his ethnicity publicly, he maintained a keen interest in Georgian affairs, knew many officials personally, and regularly vacationed at his Black Sea dachas, where he met with republican leaders, allowing them informal access. This proximity gave Georgian politicians political access disproportionate to the republic's size or economic weight. Lavrentiy Beria, another Georgian, rose to become Stalin's NKVD chief in 1938 and remained a key figure in the central leadership until Stalin's death. Beria acted as an informal patron for Georgia, cultivating a vast patronage network (sheftsvo) that extended deep into the republican apparatus. This patronage provided stability for leaders like Kandid Charkviani, First Secretary of the Georgian Communist Party from 1938 to 1952, but also fostered ambition and sometimes heavy-handed policies within the republic.

Georgia, which was annexed by the Russian Empire in a piecemeal fashion throughout the 19th century, developed a strong nationalist movement in the 1860s under the leadership of intellectuals such as Ilia Chavchavadze. The Russian imperial authorities attempted to suppress the national movement but encountered Georgian resistance, which culminated in the declaration of the First Georgian Republic following the collapse of the Russian Empire. The republic, the first independent Georgian state in the modern era, lasted only from 1918 to 1921, when it was annexed by the Soviet Union. The Soviet authorities developed an official narrative that portrayed the 1921 Soviet invasion not as a foreign occupation and annexation, but as a class conflict. Under this narrative, Georgia's Menshevik leadership from 1918 to 1921 was depicted as betraying the interests of the working class and peasantry and acting as an accomplice of imperialism. The Soviet government found it particularly difficult to entrench this narrative following its suppression of local Georgian Bolshevik leaders through the 1922 Georgian Affair and the suppression of the 1924 Georgian uprising. Partly in response to these challenges, but also in the context of the korenizatsiya policy, Soviet Georgian leaders such as Sergo Ordzhonikidze and Lavrentiy Beria attempted to build bridges with the Georgian nationalist movement by establishing contacts with nationalist intellectuals such as Pavle Ingorokva and Konstantine Gamsakhurdia. The Soviet promotion of Georgian culture, alongside efforts to redirect Georgian nationalism away from political activity and towards cultural pursuits—including language, education, the preservation of historic monuments, literature, film, and sports—contributed to the development of a strong Soviet Georgian national identity. Stalin, as the Soviet Union's supreme leader and a Georgian by birth, became one of its central symbols. This helped ensure the stability of Soviet rule, although it was also marked by Stalinist repressions.

However, the relative stability was punctuated by internal power struggles and Moscow's interventions. The "Mingrelian Affair" of 1951–1953, initiated by Stalin, targeted Beria's client network, particularly officials of Mingrelian origin (Beria was himself Mingrelian). This purge saw the removal of Charkviani and the rise of Akaki Mgeladze, an official favoured by Stalin. The affair involved arrests, fabricated charges of espionage and nationalism, and deportations of over 11,000 people deemed "enemy elements" from Georgia. This period of turmoil weakened Beria's position and left the Georgian leadership in a state of flux.

=== Death of Stalin and de-Stalinization ===
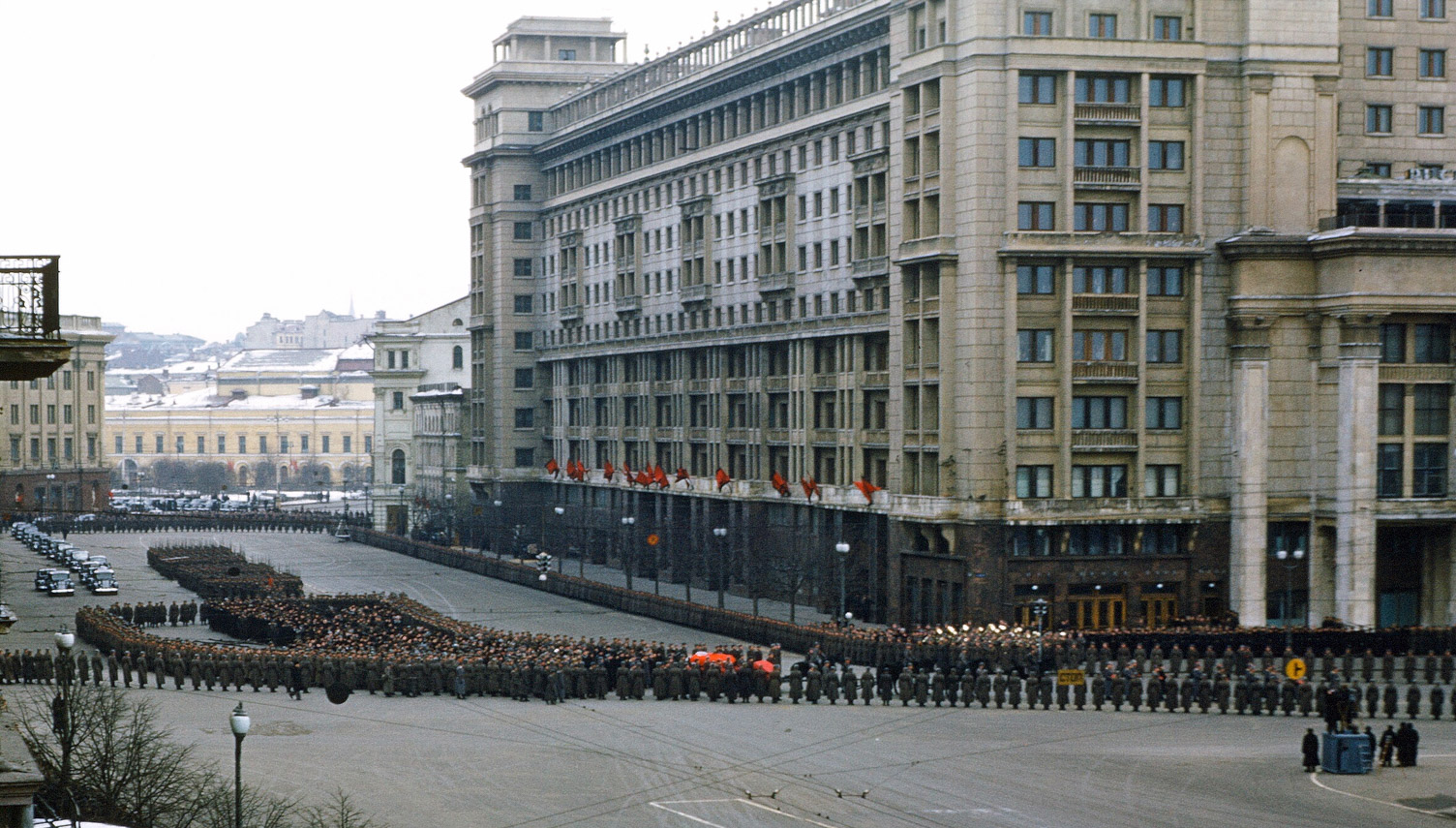
Stalin's funeral in Moscow, March 1953. His death led to power struggles and the eventual policy of de-Stalinization.

Joseph Stalin died on 5 March 1953. His death triggered a power struggle in Moscow, culminating in the arrest and execution of Lavrentiy Beria in June 1953. Beria's downfall led to another purge of his associates in Georgia. In September 1953, Vasil Mzhavanadze, an ethnic Georgian who had spent his career in Ukraine under Nikita Khrushchev and had no prior leadership experience in Georgia, was appointed First Secretary of the Georgian Communist Party. This appointment of an "outsider" signalled Moscow's intention to exert tighter control over the republic, bypassing traditional patronage networks.

Immediately after Joseph Stalin's death, tens of thousands of people flocked to Stalin's monuments in Tbilisi and other cities across the Soviet republics to pay their respects to the deceased leader. The same scenes were repeated on the anniversaries of his death in 1954 and 1955. However, the new Soviet authorities carefully began to express their unfavourable views of Stalin. Initially, newspapers began publishing criticism of him, followed by officials voicing their criticism at official meetings, something the Soviet public was not accustomed to.

The policy of de-Stalinization reached its apex at the Twentieth Party Congress of the CPSU in February 1956. In a closed session on 25 February, Khrushchev delivered his famous "Secret Speech", formally titled "On the Cult of Personality and Its Consequences". He denounced Stalin for creating a personality cult, detailed his abuses of power, including the Great Terror and deportations, questioned his military leadership during World War II, and specifically criticized the fabrication of the Mingrelian Affair in Georgia. Khrushchev explicitly mocked the Georgian tendency to refer to Stalin as "the great son of the Georgian nation". This passage of his speech particularly offended Georgians, as did Khrushchev's denunciation of "local bourgeois nationalism," which, according to him, had grown in Georgia under Stalin's rule.

The speech, while intended for internal Party discussion, quickly became known through rumour. Its contents, particularly the direct criticism of Stalin and the perceived slights against Georgia, caused shock and anxiety among Georgians. This coincided with an official decision, based on the speech's line, to prohibit the usual public commemoration of the anniversary of Stalin's death on 5 March. In previous years (1954 and 1955), the date had been marked by spontaneous gatherings, particularly by students, involving laying wreaths at Stalin monuments, reciting poetry, and singing songs – events which intertwined the veneration of Stalin with expressions of Georgian national pride.

=== Stalin's cult in Georgia ===
The veneration of Stalin had particularly deep roots in Georgia. Beyond the standard Soviet cult of personality propagated across the USSR, Stalin's Georgian origins gave him a special status in his homeland. For many Georgians, he was "Ioseb Jughashvili, a local boy from Gori who became the head of the new Soviet superpower". This connection fostered a sense of national pride and perceived privilege. Even among families who had suffered during the repressions of the 1930s, Stalin's image was often rehabilitated by the Soviet victory in World War II and his status as the supreme leader.

The cult involved symbolic exchanges; gifts like flowers and wreaths given to Stalin's monuments functioned as tokens of gratitude and obligation, reinforcing a connection between the leader and the people. Stalin's name was omnipresent in Georgia, attached to streets, institutions, prizes, and even the constitution. While the official Soviet cult presented Stalin primarily as a Soviet figure, deliberately downplaying his Georgianness, popular interpretation in Georgia fused the Soviet leader cult with national sentiment, creating a "Stalinist Georgian nationalism". Khrushchev's denunciation thus struck not only at the image of the Soviet leader but also at a potent symbol of Georgian national identity and pride.

== Protests and crackdown ==
=== Initial protests (4–8 March) ===
Locations of protests within Georgia

Despite the official prohibition, spontaneous gatherings to commemorate the third anniversary of Stalin's death began in Tbilisi on 4 March 1956 near the large monument to Stalin on the bank of the Mtkvari River. These early gatherings were largely composed of students and were initially peaceful, involving laying wreaths, reciting poems, and singing songs, similar to the commemorations of the previous two years. An honor guard, mainly consisting of students, was formed at the statue. On 5 March, the anniversary itself, the crowd grew significantly, reaching an estimated 10,000 people by evening. Similar, though smaller, gatherings occurred in other cities like Gori, Kutaisi, Rustavi, Sukhumi, and Batumi.

News and rumours about Khrushchev's "Secret Speech" and the criticism of Stalin began to circulate more widely around 5–6 March, coinciding with the formal reading of an abridged version to Party officials in Tbilisi. This information fueled the protests, transforming them from memorial gatherings into demonstrations defending Stalin's name and expressing national resentment. Student demonstrators were joined by workers, members of the intelligentsia, and even some Party and Komsomol members. People arrived from the regions to join the Tbilisi protests.

The protesters' motivations were complex. For many, the primary drive was outrage at the perceived insult to Stalin and, by extension, to Georgian national pride. Even children of parents repressed under Stalin participated, viewing the criticism as an attack on Georgia itself. Others were confused by the sudden reversal of the Party line regarding Stalin. While initially spontaneous, some level of organization emerged, with activists coordinating the collection of money for wreaths and attempting to maintain discipline. Photography was generally prohibited by the demonstrators, likely out of fear of KGB surveillance.

The Georgian leadership, headed by First Secretary Vasil Mzhavanadze, was initially caught off guard and struggled to respond. Local Party and Komsomol organizations were instructed to conduct explanatory work and prevent disruptions, but these efforts largely failed. On 7 March, many students skipped classes to join the demonstrations, which grew larger and spread to Rustaveli Avenue, the city's main thoroughfare. Demands began to emerge: restoring Stalin's name in the press and the Georgian SSR anthem, showing films about Stalin, ascertaining the whereabouts of Stalin's son Vasily, and declaring 9 March a public holiday and day of mourning.

=== Escalation and shifting demands (8–9 March) ===
The situation escalated significantly on 8 March. The presence of Marshal Zhu De, a high-ranking Chinese leader visiting Tbilisi at the time, became an unexpected focal point. Seeking external validation or perhaps intervention, thousands of protesters marched towards the government residence in Krtsanisi where Zhu De was staying. They broke through military cordons – the soldiers apparently lacking orders to use force initially – and confronted Georgian officials, including Party Secretary Giorgadze. After negotiations, a delegation of protesters was allowed to meet Mzhavanadze and present their demands. Mzhavanadze agreed to some concessions, such as publishing portraits of Stalin and allowing official memorial meetings on 9 March, likely hoping to regain control.

However, the protesters' demands continued to grow and radicalize. Alongside calls to honour Stalin, nationalist and anti-Soviet sentiments became more pronounced. Slogans denouncing "Russian chauvinism" appeared. Critically, demands shifted towards direct political challenges: the removal of Khrushchev and Anastas Mikoyan (who was particularly reviled, partly due to his Armenian ethnicity and his role in criticising Stalin), the rehabilitation of the executed Beria and the imprisoned former Azerbaijani leader Mir Jafar Bagirov (Beria's ally), and even calls for Georgian independence. Anonymous leaflets circulated, some containing radical demands attributed to supposed "ruling centres", though evidence suggests the protests remained largely uncoordinated at the highest level. One particularly radical set of demands, read out by Ruben Kipiani, called for a new Union government, the trial of Khrushchev and Nikolai Bulganin, and the appointment of Mgeladze and Vasily Stalin to high positions.

=== Crackdown (night of 9–10 March) ===
On 9 March, the authorities attempted to manage the situation by holding official memorial ceremonies. Mzhavanadze addressed the crowd at the Stalin monument, announcing concessions. However, after the official event concluded around 2 pm, many protesters refused to disperse. The mood remained tense, with anti-government speeches continuing.

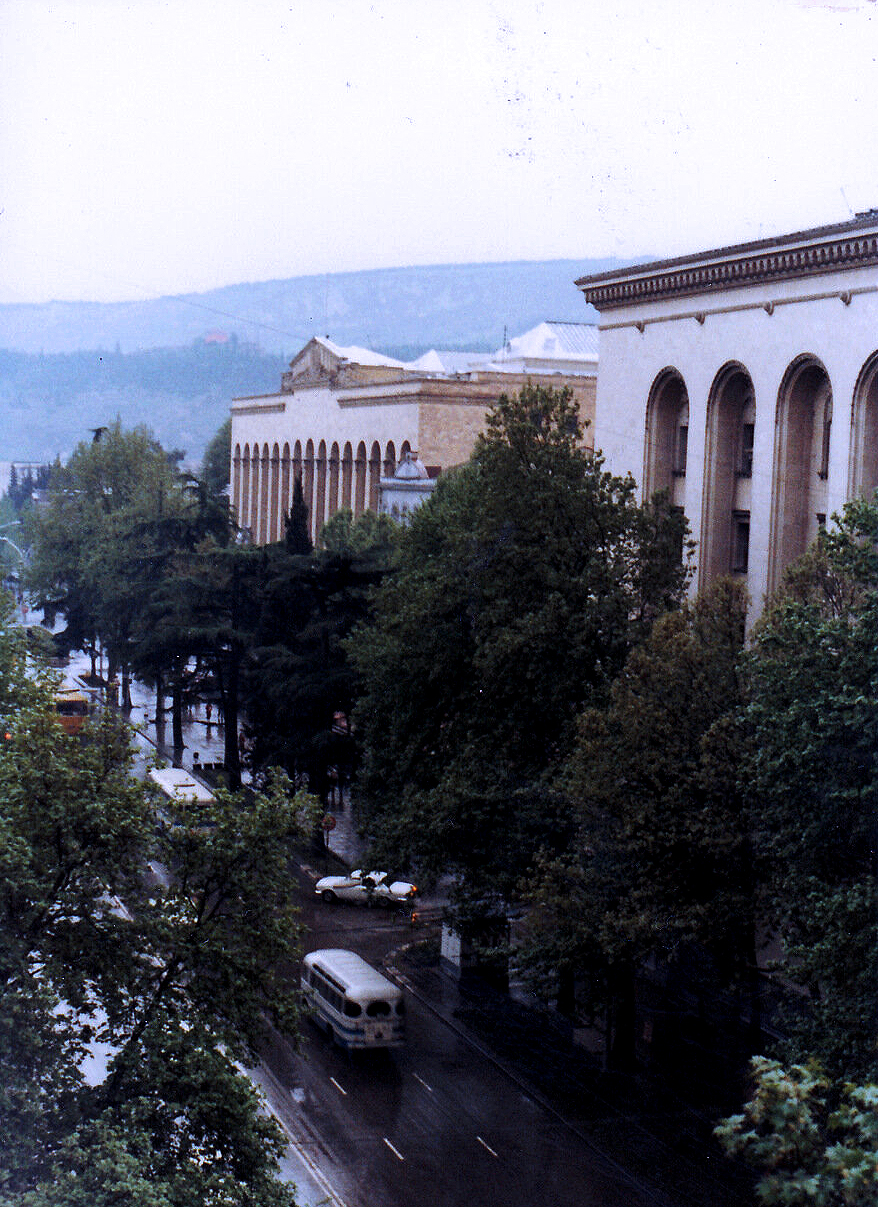
The Ministry of Communications building (right) on Rustaveli Avenue, the site of the massacre, in 1979

Late in the evening, around 11 pm, a delegation went to the Ministry of Communications (Dom Sviazi) on Rustaveli Avenue demanding that their protests be broadcast republic-wide and appeals sent to other Soviet cities. When rumour spread that the delegates had been arrested, a large crowd converged on the building, which was now guarded by Soviet Army soldiers. A confrontation ensued as protesters attempted to storm the building. After warning shots failed to deter the crowd, soldiers opened fire directly into the demonstrators. Eyewitness accounts describe numerous people being shot, particularly in the head, and chaos ensuing.

Despite the shooting at the Communications Ministry, protests continued elsewhere, particularly near the Stalin monument. Around midnight, Soviet Army tanks were deployed onto Rustaveli Avenue and towards the monument. Protesters attempted to block the tanks, with some climbing onto them or lying down in their path. The final dispersal occurred in the early hours of 10 March at the Stalin monument itself. Soldiers surrounded the remaining crowd, using rifle butts and bayonets, and fired again. Some panicked protesters jumped into the Mtkvari river to escape.

Official contemporary reports, like an initial telegram from Georgian KGB head Aleksi Inauri to Moscow, drastically under-reported the casualties. Early reports suggested over 100 people had been killed, with later investigations by the Georgian authorities established that at least 21 people were killed and 55 wounded, mostly students and young people. Some sources suggest the number of wounded may have been higher, as many likely avoided seeking official medical help for fear of persecution. Over 200 people were arrested.

== Motivations and discourse ==
The motivations of the demonstrators evolved during the week of protests. Initially, the driving force was the defense of Joseph Stalin's memory and Georgian national pride, reacting against Khrushchev's perceived denigration. This aligns with the deep integration of Stalin's image, as a Georgian who rose to lead the superpower, into the national consciousness. The protests were fueled by powerful emotions: pride in Stalin as a national figure, insult at his denunciation, and confusion over the sudden shift in the Party line.

Many participants, particularly the youth raised entirely under Stalinism, appeared to act within the framework of Soviet discourse, initially seeing Khrushchev's policy, not the Soviet system itself, as the aberration. They used the established language and symbols of Stalinist public life – portraits, banners, slogans praising Vladimir Lenin and Stalin – to express their dissent against the new policy. Their demands for adherence to what they perceived as correct Soviet (i.e., Stalinist) norms, and their apparent shock at the violent state response, suggest they initially believed they were acting legitimately.

However, as the protests met resistance and escalated, the demands broadened to include direct challenges to the current Soviet leadership (Khrushchev, Mikoyan) and, for some, calls for systemic change or independence. This shift indicates a rapid radicalization process, moving from defending a particular interpretation of the Soviet past to questioning the present Soviet order. The perception of the events as a national insult, combined with the violent state response, fused national sentiment with anti-government and, increasingly, anti-Soviet feeling.

== Response of authorities ==
=== Georgian leadership ===
The republican leadership under Vasil Mzhavanadze initially tried to contain the protests through explanations and limited concessions. They permitted official memorial events on 9 March and Mzhavanadze personally addressed the crowds. However, they underestimated the depth of feeling and failed to prevent the escalation. Faced with growing unrest and radical demands on 8–9 March, the Georgian leadership appears to have requested or acquiesced to the intervention of the Soviet Army. In subsequent reports to Moscow, Mzhavanadze blamed the events on "nationalistic elements", the legacy of Beria, provocateurs, and failures in ideological work, particularly by the Komsomol, while also acknowledging the role of national feelings combined with the Stalin cult.

The Georgian Komsomol (Young Communist League) organization was heavily criticized for its failure to control the youth, who formed the core of the demonstrations. Komsomol leaders acknowledged failures in ideological education and admitted losing authority among students. In their internal discussions and reports, they often shifted blame, citing the pervasive "formalism" inherited from the Beria era (implying a lack of genuine connection with youth), the inherent difficulties in countering the deeply ingrained Stalin cult, and the influence of "parasites", "hooligans", and "provocateurs" misleading the otherwise loyal youth. Some Komsomol officials expressed sympathy for the students' initial motivations while condemning the later "anti-Soviet" turn.

=== Soviet leadership ===
The central authorities in Moscow, primarily informed through KGB channels and reports from the Georgian leadership, closely monitored the situation. Initial reports highlighted the provocative nature of the protests and the defense of Stalin. The decision to use military force on the night of 9–10 March indicates Moscow's ultimate determination to suppress the challenge to the de-Stalinization policy and maintain control. In the immediate aftermath, the Kremlin accepted the Georgian leadership's narrative blaming provocateurs and shortcomings in local ideological work, issuing decrees criticising the Georgian Party and Komsomol but avoiding wider purges. The response appeared relatively conciliatory compared to crackdowns elsewhere, perhaps reflecting a calculation that confronting Georgian nationalism directly was riskier than containing it.

== Aftermath and consequences ==
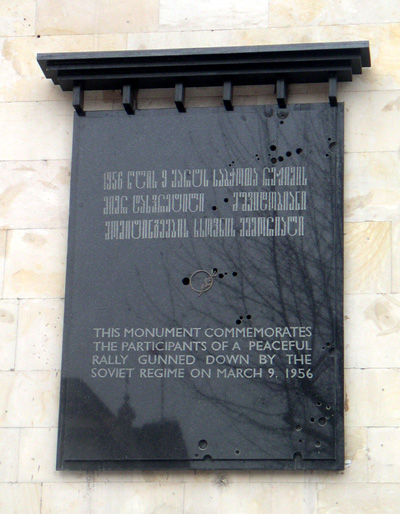
Plaque commemorating the 9 March massacre on Rustaveli Avenue in Tbilisi in English and Georgian

The immediate aftermath of the crackdown saw a significant increase in anti-Russian and anti-Soviet sentiment in Georgia. Numerous reports detailed hostility towards Russians, including assaults and calls for expulsion. The authorities attempted to quell this mood by prohibiting gatherings and tightly controlling information about the casualties, leading to exaggerated rumours, including claims that up to 800 had been killed. While many of those arrested during the protests were eventually released or given suspended sentences, the experience of the demonstrations and their violent suppression had a profound radicalizing effect, particularly on the youth.

The March 1956 events are widely seen as the origin point for the modern Georgian national-independence movement. Several key figures of the later dissident movement, including Zviad Gamsakhurdia (Georgia's future first president) and Merab Kostava, were participants or directly influenced by the events. They were arrested in December 1956 for distributing anti-Soviet leaflets that explicitly linked the March crackdown with calls for Georgian independence and solidarity with the Hungarian Uprising. This marked a clear shift from the initial pro-Stalin focus of the March demonstrations to an overtly anti-Soviet nationalist platform.

The events also significantly impacted inter-ethnic relations within Georgia. The perceived assertion of Georgian nationalism during the protests, followed by Moscow's interventions that sometimes favoured minorities (particularly in Abkhazia and South Ossetia), exacerbated existing tensions. The 1956 protests contributed to the development and public emergence of Abkhaz nationalism, as Abkhaz intellectuals and officials seized the opportunity presented by de-Stalinization and the crackdown on the protests to press their demands. They argued that ethnic Abkhaz were being marginalized by what they described as Georgianization policies in Abkhazia, a claim supported by the CPSU Central Committee as part of its efforts to discredit Lavrentiy Beria and other Soviet Georgian leaders. Georgians, however, argued that the Kremlin fomented ethnic unrest in Abkhazia whenever disturbances occurred in Tbilisi, a pattern that was repeated during the 1978 Georgian demonstrations. Protests occurred in Abkhazia in 1957, 1967, and 1978, often demanding secession from Georgia and incorporation into the Russian SFSR, framing their campaign partly as a reaction against rekindled Georgian nationalism. This established a pattern of competing nationalisms and grievances that would intensify in the later Soviet period.

In the longer term, the March 1956 events became enshrined in collective memory as a symbol of national resistance against Soviet power, even though the initial motivations were complex and tied to the defense of Stalin. The suppression demonstrated the limits of Moscow's tolerance for dissent, particularly when linked with nationalism, and contributed to a lasting distrust of the central authorities among Georgians. The legacy of 1956 continued to shape Georgian political culture, fostering a strong nationalist sentiment focused on territorial integrity and linguistic privilege, which played a central role in the mass demonstrations and independence movement of the late 1980s.

== See also ==
- History of Georgia (country)
- History of the Soviet Union (1953–1964)
- Novocherkassk massacre in 1962
- April 9 tragedy in 1989
