= Russification of Georgia =

The Russification of Georgia includes a system of measures, actions and legislations undertaken by the Russian Empire, later Soviet Union and currently Russian-occupied Abkhazia, aimed at linguistical and cultural assimilation of Georgians to eredicate their identity, terminate Georgia's cultural uniqueness and fully integrate it into Russia.

== Imperial Russification policy in Georgia ==
Russian conquest of the South Caucasus began in the late 18th century and included various territorial acquisitions from Qajar Iran and the Ottoman Empire. Various Georgian kingdoms and principalities, threatened by Iran and the Ottoman Empire, voluntarily placed themselves under the protection of the Russian Empire. Georgian and Armenian attitudes towards the Russian Empire contrasted with the Muslim struggle against Russian expansion, as broad sections of the Georgian and Armenian populations sought ties with Russia to liberate themselves from Islamic rule. However, they also expected Russia to grant them political and cultural autonomy, which was not respected. Russia instead proceeded to outright annex Georgia while abolishing its local dynasties, suppressing its dynastic autonomy and violating the bilateral treaties. The eastern Georgian king Erekle II placed his kingdom under Russian protection through the Treaty of Georgievsk in 1783. However, in September 1801, the eastern Georgian kingdom was unilaterally and directly annexed by Russian Empire, which was rationalized by the need to defend Russia's new subjects against domestic discord and external enemies, but actually ran contrary to previous agreements between Kartli-Kakheti (Eastern Georgia) and Russia. The western Georgian principalities, which were part of the Ottoman Empire, placed themselves under Russian protection from 1803 to 1811 and were able to preserve their autonomy under the native princely families for several decades, with the exception of the Kingdom of Imereti.

In 1811, the centuries-old autocephaly of the Georgian Orthodox Church was abolished, and it was forcibly integrated into the Russian Orthodox Church. In 1817, it was placed under an ethnic Russian exarch. The liturgy of the Georgian Church was gradually brought into line with the Church Slavonic Russian rite. The Georgian language was excluded from schooling and replaced by the Russian-language school system. This contrasted with the policy towards the Muslims of Transcaucasia and the Armenian Church, whose autonomy was recognized in 1836 and which was initially viewed as an ally in the campaigns of expansion against the Ottoman Empire. The policy towards Georgia resembled that towards the Romanians in Bessarabia, who were subjected to early assimilatory measures because they were Orthodox Christians and were therefore considered closer to Russians in religious and sociocultural terms.

Under Nicholas I, the Transcaucasus was regarded as a colony, while the peoples of Transcaucasia were viewed as "uncivilized Asiatics", which was followed by repressive policies aimed at fully integrating Transcaucasia into Russia. In 1833, the Russian State Council identified its goal as linking Transcaucasia to Russia "as one body, and its population be brought to speak, think, and feel Russian". The repressive policies led to numerous Georgian uprisings in 1812, 1820, 1832, and 1841, as well as Muslim uprisings in the 1830s. By the middle of the 19th century, the system of far-reaching local autonomies under native vassals was eventually replaced by the Russian gubernia (province) system. The provinces of Tiflis and Kutais were created and headed by non-native civil servants appointed by St. Petersburg, although local anomalies persisted in the judicial and local administration.

The ongoing resistance in both the South and North Caucasus, as well as the failure of forced integration and the absence of economic profit from the colony, led to a shift towards a more pragmatic and flexible policy under Mikhail Vorontsov, the viceroy of the Caucasus from 1845 to 1855, who sought cooperation with the non-Russian elites. Vorontsov implemented reforms aimed at fully integrating the Georgian nobility into the regional administration, army, and bureaucracy, and introduced an estate-based organization of the nobility. The reforms aimed to transform the rebellious noble layer of society into a loyal and uniform official service nobility, while the peasants lost their traditional rights.

In the 1860s and 1870s, there was again an increase in Russification efforts in Transcaucasia due to the more systematic Russification and standardization program adopted by the Russian Empire across the country. Judicial and municipal reforms were introduced, and the office of the viceroy was abolished in 1883. While there was a certain revival of the Georgian language in the middle of the century, in the 1870s and especially the 1880s, Georgian was systematically excluded from schools. In 1872, the theological seminary in Tiflis replaced Georgian with Russian as the language of instruction. In 1882, the use of the term "Georgia" in the print press was forbidden. In 1886, the director of the Tiflis Theological Seminary, Reverend Chudetsky, who opposed the introduction of Georgian and called it a "language for dogs", was murdered by Ilia Laghiashvili, one of his expelled students.

The policy of Russification led to strong opposition from the Georgian national movement, which championed the Georgian language, literature, and culture, and successfully opposed the repressive Russian policy, which refused to recognize the Orthodox Georgians, with their ancient high culture and written language, as the equals of the Russians. After Russia concluded that the Russification of Georgia had failed, it switched to another tactic—attempting to deny the existence of a distinct Georgian nation. In the 1897 census, 11 ethnic groups were separated from Georgians by the Russian authorities. A similar policy of dividing homogeneous nations was adopted in the North Caucasus after its rebellions, notably towards the Circassians. These policies promoted distinct identities among minority groups in Georgia: schools were opened in Mingrelian and Svan languages. The teaching of the Russian language to Abkhazians led to the replacement of Georgian by Russian as their second language. This process continued in the Soviet Union, which treated Russian as the "language of inter-ethnic communication", and led to the further alienation of Abkhazians from Georgians, despite their common historical heritage and the relatively few historical problems between them. The Russian Empire created alphabets and elementary textbooks for the Mingrelian, Abkhaz, and Svan languages. The goal of this policy was to obviate the use of Georgian by these groups, leading them to replace Georgian with Russian as a vehicle of high culture, as well as to discourage the use of the Georgian script for everyday literacy. Georgian writers, by contrast, had attached special significance to Georgian as the common language of scholarship, culture, religion, law, and inter-ethnic communication in Georgia since the time of Pharnavaz I. Russian policies devalued the Georgian language in the second half of the 19th century, as knowledge of Russian was required to find a job in the administration. By the late 1890s, the Caucasus was ruled directly by Russian generals, and Georgians were denied official positions.

== Soviet Union ==
In the Soviet Union, the Georgian language was granted official status in the 1921 and 1937 constitutions of the Georgian Soviet Socialist Republic. However, the 1960s saw a push in the USSR towards linguistic Russification, which was rationalized by a theory of the gradual elimination of ethnic differences in the USSR and the emergence of a new, unitary "Soviet nationality". The Russification attempts were met with resistance in Ukraine, the Baltics, and the Caucasus. Russian became the language of instruction for various courses at Tbilisi State University, which was criticized by Georgian writers at the Georgian Writers' Union, an official organization. There were bombings in Georgia in 1975 and 1976, perpetrated by Vladimir Zhvania. According to dissident sources, he was motivated by opposition to the Russification drive. The discontent ultimately culminated in mass protests in 1978 against the Russification policy, which aimed to replace Georgian with Russian as the official language of the Georgian Soviet Socialist Republic, as part of the adoption of the "Brezhnev" constitution to replace the "Stalin" constitution. Soviet Georgian leader Eduard Shevardnadze sided with the protesters, and the popular demonstrations forced the Soviet authorities to retreat from their planned constitutional changes.

== Russification of Georgains in Russian-occupied Abkhazia ==
Following the collapse of the Soviet Union, the War in Abkhazia saw Georgia lose control of the region of Abkhazia to Russian-backed separatist forces. Despite the ethnic cleansing of Georgians, the Georgian population continued to constitute a majority in southern Gali District of Abkhazia. In 1994, Russian was imposed as the official language of Abkhazia alongside the poorly known Abkhaz language. Due to a lack of teachers in Russian, a transitional plan was announced in 2015, and education in Russian became mandatory in all Gali schools in 2021, while the use of the Georgian language was banned. Before the war, Georgian was the language of instruction in 52 of the 58 schools operating in Gali District.

== See also ==
- Russification of Finland
- Russification of Ukraine
- Russification of Belarus
- Lithuanian press ban
- De-Tatarization of Crimea
- Dagestan movement
- Internationalism or Russification?
- Sovietization
- Slavicisation of foreign names

== Sources ==
- Kappeler, Andreas (2013). The Russian Empire: A Multi-ethnic History. Routledge. ISBN 9780582234154.
- Cornell, Svante E. (2001). Small Nations and Great Powers: A Study of Ethnopolitical Conflict in the Caucasus. Routledge. ISBN 0-7007-1162-7.
- Smith, Graham (1998). Nation-building in the Post-Soviet Borderlands. Cambridge University Press. ISBN 9780521599689.
- Bibilashvili, Mariam (2022). Towards the "Normal" State: Georgian Foreign Policy Between Russia and the West. Springer Nature Singapore. ISBN 9789811963339.
