= North Caucasian Emirate =

Short lived emirate in modern-day Russia

North Caucasian Emirate Къилбаседа Кавказан Имарат Q̇ilbaseda-Kavkazan Imarat
- 1919–1920
- Flag Coat of arms

- The Emirate in 1919 Location in green
- Capital: Vedeno
- Common languages: Chechen · Dagestani languages
- Government: Islamic emirate
- Emir
  - 1919–1920: Uzun-Hajji
- Historical era: Russian Civil War
  - Established: September 1919
  - Incorporation into the RSFSR: March 1920
- Currency: Tumen
Preceded by	Succeeded by
Mountainous Republic of the Northern Caucasus	Mountain Autonomous Soviet Socialist Republic; Dagestan Autonomous Soviet Socialist Republic

The North Caucasian Emirate (Chechen: Къилбаседа-Кавказан Имарат, romanized: Q̇ilbaseda-Kavkazan Imarat) was an Islamic state that existed in the territory of Dagestan, Chechnya and Ingushetia during the Russian Civil War from September 1919 to March 1920.

The emirate's temporary capital was established in the village of Vedeno, and its leader, Uzun-Hajji (Узун-Хаджи), was given the title "His Majesty the Imam and the Emir of the North Caucasus Emirate, Sheikh Uzun Khair Haji Khan (Узун Хаир Хаджи Хан)".

In 1918, soldiers of the Russian White movement's Volunteer Army, under General Anton Denikin, began to clash with the peoples of the North Caucasus. Uzun-Hajji, with a small detachment of troops, took the village of Vedeno and declared war against Denikin.

In September 1919, Uzun-Hajji announced the creation of the North Caucasus Emirate as an independent monarchy under the protection of the Ottoman Sultan Mehmed VI. Ties were established with Kabardian and South Ossetian insurgents, as well as with Georgia, who recognized the emirate's authorities. However, they failed to remove Volunteer Army troops from the territory of the emirate and became dependent on Bolshevik aid until its suspension.

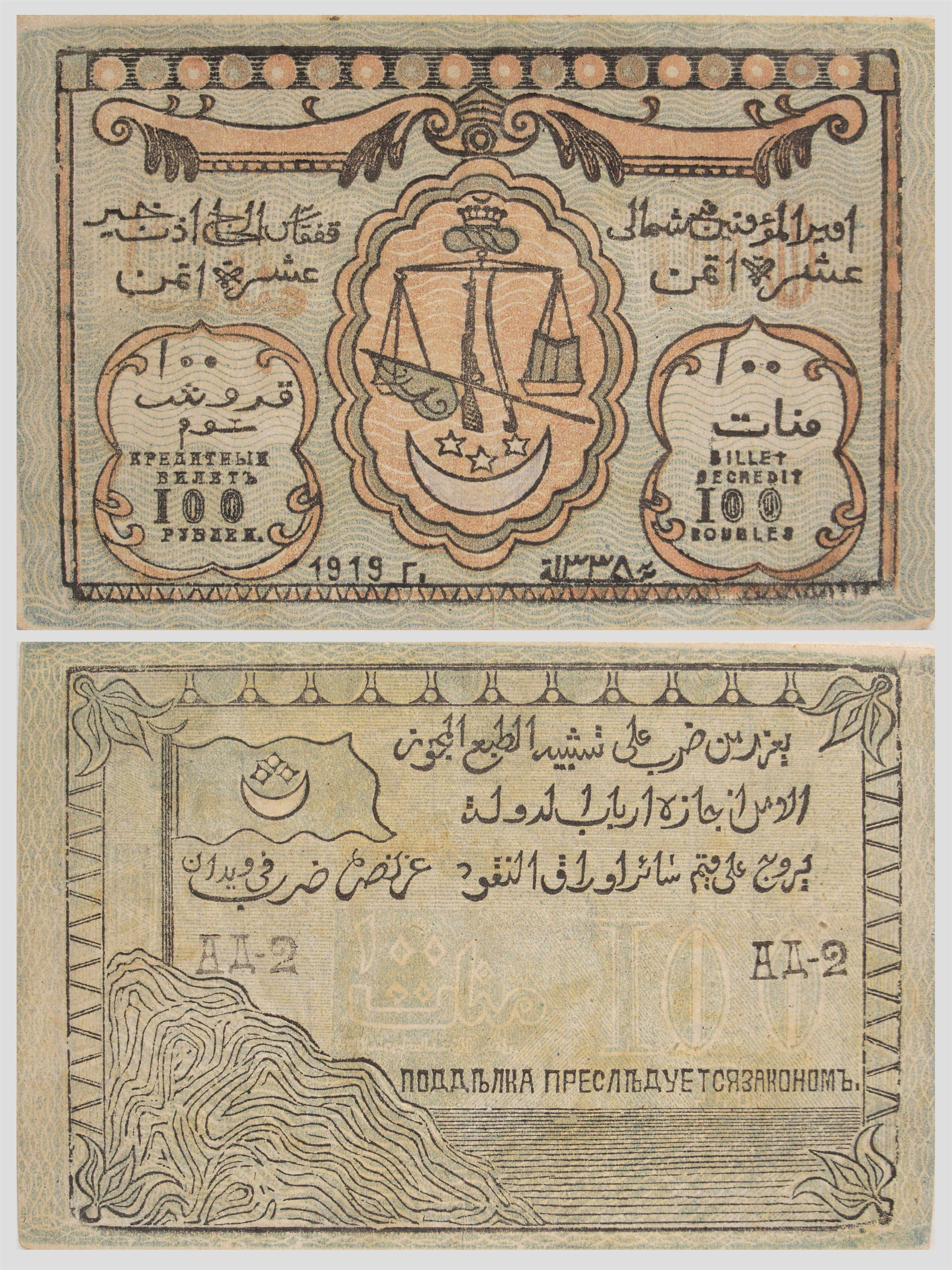
100 Tumens banknote of the North Caucasian Emirate.

Uzun-Hajji soon died, but the existence of the state led to the formation of the Mountain Autonomous Soviet Socialist Republic.

== See also ==
- Caucasian Imamate (1828–1859)
- Mountainous Republic of the Northern Caucasus (1918–1919)
- Caucasus Emirate (2007–2019)
