= Dagestan uprising =

Russian Civil War

- Part of the Southern Front of the Russian Civil War
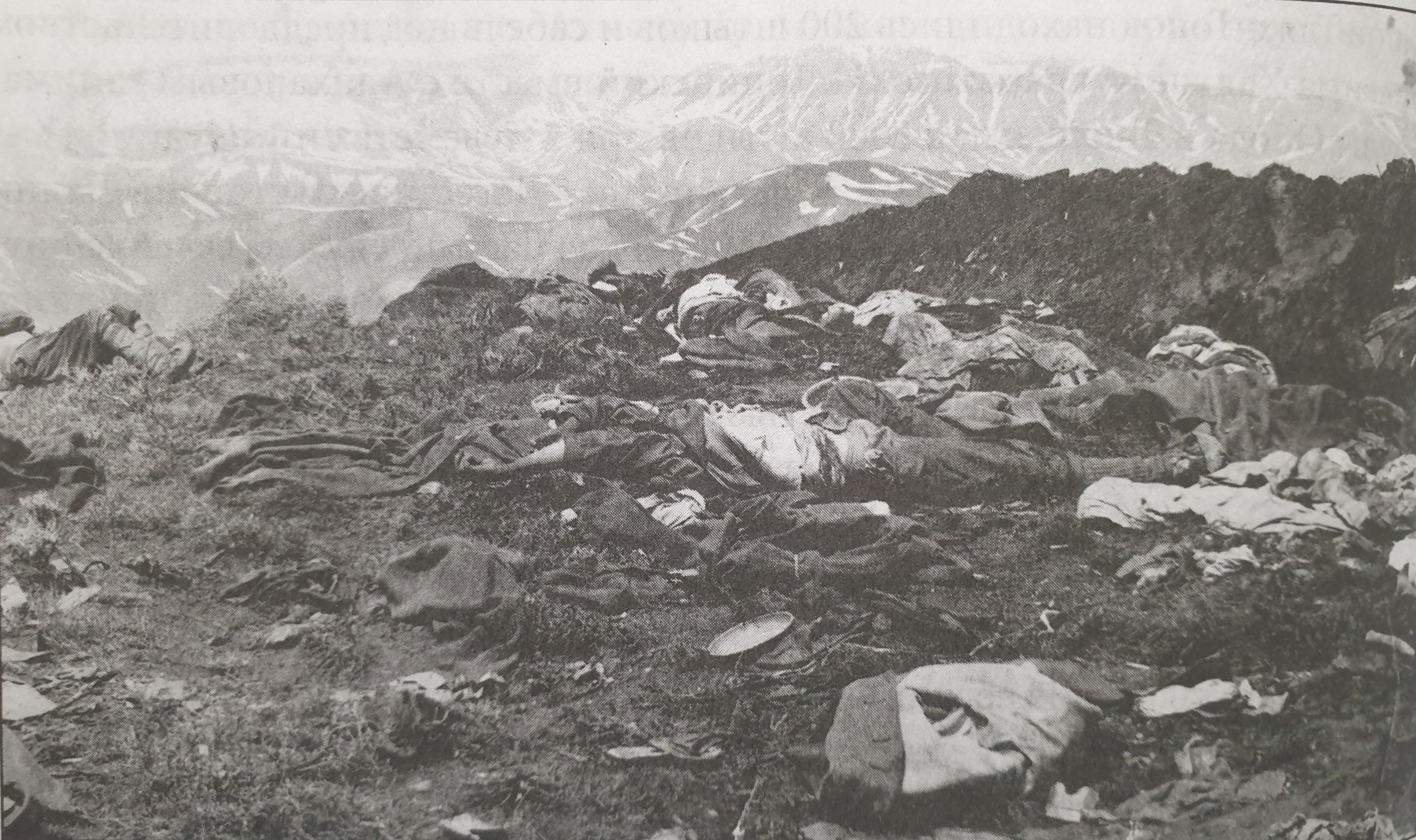
- dead bodies of the Red Army during the aftermath of the Battle of Botlikh
Date	September 1920 – 15 March 1921
Location	Dagestan, North Caucasus
Result	Soviet victory: Uprising suppressed

Belligerents
Dagestani rebels	Russian SFSR: Red Army; Chechens cavalery

Casualties and losses
Unknown	5,000 casualties

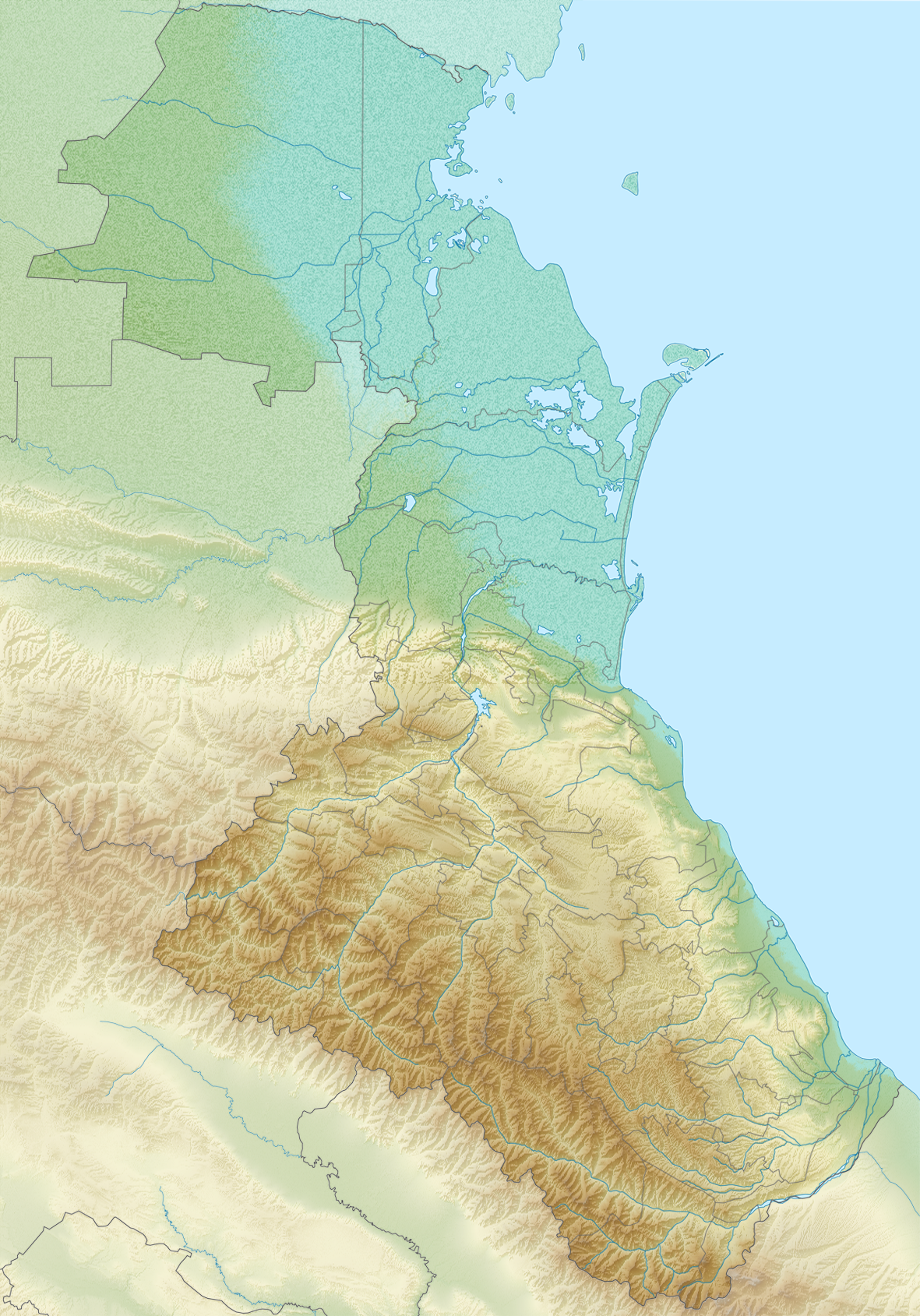
Dagestan Uprising 1920
Blue dot=U-shaped main road
Yellow dot=Canyon

The Dagestan uprising of 1920–1921 was an event during the Russian Civil War.

By the spring of 1920, Bolshevik forces controlled most of the Caucasus except Georgia. The uprising, led by the Naqshbandi brotherhood that had earlier supported Imam Shamil, began in September 1920, and by the end of the year the rebels controlled most of mountains of Dagestan. The Reds brought in reinforcements and defeated the rebels by March 1921, but fighting went on until the end of May.

While Bolshevik Red Army troops greatly outnumbered the rebels, most of them were Russians who knew little of the local geography, and especially of mountain warfare. Little assistance could be given by native Bolsheviks, as they had largely been killed earlier in the war. Red Army officers made a number of costly mistakes which hindered progress in defeating the rebellion.

The military geography had changed a good bit since the time of Shamil. Baku was now an oil boom town. There was a railroad up the coast from Baku which connected to the main rail network of Russia. Petrovsk (formerly Tarki, now Makhachkala) was an important port with a working class that might support the Bolsheviks. From Petrovsk there was a road and railroad to the military center of Temir-Khan-Shura (Buynaksk). From there a good road led south to the important road junction of Khanzhalmikhe. From it poorer roads led east and south. Also from Khanzhalmikhe a road led northwest to the Avar capital of Khunzakh and through Botlikh over the Andi ridge into Chechnya, Shamil's old capital of Vedeno and Grozny. This U-shaped route avoided the Avar Koysu canyon. The road crossed the canyon at the Salti Bridge west of Khanzhalmikhe, south of which was the Russian fort of Gunib. Most of the fighting was along or inside this U-shape.

Military equipment had also changed. Machine guns were now available, and artillery was more effective and easier to move. Sources note that Red Army armored cars presented a difficulty to the rebels, who lacked effective anti-tank weaponry. The Russians would usually win when they stayed on the roads and relied on numbers and artillery. In the mountains, Red Army garrisons could be surrounded, but the mountain rebels lacked the artillery and discipline for a proper siege or assault of these positions.

The Chechens generally stayed out of the fight. They were now oriented towards Vladikavkaz, and faced a denser Russian population. They were more concerned with potential conflict with the Cossacks, who had usually sided with the Whites against the Red Army.

== 1920 ==
The mountain rebels had usually supported the Reds against the Whites, but by March 1920 the Whites were driven out and cooperation changed to hostility. In August 1920 a meeting was called at Gidatl to organize resistance to the Red Army. Said Shamil, Shamil's grandson, arrived from Turkey to assume the position of nominal leader. Early in September rebel bands began crossing the main mountain chain from Menshevik controlled Georgia into the upper valleys of the Andi and Avar Koysus. Originally about 600 men, their number soon increased to around 6000 and perhaps 9700 by January 1921. The Reds responded by moving an inadequate force of about 1000 men up a defensive line around Botlikh-Khunzakh-Gunib. In late September much of the Botlikh force moved south and was destroyed. About the same time the Khunzakh force tried to move south and had to fight its way back with heavy loss. On 9 October the rebels captured the Salti bridge, cutting communication between Khunzakh and Gunib, partially besieging them. On 13 October a Red force was sent south from Temir-Khan-Shura to take Arikani but on 30 October it unwisely entered a narrow valley and all 700 men were trapped and killed. After 4 November the Red Army brought 2 more regiments under command of Tadorsky from Baku in order to relieve forces at Gunib and Khunzakh.

On 9–16 November the so-called First Model Revolutionary Discipline Rifle Regiment went south from Grozny and occupied Botlikh without much trouble. Two days later 250 men went east down the Andi Koysu to Muni, which they looted. They went further downstream to Ortakolo, were surrounded by rebels, including the enraged population of Muni, and were killed to the last man. Botlikh was surrounded, surrendered and all the disarmed Red soldiers (around 700) were slaughtered, with only a few escaping to Grozny. (Broxup says that all the commissars and officers were executed and the enlisted men stripped naked and left to freeze to death). In the second half of November Soviet forces spread out from Khunzakh and Gunib. On 7 December Red units in the Botlikh sector fell back on Khunzakh. On 10 December the rebels took Khanzhalmikhe, effectively besieging Khunzakh and Gunib for a second time. On 20–26 December an attempt to retake Khanzhalmikhe failed.

== 1921 ==
More troops were brought in and on 2 January Khanzhalmikhe fell and 140 prisoners were taken. This is the only mention of prisoners being taken throughout the war. Gunib was relieved the next day. North up the canyon was Gerghebil which was considered the key to the relief of Kunzakh. On 7 or 8 January 2686 men began the attack. On 26 January the place fell to a night attack. Todorsky justified the heavy losses on the grounds that difficult victories demoralized the enemy. Two days later Khunzakh was relieved for a second time. The next move was north down the canyon to Arikani and Gimry. Arikani fell on 14 February. Gimry had been battered by artillery from late December, and ninety percent of the village being destroyed. On 18 February it surrendered. With the core area occupied other places began to surrender. On the 19th Ashitla west of Gimry was occupied by 125 officer cadets. All were killed during the night and the next day 52 mutilated bodies were found. It is not clear what provoked this unusual brutality. The area to the northwest to the Chechen border was occupied: Botlikh (5 March), Andi (9 March) and northward (13 March). On 9–13 March the Dagestan Reds linked up with those in Chechnya. On 15 March the Petrovsk Military Soviet declared the uprising liquidated. Meanwhile, on 25 February, Tiflis was occupied by the Red army. With Georgia now under Soviet control the remaining rebels in Dagestan were surrounded. The rebels made their last stand at Gidatl where the uprising was first organized. It fell in May. Small bands continued to resist until the end of May. The remaining insurgents dispersed to their villages. Said Bey fled to Turkey. The war took the lives of 5000 Reds and an unknown number of mountaineers.
