= Apshi =

Apshi ХІáбщи
- Selo
- Apshi village
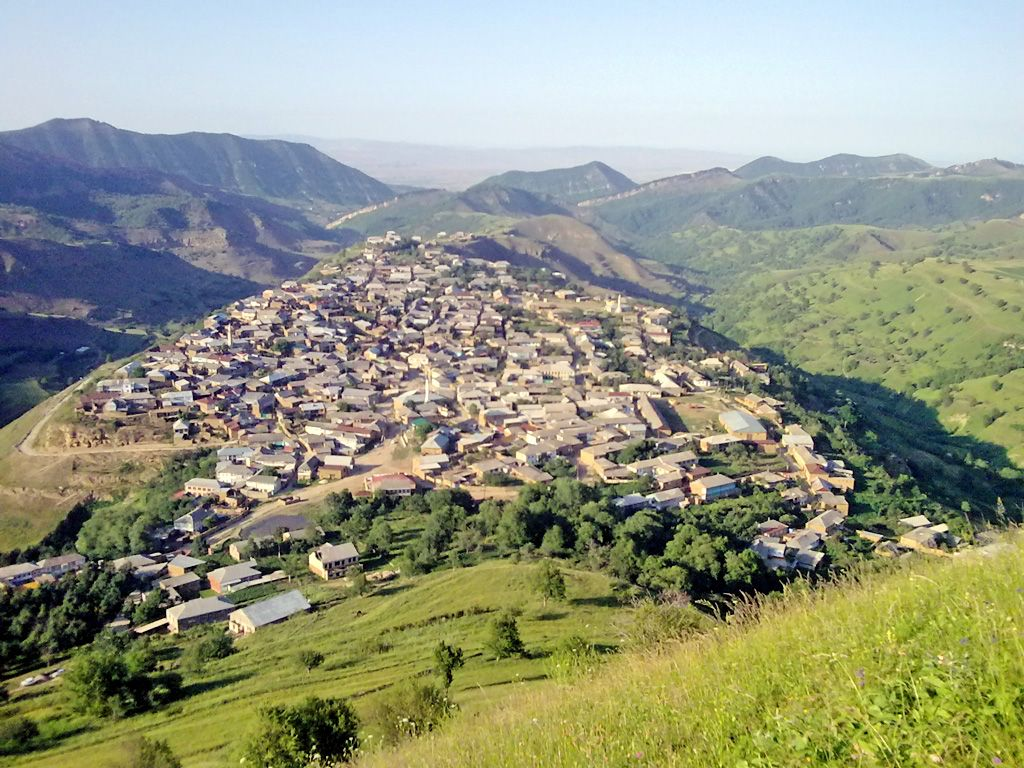
- The view of the village from the mountain

- Location within Republic of Dagestan Location within Russia
- Coordinates: 42°36′N 47°10′E
- Country: Russia
- Region: Republic of Dagestan
- District: Buynaksky District
- Established: 1527

Area
  - Total: 0,704 km^{2} (272 sq mi)

Dimensions
  - Length: 16 km (9.9 mi)
  - Width: 044 km (27 mi)
- Elevation: 1,350 m (4,430 ft)

Population (2021)
  - Total: 2,024
- Time zone: UTC+3:00 (Moscow Time)
- Postal code: 368204

Apshi (Russian: Апши, romanized: Apshi) is a rural locality (a selo) and the administrative centre of Apshinsky Selsoviet, Buynaksky District, Republic of Dagestan, Russia. There are 12 streets.

== Geography ==
The selo located at the foot of the Gimry Range. It is surrounded by several peaks, the most notable of which is cone-shaped Tsutara-meer, rising 1,575 m about sea level.

Apshi is located 24 km south of Buynaksk (the district's administrative centre) by road. Arykhkent is the nearest rural locality.

=== Climate ===
The climate of Apshi is humid continental. Average annual climatic parameters: temperature +13.8 °C, wind speed 4 m/s, air humidity 57%. Precipitation is about 33 mm per year

== Population ==
According to the All-Russian Population Census the selo is home to 2024 people.

96% of the village's population are Avars.
