= Salta, Republic of Dagestan =

Salta Салта СалтӀа
- Selo
- Location within Republic of Dagestan Location within Russia
- Coordinates: 42°23′N 47°04′E
- Country: Russia
- Region: Republic of Dagestan
- District: Gunibsky District
- Time zone: UTC+3:00

Salta (Russian: Салта; Avar: СалтӀа) is a rural locality (a selo) in Gunibsky District, Republic of Dagestan, Russia. The population was 683 as of 2010.

== Geography ==
Salta is located 20 km east of Gunib (the district's administrative centre) by road. Silta and Kudali are the nearest rural localities.
