= Vozdvizhenskoye =

Vozdvizhenskoye Воздвиженское
- Village
- Location within Vologda Oblast Location within Russia
- Coordinates: 58°47′N 39°54′E
- Country: Russia
- Region: Vologda Oblast
- District: Gryazovetsky District
- Time zone: UTC+3:00

Vozdvizhenskoye (Russian: Воздвиженское) is a rural locality (a village) in Yurovskoye Rural Settlement, Gryazovetsky District, Vologda Oblast, Russia. The population was 21 as of 2002.

== Geography ==
Vozdvizhenskoye is located 26 km southwest of Gryazovets (the district's administrative centre) by road. Kurazh is the nearest rural locality.
