= Kukni =

Kukni Кукни Кьукун
- Selo
- Location within Republic of Dagestan Location within Russia
- Coordinates: 42°07′N 47°09′E
- Country: Russia
- Region: Republic of Dagestan
- District: Laksky District
- Time zone: UTC+3:00

Kukni (Russian: Кукни; Lak: Кьукун) is a rural locality (a selo) in Khurinsky Selsoviet, Laksky District, Republic of Dagestan, Russia. The population was 63 as of 2010. There are 2 streets.

== Geography ==
Kukni is located 13 km southeast of Kumukh (the district's administrative centre) by road, on the left bank of the Khunnikh River. Khoykhi and Kani are the nearest rural localities.

== Nationalities ==
Laks live there.
