= 1978 Georgian demonstrations =

Protests in Tbilisi, Georgia

On 14 April 1978, demonstrations in Tbilisi, capital of the Georgian SSR, took place in response to an attempt by the Soviet government to change the constitutional status of languages in Georgia. After a new Soviet Constitution was adopted in October 1977, the Supreme Soviet of the Georgian SSR considered a draft constitution in which, in contrast to the Constitution of 1936, Georgian was no longer declared to be the sole state language. A series of indoor and outdoor actions of protest ensued and implied with near-certainty there would be a clash between several thousands of demonstrators and the Soviet government, but Georgian Communist Party chief Eduard Shevardnadze negotiated with the central authorities in Moscow and managed to obtain permission to retain the previous status of the Georgian language.

This highly unusual concession to an open expression of opposition to state policy of the Soviet Union defused popular anger in Tbilisi, but triggered tensions in the Abkhaz ASSR (Abkhazia), an autonomous republic in northwest Georgia, where Abkhaz Communist officials protested against what they saw as a capitulation to Georgian nationalism and demanded that their autonomy be transferred from Georgia to the Russian SFSR. The request was rejected but a number of political, cultural and economic concessions were made. Since 1990, 14 April has been celebrated in Georgia as the Day of the Georgian Language.

== Background ==
The late 1970s witnessed the reemergence of a Georgian national movement which called for the revival of Georgian national culture and, in its most radical form, saw no compromise to Georgia's ultimate independence from the Soviet Union, a rare instance of pro-independence dissident movement in the Union at the time. Although Georgian opposition intelligentsia preached avoidance of conflict with non-Georgian minorities, as such conflict would hamper the road to independence, and forged ties with the Russian dissidents of the time, including Andrei Sakharov, the movement had a strong anti-Russian emphasis and alarmed some minorities, especially in Abkhazia, where there was a lingering ethnic discord between Georgian and Abkhaz communities. In early 1977, the Soviet Committee for State Security (KGB) managed to suppress most Russian dissident groups and moved to Georgia, with the irreconcilable Georgian opposition leaders, Merab Kostava and Zviad Gamsakhurdia, being arrested in April. Such measures failed to curb the movement, however. New influential young dissidents such as Tamar Chkheidze, Avtandil Imnadze, later Giorgi Chanturia, and Irakli Tsereteli, emerged in support of the jailed leaders, and several underground publications (samizdat) were founded. During this period Georgia acquired the position of the republic with the highest level of per capita higher education in the Soviet Union, and the increasing number of students, especially the rural youth with higher education and with little connection to the Communist Party and Nomenklatura, formed a ground for anti-Soviet sentiments.

== Status of language ==
The three Transcaucasian republics—Georgia, Armenian SSR and Azerbaijan SSR—were the only Union republics where the language of a "titular nationality", in this case Georgian, enjoyed the status of sole state language. When in early 1978 the issue of adopting new constitutions in the republics, based on the 1977 Soviet Constitution, came up, an attempt was made by the Soviet authorities to remove the anomaly of the three Transcaucasian republics, replacing it with a clause giving an equally official status to the Russian language. The move was highly unpopular, but in Georgia the question of language was particularly sensitive and a negative outcry was quite predictable since a suggestion to hold certain courses in the local institutions of higher learning in Russian two years earlier, in April 1976, had provoked a public outrage. While the situation in Azerbaijan remained calm, the events proceeded in an unexpectedly dramatic manner in Georgia and to a lesser extent Armenia.

== Protests ==
Demonstrations broke out throughout Georgia, reaching their climax in Tbilisi on 14 April 1978, the day when the Supreme Soviet of the Georgian SSR convened to ratify the new legislation. An estimated 20,000, mainly university students, took to the streets. Several intellectuals, including the venerated 80-year-old linguist Akaki Shanidze, campaigned against reforming Article 75 (addressing the official status of Georgian), and leaflets calling for nationwide resistance appeared in the streets. The demonstrators marched to the House of the Government in downtown Tbilisi. The Soviet police (militsiya) officers managed to partially block the march, but around 5,000 people still managed to reach the government building, which was quickly surrounded by the Soviet army. The rest of the protesters gathered in and around Tbilisi State University. As the situation threatened to turn dangerous and rumors were coming of Soviet troops preparing for action, Eduard Shevardnadze, the First Secretary of the Georgian Communist Party Central Committee, addressed the demonstrators and reminded them about the student demonstrators shot by the Soviet army in Tbilisi on 9 March 1956. Although he was booed when he first tried to speak to the crowd, Shevardnadze was quick to react. He immediately contacted Moscow and asked for permission to leave Article 75 unchanged. While the shocked Kremlin was contemplating the issue, Shevardnadze came out and spoke to the demonstrators, explaining the situation and pledging his sympathies to their cause. Finally, the government—giving in to popular pressure—decided not to change the disputed clause. The demonstrators began gradually to withdraw only after Shevardnadze announced the final decision and read out the article affirming the status of Georgian as the state language of the Georgian SSR.

== Aftermath ==
Following this unprecedented concession to public opinion, Soviet authorities, alarmed by the mass actions in Georgia, abandoned similar amendments to the constitutions of Armenia and Azerbaijan and declared Armenian and Azerbaijani state languages at the republican level, without waiting for similar manifestations in either republic.

The language issue in the Transcaucasian republics revealed the sensitivity of the national problem in the region. The upsurge of the national movement in Georgia proper led to tensions between minorities as well, in particular with the Abkhaz, who interpreted the concession by the Soviet authorities as a retreat in the face of Georgian nationalism and saw this as an opportunity to secede from Georgia. In May 1978, several thousands of Abkhaz nationalists assembled in the village of Lykhny to support 130 Abkhaz Communists, who had signed the letter to Moscow, demanding that the Abkhaz ASSR be allowed to be transferred from Georgia to the Russian SFSR. The Kremlin dispatched I.V. Kapitonov, secretary of the Communist Party Central Committee, to Sukhumi and installed a new party leader, Boris Adleiba, in Abkhazia. Kapitonov declared that secession was impermissible, but the government acknowledged the seriousness of the Abkhaz problem by decreeing a costly plan "for the development of the economy and culture of the Abkhaz ASSR". An extra 500 million rubles were appropriated over seven years for economic investments such as a road-building program for infrastructure-poor Abkhazia, and cultural benefits such as the creation of an Abkhaz State University (with Abkhaz, Georgian, and Russian sectors), a State Folk Dance Ensemble in Sukhumi, and Abkhaz-language television broadcasting. Besides, ethnic quotas were established for certain bureaucratic posts, giving the Abkhaz a degree of political power that was disproportionate to their minority status in the autonomous republic.

Both the Georgian language and Abkhaz questions were high on the agenda throughout the following years. Georgians living in Abkhazia protested about discrimination against them at the hands of the Abkhaz Communist Party élite and demanded equal access to the autonomous structures. Several Georgian intellectuals petitioned Shevardnadze and the Soviet leader Leonid Brezhnev to address the situation. During 1981, at least five mass demonstrations took place in Georgia at which the Abkhaz question was raised once again alongside broader issues connected with the defense of Georgian language, history, and culture. The protesters also demanded the release of Avtandil Imnadze, the only person who was arrested in connection with the events of 14 April 1978 for having filmed the student demonstrations in Tbilisi. Although Shevardnadze managed to comply with popular opinion without being punished or reprimanded by the centre, probably due to the success of his economic policy in Georgia, he still sought to neutralise the dissident movement in order to retain his reputation as a successful and loyal Communist leader. Under increasing pressure from the authorities, the national movement suffered a setback in April 1979, when the prominent Georgian dissident, Zviad Gamsakhurdia, was pardoned after having repented his views, admitting his "errors of judgment" on nationwide television. As Gamsakhurdia's close associate, Merab Kostava, refused to surrender, he remained an untainted leader of the Georgian dissident movement until his release in 1987 and his mysterious death in a car crash in 1989. The anti-nationalist measures also included the dismissal of Akaki Bakradze, a popular professor who taught a course on Georgian literature at Tbilisi University and was known for his anti-Soviet feelings. In March 1981, over 1,000 students protested and achieved the restoration of Bakradze to his position. Later that month, large groups of students and intellectuals demonstrated in defence of Georgian national rights and submitted to the Georgian party leadership a document entitled "The Demands of the Georgian People". The petition included proposals to protect the status of the Georgian language, improve the teaching of Georgian history and the preservation of Georgian historical monuments, and protect the Georgians in Abkhazia. Other Georgian protests took place in the town of Mtskheta in October 1981, when 2,000 people demonstrated in defence of their native language. Unrest continued, and, in 1982, intellectuals protested against the arrest of dissenters on trumped-up charges.

== Legacy ==
The April 1978 demonstrations are considered by many as the starting point of a new phase of Georgia's national movement, which eventually led the country into widespread resistance to Soviet rule in the late 1980s and the declaration of Georgian independence on 9 April 1991. Since 1990, 14 April has been celebrated as the "Day of the Georgian Language". Although it is not an official holiday, it is customarily a date for commemorating the events of 1978 and summarizing what has been accomplished by the nation during the past year in the areas of teaching and research.
