= Dagestan movement =

- Part of Russo-Caucasian conflict
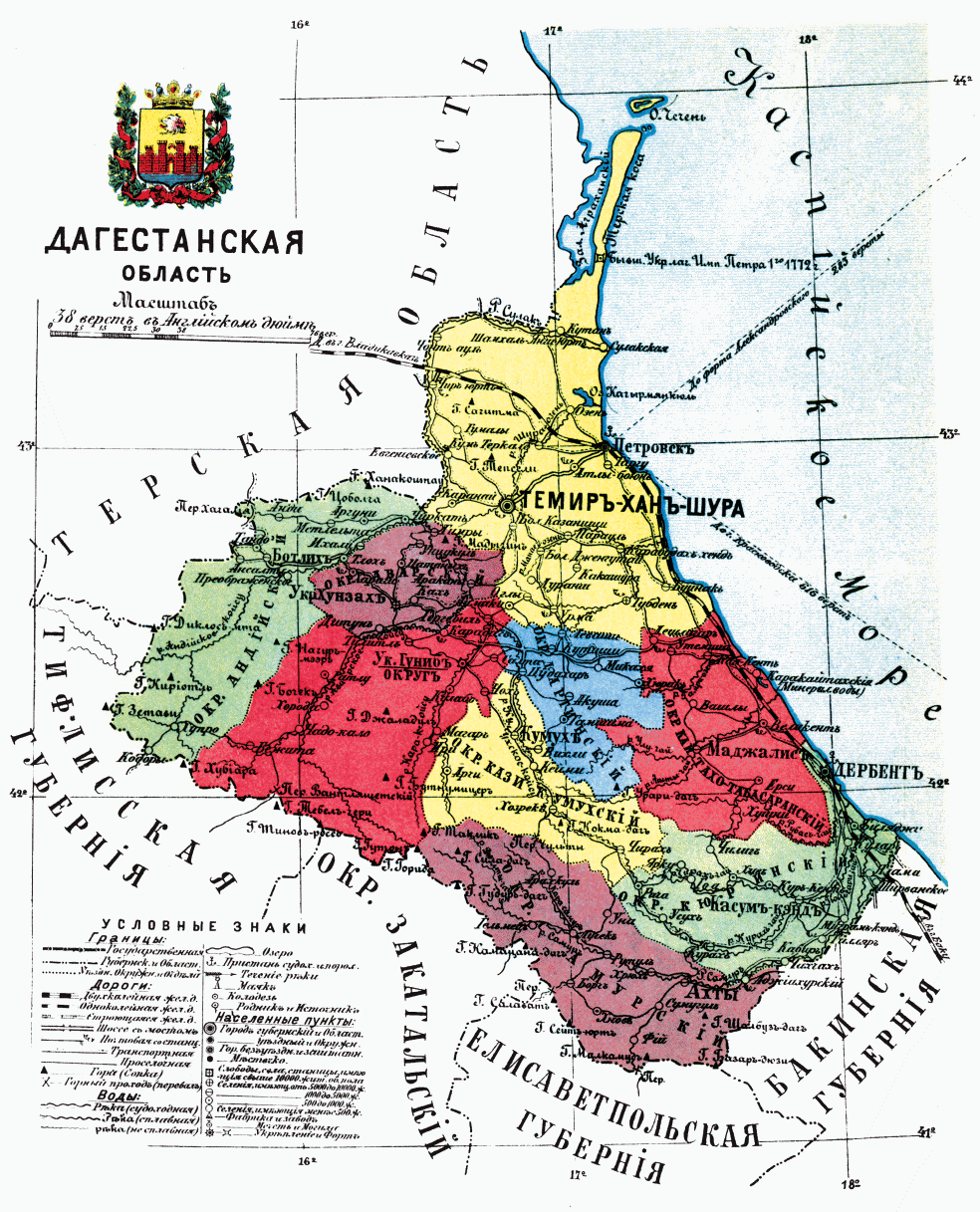
- Map of Dagestan, 1913
Date	1913-1914
Location	Dagestan
Result	Uprising suppressed

Belligerents
Dagestan rebels	Russian Empire

Commanders and leaders
Sayfula-Qadi (surrendered)	Sigismund Volsky

Strength
6,000	226

Dagestan movement or Dagestan anti-Pisar uprising (Russian: Дагестанское антиписарское восстание, romanized: Dagestanskoe antipisarskoe vostanie), was unrest occurred due to the translation of Arabic language office work into Russian.

Eventually, the reform was canceled, but a huge part of the enterprises still switched to Russian, unrest itself was suppressed, and their leaders were repressed.

== Background ==
After the annexation of Dagestan to Russia, moderate Russification took place on the territory, over time it reached the apogee of loyalty under Nicholas II.

The policy in the Caucasus will be aimed entirely at pacifying the region through the urgent introduction of self-government, jury trials and other things, as well as a number of agrarian and other reforms in the field of local life. Golitsyn's policy will be completely dismissed. All nationalities are equal and equally dear to the count, and the count considers the awakened self-awareness and national feeling in them to be quite a normal and sympathetic phenomenon. He wants to be strict with the administration and gentle with the people. All the reforms that will be given to Russia will be immediately extended to the Caucasus and the establishment of the viceroyalty will not slow down the development of the region one iota.

— Illarion Vorontsov-Dashkov

== Movement ==
In January-February 1914, there were several major riots in the cities, which were aimed at repealing the reform. March 13 of this year, a crowd of 6,000 people gathered from different regions of Dagestan, who went to Temir Khan Shura, however, on the outskirts of the city, one company of the Dagestan cavalry regiment drove back the rebels, and the next day completely suppressed. To avoid the development of the conflict, the tsarist government canceled the reform.

== Aftermath ==
Despite the cancellation of the reform, 77 out of 168 enterprises switched to Russian, which did not meet the requirements of the rebels, whose leaders were sent into exile.
