= Kikuni =

Kikuni Кикуни Кӏикӏуни
- Selo
- Location within Republic of Dagestan Location within Russia
- Coordinates: 42°30′N 47°02′E
- Country: Russia
- Region: Republic of Dagestan
- District: Gergebilsky District
- Time zone: UTC+3:00

Kikuni (Russian: Кикуни; Avar: Кӏикӏуни) is a rural locality (a selo) in Kukuninsky Selsoviet, Gergebilsky District, Republic of Dagestan, Russia. The population was 3,224 as of 2010. There are 36 streets.

== Geography ==
Kikuni is located 3 km northwest of Gergebil (the district's administrative centre) by road. Gergebil and Kurmi are the nearest rural localities.
