= Lezgin Bekdoms =

Lezgin states between 13th and 18th centuries

- 13th century–19th centuy
- flag used by Lezgin Militaryman in the Samur valley according to artist Grigory Gagarin Coat of arms

- Lezgin Bekdoms and unions in the Kurakh valley

- Lezgin and Rutul Bekdoms and unions in upper course of the Samur river
- Status: Decentralized hereditary rulers
- Largest city: Akhty
- Recognised national languages: Lezgian language Rutul language Aghul language Tsakhur language Tabasaran language
- Religion: Sunni Islam
- Demonyms: Lezgins; Kyurins
- Government: Malikates; Bekdoms; Free societies
- History
  - Gained independence from the disintegrating Kingdom of Lekia: 13th century
  - Absorbed into the Russian Empire: 19th centuy
Preceded by	Succeeded by
Lakzan	Lezgin Khanate; Russian Empire
- Today part of: Dagestan Azerbaijan

The Lezgin Bekdoms were lordships and local political entities associated with Lezgic speaking communities in southern Dagestan and northeastern Azerbaijan. their rulers, known as Beks (also spelled as Beys or Begs), had authority over settlements or wider territories across south Dagestan and north Azerbaijan. These Lordships existed alongside other forms of local government, including the village unions and free societies. The Lezgin Bekdoms alongside with neighboring small Khanates federations and free societies were mostly located on the Shores of the Samur river but sometimes went beyond that, an example of that can be the Kura Khanate which was located at the north of the Samur river not bordering the river itself.

== List of states ==
The Lezgin bekdoms, unions and societies formed after the disintegration of Lakzan were the following:

Bekdoms

- Akhtyn Bekdom (Centered around Akhty between mid-15th and the early 17th century) (The rulers might have also carried the title "Malik")
- Kakin Bekdom (Centered around Kaka between 18th and 19th century)
- Miskindzhin Bekdom (Centered around Miskindzha between 15th and 16th century)
- Rutul Bekdom (Centered around Rutul between 7th century and 1839)
- Gaptsakh Bekdom (centered around the Gaptsakh)
- Tselyagiun Bekdom (centered around Tselyagyun)

Free societies

- Kurakh Union (Centered around Kurakh between 14th century and 1812)
- Akhtypara Free Society (Divided into two autonomous entities between 1732 and 1839)
  - Akhtypara-1 (Akhtyn Free Society, centered around Akhty)
  - Akhtypara-2 (Khnov Free Society, centered around Khnov)
- Altypara Free Society (Centered around Karakyure and Mikrakh between 1630 and 1839)
- Dokuzpara Free Society (Centered around Dzhaba between 16th century and 1839)
- Tahircal Free Society (Centered around Tahircal between 7th century to 1839)
- Stal-Chile Union (Centered around Stal)
- Kabir Union (Centered around Kabir)
- Kartas Union (Centered around Kartas)
- Yarki Union (Centered around Yarki)

== History ==
The appearance of the first Lezgin Bekdoms or free societies can be traced back to the 13th century during the slow collapse of the Kingdom of Lekia, one of the first Lezgin Bekdoms was Akhty, more bekdoms appeared after Lekia fully disintegrated.

The title Bek was used by hereditary nobles and local rulers in several parts of Dagestan and Azerbaijan. The authority of individual beks varied according to the territory, the strength of their ruling family and their relationships with surrounding communities. Some ruling families participated in regional diplomacy and military alliances, while others exercised authority.

The Bekdoms and free societies often engaged in small conflicts with each other but under the threat of a bigger power they often united to defend themselves.

One of the most powerful and influential of the Bekdoms was Akhtypara and the Kurakh union (later known as Kura Khanate)

=== Lekianoba ===
Illustration of a Lezgin militaryman from the Samur valley, artist Grigory Gagarin in his work "Costumes du Caucase"

During the 16th to 18th Century The Lezgin Bekdoms often raided Goergia alongside with other Dagestani peoples, plundering and looting cities in their way. Lezgins often took captives in their raids and sold them into slavery to the neighboring Ottoman Empire. These raids severely devastated the kingdoms of Kartli and Kakheti but after unification under the rule of king Eekele II the frequency of Lezgin raids significantly diminished. one of the successful campaigns of Lezgins during the Lekianoba was in 1724 against Kakheti, where Lezgins ravaged Kakheti to such extent that forced Constantine II to leave his country and give military access to the Lezgins.

=== Unification under Haji Davud ===
During the Lezgin campaign into Shirvan, Haji Davud managed to unite much of the Lezgin Bekdoms and free societies under his authority to unite arms against Persia and expand the influence of his short-lived Shirvan Khanate.

He first united the Bekdoms in the year 1720, many Beks swore loyalty to him and served as commanders in his campaign themselves helping Davud expand into Quba and Central Shirvan.

== Russian imperial period ==
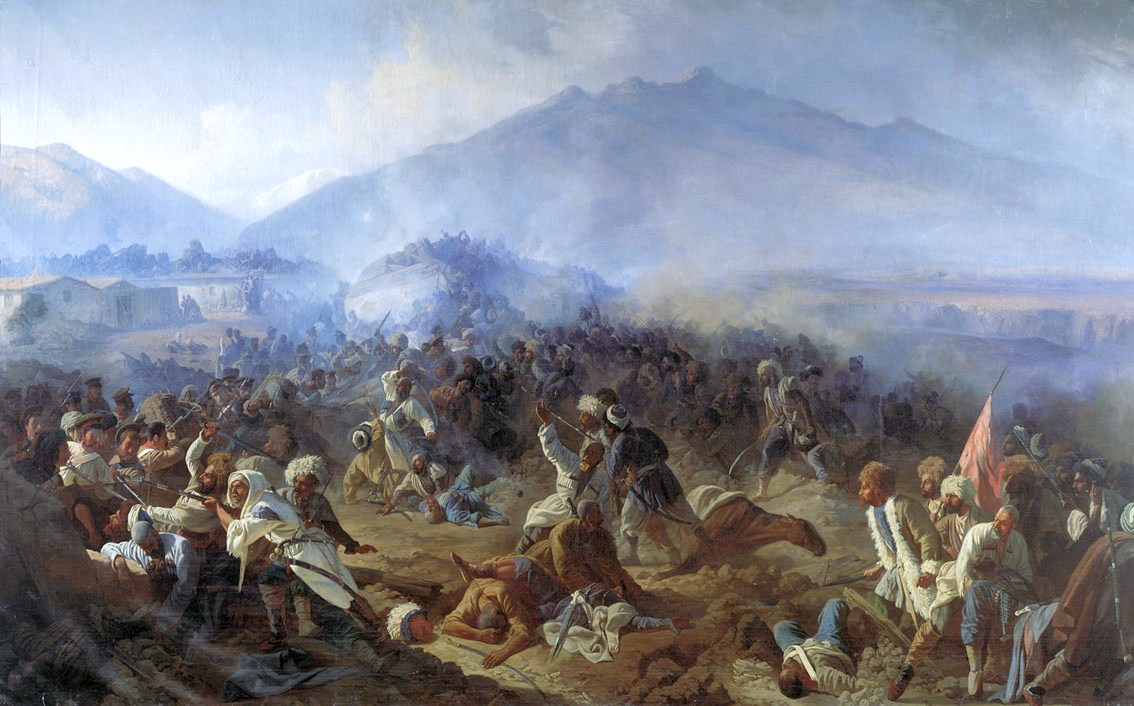
Storm of Akhty 1848

Russian expansion into the eastern Caucasus transformed the political organization of the region. Following the Russo-Persian War and the consolidation of Russian authority during the nineteenth century, local lordships and village unions increasingly came under imperial administration.

The Russian authorities reorganized territories previously governed by local khans, beks and community institutions. In the Kura region, the Kura Khanate was abolished in 1864 and its territory incorporated into the Kyurinsky district of Dagestan Oblast. These administrative changes brought the independent political existence of several traditional local authorities to an end.
