= Akhtypara =

Lezgin Free Society (1732-1839)

Akthyparin Free Society Ахцагрьин кIватIал
- 1732–1839
- Map of Akhtypara and other Samur societies
- Status: Caucasian Free Society
- Capital: Akhty and Khnov
- Common languages: Predominantly Lezgin, Rutul in Khnov and Borch
- Religion: Sunni Islam
- Historical era: Early Modern
  - End of Bek rule in Akhty: 1732
  - Incorporated into the Russian Empire: 1839
Preceded by	Succeeded by
Akhtyn Bekdom	Russian Empire
- Today part of: Dagestan

Akhtypara or Akhtyparin Free Society (Lezgian: Ахцагрьин кIватIал, Russian: Ахтыпаринское вольное общество) was a Lezgin free society centered in the modern Akhtynsky District, which existed from 1732 to 1839. The society appeared shortly after the decline of Bek rule in Akhty, Akhtypara established itself as one of the most influential societies of the Samur valley expanding its borders into neighboring societies in the mid 18th century.

== Name ==
The name Akhtypara combines the Lezgin name of the head village, Akhty ("our village" or "native aul") and Turkic word para ("part" or "share").

== Geography ==
Akhtypara was located in the middle shores of the Samur River valley in southern Dagestan. Its territory included settlements along the Samur River and in the Akhtychay gorge. The principal settlement was the village of Akhty. The society also included communities on both banks of the Samur and in the surrounding mountain valleys. It bordered the Kyura societies to the north (the Kyura Khanate from 1812), Dokuzpara and the village of Miskindzha to the east, the Rutul union to the west, and the Shaki Khanate to the south.

== Administration ==
=== Government ===
Akhtypara was a union of rural communities in which authority was dependent on local institutions rather than a hereditary monarchy. Its principal governing bodies included the "Aksakals" (elders), a council of elders, and Islamic judges known as "qadis". The elders played a central role in local administration and the resolution of disputes. The political structure was based increasingly on territorial communities rather than exclusively on kinship ties. By the beginning of the nineteenth century, the union included both Lezgin-speaking communities and the Rutul villages of Khnov and Borch.

=== Privileges of Akhty ===
The village of Akhty held several customary privileges over the other villages of the Akhtyn Society:

Mediation: Villages could not settle disputes among themselves without Akhty’s mediators.
Military aid: Villages had to send help on Akhty’s request, and Akhty owed them protection in return.
Zakat: Akhty’s aksakals and efendis supervised the collection of the alms tax, which was collected in the autumn as a share of sheep. Akhty kept a third or a quarter, and the rest remained with the paying village for its poor and for community needs, especially war.
Pakhta: Each Akhty resident could visit any village of the district once a year, often in parties of 100 to 500, and be fed with their horses for one day. The custom attached to the village, not the visitor.
Blood price: The blood price for an Akhty resident was 600 sheep when paid by residents of subordinate villages, while an Akhty resident paid 300 for a death there.
Barkhu: A man marrying an Akhty woman paid 3 rubles, or goods of that value, to the Akhty quarter she belonged to.

=== Territory ===
The jamaat (community) of Akhty held the dominant position, and the union was divided into two parts:

Akhtyn Society comprised nine villages that Akhty's aksakals effectively governed before 1776. Villages of Gogaz, Usur and Kaka joined in 1776 bringing the number to twelve. Its constituent villages were:

- Akhty, Khkem, Khulya, Gra, Gdynk, Kudchakh, Midzhakh, Smugul, Khal, Gogaz, Usur and Kaka

Khnov Society comprised five villages in the upper Akhtychay basin. Its constituent villages were:

- Khnov, Borch, Gdym, Maza and Fiy

== History ==
=== End of Bek rule in Akhty ===
The Akhtypara union developed following the decline of the authority of the local Beks in Akhty and the polity became a communal union under elected elders. Akhty also developed as a centre of Islamic education and manuscript copying in southern Dagestan. It formed part of the network of self-governing rural unions in southern Dagestan commonly known as the Samur free societies. Although the first written references to the union date from the early eighteenth century, the formation of such communal political structures in the Samur valley began earlier.

=== Nader Shah's Dagestan campaign ===
In 1734, during Nader Shah's Caucasus campaign, the troops of the Iranian commander Nadir Shah approached Akhty. Having destroyed the bridge over the Samur, the Akhtyns took refuge in the Shahbani fortress, sent the population unable to fight to the mountains, and prepared for defense. However, the Iranians managed to restore the bridge within a day and proceed to storm the fortress. They also sent a detachment in pursuit of the population hiding in the mountains. Soon the fortress was taken by storm. Most of the population was slaughtered, the village was subjected to great devastation. Despite the defeat, the Akhtyns were not subjugated, as evidenced by the participation of the Akhtyns, along with the Qubans and Kyurins, in the siege of the Khudat fortress after the departure of Nadir Shah from Dagestan. In 1735, Nadir Shah invaded Tabasaran, from where he sent a 6,000-strong punitive detachment to the Akhtyparin and Dokuzparin free societies. Refugees from the Samur Valley were stopped by the Iranians near the village of Kabir. Further, the detachment proceeded along the Samur Valley, pillaging Altypara, Dokuzpara and Akhtypara in turn. In 1738 Akhtyparin forces joined the Jaro-Belokan societies' uprising and took part in the battle at Jinikh, where the Iranian commander Ibrahim Khan, Nadir's brother, and Ughurlu Khan of Ganja was killed.

=== Akhtyn Expansion ===
In the mid-eighteenth century, Akhtypara comprised fourteen villages, including Akhty, Khnov, Borch, and several smaller settlements in the Samur valley and the Akhtychay basin. The union subsequently expanded, incorporating additional communities of Gogaz, Usur and Kaka which were previously under the rule of Rutul in 1776. In 1782, the Akhtyns entered the war with the Miskindzhans. In the conflict, Miskindzha was assisted by Dokuzpara. Akhty resorted to the help of Surkhay Khan of Kazikumukh and Umma Khan V of Avaria. As a result, in December 1782, Miskindzha was burned down. Between 1803 and 1804 the Akhtyn-Miskindzha conflict was repeated.

=== Quba Uprising and Russian Conquest ===
During the early nineteenth century, Akhtypara came under increasing Russian influence. In 1811, the Samur communities formally entered into a relationship of submission to the Russian Empire, although they retained substantial internal autonomy. The society continued to exercise practical independence in many internal affairs and participated in regional resistance to Russian expansion. They kept their internal autonomy and pledged tribute in sheep, but paid it irregularly. Akhtypara kept practical independence until 1839. The Samur valley's people took an active part in the Quba uprising of 1837, in which the Akhtyn leader Sheikh Mulla was a major figure. On 3–4 July 1838 the Akhtyparin militia under Sheikh Mulla, together with Rutul, Dokuzparin and Altyparin detachments, was defeated near Karakyure by the corps of Lieutenant General Fezi. In 1839 large Russian forces under General Golovin entered the Samur valley. After heavy fighting in the Adzhiakhur gorge the resistance was crushed, and the army reached Akhty, which was taken on 5 June 1839. Former free society was incorporated into the Russian imperial administrative system as part of the Samurskiy okrug.

== See also ==
- Akhtyn Bekdom
- Dokuzpara
- Altypara
- Quba Khanate
