= Dokuzpara =

Lezgin Free Society (16th century-1839)

Dokuzparin Free Society Чеперин кIватIал
- 16th century–1839
- Map of Dokuzpara and other Samur societies
- Status: Caucasian Free Society
- Capital: Dzhaba
- Common languages: Lezgin
- Religion: Sunni Islam
- Historical era: Early Modern
  - Established: 16th century
  - Incorporated into the Russian Empire: 1839
Preceded by	Succeeded by
Dokuzparin Bekdom	Russian Empire
- Today part of: Dagestan

Dokuzpara, Dokuzparin Free Society or Cheper Free Society (Lezgian: Чеперин кIватIал, Russian: Докузпари́нское (Чеперское) вольное общество) was a Lezgin free society centered in the modern Dokuzparinsky District and Akhtynsky District. The union is first attested in a 15th-century chronicle that describes events of the late 14th and early 15th centuries, and it existed until 1839.

== Name ==
The name Dokuzpara combines the Turkic words dokuz ("nine") and para ("part" or "share") referring to the nine villages of the union.

== Geography ==
Dokuzpara was located in the right bank of the Samur River valley in southern Dagestan. The principal settlement was the village of Dzhaba. It bordered the Samur river and Miskindzha to the north, Altypara to the east, the Akhtypara to the west, and the Shaki Khanate to the south.

== Administration ==
=== Village government ===
Each village was governed by a village assembly, a council of elders called Aksakals ("white-beards") and a village cleric, an Efendi or Mulla. The aksakals were the main officials, one in some villages and several in others, and were assisted by a Chaush, a herald and enforcer of the assembly's decisions. Adult men took part in the assembly; women did not. Decisions were taken by majority vote, although the final word often rested with the stronger kin groups. Officials were almost always chosen from among native residents and enjoyed privileges such as exemption from certain duties, including guard service.

=== Territory ===
Dokuzparin Society comprised nine villages that were governed by a council of aksakals and a cleric. The village of Miskindzha is sometimes counted as the tenth: Remikhanova writes that it was periodically attached to the union, and Ibragimova counts it as a tenth village that joined later. According to most accounts its constituent villages were:

- Dzhaba, Baludzha, Yaldzhukh, Lgapirkent, Khrakh, Filidzakh, Ukhul, Dzhigdzhig and Ikhir

== History ==
=== Origins ===
The earliest written reference to Dokuzpara is in the chronicle of Mahmud of Khinalug, which deals with events in Dagestan and Shirvan in the 14th and 15th centuries and was compiled in 1456–57. According to the historian Boris Aliev, during the reign of the Shirvanshah Ibrahim I, members of the Utsmi dynasty of Kaitag came to rule almost every village of southern Dagestan, among them Dokuzpara, Akhty and Miskindzha, as the chronicle records.

Historians disagree about how and when Dokuzpara became an independent union. Pashaev writes that Ibrahim I placed the largest villages of the middle Samur under Ilchi Ahmad of Samur Emirate and Ilchi Ahmad's sons, on condition that they guard the northern frontier of Shirvan and with the right to pass the territory on by inheritance. Ilchi Ahmad's descendants, the beks of Akhty and other villages of the Samur valley. Remikhanova, like some other scholars, holds that it arose from the fragmentation of a larger polity centred on Akhty into three unions: Akhtypara, Dokuzpara and Altypara. Pashaev dates the formation of the three unions to the early 17th century, after the overthrow of the beks. Ibragimova argues from Mahmud of Khinalug's chronicle that Dokuzpara already existed as a separate political entity in the late 14th century, contrary to the traditional view that it became independent only from the late 16th or early 17th century, and that it was never part of the Akhty union. Remikhanova notes that very little information about the union survives for the 15th and 16th centuries.

=== Safavid and Ottoman rivalry ===
In the early 17th century Dokuzpara, like other Samur unions, came within the sphere of influence of the Safavid shah Abbas I, and at the start of the 18th century it was under the protection of the ruler of Derbent, who was appointed by the shah from among local feudal lords.

The Samur unions took an active part in the broad anti-Safavid movement of the first quarter of the 18th century, led by Haji Davud of Mushkur supported by Surkhay Khan I of Kazikumukh. Ibragimova writes that Dokuzparin Lezgins took up arms against Iranian rule under Haji Davud, that the uprising ended with the capture of Shamakhi, the main Safavid stronghold in Shirvan, and the establishment of Lezgin Khanate under Haji Davud, who would later be removed from power after an agreement between Surkhay Khan and the Ottoman Sultan.

Under the Treaty of Constantinople of 1724 between Russia and the Ottoman Empire, the Akhtypara, Dokuzpara, Altypara and Rutul societies were placed within the Ottoman sphere of influence. In 1735, under the Treaty of Ganja, Dokuzpara again fell within the Iranian sphere.

=== Nader Shah's Dagestan campaign ===
In the mid-1730s Nader Shah sought to subdue the Samur unions in his Caucasus campaign. In 1735, Nadir Shah invaded Tabasaran, from where he sent a 6,000-strong punitive detachment to Akhtypara, Dokuzpara and Altypara, which it ravaged. The 19th-century historian Hasan Alqadari wrote that the shah punished the inhabitants of the Dokuzpara and Akhtypara villages severely for their repeated defiance. Remikhanova concludes that Nader Shah did not succeed in subjugating the union, because the Dokuzparins, like other peoples of Dagestan, fought his troops stubbornly.

=== Quba Uprising and Russian Conquest ===
Dokuzpara and the other Samur unions came under Russian suzerainty in the early 19th century. The Russian government promised the Samur unions its protection and allowed them to graze their sheep on the lands of the Quba and Shaki Provinces. The unions owed tribute in sheep, one per hundred according to a 1813 report by Nikolay Rtishchev. According to data from the 1830s, Akhtypara, Dokuzpara, and Altypara maintained constant contact with the Yukharybash, Anykhdara, and Syrt magals, obtaining wheat, rice, petroleum, and other goods from them." It was further noted that "many of their inhabitants have relatives and close associates in the Yukharybash magal. Dokuzpara kept practical independence until 1839. The Samur valley's people took an active part in the Quba uprising of 1837, in which the Akhtyn leader Sheikh Mulla was a major figure. On 3–4 July 1838 the Akhtyparin militia under Sheikh Mulla, together with Rutul, Dokuzparin and Altyparin detachments, was defeated near Karakyure by the corps of Lieutenant General Fezi. In 1839 large Russian forces under General Golovin entered the Samur valley. After heavy fighting in the Adzhiakhur gorge the resistance was crushed, and the army reached Akhty. Former free society was incorporated into the Russian imperial administrative system as part of the Samurskiy okrug.

== See also ==
- Akhtypara
- Altypara
- Quba Khanate
