= Altypara =

Lezgin Free Society (1630-1839)

Altyparin Free Society Миграгърин кIватIал
- 1630–1839
- Map of Altypara and other Samur societies
- Status: Caucasian Free Society
- Capital: Karakyure or Mikrakh
- Common languages: Lezgin
- Religion: Sunni Islam
- Historical era: Early Modern
  - Established: 1630
  - Incorporated into the Russian Empire: 1839
Preceded by	Succeeded by
Samur Emirate	Russian Empire
- Today part of: Dagestan

Altypara, Altyparin Free Society or Mikrakh Free Society (Lezgian: Миграгърин кIватIал, Russian: Алтыпари́нское вольное общество) was a Lezgin free society centered in the modern Dokuzparinsky District, which existed from 1630 to 1839. It was a small union of six villages in the eastern part of the Samur River valley, governed by elected village elders and a popular assembly.

== Name ==
The name Altypara combines the Turkic words altı ("six") and para ("part" or "share") referring to the six villages of the union.

== Geography ==
Altypara occupied the eastern part of the Samur valley in southern Dagestan. To the west it bordered Dokuzpara, to the north its lands reached the Kyura societies, to the south it bordered the Shaki Khanate and to the east the territory of the Quba Khanate.The high peak of Shalbuzdag lies within the former territory of Altypara, a few kilometres from the village of Kurush.

== Administration ==
=== Village government ===
Altypara was a union of village communities with no hereditary ruler. Each village had its own elder (starshina), chosen from prominent kin groups (tukhums) at a popular assembly, usually for one year. The elder managed daily affairs and settled economic, family and other disputes. He convened and led the assembly and was accountable to it. The community (djamaat) backed its elders, and disobeying their decisions was penalised with a fine. J. G. Gerber recorded that each village had its own elder however that the inhabitants were not very obedient to them, because each considered himself his own master.

=== Territory ===
Altyparin Society comprised six villages that were governed by the locally elected elders. F. F. Simonovich, who surveyed southern Dagestan in 1796, named Karakyure as the principal settlement of the union, lying on the right bank of the Samur and having about 150 households. According to most accounts its constituent villages were:

- Karakyure, Maka, Mikrakh, Kaladzhukh, Kurush, Tekipirkent

== History ==
=== Origins ===
Altypara belonged to the group of self-governing village unions of the Samur Valley which, together with Akhtypara and Dokuzpara, formed out of the older Samur vilayet. These unions developed their own forms of communal government after the decline of the local rule of beks. Gerber, who wrote in 1728, treated the Samur valley communities as separate districts with a common character, describing five districts in total: Rutul, Akhty, Altypara, Dokuzpara and Miskindzha . Altypara is dated to 1630, when Mikrakh became the administrative center of the new society. Sources disagree on the center: Khashaev names Mikrakh, Simonovich names Karakyure.

Gerber also recorded a tradition told by the people of Altypara about Tamerlane. According to this account, the ancestors of the Altyparins had been obedient to Timur not as subjects but through a friendship contract, joining him in war and helping him. They also said that through an agreement with Timur they had adopted Islam, having been idolaters before. Aliev considers the tradition to reflect a real passage of Timur's armies through the Samur valley. Timur's armies entered Dagestan three times, and the campaign of 1386 pursued Tokhtamysh as far as Derbent and beyond.

=== Resistance to Derbent and Persian rule ===
Gerber reported that that the Derbent sultans had tried more than once to force the unions into Persian allegiance and had repeatedly sent large detachments from Derbent to bring them under control, but the highlanders had always resisted and sent the Derbent forces back. Because the area was no profit and value, Samur societies were moslty left alone.

The Samur unions took an active part in the broad anti-Safavid movement of the first quarter of the 18th century, led by Haji Davud of Mushkur supported by Surkhay Khan I of Kazikumukh. Gerber writes that Altyparin Lezgins took up arms against Iranian rule under Haji Davud, stating that the Lezgins of this region gave considerable help to Daud-Bek and Surkhay during the Shirvan rebellion, took booty and enriched themselves. The uprising ended with the capture of Shamakhi, the main Safavid stronghold in Shirvan, and the establishment of Lezgin Khanate under Haji Davud, who would later be removed from power after an agreement between Surkhay Khan and the Ottoman Sultan.

Under the Treaty of Constantinople of 1724 between Russia and the Ottoman Empire, the Akhtypara, Dokuzpara, Altypara and Rutul societies were placed within the Ottoman sphere of influence. In 1735, under the Treaty of Ganja, Altypara again fell within the Iranian sphere.

=== Nader Shah's Dagestan campaign ===
In the mid-1730s Nader Shah sought to subdue the Samur unions in his Caucasus campaign. In 1735, Nadir Shah invaded Tabasaran, from where he sent a 6,000-strong punitive detachment to Akhtypara, Dokuzpara and Altypara, which it ravaged. The 19th-century historian Hasan Alqadari wrote that the shah punished the inhabitants of the Dokuzpara and Akhtypara villages severely for their repeated defiance.

=== Quba Uprising and Russian Conquest ===
In 1809 the Samur societies asked to enter Russian subjection, and the arrangement was formalised in February 1811. Its terms, as given in the literature, were that they recognised only the authority of Russia as exercised from Quba. Russia guaranteed their flocks on winter pastures in Quba, Shaki and elsewhere, and in return they would give one sheep in every hundred to the treasury. The Samur communities kept substantial internal autonomy and paid tribute irregularly.

In 1837 unrest spread through the Quba province, triggered by the recruitment of local men into a mounted Muslim regiment and by wider grievances against Russian officials. Large numbers of Samur valley fighters joined the siege of Quba. Warriors from Karakyure, Mikrakh, Miskindzha and Akhty are specifically named among them.

Russian officials suspected the Samur societies of urging neighbouring regions to join the uprising. A force was sent into the valley in 1838. The Dokuzpara–Altypara alliance was led by Magomed-bek of Miskindzha. In the campaign of 1839, the forces of the Samur societies gathered near Mikrakh. Having failed to agree terms that would have ended their independence, they withdrew to prepared positions at Adzhakhur. After heavy fighting in the Adzhakhur gorge the resistance was crushed, and the army reached Akhty, which was taken on 5 June 1839. Former free society was incorporated into the Russian imperial administrative system as part of the Samurskiy okrug.

== See also ==
- Akhtypara
- Dokuzpara
- Quba Khanate
