= Usukhchay River =

Usukhchay Усухчай
- The Usukhchay River in the village of Usukhchay

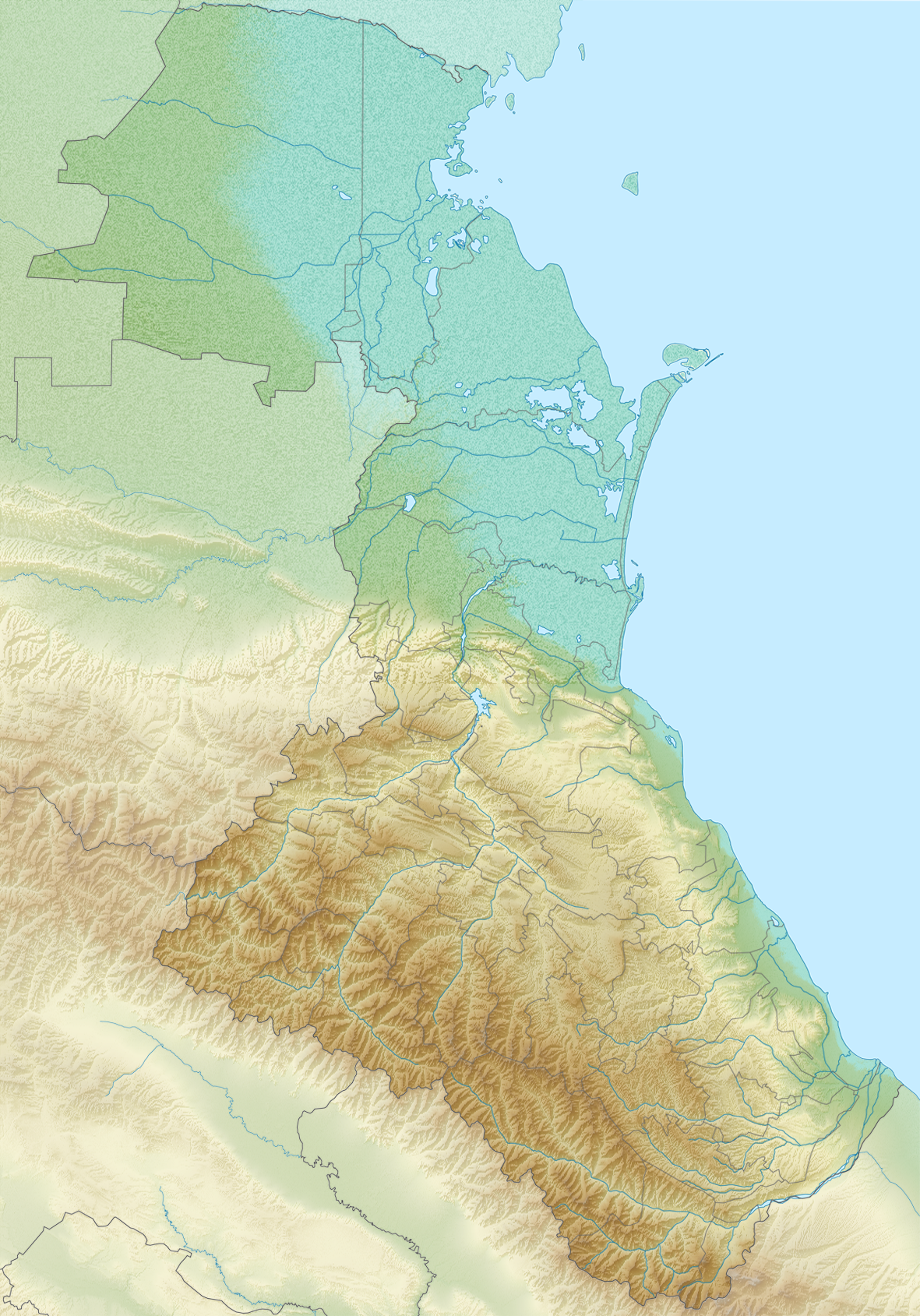
- Location of the river in Dagestan Usukhchay River (Republic of Dagestan)
- Native name: Усугъ вацӏ, Чӏехи вацӏ (Lezgian)

Location
- Country: Russia
- Republic: Dagestan
- District: Dokuzparinsky District

Physical characteristics
- Source: Mullar Glacier, Main Caucasian Range
  - location: Dagestan, Russia
  - coordinates: 41°12′58″N 47°42′53″E
  - elevation: 3,730 m (12,240 ft)
- Mouth: Samur River
  - location: Dagestan, Russia
  - coordinates: 41°25′17″N 47°54′41″E
  - elevation: 824 m (2,703 ft)
- Length: 37 km (23 mi)
- Basin size: 272 km^{2} (105 mi^{2})

Basin features
- Progression: Samur River → Caspian Sea
- River system: Samur River

Usukhchay (Russian: Усухчай; Lezgian: Усугъ вацӏ, Чӏехи вацӏ) is a river in Dokuzparinsky District, Dagestan, Russia It is a right tributary of the Samur River.

== Geography ==
The river originates from the Mullar Glacier in the Main Caucasian Range. It is 37 km long and has a drainage basin of 272 km^{2}. Its source is at an elevation of 3,730 m above sea level, while its mouth lies at 824 m above sea level. The total elevation drop is 2,890 m.

== Tributes ==
The Usukhchay River's principal tributaries include Cholokhsu, Vakhchagchay, Charynchay, Ragdan chay, Seldy, Shalbuzchay, and Chadaurchay.

== Hydrology ==
The Usukhchay has a mixed feeding regime, with its right-bank tributaries receiving water primarily from snowmelt and glacial meltwater originating in the Main Caucasian Range and its spurs. The river is characterized by a spring–summer high-water period and a pronounced winter low-water period. Rainfall floods also occur in summer and autumn.

The river flows through a relatively narrow valley, 20–50 m wide, before reaching the village of Usukhchay. Downstream of the village, the valley widens considerably, reaching up to 1 km in places.

== Economic Use of the River ==
The river's water is used for irrigation. The Kurush Hydroelectric Power Station, with an installed capacity of 0.48 MW, has been operating near the village of Tekipirkent since 1951.
