= Avadan, Dagestan =

Avadan Авадан
- Village
- Location within Republic of Dagestan Location within Russia
- Coordinates: 41°56′N 48°20′E
- Country: Russia
- Region: Dagestan
- District: Dokuzparinsky District
- Time zone: UTC+3:00

Avadan (Russian: Авадан) is a rural locality (a selo) in Dokuzparinsky District, Dagestan, Russia. The population was 2894 as of 2018. There are 44 streets.

== Geography ==
The village is located on the Rubas River, 89 km northeast of Usukhchay (the district's administrative centre) by road. Arablyar is the nearest rural locality.
