= Demirar =

Demirar Демирар
- Selo
- Location within Republic of Dagestan Location within Russia
- Coordinates: 41°23′N 47°54′E
- Country: Russia
- Region: Republic of Dagestan
- District: Dokuzparinsky District
- Time zone: UTC+3:00

Demirar (Russian: Демирар) is a rural locality (a selo) in Kilersky Selsoviet, Dokuzparinsky District, Republic of Dagestan, Russia. The population was 103 as of 2010.

== Geography ==
Demirar is located 5 km southwest of Usukhchay (the district's administrative centre) by road. Kavalar and Chuvalar are the nearest rural localities.
