= Kaladzhukh, Republic of Dagestan =

Kaladzhukh Каладжух Къалажух
- Selo
- Location within Republic of Dagestan Location within Russia
- Coordinates: 41°21′N 47°54′E
- Country: Russia
- Region: Republic of Dagestan
- District: Dokuzparinsky District
- Time zone: UTC+3:00

Kaladzhukh (Russian: Каладжух; Lezgian: Къалажух) is a rural locality (a selo) in Dokuzparinsky District, Republic of Dagestan, Russia. The population was 1,758 as of 2010. There are 6 streets.

== Geography ==
Kaladzhukh is located 9 km south of Usukhchay (the district's administrative centre) by road. Mikrakh and Kiler are the nearest rural localities.
