= Gandurar =

Gandurar Гандурар Гъвандзурар
- Selo
- Location within Republic of Dagestan Location within Russia
- Coordinates: 41°23′N 47°54′E
- Country: Russia
- Region: Republic of Dagestan
- District: Dokuzparinsky District
- Time zone: UTC+3:00

Gandurar (Russian: Гандурар; Lezgian: Гъвандзурар) is a rural locality (a selo) in Kilersky Selsoviet, Dokuzparinsky District, Republic of Dagestan, Russia. The population was 39 as of 2010.

== Geography ==
Gandurar is located 6 km southwest of Usukhchay (the district's administrative centre) by road. Kiler and Esetar are the nearest rural localities.
