= Novy Usur =

Novy Usur Новый Усур Цӏийи Усур
- Selo
- Location within Republic of Dagestan Location within Russia
- Coordinates: 41°41′N 47°21′E
- Country: Russia
- Region: Republic of Dagestan
- District: Akhtynsky District
- Time zone: UTC+3:00

Novy Usur (Russian: Новый Усур; Lezgian: Цӏийи Усур) is a rural locality (a selo) in Lutkunsky Selsoviet, Akhtynsky District, Republic of Dagestan, Russia. The population was 910 as of 2010. There are 4 streets.

== Geography ==
Novy Usur is located 74 km northeast of Akhty (the district's administrative centre) by road. Gogaz is the nearest rural locality.
