= Khkem =

Khkem Хкем
- Selo
- Location within Republic of Dagestan Location within Russia
- Coordinates: 41°28′N 47°45′E
- Country: Russia
- Region: Republic of Dagestan
- District: Akhtynsky District
- Time zone: UTC+3:00

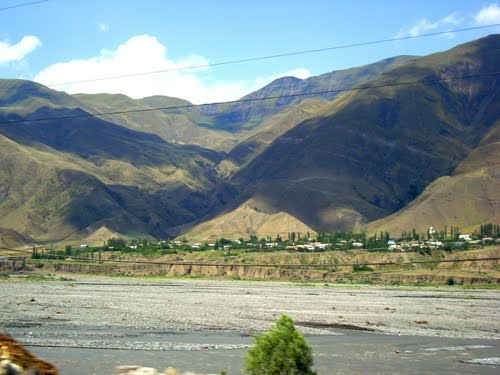
Khekem village

Khkem (Russian: Хкем) is a rural locality (a selo) in Akhtynsky Selsoviet, Akhtynsky District, Republic of Dagestan, Russia. The population was 406 as of 2010. There are 8 streets.

== Geography ==
Khkem is located 4 km northeast of Akhty (the district's administrative centre) by road. Akhty is the nearest rural locality.
