= Novoye Karakyure =

Novoye Karakyure Новое Каракюре ЦIийи Къара Куьре
- Selo
- Location within Republic of Dagestan Location within Russia
- Coordinates: 41°26′N 47°56′E
- Country: Russia
- Region: Republic of Dagestan
- District: Dokuzparinsky District
- Time zone: UTC+3:00

Novoye Karakyure (Russian: Новое Каракюре; Lezgian: ЦIийи Къара Куьре) is a rural locality (a selo) in Dokuzparinsky District, Republic of Dagestan, Russia. The population was 850 as of 2010. There are 21 streets.

== Geography ==
Novoye Karakyure is located 4 km northeast of Usukhchay (the district's administrative centre) by road. Stary Gaptsakh and Usukhchay are the nearest rural localities.

== Nationalities ==
Lezgins live there.
