= Kaluk, Republic of Dagestan =

Kaluk Калук
- Selo
- Location within Republic of Dagestan Location within Russia
- Coordinates: 41°28′N 47°39′E
- Country: Russia
- Region: Republic of Dagestan
- District: Akhtynsky District
- Time zone: UTC+3:00

Kaluk (Russian: Калук) is a rural locality (a selo) in Akhtynsky District, Republic of Dagestan, Russia. The population was 1,240 as of 2012. There are 3 streets.

== Geography ==
Kaluk is located 9 km west of Akhty (the district's administrative centre) by road. Lutkun is the nearest rural locality.
