= Midzhakh =

Midzhakh Миджах Мичагь
- Selo
- Location within Republic of Dagestan Location within Russia
- Coordinates: 41°23′N 47°38′E
- Country: Russia
- Region: Republic of Dagestan
- District: Akhtynsky District
- Time zone: UTC+3:00

Midzhakh (Russian: Миджах; Lezgian: Мичагь) is a rural locality (a selo) in Smugulsky Selsoviet, Akhtynsky District, Republic of Dagestan, Russia. The population was 154 as of 2010.

== Geography ==
Midzhakh is located 12 km southwest of Akhty (the district's administrative centre) by road. Smugul is the nearest rural locality.
