= Kavalar =

Kavalar Кавалар Кьвалар
- Selo
- Location within Republic of Dagestan Location within Russia
- Coordinates: 41°24′N 47°54′E
- Country: Russia
- Region: Republic of Dagestan
- District: Dokuzparinsky District
- Time zone: UTC+3:00

Kavalar (Russian: Кавалар; Lezgian: Кьвалар) is a rural locality (a selo) in Kilersky Selsoviet, Dokuzparinsky District, Republic of Dagestan, Russia. The population was 129 as of 2010. There are 2 streets.

== Geography ==
Kavalar is located 3 km south of Usukhchay (the district's administrative centre) by road. Demirar and Chuvalar are the nearest rural localities.

== Nationalities ==
Lezgins live there.
