= Ukhul =

Ukhul Ухул Ыгыл
- Selo
- Location within Republic of Dagestan Location within Russia
- Coordinates: 41°21′N 47°44′E
- Country: Russia
- Region: Republic of Dagestan
- District: Akhtynsky District
- Time zone: UTC+3:00

Ukhul (Russian: Ухул; Lezgian: Ыгыл) was a rural locality (a selo) in Akhtynsky District, Republic of Dagestan, Russia. The population was 706 as of 2010.

== Geography ==
Ukhul is located 17 km south of Akhty (the district's administrative centre) by road, on the Muglakhchay River. Kurukal is the nearest rural locality.
