= Khryug =

Khryug Хрюг (Russian) Хуьруьг (Lezgian)
- Selo
- Location within Republic of Dagestan Location within European Russia Location within Russia
- Coordinates: 41°29′N 47°36′E
- Country: Russia
- Region: Republic of Dagestan
- District: Akhtynsky District
- Time zone: UTC+3:00

Khryug (Russian: Хрюг; Lezgian: Хуьруьг) is a rural locality (a selo) in Khryugsky Selsoviet, Akhtynsky District, Republic of Dagestan, Russia. The population was 2,241 as of 2010. There are 4 streets.

== Geography ==
Khryug is located 14 km northwest of Akhty (the district's administrative centre) by road. Kaka is the nearest rural locality.
