= Gdynk =

Gdynk Гдынк Къутунхъар
- Selo
- Location within Republic of Dagestan Location within Russia
- Coordinates: 41°27′N 47°39′E
- Country: Russia
- Region: Republic of Dagestan
- District: Akhtynsky District
- Time zone: UTC+3:00

Gdynk (Russian: Гдынк; Lezgian: Къутунхъар) is a rural locality (a selo) in Akhtynsky Selsoviet, Akhtynsky District, Republic of Dagestan, Russia. The population was 400 as of 2010.

== Geography ==
Gdynk is located 15 km west of Akhty (the district's administrative centre) by road. Kaluk is the nearest rural locality.
