= Kaka, Republic of Dagestan =

Kaka Кака Кьакӏар
- Selo
- Location within Republic of Dagestan Location within Russia
- Coordinates: 41°28′N 47°38′E
- Country: Russia
- Region: Republic of Dagestan
- District: Akhtynsky District
- Time zone: UTC+3:00

Kaka (Russian: Кака; Lezgian: Кьакӏар) is a rural locality (a selo) in Akhtynsky District, Republic of Dagestan, Russia. The population was 1,667 as of 2012. There are 6 streets.

== Geography ==
Kaka is located 11 km west of Akhty (the district's administrative centre) by road. Kaluk is the nearest rural locality.
