= Jeyranbatan reservoir =

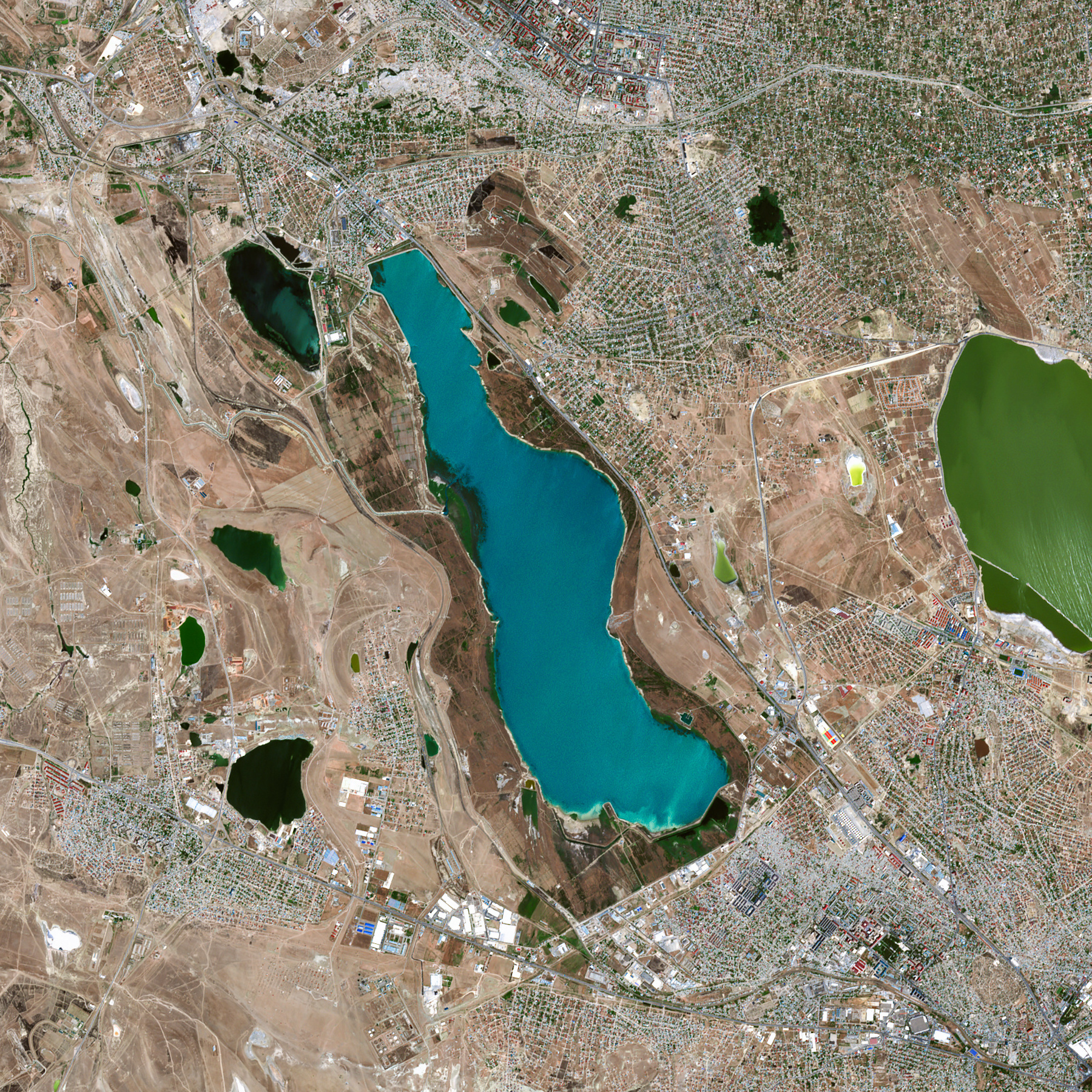
- Satellite photo of the lake

- Location within Azerbaijan
- Location: Baku, Absheron Rayon, Azerbaijan
- Coordinates: 40°30′24″N 49°41′04″E
- Type: reservoir
- Primary inflows: Samur-Absheron channel
- Basin countries: Azerbaijan
- Max. length: 8.74 km (5.43 mi)
- Max. width: 2.15 km (1.34 mi)
- Surface area: 13.9 km^{2} (5.4 sq mi)
- Average depth: 14.5 m (48 ft)
- Max. depth: 28.5 m (94 ft)
- Water volume: 186 million cubic metres (151,000 acre⋅ft)
- Shore length^{1}: 23.3 km (14.5 mi)
- ^{1} Shore length is not a well-defined measure.

Jeyranbatan reservoir (Azerbaijani: Jeyranbatan su anbarı) is a reservoir in the Absheron Rayon in eastern part of Azerbaijan. It is located between Baku and Sumgayit cities (today an official territory of Baku), next to Ceyranbatan settlement. In Azerbaijani language, Jeyranbatan means "the place where the gazelle has drowned" which refers to an ancient legend related to the naming of the city of Sumgayit.

== Overview ==
The reservoir was built in 1958 in order to provide drinking water to the increasing population of Baku and Sumgayit. The overall area is 13.9 km^{2} (5.4 sq mi), the volume of the reservoir is 186 million m^{3}, 150 million m^{3} is utilized. The length of the reservoir is 8.74 km (5.43 mi), maximum width is 2.15 km (1.34 mi), the shoreline length is 23.3 km (14.5 mi). The maximum depth of water in the reservoir is 28.5 m (94 ft) with the lowest depth registered at 14.5 m (48 ft). The water surface area is 1,389 ha (13.89 km^{2}). The reservoir gets the water from Samur-Absheron channel which is fed by three inflowing rivers Samurçay, Vəlvələçay and Qudiyalçay. Due to containment of drinking water, a sanitary protection zone was founded around the reservoir in 1960. In 2001, the first sanitary zone was expanded and fenced off for protection of the reservoir lake. The project also included foresting and cleaning of water channels in order to improve the ecology of the lake. The fence is 23 km (14 mi) long. The reservoir also has two sets of big water pumping stations.

== History ==
The reservoir was built on the basis of a project created at the beginning of the 20th century by the English engineer William Lindley. The main idea of the project was the transfer of water from the Samur River to the reservoir, where the water was to be cleaned and delivered to the cities. Only half a century later, work began on the basis of this project. First, the Samur-Dyavachi channel was extended to the Absheron Peninsula. At the same time, a reservoir with a volume of 186 million cubic meters was created in place of the lakes, Devyayatagy and Jeyranbatan and in 1957 reservoir filling began. In the same year, a complex of water treatment plants was built. The first installation of the complex was commissioned in 1961, the second in 1966, and the third in 1978. After putting the second and third plants into operation, the water supply of Sumgayit, Baki villages and the eastern part of the capital was significantly improved. In 1998–2002, overhaul of water treatment plants was carried out. As part of the repair, the first and second installations were reconstructed.

== See also ==
- Rivers and lakes in Azerbaijan
- Mingachevir reservoir
- Shamkir reservoir
