= Samur–Absheron channel =

Samur-Absheron Channel
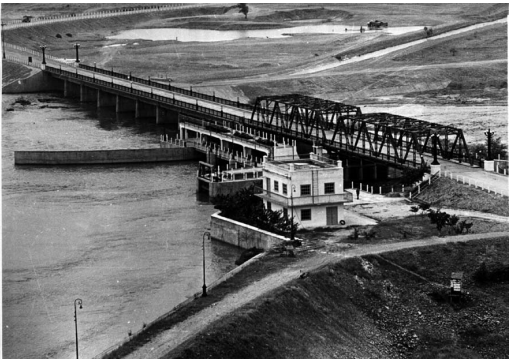
- Native name: Samur-Abşeron kanalı (Azerbaijani)

Location
- Country: Azerbaijan
- Region: Caucasus
- Districts: Qusar; Khachmaz; Davachi; Khizi; Absheron

Physical characteristics
- Source: Greater Caucasus
  - location: Qaleysuvar Mount, Samurçay, Khachmaz Rayon, Azerbaijan
  - coordinates: 41°38′10″N 48°25′9″E
- Mouth: Caspian Sea
  - location: Jeyranbatan reservoir, Absheron Rayon, Azerbaijan
  - coordinates: 40°30′20″N 49°40′28″E
- Length: 195 km (121 mi)
- Discharge
  - location: downstream into Jeyranbatan reservoir
  - average: 55 m^{3}/s (1,900 cu ft/s)

Basin features
- River system: Samur River

Samur–Absheron channel (Azerbaijani: Samur-Abşeron kanalı) is an irrigation channel in Azerbaijan flowing from Russia-Azerbaijan border to the Jeyranbatan reservoir.

== Overview ==
Samur–Absheron channel starts near the Qaleysuvar Mountain in Khachmaz Rayon and flows to the south until it discharges into the Jeyranbatan reservoir. Its length is 195 km (121 mi). The first section (Samur-Devechi) of the channel which ends intersecting Ataçay river is 110 km (68 mi) and was built in 1940 for irrigation purposes. The second 85 km (53 mi) section starts from Ataçay and ends at Jeyranbatan reservoir. Its construction was completed in 1956. Until 1953, the channel was named Joseph Stalin channel. In the recent years, the channel was extended for 72 km (45 mi) from Jeyranbatan reservoir to deep into Absheron Peninsula and was called Main Absheron Channel. Samur–Absheron channel has over 350hydro-technical structures and two pumping stations handling the flow of water. One of them is located in Hacı Zeynalabdin settlement near Sumgayit. It was previously called "Nasosny" (translated as "pumping station" in Russian language). According to information from 1986, the irrigation basin of the channel was 100,000 ha (1,000 km^{2}). The channel also provides drinking water to Baku and Sumgayit.

== See also ==
- Rivers and lakes in Azerbaijan
