= Lakzan =

Medieval Lezgin kingdom

Kingdom of Lakz Лакзан
- 5th century AD–16th century AD
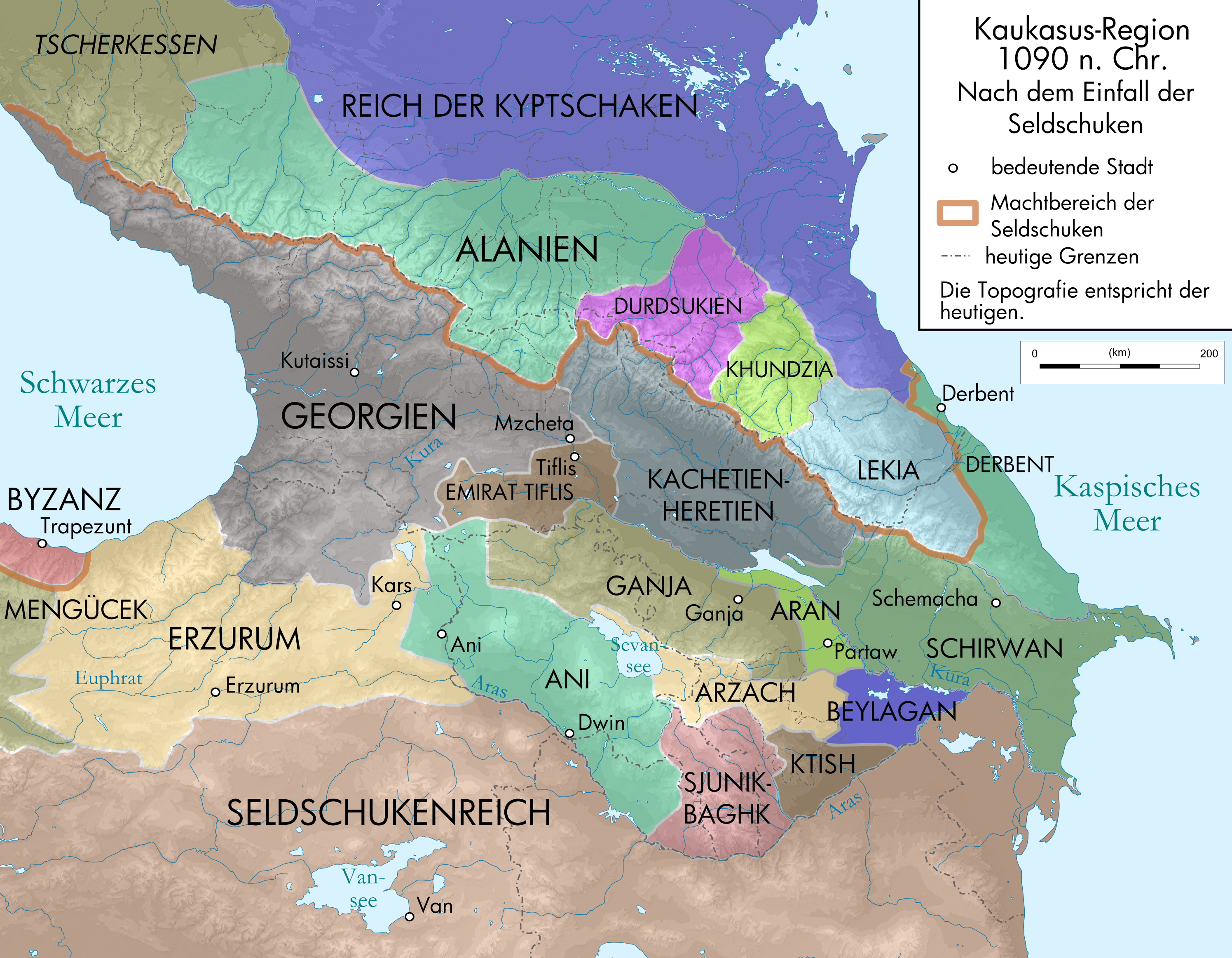
- Lakzan in 11th-12th century (labeled as "Lekia")
- Status: Feudal State
- Capital: Bilistan (Presumably Akhty or Kuysun) later Tsakhur
- Official languages: Lezgic languages, primarily Lezgi
- Religion: Lezgi Paganism (before 8th century) then Islam
- Demonym: Lakzi

Government
  - Jurshanshah: Arbis Ibn Basbas
- Historical era: Post-classical
  - Gained independence from Caucasian Albania: 5th century AD
  - Disintegrated into several free societies: 16th century AD
Preceded by
Caucasian Albania
Succeeded by
Tabasaran Principality
Elisu Sultanate
Rutul Federation
Samur Emirate
- Today part of: Azerbaijan Dagestan

Lakzan, also known as Kingdom of Lakzan, Lakz, or Lekia (Lezgian: Лакз, Russian: Лакз) was a medieval feudal kingdom that existed from the 5th century AD to 16th century AD, located in the Samur River basin in southern Dagestan occupying the area inhabited by the Lezgic-speaking peoples, bordering Maskut in the east, Shirvan in the south. Lakzan emerged as a regional power during the early medieval period and came into military and political contact with neighboring states and empires Medieval Arabic sources referred to the region as the "Land of Lakz" ("Bilad Lakz").

== History ==
Lakzan was situated in the mountainous regions of southern Dagestan and the surrounding territories. Its rulers controlled vast numbers of settlements and territories along important routes connecting the Caucasus with the Caspian coast.

During the early medieval period, Lakzan came into contact with the Umayyad Caliphate and later the Abbasid Caliphate, during the Arab campaigns the 8th-century Lakz king Arbis Ibn Basbas resisted the campaign of the Arab commander Marwan ibn Muhammed.

Lakz was also closely connected with neighboring states of Derbent and Shirvan. The Shirvanshahs occupied the territory of both eastern and western Lakz and collected tribute (Kharaj) during the reign of Fariburz I. Medieval geographical sources continued to use Lakz for the lands of its inhabitants. The 11th-century scholar Mammus al Lakzi, for example was described originating from "Bilad Lakz".

By the late medieval period Lakz was no longer a unified kingdom and disintegrated into several smaller Dagestani principalities and free societies.

== Society ==
=== Lakzian Language ===
Medieval Arabic and Persian geographical writings divided the languages of the eastern Caucasus into two groups: the Arranian language (al-Arrāniyya), associated with Caucasian Albania, and the Lakzan languages (al-Lakzāniyya), associated with the Kingdom of Lakz. This division recurs throughout the geographical literature of the 10th century and later, even as individual authors differed on the exact territorial extent each language covered.

Arabic authors such as al-Istakhri, Ibn Hawqal and al-Muqaddasi refer to Arranian in the singular, but consistently use the plural (lughāt) of the Lakzan languages. A.K. Alikberov argues that this reflects a genuine distinction: the element -ān is a Middle Persian plural suffix, and Arabic accordingly produced both a singular form (Lakz, adjective al-lakziyya) and a plural form (Lakzān), so that al-lughāt al-lakzāniyya denoted not a single language but the whole group of related languages spoken in the region.

Modern comparative linguistics identifies the languages historically covered by the Lakzan category with the Lezgic languages branch of the Northeast Caucasian family, drawing on the internal classification of that family established by comparative linguists. Alikberov identifies the ancestral forms of Lezgian, Tabasaran, Aghul, Rutul, Tsakhur, Kryts and Budukh, and possibly Khinaluq, as belonging to the Lakzan group, with the ancestor of modern Lezgian (Proto-Lezgian) as its principal member, spoken across much of southern Dagestan and north-eastern Azerbaijan. The differentiation of Proto-Lezgian is placed by Kassian's lexicostatistical classification in the 2nd millennium BCE, with a provisional date of 1720 BCE.

Within this classification, Kassian identifies two early-splitting outliers, Udi (together with Caucasian Albanian) and Archi, with the remaining Samur languages dividing further into western (Tsakhur, Rutul), southern (Kryts, Budukh) and eastern (Lezgian, Tabasaran, Aghul) branches. This scheme corresponds broadly to the Arabic sources' distinction between Arranian and Lakzan, with the Udi–Caucasian Albanian branch answering to the former and the Samur languages to the latter.

Alikberov proposes that communication across the linguistically diverse territories in the Caucasian Albania and Lakzan rested on a dialect and language continuum rather than on a single koine: neighbouring communities along the perimeter of contact understood one another relatively well, while more distant groups faced a language barrier. Within this model, he suggests that the main Lakzan language may have functioned as an everyday commercial lingua franca, or "bazaar language", complementing the written Caucasian Albanian used in liturgical and partly administrative contexts. On this view, the two languages occupied complementary registers rather than competing for the same social function, with the literary language serving the church and administration and the bazaar language serving trade.

The argument rests chiefly on the name of the market of Barda, recorded by al-Istakhri and Ibn Hawqal as al-Kurkiyū. Alikberov derives the first element from Greek kyriakē ("the Lord's day") and reads the second as Lezgian yugh ("day"), comparing the modern Lezgian designation of Sunday as bazar yugh; he presents the reading as suggestive rather than conclusive, since it turns on the interpretation of a single syllable. He further observes that the market itself drew traders from a wide area, as far as Iraq, which he argues made a common commercial idiom a practical necessity regardless of which language ultimately supplied its name.

A more direct attestation concerns the written use of a Lakzan language. At the turn of the 11th and 12th centuries a Madrasa al-Nizamiyya was founded at Zahur (modern Tsakhur), by then the capital of Lakz, where, according to the reports of Yaqut al-Hamawi and Zakariya al-Qazwini, Arabic Muslim works — including texts on Islamic jurisprudence (fiqh) — were translated into the Lakzan language.

=== Social Classes ===
Byzantine scholar Yaqut al-Hamawi, in his article on al-Bab, describes the social hierarchy of the Lakz as:

They-have freemen (ahrar) who are called khamāshira, above them are the maliks and below them the officers and then the ploughmen (akara) and the servants or craftsmen (Muhhān)

== List of Identified Rulers ==
- Shergir - 4th century (identified more as a King of the Leks)
- Sabas - 7th century
- Urbis - before 730
- Arbis Ibn Basbas- 730-1738
- Khashram Ahmad- 10th century

== Bibliography ==
- Minorsky, Vladimir (1958). A History of Sharvān and Darband in the 10th–11th Centuries. Cambridge: W. Heffer & Sons.
- Alikberov, A. K. (2015). "Peoples and Languages of Caucasian Albania. On the Language Continuum as an Alternative to a Koine. The Language of Writing and the "Bazaar Language"". Albania Caucasica (I). Moscow: Institute of Oriental Studies, Russian Academy of Sciences; Institute of History, Archaeology and Ethnography, Dagestan Scientific Center, Russian Academy of Sciences: 81–116.
- Qazwini, Zakariya ibn Muhammad (1847). Wüstenfeld, F. (ed.). Kitāb Āthār al-Bilād wa-Akhbār al-ʿIbād. Göttingen. p. 405.
