= Rutul Federation =

Rutul Free Society (7th century-1839)

Rutul Free Society
- 7th century–1839
- Map of Rutul Federation and other Samur societies
- Status: Monarchy
- Capital: Rutul
- Common languages: Rutul
- Religion: Sunni Islam
- Bek
  - (1574–1601): Gazibek
  - (1626–1635): Ibragimkhan
  - (19th century): Hasankhan
- History
  - Established: 7th century
  - Incorporated into the Russian Empire: 1839
Preceded by	Succeeded by
Lakzan	Russian Empire
- Today part of: Dagestan

The Rutul Federation or The Rutul Free Society is a Rutul state located in Southern Dagestan and was formed in the 7th century.

Rutuls experienced strong cultural and linguistic pressure from Azerbaijanis and to a lesser extent from Lezghins.

Before the annexation by the Russian Empire, the Rutuls made a federation of multiple rural communities which were known as the "Rutul Magal". This Magal was ruled by a Bek, a permanent leader. These Beks address important issues and are required to convene to a popular assembly.

In the 17th century, the Rutul Federation included Tsakhur villages and captured some Lezgin villages. They did lose two Rutul villages to the Gazikumukh Khanate and two more to the Akhty-para. This free society consisted of Rutul and Lezgi villages and was one of the largest free societies, along with Akhty-para, Alty-para and Dokuz-para free societies.

== History ==
In 1536, Rutul attacked Akhty, which was the stronghold of the Safavid power in southern Dagestan. In 1541, Akhty attacked Rutul with the support of the Derbent Khanate. In 1542, Rutul, with the support of the Quba Khanate, again attacked Akhty. In 1574, Gazibek became the leader of the federation.

His name was mentioned several times: in 1588, the Turkish Sultan Murad III wrote a letter to Gazibek, congratulating him on gaining leadership over the federation. In 1598, Shah Abbas offered Gazibek assistance for the Tsakhur ruler Mahmedbek.

There is evidence that already at the end of the 16th century, the Rutul beks had connections with the governments of neighboring countries. It is possible that the Rutul Free Society already existed at that time, as a political association of a significant part of the Rutulians.

One of the confirmations of the ancient age of the Rutul Free Society is a letter from the Tarkov shamkhal to Tsar Fedor Ivanovich dated 1598, in which the Rutul and Khnov troops are mentioned among the allied shamkhal troops.

== Beks ==
- Gazibek (1574–1601)
- Ibragimkhan (1626–1635)
- Hasankhan (19th century)
