= Yaşıl Dərə =

Yaşıl Dərə Yaşıl Dərə
- Location within Azerbaijan
- Coordinates: 40°33′25″N 49°40′18″E
- Country: Azerbaijan
- Rayon: Sumgait
- Time zone: UTC+4 (AZT)
  - Summer (DST): UTC+5 (AZT)

Yaşıl Dərə or Yaşıldərə is a residential area on the outskirts of Sumgait city in Azerbaijan, consisting of slums and garden plots.

== History and development ==
The settlement extends southward to Ceyranbatan and eastward toward Saray settlement. Bordered to the north by Sumgait’s neighborhoods and microdistricts, initial habitation in the area began in the 1990s, though the construction boom intensified primarily from the mid-2000s onward. Today, the area is one of the key zones addressing the housing needs of Sumgait’s urban population. According to Sumgait’s Master Plan drafted in 2013, the Yaşıl Dərə area was designated as one of the city’s primary expansion zones.

== See also ==
- Sumgait
