= Tekipirkent =

Tekipirkent Текипиркент Такипир
- Selo
- Location within Republic of Dagestan Location within Russia
- Coordinates: 41°20′N 47°53′E
- Country: Russia
- Region: Republic of Dagestan
- District: Dokuzparinsky District
- Time zone: UTC+3:00

Tekipirkent (Russian: Текипиркент; Lezgian: Такипир) is a rural locality (a selo) in Mikrakhsky Selsoviet, Dokuzparinsky District, Republic of Dagestan, Russia. The population was 282 as of 2010. There are 2 streets.

== Geography ==
Tekipirkent is located 13 km southwest of Usukhchay (the district's administrative centre) by road. Kaladzhukh and Mikrakh are the nearest rural localities.
