= List of Lezgins =

This is a partial list of notable Lezgin people.

== Military personnel ==
=== 13th–19th century ===
- Safi Khan Lezgi, Lezgin nobleman and official in the Safavid Empire, governor of Erivan Province from 1666 to 1674.
- Fath-Ali Khan Daghestani, Lezgin nobleman who served as the Grand Vizier of the Safavid Shah Soltan Hoseyn from 1716 to 1720.
- Haji Davud Mushkurvi, Lezgin imam was a prominent 18th-century Lezgin military-religious leader, Sunni scholar, and the first Imam of the Caucasus. He led a major national liberation movement against the Safavid Empire.
- Sheikh Muhammad Yarguvi, was a Lezgin imam, founder of Muridism in the Caucasus and teacher of all imams of Dagestan and Chechnya. Legendary Khas Muhammad Huluhvi and Imam Shamil was his the most famous student.
- Khas Muhammad Huluhvi, Lezgin imam and military leader during the Russo-Caucasian War. Leader of the uprisings in Quba in 1837–1839.
- Ali Hilivi, Lezgin abrek of the uprisings in Quba in 1837–1839.
- Mushab-Ali Kuzunvi, Lezgin imam and military leader, Leader of the uprisings in Qusar in 1930.
- Haddam Chakarvi, Lezgin abrek of the uprisings in Quba in 1930
- Gazi Muhammad Shtulvi, Lezgin imam and military leader, Leader of the uprisings in Shtul in 1930.
- Abdullah Kirivi, legendary Lezgin folk hero and abrek
- Mahmud Shtulvi, Lezgin abrek
- Arbis Ibn Basbas, King of the medieval Lezgin kingdom of Lakzan

=== World War II ===
- Erzi (Araz) Kazimagomedovich Aliyev, Red army sniper, Hero of the Soviet Union
- Valid (Valentin) Allahyarovich Emirov, Soviet pilot, captain, Hero of the Soviet Union

== Politicians ==
=== Soviet Union ===
- Magomed Khuseynov (Mikhail Lezgintsev), general

=== Russian Federation ===
- Selimgerey (Sergey) Alimovich Melikov, Head of the Dagestan Republic

=== Republic of Türkiye ===
- Mehmet Recep Peker, 6th prime minister of the Republic of Turkey

== Business ==
- Suleyman Kerimov, Lezgin entrepreneur and businessman
- Sayfuddin Rustamov, Lezgin entrepreneur and businessman

== Sports ==
=== Footballers ===
- Serder Serderov, former professional footballer

=== Wrestlers ===
- Magomed Kurugliyev, freestyle wrestler who competed in the 1996 Summer Olympics, in the 2000 Summer Olympics, and in the 2004 Summer Olympics.
- Dauren Kurugliev, freestyle wrestler, 3x European champion and a 2024 Olympic bronze medalist.
- Shamil Mamedov, freestyle wrestler who wrestles in the 65 kg category on the international circuit.

=== Boxers ===
- Khabib Allakhverdiev, professional boxer

=== Mixed martial artists ===
- Ikram Aliskerov, currently competing in the UFC

=== Weightlifters ===
- Ismail Gadzhibekov, weightlifter, 4x champion and two-time silver medalist of the Russian Championships

=== Judo practitioners ===
- Nazim Huseynov

== Writers and poets ==
=== Writers ===
- Sayfullah Kurahvi, writer and poet

=== Poets ===
- Muhammad-Amin Yaltsugvi, poet
- Suleyman Stalvi, poet. Russian writer Maxim Gorky described him as "Homer of 20th century".
- Said Kochkhurvi, poet.

== Scientists ==
=== Historians ===
- Hasan Alqadarvi
- Amri Shikhsaidov
