= Mikrakh =

Mikrakh Микрах Миграгъ
- Selo
- Location within Republic of Dagestan Location within Russia
- Coordinates: 41°22′N 47°53′E
- Country: Russia
- Region: Republic of Dagestan
- District: Dokuzparinsky District
- Time zone: UTC+3:00

Mikrakh (Russian: Микрах; Lezgian: Миграгъ) is a rural locality (a selo) and the administrative centre of Mikrakhsky Selsoviet, Dokuzparinsky District, Republic of Dagestan, Russia. The population was 1,259 as of 2010. There are 4 streets.

== Geography ==
Mikrakh is located 8 km southwest of Usukhchay (the district's administrative centre) by road. Kaladzhukh and Kiler are the nearest rural localities.
