= Arbis Ibn Basbas =

- Jurshanshah

King of Lakzan
- Reign: 730–739 CE
- Born: Late 7th century or early 8th century (estimated)
- Died: 739 CE
- Father: Urbis
- Religion: Lezgic Paganism

Arbis Ibn Basbas was an 8th-century ruler of Lakzan, a Lezgian kingdom located in the northeastern Caucasus. He is described by the Arab historian Ibn A'tham al-Kufi as the "King of Lakz" during the invasions of the Umayyad Caliphate led by Marwan ibn Muhammad in the Eastern Caucasus. Arbis is associated with the resistance of Lakz against Marwan's campaigns at the fortress of Bilistan.

== War with the Umayyads ==
Arbis is first recorded in the campaigns of Marwan, who served as the governor of Arminiya and Azerbaijan and conducted a number of military expeditions into the lands of the eastern Caucasus, including Lakzan. According to Ibn A'tham al-Kufi, Marwan arrived in Derbent after one of his campaigns and summoned the rulers of the Mountainous Caucasus to appear before him. The rulers of Shirvan, Layzan, Filan, and Tabasaran all complied with the summons, but Arbis Ibn Basbas refused to appear.

According to one account Arbis Ibn Basbas allied with the Khazar prince Barsbek in 731 and proceeded to chase down the Arab commander Al-Jarrah al Hakami all the way till the city of Ardabil where they ensued in battle, the joint forces of the Lezgins and Khazar's destroyed Jarrah's army and killed him in battle.

In the spring of 738 Marwan decided to lead a campaign into Lakzan. According to al-Kufi, he reached the fortress of Bilistan, located near the middle course of the Samur River. From there, Marwan ordered raids on the settlements of Lakz.

One source states that in one battle Arbis's troops encountered Marwan's general "Al Kawsar" and managed to defeat him, killing him in battle.

== Siege of Bilistan ==
Arbis took refuge in the fortress of Bilistan. Al-Kufi's account states that the Arab forces besieged the fortress while continuing military operations in the surrounding lands. The siege is described as lasting for an extended period, as the Umayyad forces failed to breach the fortress, while the defenders refused to surrender. The medieval account describes Arbis remaining inside Bilistan while Marwan's forces attempted to subdue the fortress. The exact circumstances of the conclusion of the siege and Arbis's fate are less certain than the events explicitly recorded by al-Kufi. One account suggests that Arbis was accidentally shot by a shepherd while attempting to reach the Khazars for assistance against Marwan, although the sources may vary.

== Significance ==
Arbis is one of the earliest rulers of Lakzan whose name is preserved in a detailed account of the Arab invasions. His identification as the "king of Lakz" has been cited as evidence for an organized Lakzan polity under a named ruler. His refusal to answer Marwan's summons and his defense of Bilistan place him among the rulers who resisted Arab expansion in the eastern Caucasus.

== See also ==
- Lakzan
- Marwan ibn Muhammad
- Arab–Khazar wars
- History of Dagestan
- History of Azerbaijan
- Lezgins
