= Dzhaba =

Dzhaba Джаба Чепер
- Selo
- Location within Republic of Dagestan Location within Russia
- Coordinates: 41°25′N 47°46′E
- Country: Russia
- Region: Republic of Dagestan
- District: Akhtynsky District
- Time zone: UTC+3:00

Dzhaba (Russian: Джаба; Lezgian: Чепер) is a rural locality (a selo) in Akhtynsky District, Republic of Dagestan, Russia. The population was 706 as of 2010. There are four streets.

== Geography ==
Dzhaba is located 16 km southeast of Akhty (the district's administrative centre) by road. Miskindzha is the nearest rural locality.
