= Güllük, Azerbaijan =

Güllük
- Municipality
- Location within Azerbaijan Location within Shaki-Zagatala Economic Region
- Coordinates: 41°30′07″N 46°45′08″E
- Country: Azerbaijan
- Rayon: Qakh

Population
  - Total: 2,363
- Time zone: UTC+4 (AZT)
  - Summer (DST): UTC+5 (AZT)

Güllük (also, Gyullyuk) is a village and municipality in the Qakh Rayon of Azerbaijan. It has a population of 2,363.

== See also ==
- Gulluk Mosque
