= Akhtychay =

Akhtychay Ахтычай
- Akhtychay River valley

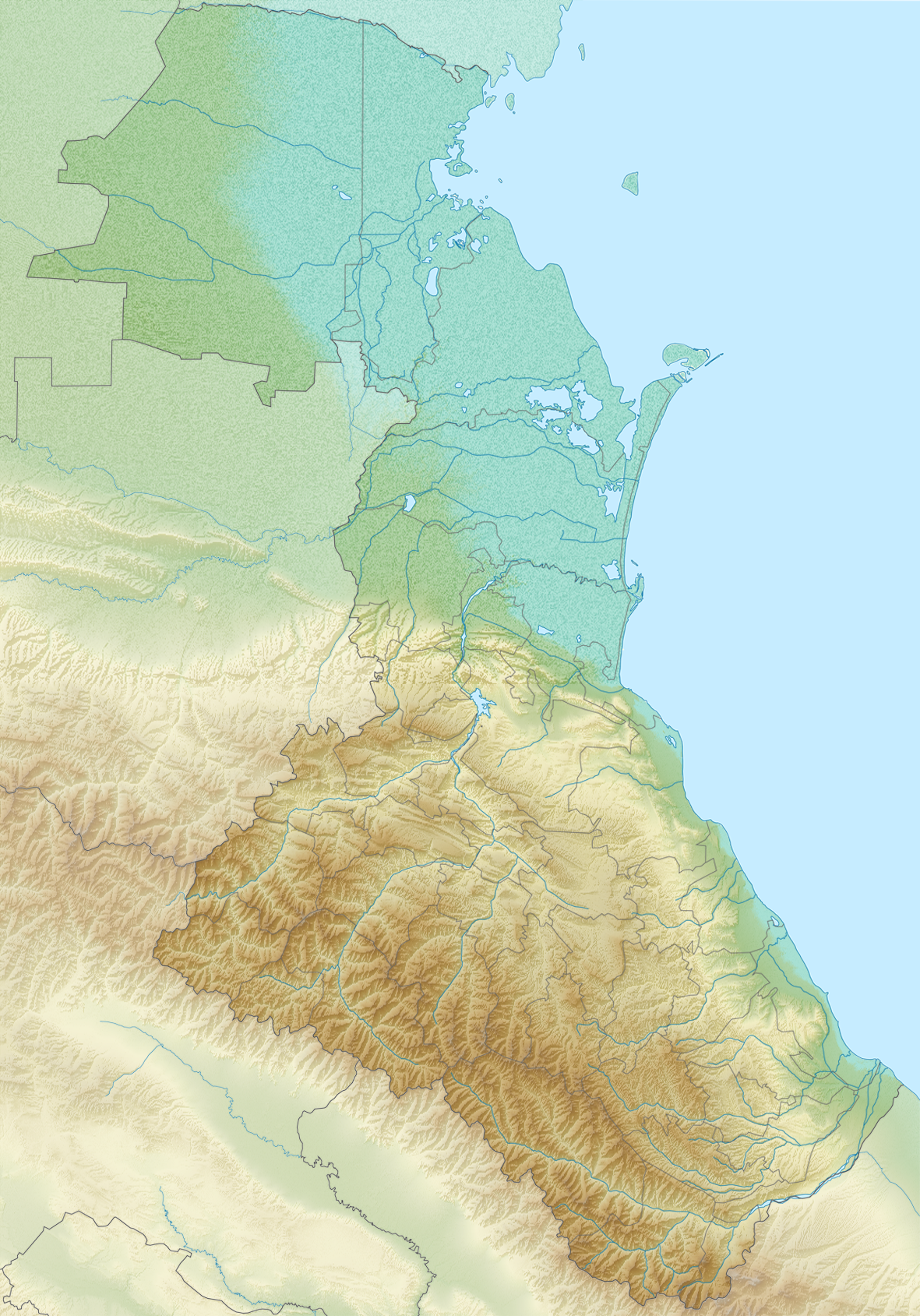
- Location within Republic of Dagestan Location within Caucasus Mountains
- Native name: Ахцегьвацӏ (Lezgian)

Location
- Countries: Russia
- Region: Caucasus
- Districts: Dagestan

Physical characteristics
- Source: Main Caucasian Range
  - location: Rutulsky District, Dagestan, Russia
  - coordinates: 41°28′46″N 47°13′04″E
  - elevation: 3,300 m (10,800 ft)
- Mouth: Samur->Caspian Sea
  - location: Rutulsky District, Dagestan, Russia
  - coordinates: 41°27′50″N 47°44′37″E
- Length: 63 km (39 mi)
- Basin size: 963 km^{2} (372 sq mi)
- Discharge
  - location: downstream from the confluence with the Gdymchay
  - average: 158 m^{3}/s (5,600 cu ft/s)

Akhtychay (Lezgian: Ахцегьвацӏ) is a river in Russia, a right tributary of the Samur. It flows through the Rutulsky and Akhtynsky districts of Dagestan. The river is 63 km long, and its drainage basin covers an area of 963 km².

The elevation of the source is 3,300 m above sea level, while the elevation at the mouth is 1,000 m above sea level. The river has a gradient of 36.5 m/km.

== Geography ==
The Akhtychay River originates from a spring on the northeastern slope of the Main Caucasian Range and flows into the Samur River from the right bank, 101 km from its mouth.

The Akhtychay River is the largest tributary of the Samur River in terms of water discharge. Its drainage basin has an average elevation of 2,590 m, and approximately 84% of the basin lies above 2,000 m.

The river channel is rocky and contains rapids of varying difficulty. The rapids are generally low, ranging from 0.5 to 1 m in height. They are formed mainly by accumulations of boulders and, less frequently, by rock outcrops crossing the channel. In the upper and middle reaches, the banks are low, reaching up to 1 m in height, and consist of sandy-clayey and boulder-and-pebble deposits. In the lower reaches, over the final 26 km, the banks are high. Downstream from the confluence with the Gdymchay, the Akhtychay River flows through a deep gorge. The channel width varies from 2 to 15 m, while its depth ranges from 10 cm to 1.2 m. The average flow velocity is 1–2 m/s, reaching 4–5 m/s in some sections.

== Hydrology ==
Snowmelt, rainfall, and groundwater contribute nearly equally to the river's flow. The distribution of runoff throughout the year is uneven. The river has its highest discharge from May to August, when approximately 60% of the annual runoff occurs. Hazardous hydrological phenomena, including catastrophic floods caused by heavy rainfall and debris flows, occur frequently, as in 1988 and 1997.

The average annual discharge at the river mouth is 15.8 m³/s, with a maximum of 550 m³/s and a minimum of 1.75 m³/s. The river water is highly turbid during floods. In some cases, water turbidity reaches nearly 120,000 g/m³.

== Study of the river and its significance for water management ==
The river's hydrological regime has been monitored at three gauging stations: Khnov, Smugul, and Akhty.

The river is significant for water management. It is used for water supply and irrigation of nearby villages and agricultural fields. The Akhtyn Hydroelectric Power Station has been operating on the river since 1957.
