= Yukhari-Arkhit =

Yukhari-Arkhit Юхари-Архит Вини-АрхитI
- Selo
- Location within Republic of Dagestan Location within Russia
- Coordinates: 41°44′N 47°57′E
- Country: Russia
- Region: Republic of Dagestan
- District: Khasavyurtovsky District
- Time zone: UTC+3:00

Yukhari-Arkhit (Russian: Юхари-Архит; Lezgian: Вини-АрхитI) is a rural locality (a selo) in Ashaga-Arkhitsky Selsoviet, Khivsky District, Republic of Dagestan, Russia. Population: 422 (2010 census); 372 (2002 census); 376 (1989 Soviet census). There are 12 streets.

== Geography ==
Yukhari-Arkhit is located 6 km southeast of Khiv (the district's administrative centre) by road. Ashaga-Arkhit is the nearest rural locality.
