= Gaptsakh =

Gaptsakh Гапцах Гъебцегь
- Selo
- Location within Republic of Dagestan Location within Russia
- Coordinates: 41°40′N 48°22′E
- Country: Russia
- Region: Republic of Dagestan
- District: Magaramkentsky District
- Time zone: UTC+3:00

Gaptsakh (Russian: Гапцах; Lezgian: Гъебцегь) is a rural locality (a selo) in Magaramkentsky District, Republic of Dagestan, Russia. The population was 3,554 as of 2010. There are 23 streets.

== Geography ==
Gaptsakh is located 6 km northeast of Magaramkent (the district's administrative centre) by road. Yarag-Kazmalyar and Gogaz are the nearest rural localities.

== Nationalities ==
Lezgins live there.
