= Miskindzha =

Miskindzha Мискинджа Мискичкар
- Selo
- Location within Republic of Dagestan Location within Russia
- Coordinates: 41°25′N 47°50′E
- Country: Russia
- Region: Republic of Dagestan
- District: Dokuzparinsky District
- Time zone: UTC+3:00

Miskindzha (Russian: Мискинджа; Lezgian: Мискискар) is a rural locality (a selo) in Dokuzparinsky District, Republic of Dagestan, Russia. The population was 3,522 as of 2010. There are 18 streets.

== Geography ==
Miskindzha is located on the right bank of the Samur River, at the northern foot of Shalbuzdag, 7 km west of Usukhchay (the district's administrative centre) by road. Usukhchay and Dzhaba are the nearest rural localities.

== Nationalities ==
Lezgins live there.
