= Gulluk Mosque =

Mosque in Qakh, Azerbaijan

- Azerbaijani: Güllük kənd məscidi; Arabic: مسجد جلك
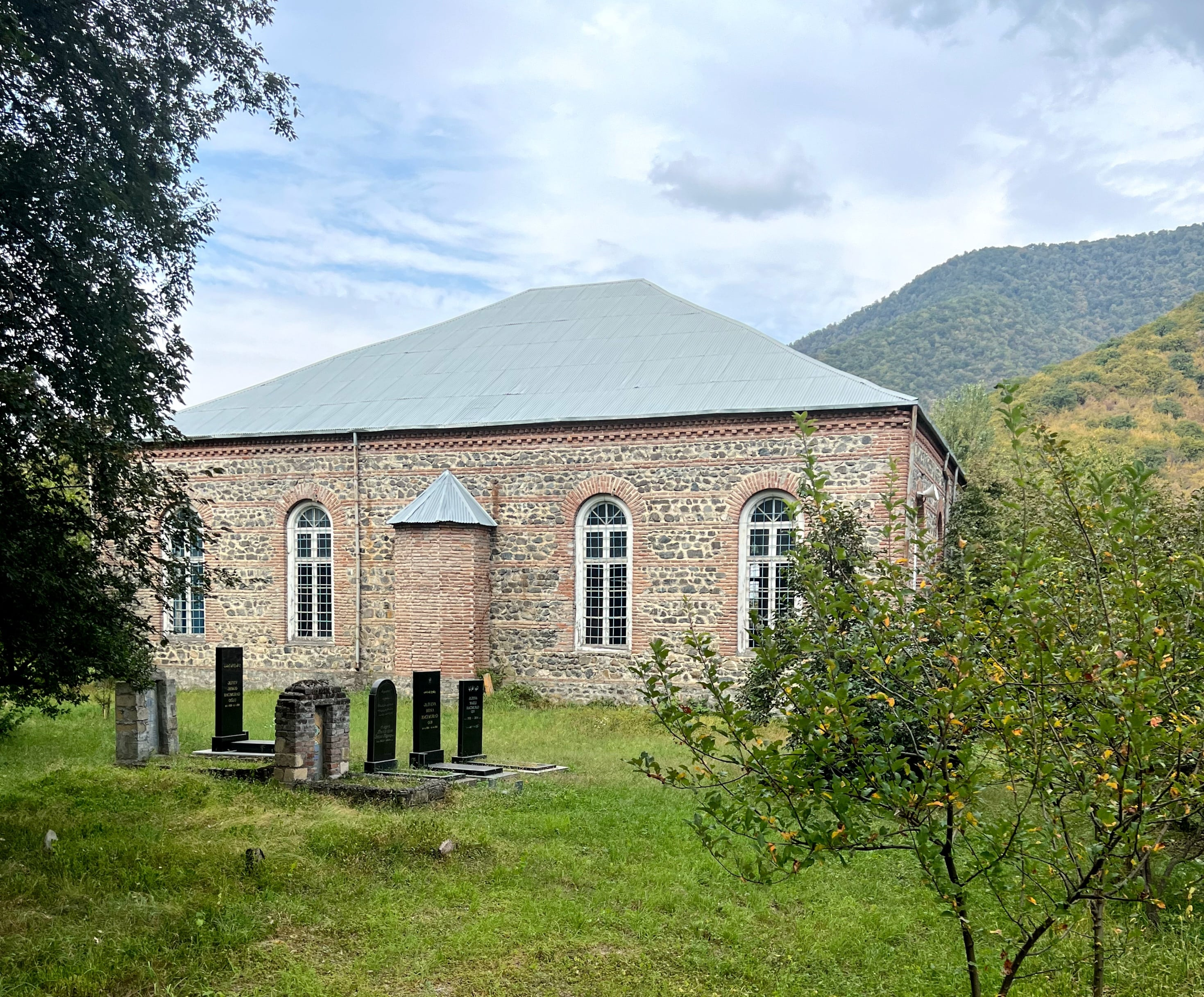
- The mosque in 2024

- Location of the mosque in Azerbaijan

Religion
- Affiliation: Islam
- Ecclesiastical or organizational status: Mosque (1727–1928); Profane use (1928–1992); Mosque (since 1992)
- Status: Active (need repairs)

Location
- Location: Gulluk, Qakh district
- Country: Azerbaijan
- Interactive map of Gulluk Mosque
- Coordinates: 41°29′56″N 46°46′01″E

Architecture
- Type: Mosque architecture
- Completed: 1727

Specifications
- Length: 21.3 m (70 ft)
- Width: 18 m (59 ft)
- Height (max): 5.4 m (18 ft) (interior)

The Gulluk Mosque (Azerbaijani: Güllük kənd məscidi; Arabic: مسجد جلك) also known as the Gulluk Juma Mosque, is a mosque and historical architectural monument, located in the village of Gulluk in the Qakh district of Azerbaijan. Built in 1727, the mosque was included in the list of immovable historical and cultural monuments of local significance by the decision No. 132 of the Cabinet of Azerbaijan on August 2, 2001.

== About ==
The Gulluk Mosque was built in 1727 in the village of Gulluk in Azerbaijan's Qakh district with the support of the local population. An inscription on the mosque's façade provides information about its construction date, stating that it was built in 1139 AH (1726/1727 CE) by Al-Jiniqi.

The mosque has been damaged and restored multiple times. In the 19th century the mosque was restored by master builder Mohammad Eldaroglu from Ilisu. Haji Zeynalabdin Taghiyev provided financial support for the purchase of the mosque's roofing material.

In the mosque's courtyard, there are several graves and a tomb. The Akhund Baba tomb is located in the direction of the qibla. The tomb is open-topped and consists of a square grave. The gravestone is made from river stones. Abbas Efendi, who was active in the region and died in 1704, is also buried here.

After the Soviet occupation in Azerbaijan, an official campaign against religion began in 1928. In December of that year, the Central Committee of the Communist Party of Azerbaijan transferred many mosques, churches, and synagogues to clubs for educational purposes. While there were 3,000 mosques in Azerbaijan in 1917, this number had decreased to 1,700 in 1927, 1,369 in 1928, and only 17 by 1933. During this period, the Gulluk Mosque was also closed for worship and used as a storage facility.

After Azerbaijan regained its independence, the mosque was returned to the faithful in 1992. The mosque was included in the list of immovable historical and cultural monuments of local significance by the decision No. 132 of the Cabinet of Ministers of the Republic of Azerbaijan on August 2, 2001.

Following several earthquakes in the northwestern region of Azerbaijan, in 2020 it was reported that the mosque building fell into a state of disrepair.

== Architecture ==
In the construction of the mosque, lime mortar, river stones, and bricks were used. The building is 21.3 m (70 ft) long, 18 m (59 ft) wide, and 5.4 m (18 ft) high. It has 12 windows, a door, a mihrab, and 8 brick columns. The mosque does not have a minaret. On its porch, there are two columns, and beside them, there are four two-story rooms. The mosque's floor and ceiling are made of wood. The structure is rectangular in shape. The mihrab is simple and stands 4 m (13 ft) high. It also has a three-step wooden minbar.

== See also ==
- Islam in Azerbaijan
- List of mosques in Azerbaijan
