= Tselyagyun =

Tselyagyun Целягюн ЦӀелегуьн
- Selo
- Location within Republic of Dagestan Location within Russia
- Coordinates: 41°39′N 48°17′E
- Country: Russia
- Region: Republic of Dagestan
- District: Magaramkentsky District
- Time zone: UTC+3:00

Tselyagyun (Russian: Целягюн; Lezgian: ЦӀелегуьн) is a rural locality (a selo) in Magaramkentsky District, Republic of Dagestan, Russia. The population was 1,813 as of 2010. There are 17 streets.

== Geography ==
Tselyagyun is located 19 km northwest of Magaramkent (the district's administrative centre) by road, on the left bank of the Samur River. Togaz and Magaramkent are the nearest rural localities.

== Nationalities ==
Lezgins live there.
