= Kuysun =

Kuysun Куйсун Къуюстан
- Selo
- Location within Republic of Dagestan Location within Russia
- Coordinates: 41°34′N 48°17′E
- Country: Russia
- Region: Republic of Dagestan
- District: Magaramkentsky District
- Time zone: UTC+3:00

Kuysun (Russian: Куйсун; Lezgian: Къуюстан) is a rural locality (a selo) in Magaramkentsky District, Republic of Dagestan, Russia. The population was 3,197 as of 2010. There are 34 streets.

== Geography ==
Kuysun is located 188 southeast of Makhachkala. Gilyar and Ledzhet are the nearest rural localities.

== Nationalities ==
Lezgins live there.
