= Yukhari-Stal =

Yukhari-Stal Юхари-Стал Вини Стӏал
- Selo
- Location within Republic of Dagestan Location within Russia
- Coordinates: 41°37′N 48°06′E
- Country: Russia
- Region: Republic of Dagestan
- District: Suleyman-Stalsky District
- Time zone: UTC+3:00

Yukhari-Stal (Russian: Юхари-Стал; Lezgian: Вини Стӏал) is a rural locality (a selo) in Suleyman-Stalsky District, Republic of Dagestan, Russia. Population: 1,643 (2010 census); 1,843 (2002 census); 1,067 (1989 Soviet census). There are 3 streets.

== Geography ==
Yukhari-Stal is located 5 km north of Kasumkent (the district's administrative centre) by road. Orta-Stal is the nearest rural locality.
