= Yukharikartas =

Yukharikartas Юхарикартас Вини Къартас
- Selo
- Location within Republic of Dagestan Location within Russia
- Coordinates: 41°37′N 48°06′E
- Country: Russia
- Region: Republic of Dagestan
- District: Suleyman-Stalsky District
- Time zone: UTC+3:00

Yukharikartas (Russian: Юхарикартас; Lezgian: Вини Къартас) is a rural locality (a selo) in Ullugatagsky Selsoviet, Suleyman-Stalsky District, Republic of Dagestan, Russia. Population: 281 (2010 census); 239 (2002 census); 144 (1989 Soviet census). There are 3 streets.

== Geography ==
Yukharikartas is located 11 km south of Kasumkent (the district's administrative centre) by road. Ashagakartas is the nearest rural locality.
