= Ceyranbatan =

- Village
- Azerbaijani: Ceyranbatan
- Location within Azerbaijan
- Coordinates: 40°32′27″N 49°39′35″E
- Country: Azerbaijan
- District: Absheron

Population (2008)
  - Total: 7,900
- Time zone: UTC+4 (AZT)
  - Summer (DST): UTC+5 (AZT)

Ceyranbatan is a village of Baku. It has a population of 7,900.
