= Mount Shalbuzdag =

Mountain in southern Russia

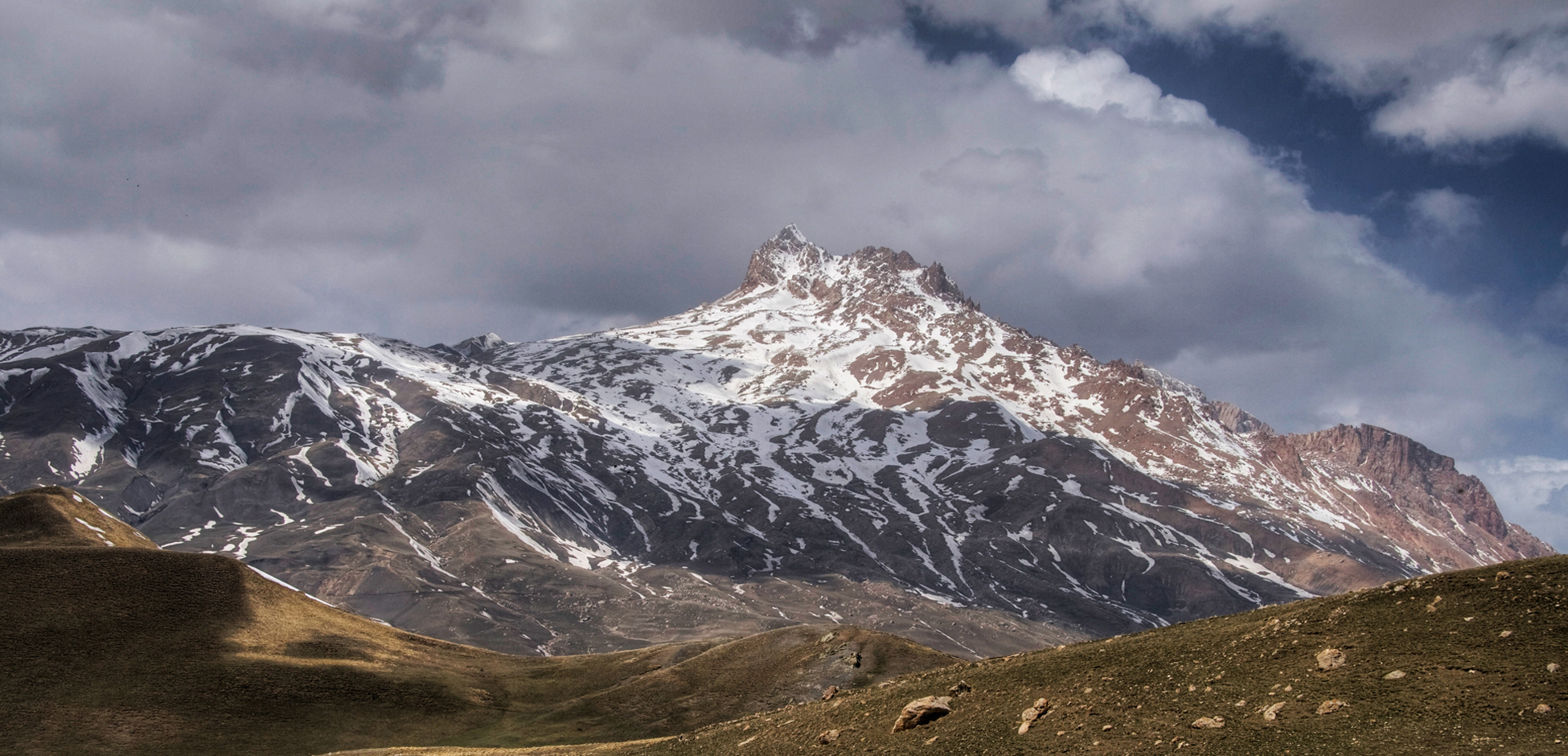
- Mount Shalbuzdag in Akhtynsky and Dokuzparinsky Districts

Highest point
- Elevation: 4,142 m (13,589 ft)
- Prominence: 1,209 m (3,967 ft)
- Listing: Highest peaks of Russia, Ribu
- Coordinates: 41°20′08″N 47°47′36″E

Geography
- Location within Caucasus Mountains Location within Azerbaijan
- Country: Russia
- District: Akhtynsky District
- Parent range: Lateral Range; Greater Caucasus

Mount Shalbuzdag is a mountain peak of the Greater Caucasus range, located in the Akhtynsky District of Russia. The elevation of the peak is 4,142 metres (13,589 ft) above sea level. In Islam, the mountain is considered sacred: it is home to Pir Suleyman, a site of pilgrimage for the faithful.
