= Samurçay =

Human settlement in Azerbaijan

Coordinates: 41°50′N 48°36′E

Samurçay (also, Samurçay) is a village in the municipality of Nabran in the Khachmaz Rayon of Azerbaijan.

It is the northernmost inhabited village in Azerbaijan.
