= Kabir, Republic of Dagestan =

Kabir Кабир Кьепӏир
- Selo
- Location within Republic of Dagestan Location within Russia
- Coordinates: 41°33′N 48°02′E
- Country: Russia
- Region: Republic of Dagestan
- District: Kurakhsky District
- Time zone: UTC+3:00

Kabir (Russian: Кабир; Lezgian: Кьепӏир) is a rural locality (a selo) in Kurakhsky District, Republic of Dagestan, Russia. The population was 1,424 as of 2010. There are 16 streets.

== Geography ==
Kabir is located 26 km southeast of Kurakh (the district's administrative centre) by road. Ikra and Akhnig are the nearest rural localities.

== Nationalities ==
Lezgins live there.
