= Karakyure =

Karakyure Каракюре Къара Куьре
- Selo
- Location within Republic of Dagestan Location within Russia
- Coordinates: 41°25′N 47°57′E
- Country: Russia
- Region: Republic of Dagestan
- District: Dokuzparinsky District
- Time zone: UTC+3:00

Karakyure (Russian: Каракюре; Lezgian: Къара Куьре) is a rural locality (a selo) in Dokuzparinsky District, Republic of Dagestan, Russia. The population was 1,209 as of 2010. There are 6 streets.

== Geography ==
Karakyure is located 8 km east of Usukhchay (the district's administrative centre) by road. Novoye Karakyure and Usukhchay are the nearest rural localities.
