= Samurskiy okrug =

Coordinates: 41°27′53″N 47°44′24″E

Samurskiy okrug Самурский округ
- Okrug
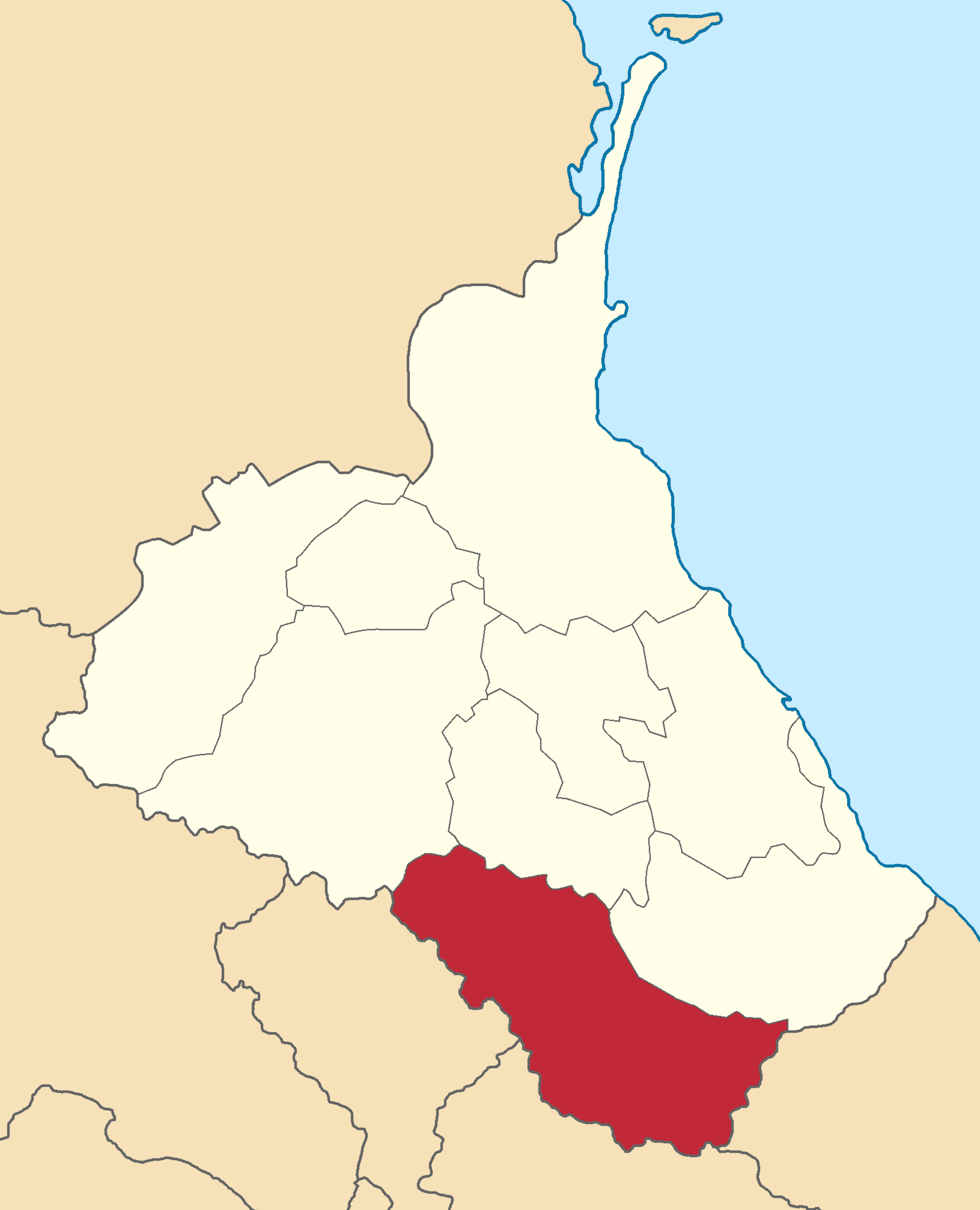
- Location in the Dagestan Oblast
- Country: Russian Empire
- Viceroyalty: Caucasus
- Oblast: Dagestan
- Established: 1839
- Abolished: 1928
- Capital: Akhty

Area
  - Total: 3,708.80 km^{2} (1,431.98 sq mi)

Population (1916)
  - Total: 71,556
  - Density: 19.294/km^{2} (49.970/sq mi)
  - Rural: 100.00%

The Samurskiy okrug (Note: Russian: Самурский округ, pre-reform orthography: Самурскій округъ [səmʊrskʲɪj ɐkrʊk]) was a district (okrug) of the Dagestan Oblast of the Caucasus Viceroyalty of the Russian Empire. The area of the Samurskiy okrug is included in contemporary Dagestan of the Russian Federation. The district's administrative centre was Akhty.

== Administrative divisions ==
The prefectures (участки, uchastki) of the Samurskiy okrug in 1917 were:

Name	1912 population
Akhtyparinskiy prefecture (Ахтыпаринский участок)	29,309
Dokuzparinskiy prefecture (Докузпаринский участок)	21,489
Luchekskiy prefecture (Лучекский участок)	19,042

== Demographics ==
=== Russian Empire Census ===
According to the Russian Empire Census, the Samurskiy okrug had a population of 35,633 on 28 January [O.S. 15 January] 1897, including 15,284 men and 20,349 women. The majority of the population indicated Lezgin ("Kyurin") to be their mother tongue.

Linguistic composition of the Samurskiy okrug in 1897
Language	Native speakers	%
Lezgian	33,965	95.32
Kazi-Kumukh	515	1.45
Tatar (Note: Before 1918, Azerbaijanis were generally known as "Tatars". This term, employed by the Russians, referred to Turkic-speaking Muslims of the South Caucasus. After 1918, with the establishment of the Azerbaijan Democratic Republic and "especially during the Soviet era", the Tatar group identified itself as "Azerbaijani".)	379	1.06
Kumyk	346	0.97
Avar-Andean	174	0.49
Russian	103	0.29
Dargin	63	0.18
Polish	44	0.12
Lithuanian	13	0.04
Georgian	7	0.02
Armenian	3	0.01
Jewish	3	0.01
German	1	0.00
Other	17	0.05
TOTAL	35,633	100.00

=== Kavkazskiy kalendar ===
According to the 1917 publication of Kavkazskiy kalendar, the Samurskiy okrug had a population of 71,556 on 14 January [O.S. 1 January] 1916, including 37,486 men and 34,070 women, 71,193 of whom were the permanent population, and 363 were temporary residents:

Nationality	Number	%
North Caucasians	68,432	95.63
Shia Muslims (Note: Primarily Tatars.)	2,761	3.86
Russians	306	0.43
Other Europeans	49	0.07
Armenians	7	0.01
Jews	1	0.00
TOTAL	71,556	100.00

== Bibliography ==
- Bournoutian, George A. (2018). Armenia and Imperial Decline: The Yerevan Province, 1900–1914. Milton Park, Abingdon, Oxon: Routledge. ISBN 978-1-351-06260-2. OCLC 1037283914.
- Hovannisian, Richard G. (1971). The Republic of Armenia. Vol. 1: The First Year, 1918–1919. Berkeley: University of California Press. ISBN 978-0520019843.
- Кавказский календарь на 1913 год [Caucasian calendar for 1913] (in Russian) (68th ed.). Tiflis: Tipografiya kantselyarii Ye.I.V. na Kavkaze, kazenny dom. 1913. Archived from the original on 19 April 2022.
- Кавказский календарь на 1917 год [Caucasian calendar for 1917] (in Russian) (72nd ed.). Tiflis: Tipografiya kantselyarii Ye.I.V. na Kavkaze, kazenny dom. 1917. Archived from the original on 4 November 2021.
- Tsutsiev, Arthur (2014). Atlas of the Ethno-Political History of the Caucasus (PDF). Translated by Nora Seligman Favorov. New Haven: Yale University Press. ISBN 9780300153088. Archived (PDF) from the original on 17 June 2023.
