= Usukhchay =

Rural locality in Dagestan, Russia

Usukhchay Усухчай

Other transcription(s)
  - Lezgian: Усугъ
- Interactive map of Usukhchay
- Location within Republic of Dagestan Location within European Russia Location within Russia
- Coordinates: 41°25′30″N 47°55′03″E
- Country: Russia
- Federal subject: Dagestan

Population
  - Estimate (2025): 1,938 )
- Time zone: UTC+3 (MSK)
- Postal code: 368750
- OKTMO ID: 82621473101

Usukhchay (Russian: Усухчай, Lezgian: Усугъ) is a rural locality (a selo) and the administrative center of Dokuzparinsky District of the Republic of Dagestan, Russia. Population: 1,881 (2010 census); 1,836 (2002 census);

== Geography ==
The village is situated at the foot of Mount Shalbuzdag, Erydag, and Gestinkil, on the right bank of the Samur River, near the point where the Usukhchay River flows into the Samur. It is located 105 km southwest of Derbent and 230 km south of Makhachkala.

The area surrounding the village is characterized by numerous fruit orchards.
