= Samur (river) =

River forming the Azerbaijan-Dagestan border

Samur سمور
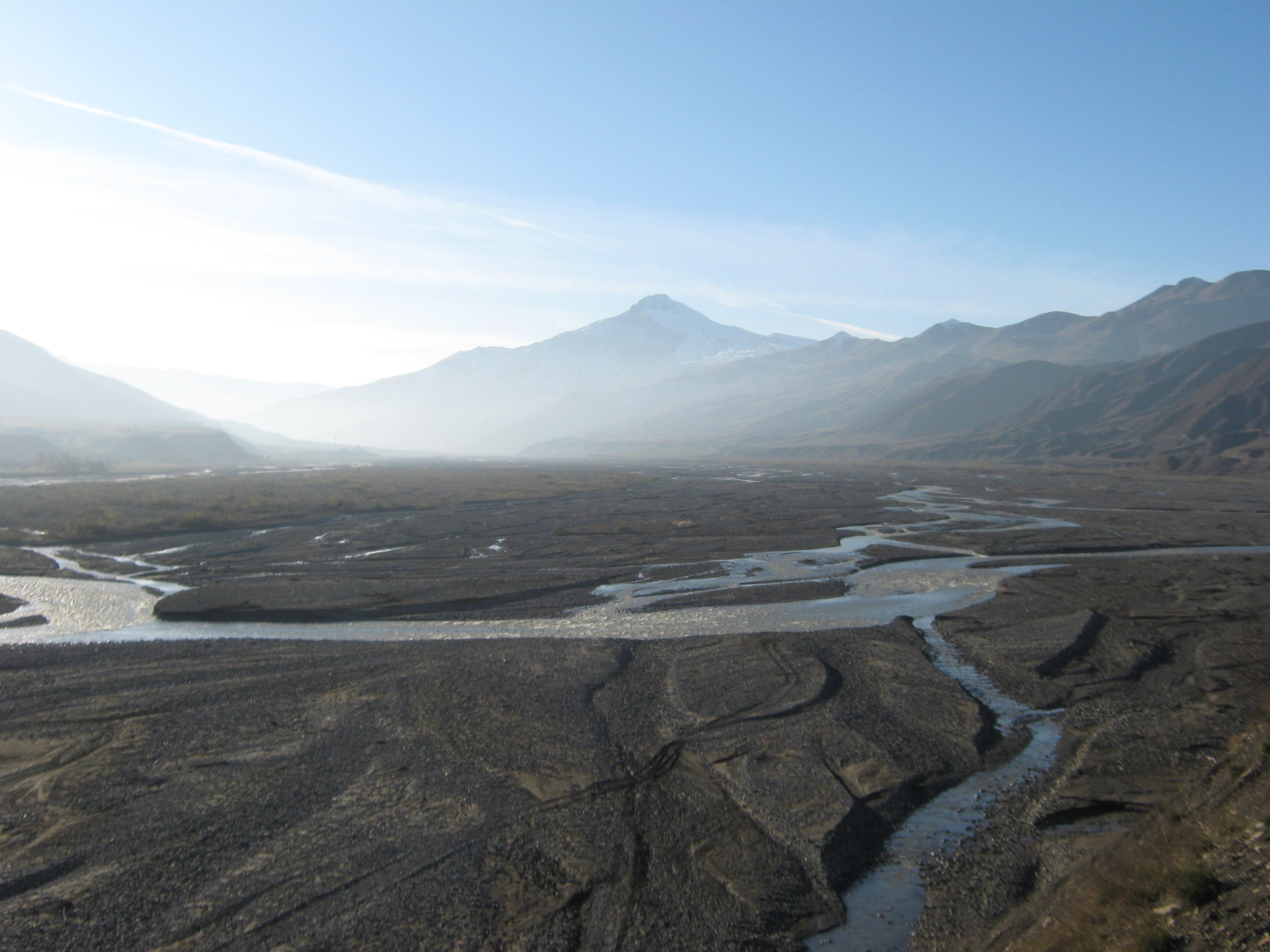

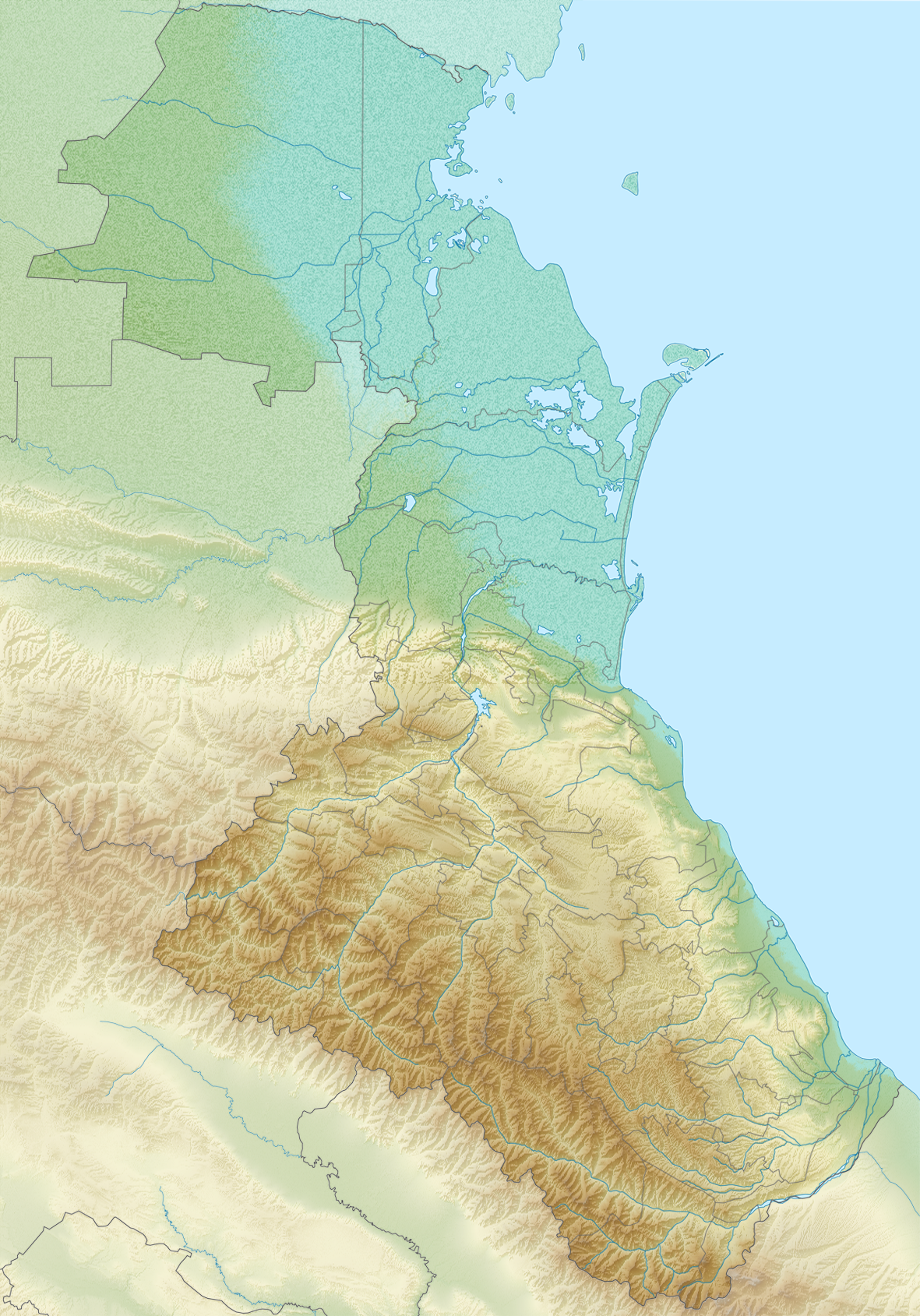
- Location within Republic of Dagestan Location within Azerbaijan Location within Caucasus Mountains
- Native name: Самыр (Rutul)

Location
- Countries: Russia and Azerbaijan
- Region: Caucasus
- Districts: Dagestan; Qusar; Khachmaz
- City: Samurçay

Physical characteristics
- Source: Main Caucasian Range; Greater Caucasus
  - location: Rutulsky District, Dagestan, Russia
  - coordinates: 41°36′42″N 47°16′56″E
  - elevation: 3,648 m (11,969 ft)
- Mouth: Caspian Sea
  - location: Dagestan, Russia
  - coordinates: 41°54′38″N 48°29′1″E
- Length: 216 km (134 mi)
- Basin size: 7,330 km^{2} (2,830 sq mi)
- Discharge
  - location: downstream into Tahirçay and Uğar rivers of Azerbaijan and finally directly downstream into Caspian Sea
  - average: 75 m^{3}/s (2,600 cu ft/s)

Basin features
- Tributaries
  - left: Khalakhur
  - right: Usuxçay

The Samur (Azerbaijani: Самурчај, romanized: Samurçay; Lezgian: Самурвацl; Russian: Самур; Rutul: Самыр) is a river in Russia's Dagestan Republic, also partially flowing through Azerbaijan and forming part of the Azerbaijan–Russia border.

== Overview ==
The Samur river originates in glaciers and mountain springs of the Greater Caucasus mountains. It rises in the northeastern part of Guton Mount at an elevation of 3,648 m (11,969 ft). Descending from the mountains for 7 km (4.3 mi), the river receives its tributary the Khalakhur River, flowing down from an elevation of 3,730 m (12,240 ft). The length of the river is 216 km (134 mi), its basin 5,000 km^{2} (1,900 sq mi). The elevated and midsections of the river from through the territory of Russia, lower sections flow through Azerbaijan, making up the Russian-Azerbaijani border. After receiving its tributaries, including Tahirçay, Dyultychay, Kara-Samur, Shinazchay, Tairjal, Akhtychay, Usuxçay, and Generchay, the river channel becomes wider. The Gylgerychay is an artificial tributary whose channel was diverted into the Samur River at a point 4 km upstream from its mouth. Once the river is in the open Caspian basin, it splits some of its parts into the Tahirçay (34 km (21 mi)) and Uğar (28 km (17 mi)) rivers on Azerbaijani territory. The river mainly feeds on rain and underground waters with its volume broken up as follows: 42% from rain, 32% from underground waters, 22% from snow, 4% from glaciers. The river supplies irrigation water to the Samur-Absheron channel, which follows south to Jeyranbatan reservoir.

== See also ==
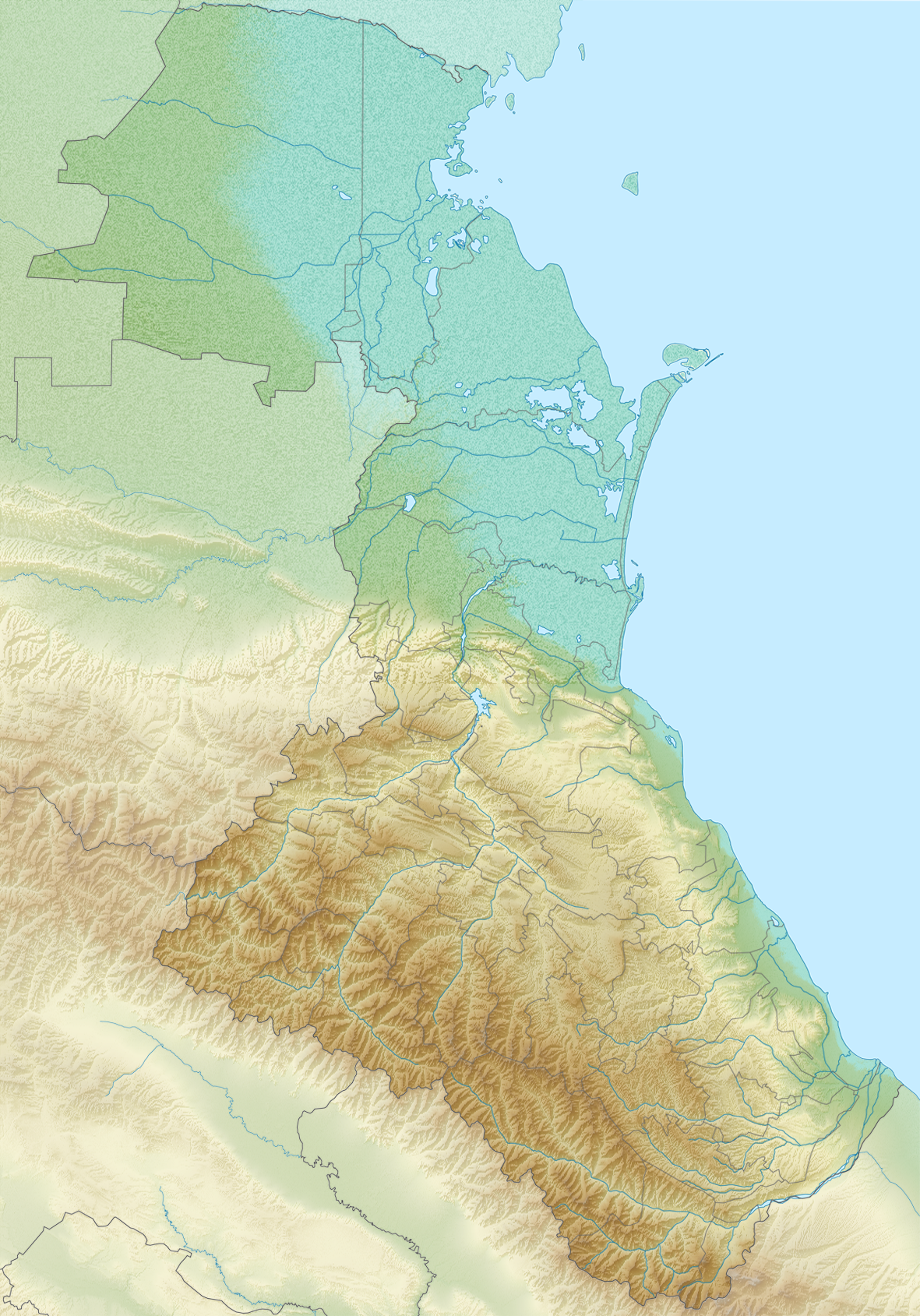
Rivers of Dagestan, Samur at bottom
- Rivers and lakes in Azerbaijan
