= Akhty, Republic of Dagestan =

Akhty Ахты
- Selo
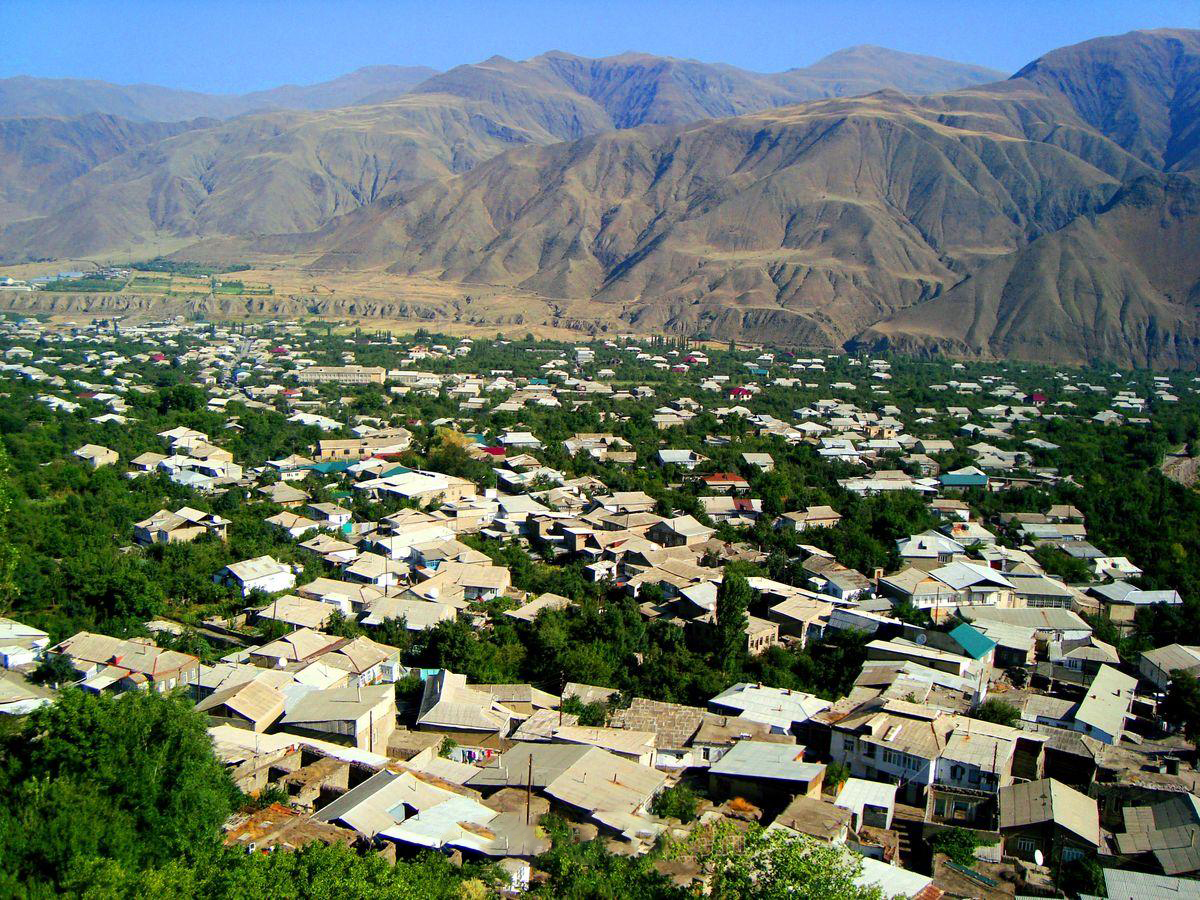
- View of Akhty
- Interactive map of Akhty
- Location of Akhty Akhty (Republic of Dagestan)
- Coordinates: 41°27′53″N 47°44′24″E
- Country: Russia
- Federal subject: Dagestan
- Administrative district: Akhtynsky District
- Selsoviet: Akhtynsky Selsoviet
- Elevation: 1,065 m (3,494 ft)

Population (2010 Census)
  - Total: 13,405
  - Estimate (2021): 15,285 (+14%)

Administrative status
  - Capital of: Akhtynsky District

Municipal status
  - Municipal district: Akhtynsky Municipal District
  - Rural settlement: Akhtynsky Rural Settlement
  - Capital of: Akhtynsky Municipal District, Akhtynsky Rural Settlement
- Time zone: UTC+3 (MSK)
- Postal codes: 368730, 368731
- Dialing code: +7 87263
- OKTMO ID: 82606405101
- Website: www.ahty.ru

Akhty (Russian: Ахты́; Lezgian: Ахцагь) is a rural locality (selo) and the administrative center of Akhtynsky District of the Republic of Dagestan, Russia, located in the south of the republic at the confluence of the Akhtychay and Samur Rivers, 254 kilometers (158 mi) from Makhachkala. Population: 13,405 (2010 census); 13,152 (2002 census); 7,356 (1989 Soviet census).

== History ==
It was founded around the mid-1st millennium BCE. In the 1st century CE, it had the name Turi and was a part of Caucasian Albania. In the first centuries CE, weaving and pottery, as well as metal processing, developed here. After the collapse of Caucasian Albania in the 5th century CE, the area became part of the Kingdom of Lakz, which Akhty was assumed to be the capital city of, under the name of Bilistan.

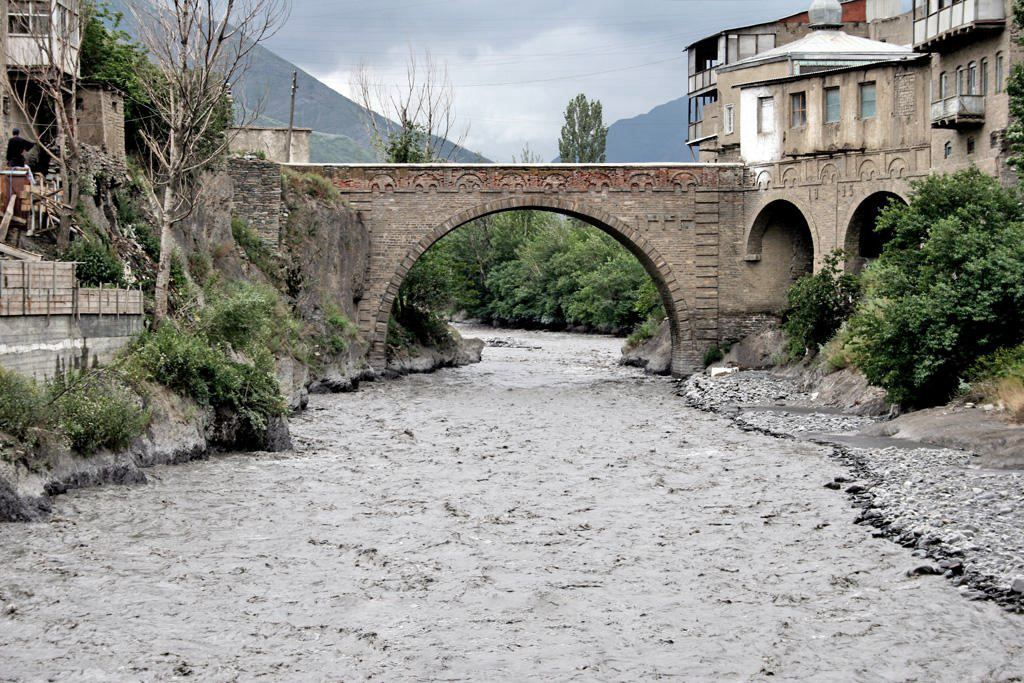
Stone arch bridge and the river in Akhty

During the Caucasian War of 1817–1864, Akhty was taken by Russian troops in 1839. In the same year, Akhtinskoye fortress was established at this location. In 1848, the fortress played an important role in defense against the attacking Shamil troops. During the Russian Empire, the settlement was the administrative capital of the Samursky Okrug.

== Features ==
Monument to Sharvili, hero of the national Lezgian epic. The Greater Caucasus mountains surround the town.

=== Theatres ===
Akhty is known as the birthplace of Dagestani theatrical art. It was here that the first Lezgian drama theater in Dagestan was established in 1905. In 1949, the theater was relocated to Derbent and renamed the Suleyman Stalsky State Lezgian Musical and Drama Theatre. In 1956, the Akhty People's Theatre was established.

Akhty is also home to the folklore ensembles "Turi", "Shalbuzdag", and "Sharvili", as well as the children's model folk instrument orchestra "Sokolenok" ("Little Falcon"), which won third place at the regional stage of the First All-Russian Festival of National Instrument Ensembles and Orchestras of Southern Russia, held in Rostov-on-Don. The orchestra was also recognized by the jury as one of the few ensembles proficient in traditional musical instruments, including historical instruments that remain in use in Dagestan to this day, such as the kemenche, tar, zarb, saz, duduk, and zurna.

=== Spa of Akhty ===
The Akhty spa is located to the southwest of Akhty, on the left bank of the Akhtychay River inside a gorge. The spa has three different types of mineral water: hydrogen sulfide, radon, and iodine-bromine. The temperature of the source varies from 38 to 40 °C to 65-68 °C. Its temperature fluctuates depending on the season. Spa resort "Akhty" is located here.

== Notable people ==
- Bunyamudin Mustafayev, footballer
- Dzhabrail Gadzhiev, wrestler

== Climate ==
Akhty has a warm-summer humid continental climate (Köppen climate classification: Dfb) with moderately warm and humid summers and cold, dry winters. Sunshine is plentiful year-round.

Climate data for Akhty (extremes 1910-present)
| Month | Jan | Feb | Mar | Apr | May | Jun | Jul | Aug | Sep | Oct | Nov | Dec | Year |
|---|---|---|---|---|---|---|---|---|---|---|---|---|---|
| Record high °C (°F) | 23.4 (74.1) | 23.1 (73.6) | 28.6 (83.5) | 33.7 (92.7) | 35.8 (96.4) | 37.7 (99.9) | 39.6 (103.3) | 38.8 (101.8) | 40.6 (105.1) | 32.1 (89.8) | 28.4 (83.1) | 26.9 (80.4) | 40.6 (105.1) |
| Mean daily maximum °C (°F) | 4.7 (40.5) | 5.5 (41.9) | 9.0 (48.2) | 15.6 (60.1) | 20.0 (68.0) | 23.1 (73.6) | 25.6 (78.1) | 25.5 (77.9) | 21.2 (70.2) | 16.2 (61.2) | 11.0 (51.8) | 6.7 (44.1) | 15.3 (59.6) |
| Mean daily minimum °C (°F) | −5.9 (21.4) | −5.1 (22.8) | −1.6 (29.1) | 4.4 (39.9) | 9.0 (48.2) | 12.4 (54.3) | 15.2 (59.4) | 14.8 (58.6) | 10.6 (51.1) | 5.5 (41.9) | 0.5 (32.9) | −3.8 (25.2) | 4.7 (40.4) |
| Record low °C (°F) | −24.1 (−11.4) | −24.5 (−12.1) | −16.6 (2.1) | −9.5 (14.9) | −1.3 (29.7) | 0.2 (32.4) | 3.9 (39.0) | 5.5 (41.9) | −3.5 (25.7) | −10.2 (13.6) | −19.2 (−2.6) | −18.0 (−0.4) | −24.5 (−12.1) |
| Average precipitation mm (inches) | 11 (0.4) | 14 (0.6) | 22 (0.9) | 36 (1.4) | 52 (2.0) | 62 (2.4) | 41 (1.6) | 36 (1.4) | 42 (1.7) | 32 (1.3) | 20 (0.8) | 12 (0.5) | 380 (15) |
| Mean monthly sunshine hours | 153 | 156 | 184 | 193 | 238 | 258 | 270 | 258 | 230 | 198 | 160 | 153 | 2,451 |
Source 1: Climatebase.ru
Source 2: Pogoda.ru.net
