= Akhtynsky District =

Akhtynsky District Ахтынский район (Russian)
- District

Other transcription(s)
  - Lezgian: Ахцагь район
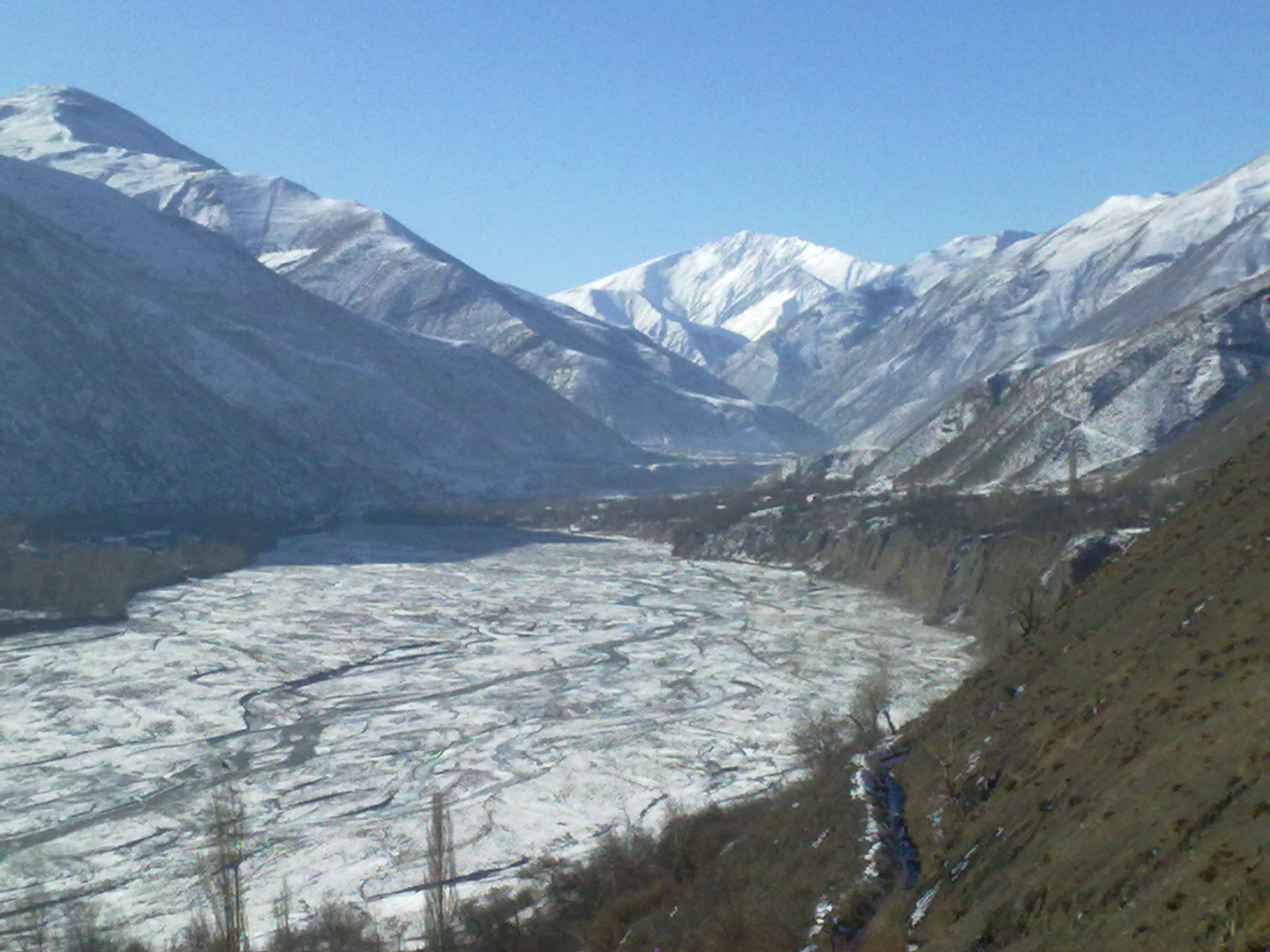
- Mount Yarusadag in Akhtynsky District

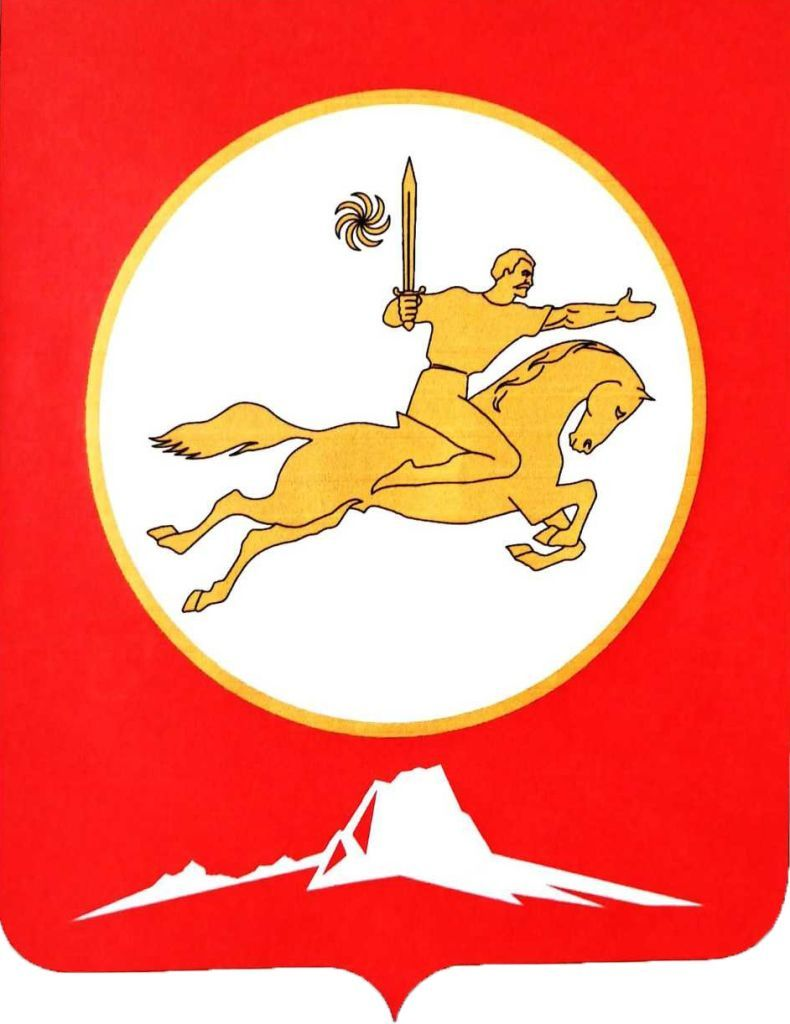
- Coat of arms
- Location of Akhtynsky District in the Republic of Dagestan
- Coordinates: 41°28′N 47°44′E
- Country: Russia
- Federal subject: Republic of Dagestan
- Established: 1928
- Administrative center: Akhty

Area
  - Total: 1,120 km^{2} (430 sq mi)

Population (2010 Census)
  - Total: 32,604
  - Density: 29.1/km^{2} (75.4/sq mi)
  - Urban: 0%
  - Rural: 100%

Administrative structure
  - Administrative divisions: 4 Selsoviets
  - Inhabited localities: 19 rural localities

Municipal structure
  - Municipally incorporated as: Akhtynsky Municipal District
  - Municipal divisions: 0 urban settlements, 13 rural settlements
- Time zone: UTC+3 (MSK)
- OKTMO ID: 82606000
- Website: https://akhtymr.ru

Population of Akhtynsky District
- 2010 Census: 32,604
- 2002 Census: 31,592
- 1989 Census: 29,160
- 1979 Census: 31,609

Akhtynsky District (Russian: Ахты́нский район; Lezgian: Ахцагь район) is an administrative and municipal district (raion), one of the forty-one in the Republic of Dagestan, Russia. It is located in the south of the republic and borders with Rutulsky, Kurakhsky, Magaramkentsky, and Dokuzparinsky Districts; in the southwest it has a 62-kilometer (39 mi) long border with Azerbaijan. The area of the district is 1,120 square kilometers (430 sq mi). Its administrative center is the rural locality (a selo) of Akhty. As of the 2010 Census, the total population of the district was 32,604, with the population of Akhty accounting for 41.1% of that number.

== Geography ==
The Samur River flows in the north of the district from west to east. The Akhtychay River flows from southwest to northeast of the district and into the Samur River in Akhty. Gelmets-Akhtynsky Ridge is located between the two rivers.

== Administrative and municipal status ==
Within the framework of administrative divisions, Akhtynsky District is one of the forty-one in the Republic of Dagestan. The district is divided into four selsoviets which comprise nineteen rural localities. As a municipal division, the district is incorporated as Akhtynsky Municipal District. Its four selsoviets are incorporated as thirteen rural settlements within the municipal district. The selo of Akhty serves as the administrative center of both the administrative and municipal district.

== Demographics ==
Ethnically, all of the rural localities in the district are Lezgian, with the exception of the selo of Khnov, which is populated by the Rutul people.
