= Dokuzparinsky District =

Dokuzparinsky District Докузпаринский район (Russian)
- District

Other transcription(s)
  - Lezgian: Докъузпара район
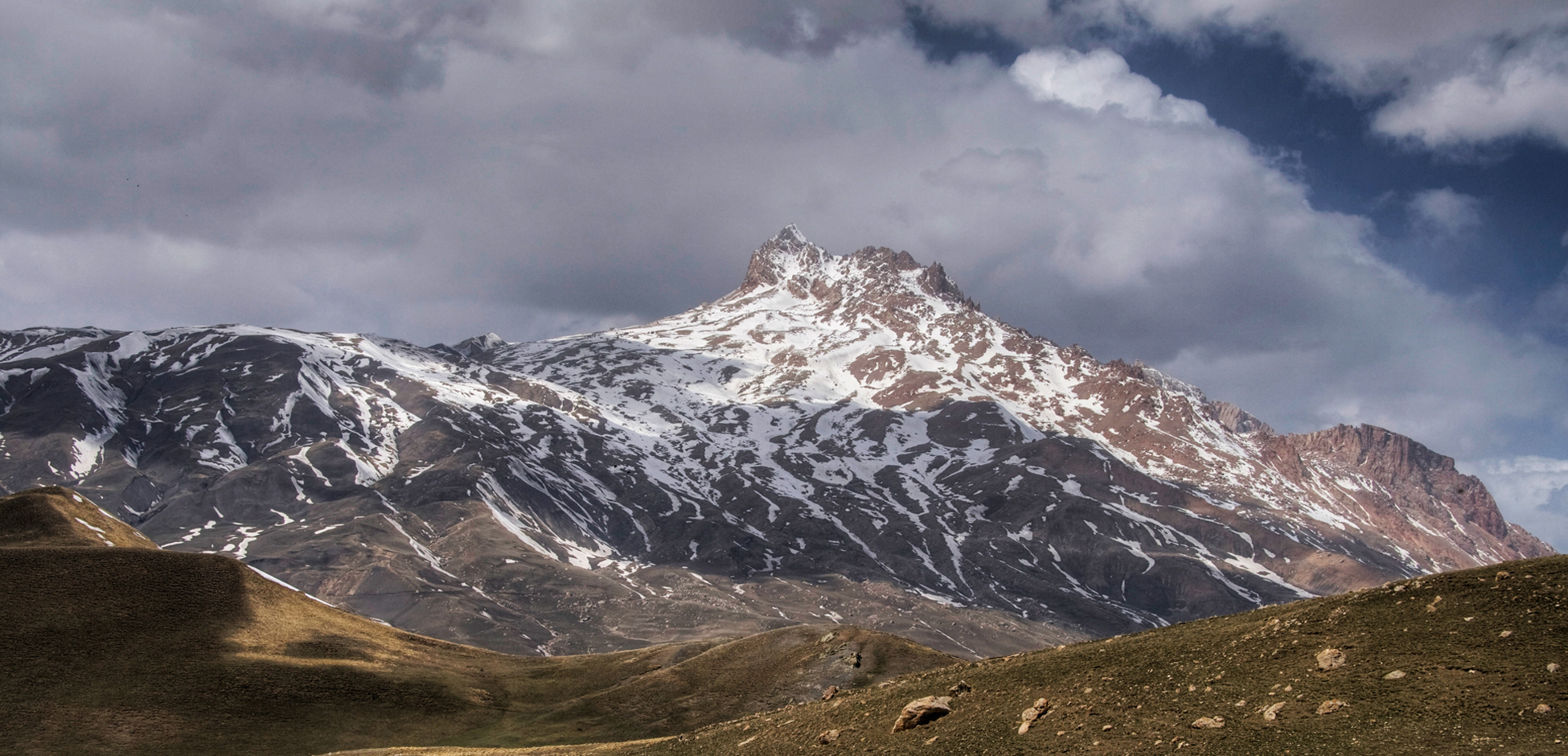
- Mount Shalbuzdag in Akhtynsky and Dokuzparinsky Districts

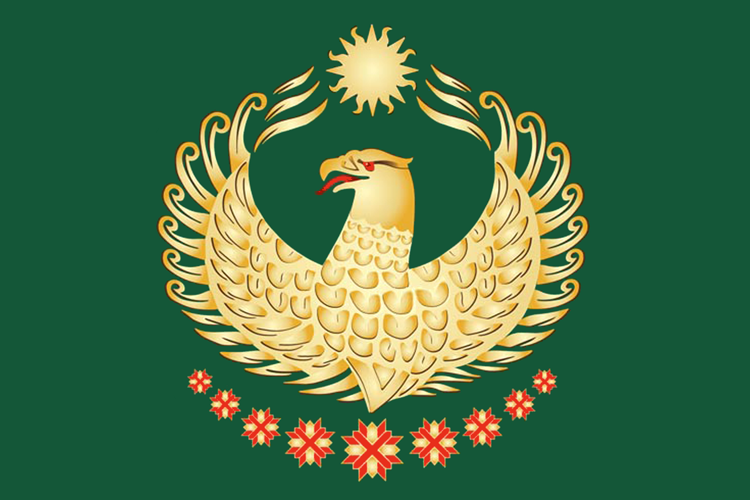
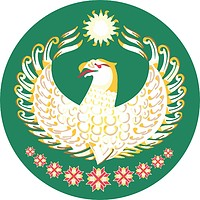
- Flag Coat of arms
- Location of Dokuzparinsky District in the Republic of Dagestan
- Coordinates: 41°25′N 47°55′E
- Country: Russia
- Federal subject: Republic of Dagestan
- Established: 1934
- Administrative center: Usukhchay

Area
  - Total: 452.1 km^{2} (174.6 sq mi)

Population (2010 Census)
  - Total: 15,357
  - Density: 33.97/km^{2} (87.98/sq mi)
  - Urban: 0%
  - Rural: 100%

Administrative structure
  - Administrative divisions: 2 Selsoviets
  - Inhabited localities: 16 rural localities

Municipal structure
  - Municipally incorporated as: Dokuzparinsky Municipal District
  - Municipal divisions: 0 urban settlements, 9 rural settlements
- Time zone: UTC+3 (MSK)
- OKTMO ID: 82621000
- Website: http://dokuz-para.ru

Population of Dokuzparinsky District
- 2010 Census: 15,357
- 2002 Census: 14,330

Dokuzparinsky District (Russian: Докузпари́нский райо́н; Lezgian: Докъузпара район) is an administrative and municipal district (raion), one of the forty-one in the Republic of Dagestan, Russia. It is located in the south of the republic, being the southernmost district of Russia. The area of the district is 452.1 square kilometers (174.6 sq mi). Its administrative center is the rural locality (a selo) of Usukhchay. As of the 2010 Census, the total population of the district was 15,357, with the population of Usukhchay accounting for 12.2% of that number.

== Administrative and municipal status ==
Within the framework of administrative divisions, Dokuzparinsky District is one of the forty-one in the Republic of Dagestan. The district is divided into two selsoviets which comprise sixteen rural localities. As a municipal division, the district is incorporated as Dokuzparinsky Municipal District. Its two selsoviets are incorporated as nine rural settlements within the municipal district. The selo of Usukhchay serves as the administrative center of both the administrative and municipal district.
