= Capture of Khudat =

1720 capture of Khudat by Lezgins

- Part of Lezgin campaign into Shirvan
Date	1720 (date disputed; see Dating)
Location	Khudat, Quba Khanate (present-day Azerbaijan)
Result	Lezgin victory: Khudat captured; Sultan Ahmad Khan killed; Quba Khanate brought under the authority of the later Lezgin Khanate

Belligerents
Lezgins	Safavid Iran; Quba Khanate

Commanders and leaders
Haji Davud; Haji Gayb of Alpan	Sultan Ahmad Khan †

Strength
Unknown	Unknown

Casualties and losses
Unknown	Heavy

The Capture of Khudat was a military engagement of the anti-Safavid uprising in Shirvan and Dagestan, in which rebel forces captured Khudat, the fortified residence of the ruler of the Quba Khanate, and killed the ruler, Sultan Ahmad Khan. The sources disagree on the year. Abbasgulu Bakikhanov's account, as summarised by Eskenderov, places the event in 1711; Eskenderov argues for 1720; and an editorial commentary to Bakikhanov's Gulistan-i Iram gives 1721. Sultan Ahmad's infant son, Husayn Ali, survived and later became ruler of Quba.

== Background ==
=== Situation in Quba Khanate ===
The Quba Khanate emerged in the later 17th century in the northeast of present-day Azerbaijan as a semi-independent administrative unit. A local ruler named Husayn Khan took control of Salyan, Quba and Kulkhan toward the end of the century, and the khanate he founded remained dependent on the Safavid state.

Aliev lists several factors behind the increasing armed conflict in the region as Safavid power weakened. Most residents of Quba and its surrounding districts followed the Hanafi school of Islam while the ruling family had adopted Twelver Shia Islam, and the population of neighbouring Dagestan was mostly Shafi'i. Eskenderov notes that the population of Quba and its province was overwhelmingly Lezgin. Khudat was the residence of the Quba khan. Eskenderov also describes the uprising led by Haji Davud as strongly anti-Iranian and anti-Shia in character.

=== Sultan Ahmad Khan ===
Sources agree that the ruler at Khudat was Sultan Ahmad Khan but differ on his origins. Bakikhanov, as summarised by Eskenderov, presents him as a Persian appointee, the son of Ahmad Khan and grandson of Husayn Khan. Eskenderov cites the 1718 travel journal of Lieutenant A. I. Lopukhin, a member of Artemy Volynsky's embassy, who passed through Quba and recorded that the khan, called "Saltan Agmet", was about 14 years old and had been chosen by the local inhabitants rather than appointed by the shah. On this basis Eskenderov regards him as the founder of a second dynasty of Quba khans.

== Prelude ==
According to the editorial commentary to Gulistan-i Iram, the people of Jar rose against the Iranian authorities in 1707 and again in 1711, when they raided Shamakhi and were joined by peasants from Sheki and by Tsakhurs. Haji Davud, a native of Dedeli in the Mushkur district, took the title haji after a pilgrimage to Mecca and later styled himself bek as he came to lead the rebel detachments. The Kaitag utsmi was among those who sent forces to support him. In 1719, Safavid troops took advantage of a decline in popular support for the movement and the withdrawal of Surkhay Khan of Gazikumukh to Dagestan, and besieged Haji Davud in the fortress of Derbent, from which he escaped.

In 1720, as Safavid Iran faced an Hotaki invasion, the shah appealed for help to the shamkhal of Tarki, the utsmi of Kaitag and other Dagestani rulers. According to the commentary, Haji Davud used the opportunity to step up his activity, sending letters calling on Dagestani rulers to rise against the Safavids and, together with Surkhay Khan of Gazikumukh, raising a large force.

== Capture of Khudat ==
Rebel forces took Khudat and killed Sultan Ahmad Khan. Aliev states that the khan was killed at Khudat by rebel Lezgins. Bakikhanov's account, as summarised by Eskenderov, holds that the rebels seized Khudat at the instigation of Haji Gayb of Alpan, described as a vizier of Haji Davud, and killed the khan together with his family and entourage. Eskenderov observes that nothing else is known of such a vizier and that other historians give the name as Haji Ali. Gulistan-i Iram states that Khudat was taken by Haji Davud.

Eskenderov offers another reconstruction. In his view, Sultan Ahmad was a child when the people of Quba chose him as khan, and local elders governed on his behalf. When he came of age he wished to pursue an independent policy, contrary to the aims of the rebel leaders, and the rebels killed him in 1720 for refusing to join the anti-Safavid uprising. The rebels who entered the residence spared his six-month-old son.

== Aftermath ==
The fortress of Khudat remained the khan's residence until it was completely destroyed during the events of 1735, after which the seat of the khanate was moved to Quba.

According to Bakikhanov's account, as summarised by Eskenderov, the infant Husayn Ali was saved by the rebels themselves and taken to Akhty, though other authors name Tahircal. The political status of Quba after the fall of Khudat is unclear. A. G. Serebrov, cited by Eskenderov, reports that the khanate became the possession of Surkhay Khan of Kazikumukh, while Eskenderov argues that Quba always retained a khan of its own.

Bakikhanov's account has Husayn Ali presented to Peter I at Derbent in 1722 and confirmed in his title, and the commentary repeats that Peter administered an oath to him that year and that he ruled until 1758. Eskenderov notes that this episode rests on a letter of Fath-Ali Khan to Catherine II and is not mentioned in the memoirs of Peter's companions. He points instead to an oath dated 20 October 1726 taken in the name of the minor Husayn Ali, with elders from several villages acting as his guardians. According to Aliev, Husayn Ali Khan was officially recognised as ruler of Quba by both Safavid Iran and Tsarist Russia, and after his death in 1758 his son Fath Ali Khan succeeded him.

== Dating ==
Three dates for the fall of Khudat appear in the literature:

- 1711: Bakikhanov's account, as summarised by Eskenderov, places the capture and the killing of Sultan Ahmad in 1711.
- 1720: Eskenderov rejects 1711 for several reasons. He argues that no attack on the khan took place that year. A decree issued under Sultan Ahmad's seal dates to 1710, and Lopukhin met the same khan alive in 1718. The Husayn Ali who later ruled Quba was still a child in 1726 and, according to J. G. Gerber, nine years old in 1728, so he cannot have been born before 1711. A Dagestani chronicle translated by A. R. Shikhsaidov gives the year 1132 AH (1719–20) for the destruction of the "emir of Khudat" but does not name him.
- 1721: the commentary to Gulistan-i Iram states that Haji Davud took Khudat on the eve of Peter I's Caspian campaign, giving the year 1721. In the same notes, citing F. M. Aliev, it argues that the capture of Shabran, which Bakikhanov placed in 1711, should be moved to 1720.

== Bibliography ==
- Eskenderov, Bedirkhan E. (2019). "Происхождение кубинских ханов: новая версия" [The Origin of Quba Khans: New Version]. History, Archaeology and Ethnography of the Caucasus (in Russian). 15 (2): 132–148. doi:10.32653/CH152132-148.
- Aliev, Saleh Muhammedoğlu (2002). "Kuba". TDV İslâm Ansiklopedisi (in Turkish). Vol. 26. Ankara: TDV İslâm Araştırmaları Merkezi. pp. 297–298.
- Bakikhanov, Abbasgulu. "Комментарии: К Периоду четвертому" [Commentary: To Period Four]. Гюлистан-и Ирам (Russian edition, commentary notes) (in Russian). Vostlit.
- "Кубинское ханство". Great Russian Encyclopedia (in Russian).
