= Haji Davud =

18th century Lezgin leader

Haji Davud Mushkurvi
- Imam Haji Davud Beg

Khan of Shirvan
- Successor: Surkhay Khan
- Reign: 1721–1728

Quba Khan
- Reign: 1718-1726
- Successor: Husayn Ali Khan (Quba khan)
- Born: 1680; Dədəli, Khachmaz
- Died: 1738 (aged 57–58); Gelibolu, Ottoman Empire
- Religion: Sunni Islam
- Occupation: Imam of Southern Dagestan, Leader of Sunni Madrasa in Mushkur, Military commander.
- Military career
- Conflicts: List: Lezgin campaign into Shirvan; Capture of Khudat; Sack of Shamakhi; Capture of Barda; Battle near Shaki (1721); Sack of Ardabil

Haji Davud Mushkurvi (Lezg: Гьажи Дауд Мюшкюрви), also referred to as Ad Jabali (Lezg: ад-Джаба́ли) or simply as Daud Beg (Lezg: Дауд-бек), was an 18th-century Lezgin ruler and military leader who became the Khan of Shirvan (1721–1728).

== Biography ==
He was born in 1680 in the village of Dedeli in the region of Mushkur. He had humble origins, though he was known to be literate. After his pilgrimage to Mecca, he received the honorary title of Hajji and became one of the influential spiritual leaders in Southern Dagestan and Northeastern Azerbaijan, taking charge of the Sunni madrasa in Mushkur.

In 1711, during the anti-Iranian uprising in Shirvan and southern Dagestan, he became the leader of the rebel army, assumed the title of Beg, and began to refer to himself as Haji Davud Beg. He could speak Lezgin, Arabic, Persian, and Turkic languages.

== Rebellion ==
Haji Davud with his Feudal allies (Haji Davud in the middle)

In 1707, the Sunni Muslim population of Shirvan and Dagestan began a military rebellion against the Safavid authorities, in response to the newly implemented tax reforms of Soltan Hoseyn Shah and the massacres committed by the Qizilbash against Sunni Muslims. By 1711, the uprising had spread throughout the lands of Tabasaran, Samur, and Shirvan, and Haji Davud had become one of the leaders of the uprising.

In the same year, Davud Beg allied with Dagestani feudal lords such as Surkhay Khan, Ali Sultan of Elisu, and Ahmed Khan of Kaitag. He attempted to besiege Shamakhi but failed to maintain it. In 1712, he besieged Shamakhi once more with the joint forces of the Gazikumukh Khanate, and decisively defeated the local ruler of the city in open-field combat. The Lezgins even attempted to pursue the retreating Safavid forces back into the city, but could not reach the city gates in time. Even after his victory in the outskirts of the city, he did not attempt to besiege the Shamakhi again, as he was not confident in the strength of his army.

== Initial Arrest ==
In 1719, the Safavid authorities made efforts to suppress the uprising and even managed to capture Haji Davud and imprison him in Derbent. However, due to the negligence of the guards, he managed to escape shortly afterward and resumed his military campaigns by 1720.

== Campaigns into Shirvan ==
illustration of Haji Davud riiding a horse

In 1720, Haji Davud managed to unite most of the Lezgic unions and Bekdoms and amassed a large army. He proceeded to attack Safavid Shirvan and successfully captured the cities of Khudat and Shabran. By the end of August, much of the Eastern Caucasus had been captured by the highlanders. In the meantime, the Safavid armies were centered around Derbent, Baku, and Shamakhi. After assessing the situation, Haji Davud decided to expand his control throughout villages and towns rather than simply raiding Safavid garrisons.

In 1721, Haji Davud raised an army of 15,000 tribesmen and made his way towards Shamakhi. In the 10th of August he had begun the siege, and the city fell on 25 August. Lezgins sacked and looted the city, killing 5,000 people from the Shia population with an addition of 300 Russian merchants, The Lezgins also killed the local ruler Hasan-Ali Khan Daghestani. The deaths of the Russian merchants were used as a casus belli by Peter I to start the Russo-Persian War. This battle vastly expanded Haji Davud's control over the region. After the fall of Shamakhi the Beylerbeys of Ganja and Erivan had gathered an army of 30,000 warriors and began making their way towards Shamakhi. They set up camp west of the Kura River near Shaki, but were ambushed by Lezgin forces at night, resulting in heavy casualties. After the ambush near the Kura, Haji Davud captured the city of Barda and attempted to besiege Ganja but withdrew after the intervention of King Vakhtang VI of Kartli.

== Relations with the Ottoman Empire ==
While in Barda, Haji Davud began looking for allies. He had previously failed to reach agreements with the Russian Empire in the early years of his campaign, so he appealed to the Ottoman Sultan Ahmed III. He emphasized their shared Sunni Islamic orientation and presented himself as a defender of Sunni Islam in a struggle against the Safavid state, seeking to secure an official Ottoman alliance.

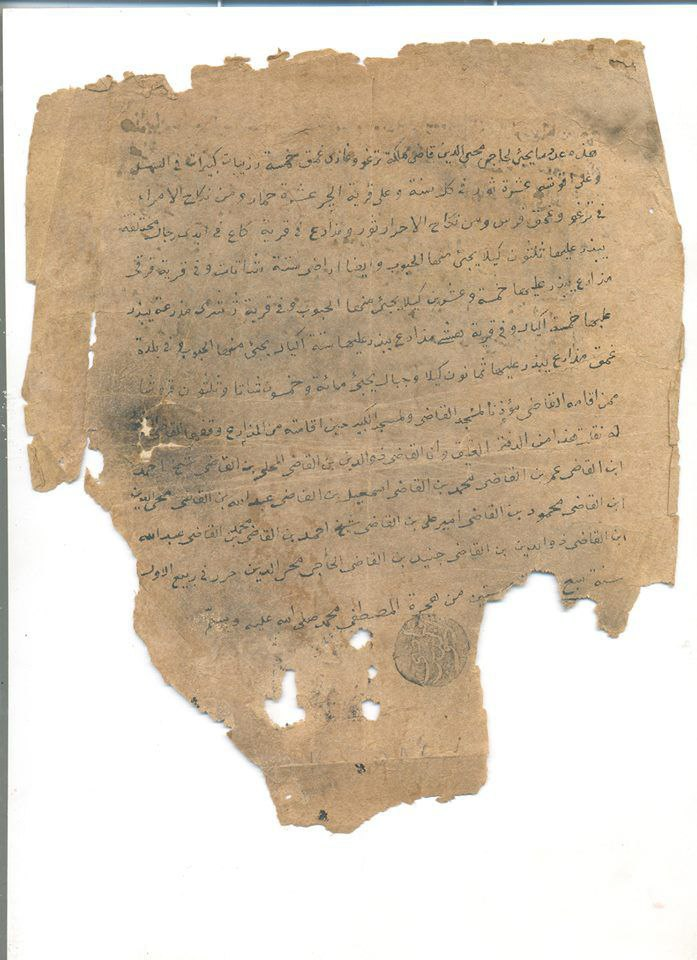
Fatwa of Haji Davud

In the spring of 1722, about ten Lezgin envoys travelled to Constantinople. The Russian diplomat Ivan Neplyuyev reported that they described the Lezgins as sharing the Ottomans' religion and regarding Sultan Ahmed III as their sovereign. They said coins were already being minted in his name and that he was named in Friday prayers. They also asked the Porte to send a pasha to help govern the newly found Lezgin Khanate. Wary of provoking Safavid Iran and Russia, the Ottoman government kept the talks secret.

According to Ottoman sources, a further delegation reached Istanbul in September 1722, requesting recognition of Haji Davud as ruler and Ottoman protection for Dagestan and Shirvan. Ottoman archival records indicate it had 14 members of religious and administrative standing. After negotiations the Ottomans decided to treat Dagestan and Shirvan as Ottoman territory under the category of "yurtluk ve ocaklık"

== Recognition of Davud Beg as Khan ==
In late December 1722, Ahmed III responded to Davud Beg's letter. He recognized Haji Davud as the rightful khan of Shirvan, Dagestan, and Lezgistan under the protection of the Sublime Porte, the Sultan had gifted Davud an Ottoman horsetail, a sword, and a robe. The elevation of Haji Davud caused discontent among his former ally Surkhay Khan, who had also contested the rule of Shirvan. Surkhay began diplomatic relations with the Russian Empire, and in 1725 he began raiding Haji Davud's khanate. This led to the collapse of the anti-Safavid coalition of Dagestan.

== Decline ==
Haji Davud Khan turned out to be an overly independent ruler, which contributed to tensions with the Sultan. The Sultan decided to strip Haji Davud of his title of Khan and give it to his rival, Surkhay Khan, who had previously been his ally. In 1724, the Ottoman Empire sent an expeditionary force into the territories controlled by Haji Davud, but the Ottoman army was defeated on the banks of the Kura River. In 1728, Haji Davud was invited by the Ottomans to peace talks in the city of Ganja. Upon his arrival with his family, he was captured and imprisoned and later exiled to Rhodes, while the rule of his khanate was transferred to Surkhay Khan.

== Death ==
Haji Davud lived the rest of his life in exile. He was first sent to Rhodes and later transferred to mainland Turkey in Gelibolu. The Ottomans treated him with respect as a former ally and provided him with a home. He died in 1738, aged 57–58.

== Legacy ==
Today Haji Davud is known as the national hero and liberator of the Lezgins amongst the local peoples of Dagestan and North Azerbaijan, He is also often depicted as the first Sunni Imam of the Caucasus.

- Haji Davud was depicted in a play of the Lezgin Theatre in the 1990s.
- The Lezgin Cultural preservation organization "FLNCA" also made a documentary video project about Haji Davud in 2019.
