= Sultan Ahmad Khan (Quba Khan) =

18th-century ruler of the Quba Khanate

Sultan Ahmad Khan of Quba

Quba Khan
- Reign: 1710–1720
- Predecessor: Ahmad Khan of Quba
- Successor: Haji Davud
- Born: c. 1700; Quba, Quba Khanate
- Died: 1720; Khudat, Quba Khanate
- Cause of death: Killed during the capture of Khudat by Haji Davud
- Wars and battles: Capture of Khudat; Lezgin campaign into Shirvan

Sultan Ahmed Khan of Quba (1700–1720) was the ruler of the Quba Khanate in the early 18th century. He succeeded his father Ahmed Khan and ruled during a period of political instability in the northeastern Caucasus, when the Safavid state was weakening and local rulers were occupied by regional uprisings. His authority was limited, and sources show that several districts did not always obey him.

Sultan Ahmed Khan was killed during the period of the Lezgin campaign into Shirvan led by Haji Davud, after which the Quba Khanate came under the authority of the Lezgins. His young son Husayn Ali Khan, later became ruler of Quba and established a new phase in the history of the khanate.

== Background ==
The Quba Khanate emerged as a semi-autonomous political entity in northeastern Azerbaijan during the late 17th century, when the region remained under Safavid control. Its rulers had authority over Quba and neighbouring districts.

Sultan Ahmed Khan belonged to the ruling family of Quba and succeeded his father Ahmed Khan. The origins of the Quba ruling house have been debated by historians. In a 2019 study, Bedirhan Emirulahovic Eskenderov argued that the khanate was governed by two successive dynasties rather than by one uninterrupted hereditary line, as suggested in earlier historical accounts.

== Reign ==
Sultan Ahmed Khan ruled during the period of Sunni Caucasian uprisings in the eastern Caucasus. The uprising led by Haji Davud became one of the main reasons for this unrest and threatened the authority of established rulers in the region.

A particularly valuable account of Sultan Ahmed Khan's position was recorded by Lieutenant A. I. Lopukhin, who travelled through the region in 1718 as part of the Russian embassy of Artemy Volynsky. Lopukhin reported that Sultan Ahmed Khan was approximately 14 years old and had inherited his position. According to the account, his authority extended over few settlements beyond Quba, and he maintained a force of approximately 500 men. Lopukhin also observed that much of the population paid little attention to the khan's orders.

This contemporary description suggests that Sultan Ahmed Khan's government faced considerable difficulties in maintaining authority over the surrounding territory. The neighbouring district of Khachmaz was already largely under Haji Davud's influence, illustrating the growing challenge posed by the uprising to the established rulers of the region.

== Death ==
Sultan Ahmed Khan died during the Lezgin capture of Khudat, the fortified residence of the Quba rulers. According to the account of Abbasgulu Bakikhanov in Gulistan-i Iram, Haji Davud captured the fortress during his campaign. Sultan Ahmed Khan attempted to escape the besieged stronghold but was killed along with several of his close associates.

The circumstances of his death remain disputed. One tradition attributes the killing to individuals accompanying Haji Davud, including his nephew Nazir, while another account implicates Sultan Ahmed Khan's father-in-law, Ahmed Khan of Kaitag, who allegedly sought to gain power for himself. The surviving accounts do not establish the circumstances beyond doubt.

== Dating ==
The chronology is also uncertain. Some historical accounts give 1718 as the year of Sultan Ahmed Khan's death, whereas others place it in 1720. Lopukhin's report establishes that Sultan Ahmed Khan was alive when the traveller visited Quba in 1718, making the precise date an issue requiring further examination of the original accounts.

Following his death the Quba Khanate passed under the authority of Haji Davud and the Lezgin Khanate. The region subsequently became involved in the wider struggle among local rulers, Safavid Iran, the Ottoman Empire and the Russian Empire for influence over the eastern Caucasus.

== Succession ==
Sultan Ahmed Khan's son, Husayn Ali Khan, survived the political upheaval and later became ruler of Quba. In 1726, supporters of the deceased khan brought the
