= Haji Gayb of Alpan =

18th-century Lezgin political figure

- Shinaz stele bearing a historical chronograph mentioning Ghaib Sultan-Murad, tentatively identified with Haji Gayb of Alpan.

Vizier of the Lezgin Khanate
- Born: Alpan, Quba, Azerbaijan
- Wars and battles: Lezgin campaign into Shirvan: Capture of Khudat
- Occupation: Political figure in the Lezgin Khanate

Haji Gayb of Alpan (also Haji Gayb Alpanli) was an 18th-century Lezgin political figure, who was one of the close companions of Haji Davud, and the vizier of the Lezgin Khanate. According to the Azerbaijani historian Abbasgulu Bakikhanov, Gayb was from the village of Alpan and served as a vizier of Haji Davud. Bakikhanov attributed Haji Gayb's participation in the Capture of Khudat.

His identity and political position remain uncertain. Historian Bedirkhan Eskenderov noted that no other established information about a vizier named Haji Gayb in Haji Davud's service was known to historians. Later research has proposed that Gayb may have been the same person as Ghaib Sultan-Murad al-Dagistani, mentioned in a historical chronograph recording the devastation of Mushkur in 1709–1710.

== Historical accounts ==
=== Background and position ===
The earliest known narrative reference to Haji Gayb appears in Bakikhanov's 19th-century historical work Gulistan-i Iram. Bakikhanov identifies him as a native of Alpan, a village in the Quba region, and describes him as a vizier of Haji Davud. According to the account, Gayb encouraged the inhabitants of Quba to rebel against their ruler, Sultan Ahmad Khan.

Eskenderov, examining the history of the Quba Khanate and the circumstances surrounding the overthrow of Sultan Ahmad Khan, observed that Gayb's identity is poorly documented. He noted that other historians referred to the individual as Haji Ali and that no independent historical information confirming the existence of a vizier named Haji Gayb in Haji Davud's administration had been established.

=== Uprising against Sultan Ahmad Khan ===
According to Bakikhanov, the sunni Lezgin inhabitants of Quba revolted against Sultan Ahmad Khan at the instigation of Haji Gayb. The uprising received military assistance from the Kaitag Utsmiate, whose forces were commanded by Ali Joruk. In 1720, Haji Davud led his army of Lezgins into Khudat, captured the fortress, the residence of the Quba rulers, and Sultan Ahmad Khan was killed together with several of his associates.

=== Possible identification with Ghaib Sultan-Murad ===
In a 2021 study of Arabic historical chronographs preserved on tombstones in the Dagestan villages of Shinaz and Gelhen, historian Zamir Zakariyaev examined an inscription recording the devastation of Mushkur by a person named Ghaib Sultan-Murad al-Dagistani in 1121 AH (1709–1710).

Zakariyaev proposed that Ghaib Sultan-Murad might be identical with Haji Gayb of Alpan mentioned by Bakikhanov. He noted that the recorded devastation of Mushkur and the activities attributed to Haji Davud's followers took place in the same historical region. The identification, however, remains a hypothesis rather than an established fact.

Zakariyaev also discussed a late-18th-century account by A. G. Serebrov, which identifies the killer of Sultan Ahmad Khan as a Quba bek and the khan's father-in-law, named Aji Naib. Zakariyaev suggested that this name could represent a confusion involving the Arabic names Ghaib and naib.
