= Lezgin nobility in Safavid Iran =

Lezgin aristocrats serving the Safavid state

Daghestani family Lezgin aristocracy
- Country: Safavid Iran
- Origin: Dagestan
- Founder: Ildirim Khan Shamkhal
- Final ruler: Fath-Ali Khan Daghestani
- Titles: Khan
- Members: Ildirim Khan Shamkhal; Safi Khan Lezgi (governor of Yerevan); Fath-Ali Khan Daghestani (grand vizier of Soltan Hoseyn); Aslan Khan Daghestani (Governor of Kuhgiluyeh); Hasan-Ali Khan Daghestani (governor of Shirvan and Shamakhi); Lotf-Ali Khan Daghestani (Governor of Fars)
- Traditions: Shia Islam; Sunni Islam

Lezgin nobility in Safavid Iran refers to Lezgin aristocrats and members of ruling families from Dagestan who served in the political, military and administrative institutions of the Safavid state. Several members of these families attained prominent positions and influence in the Safavid administration, including provincial governorships and high-ranking military offices. Among the most notable were Safi Khan Lezgi, governor of Erivan, and Fath-Ali Khan Daghestani, who served as grand vizier under Sultan Husayn from approximately 1715 until 1720.

A prominent aristocratic lineage associated with these officials descended from Ildirim Khan Shamkhal. His descendants included Alqas Mirza, better known as Safi Khan Lezgi, and his son Fath-Ali Khan Daghestani, who went on to be the grand vizier of Safavid Iran. The family maintained connections with the Shamkhal ruling lineage of Dagestan while becoming integrated into the Safavid administrative establishment.

== Background ==
The Safavid state maintained political relations with the principalities and aristocratic families of Dagestan throughout its rule in the Caucasus. Local rulers and aristocrats were incorporated into the Safavid political system through appointments, military service and relations with the royal court.

The Shamkhal, a hereditary title associated with the ruling house of Dagestan, was particularly important in these relations. Safavid rulers exercised influence over the appointment of the Shamkhal, although candidates were selected from local princely families.

== Prominent members ==
=== Ildirim Khan Shamkhal ===
Ildirim Khan Shamkhal, also known as Aldas (Ildas) Mirza Shamkhal, was an ancestor of the Daghestani family that produced several prominent Safavid officials. His son Alqas Mirza was sent to the Safavid court during the reign of Shah Safi (1629–1642), establishing the family's connections with the royal administration.

=== Safi Khan Lezgi ===
Alqas Mirza, better known as Safi Khan Lezgi or Safi-Qoli Khan, was a 17th-century Safavid official of Lezgin aristocratic origin. He was the son of Ildirim Khan Shamkhal and the father of Fath-Ali Khan Daghestani. He was sent to the Safavid court in Isfahan during the reign of Shah Safi, where he entered royal service.

Safi Khan subsequently held the governorship of Erivan (Chokhur-e Sa'd) from 1667 to 1674. His position in the Safavid administration established a prominent political role for his family, whose members continued to serve the dynasty in subsequent decades.

=== Fath-Ali Khan Daghestani ===
Fath-Ali Khan Daghestani (died after 1720) was a Safavid statesman who served as grand vizier (wazir-e a'zam) under Shah Sultan Husayn. He was the son of Alqas Mirza (Safi Khan Lezgi) and grandson of Ildirim Khan Shamkhal. According to Roger Savory, he belonged to a noble Lezgin family and was a Sunni Muslim.

Fath-Ali Khan rose through the Safavid administration and held several important offices before becoming grand vizier. His appointment to the vizierate took place around 1715. During his tenure, he exercised considerable influence over the affairs of the Safavid state and participated in diplomatic relations with European representatives, including the Dutch East India Company.

His position at court was opposed by several influential figures, particularly members of the Shiite religious establishment. In 1720, amid political intrigues and growing instability in the Caucasus, his opponents attempted to convince Shah Sultan Husayn to order his removal. On 8 December 1720, Fath-Ali Khan was blinded . He was subsequently sent to Shiraz, where he died in imprisonment at an uncertain date.

=== Other members of the family ===
Several relatives of Fath-Ali Khan also occupied important positions in the Safavid administration.

- Aslan Khan Daghestani – brother of Fath-Ali Khan, who served as a provincial governor, including in Kuhgiluyeh and Astarabad.
- Kalb-Ali Khan – another member of the family mentioned in accounts of Fath-Ali Khan's relatives.
- Hasan-Ali Khan Daghestani – a nephew of Fath-Ali Khan who served as governor of Shirvan and subsequently held an administrative position in Shamakhi. He was killed during the conflicts with the Sunni Lezgin forces of Haji Davud in the early 1720s, presumably near Shaki.
- Lotf-Ali Khan Daghestani – a relative of Fath-Ali Khan who served as governor of Fars. His precise relationship to Fath-Ali Khan is disputed in the historical literature; he has been described as his nephew, brother-in-law or paternal uncle.

== Decline ==
The political influence of the Daghestani family declined following the removal of Fath-Ali Khan in December 1720. His imprisonment and the arrest of his relative Lotf-Ali Khan weakened the family's position at the Safavid court.

The Safavid state subsequently faced increasing instability, particularly following the Afghan invasion and the fall of Isfahan in 1722. During this period, the political situation in Dagestan and Shirvan also changed considerably, with local Sunni Lezgin invasions challenging Safavid authority in the eastern Caucasus.
