= Irganay =

Irganay Ирганай Рихьуни
- Selo
- Location within Republic of Dagestan Location within Russia
- Coordinates: 42°38′N 46°55′E
- Country: Russia
- Region: Republic of Dagestan
- District: Untsukulsky District
- Time zone: UTC+3:00

Irganay (Russian: Ирганай; Avar: Рихьуни) is a rural locality (a selo) in Untsukulsky District, Republic of Dagestan, Russia. Population: 2,366 (2021 census); 1,799 (2002 census); 1,119 (1989 Soviet census). There are 12 streets.

== Geography ==
Irganay is located 9 km southeast of Shamilkala (the district's administrative centre) by road. Balakhani is the nearest rural locality.
