= Zirani =

Zirani Зирани
- Selo
- Location within Republic of Dagestan Location within Russia
- Coordinates: 42°37′N 46°56′E
- Country: Russia
- Region: Republic of Dagestan
- District: Untsukulsky District
- Time zone: UTC+3:00

Zirani (Russian: Зирани) is a rural locality (a selo) in Maydansky Selsoviet, Untsukulsky District, Republic of Dagestan, Russia. Population: 81 (2021 census); 77 (2002 census); 197 (1989 Soviet census).

== Geography ==
Zirani is located 21 km southeast of Shamilkala (the district's administrative centre) by road. Maydanskoye is the nearest rural locality.
