= Inkvalita =

Inkvalita Инквалита Инкӏвалитӏа
- Selo
- Location within Republic of Dagestan Location within Russia
- Coordinates: 42°42′N 46°41′E
- Country: Russia
- Region: Republic of Dagestan
- District: Untsukulsky District
- Time zone: UTC+3:00

Inkvalita (Russian: Инквалита; Avar: Инкӏвалитӏа) is a rural locality (a selo) in Ishtiburinsky Selsoviet, Untsukulsky District, Republic of Dagestan, Russia. Population: 42 (2010 census); 45 (2002 census); 58 (1989 Soviet census).

== Geography ==
Inkvalita is located 33 km west of Shamilkala (the district's administrative centre) by road. Kolob is the nearest rural locality.
