= Ishtiburi =

Ishtiburi Иштибури Иштӏибури
- Selo
- Location within Republic of Dagestan Location within Russia
- Coordinates: 42°40′N 46°42′E
- Country: Russia
- Region: Republic of Dagestan
- District: Untsukulsky District
- Time zone: UTC+3:00

Ishtiburi (Russian: Иштибури; Avar: Иштӏибури) is a rural locality (a selo) and the administrative center of Ishtiburinsky Selsoviet, Untsukulsky District, Republic of Dagestan, Russia. Population: 291 (2010 census); 379 (2002 census); 242 (1989 Soviet census).

== Geography ==
Ishtiburi is located 35 km west of Shamilkala (the district's administrative centre) by road. Kolob is the nearest rural locality.
