= Tsatanikh =

Tsatanikh Цатаних Цӏатӏанихъ
- Selo
- Location within Republic of Dagestan Location within Russia
- Coordinates: 42°40′N 46°43′E
- Country: Russia
- Region: Republic of Dagestan
- District: Untsukulsky District
- Time zone: UTC+3:00

Tsatanikh (Russian: Цатаних; Avar: Цӏатӏанихъ) is a rural locality (a selo) in Untsukulsky District, Republic of Dagestan, Russia. Population: 857 (2021 census); 706 (2002 census); 549 (1989 Soviet census). There are 5 streets.

== Geography ==
Tsatanikh is located 33 km west of Shamilkala (the district's administrative centre) by road. Ishtiburi is the nearest rural locality.
