= Kharachi =

Kharachi Харачи ХарачІи
- Selo
- Location within Republic of Dagestan Location within Russia
- Coordinates: 42°40′N 46°49′E
- Country: Russia
- Region: Republic of Dagestan
- District: Untsukulsky District
- Time zone: UTC+3:00

Kharachi (Russian: Харачи; Avar: ХарачІи) is a rural locality (a selo) in Untsukulsky District, Republic of Dagestan, Russia. Population: 410 (2021 census); 406 (2002 census); 287 (1989 Soviet census).

== Geography ==
Kharachi is located 17 km west of Shamilkala (the district's administrative centre) by road. Untsukul and Moksokh are the nearest rural localities.
