= Maydanskoye =

Maydanskoye Майданское Цӏияб Зирани
- Selo
- Location within Republic of Dagestan Location within Russia
- Coordinates: 42°36′N 46°57′E
- Country: Russia
- Region: Republic of Dagestan
- District: Untsukulsky District
- Time zone: UTC+3:00

Maydanskoye (Russian: Майданское; Avar: Цӏияб Зирани) is a rural locality (a selo) and the administrative center of Maydansky Selsoviet, Untsukulsky District, Republic of Dagestan, Russia. Population: 3,065 (2021 census); 1,870 (2002 census); 830 (1989 Soviet census). There are 41 streets.

== Geography ==
Maydanskoye is located 18 km southeast of Shamilkala (the district's administrative centre) by road. Zirani is the nearest rural locality.
