= Kakhabroso =

Kakhabroso Кахабросо Хъахӏабросо
- Selo
- Location within Republic of Dagestan Location within Russia
- Coordinates: 42°44′N 46°42′E
- Country: Russia
- Region: Republic of Dagestan
- District: Untsukulsky District
- Time zone: UTC+3:00

Kakhabroso (Russian: Кахабросо; Avar: Хъахӏабросо) is a rural locality (a selo) and the administrative center of Kakhabrosinsky Selsoviet, Untsukulsky District, Republic of Dagestan, Russia. Population: 795 (2010 census); 702 (2002 census); 500 (1989 Soviet census). There are 5 streets.

== Geography ==
Kakhabroso is located 29 km northwest of Shamilkala (the district's administrative centre) by road. Betli is the nearest rural locality.
