= Kolob, Untsukulsky District, Republic of Dagestan =

Kolob Колоб
- Selo
- Location within Republic of Dagestan Location within Russia
- Coordinates: 42°40′N 46°41′E
- Country: Russia
- Region: Republic of Dagestan
- District: Untsukulsky District
- Time zone: UTC+3:00

Kolob (Russian: Колоб) is a rural locality (a selo) in Ishtiburinsky Selsoviet, Untsukulsky District, Republic of Dagestan, Russia. Population: 241 (2010 census); 137 (2002 census); 167 (1989 Soviet census).

== Geography ==
Kolob is located 37 km west of Shamilkala (the district's administrative centre) by road. Ishtiburi is the nearest rural locality.
