= Battle near Shaki (1721) =

1721 battle between Lezgin forces and Safavid Iran

- Part of Lezgin campaign into Shirvan
Date	1721
Location	Shaki, present day Azerbaijan
Result	Lezgin victory

Belligerents
Lezgin Khanate	Safavid Iran

Commanders and leaders
Haji Davud	Hasan-Ali Khan Daghestani †

Strength
unknown	Larger than the Lezgis

Casualties and losses
Unknown	Very heavy losses

The Battle near Shaki was a battle in 1721 between Haji Davud aligned Lezgin forces and the army of Safavid Iran near Shaki, during the Lezgin campaign into Shirvan. The Safavid force was defeated, and its commander, Hasan-Ali Khan Daghestani, was killed alongside a large number of his troops.

== Background ==
During the early eighteenth century, Safavid authority in the eastern Caucasus weakened during the political instability and opposition to government taxation and administration. Lezgins allied with other Dagestani polities rose up against Safavid rule, and under the command of Haji Davud captured most of the Shirvan region, and even sacked the capital of the province, Shamakhi.

Hasan-Ali Khan Daghestani (who was a Shia of Lezgin origins himself) served as governor of Shirvan in 1718. He later became governor of Shamakhi in March 1720. During this period, Lezgin forces fought the Safavids over control over the region.

== Battle ==
During Hasan-Ali Khan's governorship of Shirvan, Lezgin forces advanced into the region and inflicted a decisive defeat on his army near Shaki. Hasan-Ali Khan subsequently led a larger force to oppose another Lezgin incursion. According to the account translated by Willem Floor and Hasan Javadi, the Lezgins attacked the Safavid troops at dawn in Shaki. Hasan-Ali Khan and many of his soldiers were killed in the leading to a heavy defeat.

== Aftermath ==
The defeat further weakened Safavid authority in Shirvan during the Lezgin campaign. In August 1721, forces led by Haji Davud captured Shamakhi, the administrative capital of Shirvan. The capture was a major victory for the Lezgins in the campaign, although the dating between the capture of Shamakhi and death of Hasan Ali Khan, do not indicate if the battle in shaki was before or after the fall of the city.
