= Arakani =

Arakani Аракани ГьаракIуни
- Selo
- Location within Republic of Dagestan Location within Russia
- Coordinates: 42°36′N 46°59′E
- Country: Russia
- Region: Republic of Dagestan
- District: Untsukulsky District
- Time zone: UTC+3:00

Arakani (Russian: Аракани; Avar: ГьаракIуни) is a rural locality (a selo) and the administrative center of Arakansky Selsoviet, Untsukulsky District, Republic of Dagestan, Russia. Population: 1,640 (2010 census); 1,735 (2002 census); 1,178 (1989 Soviet census). There are 23 streets.

== Geography ==
Arakani is located 26 km southeast of Shamilkala (the district's administrative centre) by road. Maydanskoye is the nearest rural locality.
