= Guba Fortress =

- Quba qalası (Azerbaijani)
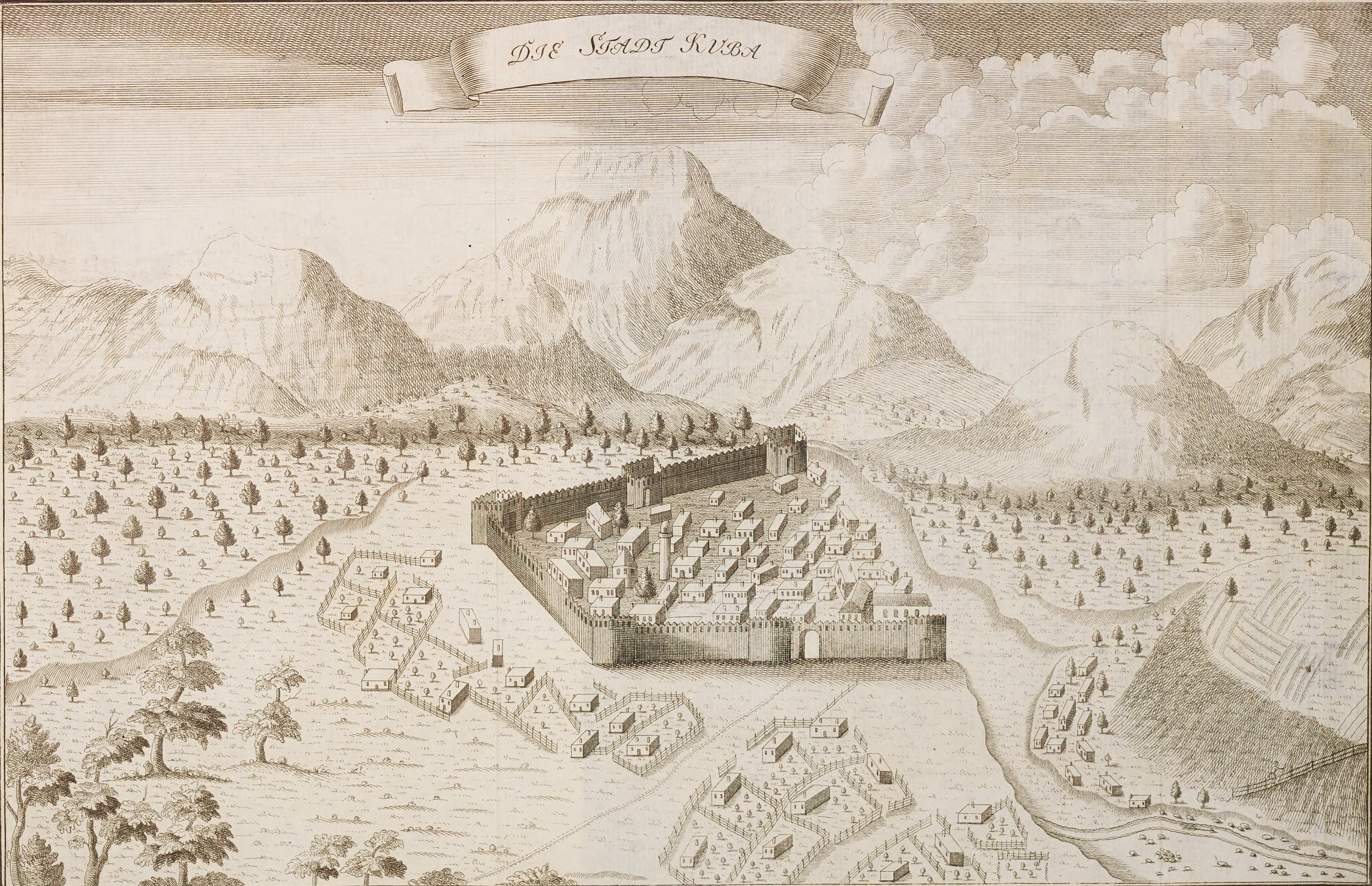
- Guba Fortress and Qırmızı Qəsəbə by Samuel Gottlieb Gmelin, 1774
- Location: Azerbaijan

History
- Built: 18th century

Site notes
- Area: Quba

Guba Fortress refers to the fortress walls that once surrounded the historical center of the city of Quba. It was constructed in 1747 after Huseynali Khan of Quba moved the capital of the Quba Khanate from Khudat to Quba. Following the incorporation of the khanate into the Russian Empire, the fortress lost its strategic importance and was used by the local Russian garrison.

Starting in 1868, military fortresses in the South Caucasus began to be dismantled. In 1870, a plan was developed to demolish the Quba fortress walls and build additional residential neighborhoods in their place. Shortly thereafter, the demolition of the fortress walls and new construction work began.

The fortress city of Quba stretched along the upper terrace of the Qudyal River in a west–east direction and was surrounded by fortress walls constructed from unfired bricks. These walls were approximately 3–4 sazhen (6.4–8.5 meters) in height, 1 sazhen (2.13 meters) in width, and extended 400 sazhen (852 meters) in length and 130 sazhen (277 meters) in width. The fortress walls featured three gates.

== History ==
Although Quba is an ancient settlement, its strategic significance increased in 1747 when Hüseynali Khan of Quba moved his residence from Khudat to Quba, and it was during this period that the fortress walls were constructed. Starting in 1811, significant reinforcement work was carried out on the Quba fortress. The western and eastern sides of the fortress walls were strengthened with flèches, and a bastion was constructed at the center of the southern wall. Additionally, all the old walls were restored and repaired.

During the Russia-Iranian war, the siege of Quba Fortress by the Iranians, which lasted until 1826, and the 1837 Quba uprising did not contribute to the strengthening or further development of the fortress. However, in 1834, a construction project was approved for the Quba Fortress, aimed at "ensuring the proper construction of neighborhoods and making the streets more accessible for use by the garrison stationed in Quba." By the late 1830s, the fortress had lost its strategic importance. The trenches surrounding the fortress walls were filled in, and fruit orchards were planted around the city. At that time, Count Vasilchikov wrote, "The city of Quba is almost undefended; the fortress walls that once surrounded the city are now partially collapsed, both due to the passage of time and the city's re-planning efforts."

In the 1840s, after the stabilization of authority, organized urban planning and construction activities began in Quba. Within a short period, the number of brick and stone buildings in the city reached 780, which was more than double the number of similar buildings in Lankaran at that time (298).

After 1868, the process of dismantling military fortresses in the South Caucasus began. Fortress walls were demolished, trenches were filled in, and this initiative aimed at integrating the fortress and surrounding areas also affected the Quba Fortress. In 1870, a plan was developed to demolish the fortress walls and create additional residential neighborhoods in their place. Shortly after, the demolition of the fortress walls and new construction projects commenced.

== Description ==
Referring to the 1811 military plan of Quba Fortress, Sh. Fatullayev noted that the fortress city stretched along the upper terrace of the Qudyalchay River in a west–east direction. It was surrounded by fortress walls made of unfired bricks, with a height of 3–4 sazhen (6.4–8.5 meters), a width of 1 sazhen (2.13 meters), a length of 400 sazhen (852 meters), and a width of 130 sazhen (277 meters). The fortress walls had three gates.

According to the main plan of Quba Fortress, three main streets led to the three gates, all originating from the square where the Khan's palace was located. The layout of neighborhoods varied depending on the property owners. Water supply was provided via clay pipes that drew water from the river. On the lower terrace of the Qudyalchay River's left bank, the Jewish quarter was located, featuring buildings and synagogues constructed in a free-form plan. Unlike the fortresses of Ganja and Shaki, Quba Fortress did not have an inner fortress (naringala) or a Khan's palace.

In 1842, I. Berezin, who visited Quba, wrote, "The streets are so astonishingly convoluted that finding your way in Quba is more difficult than in London."

In the second half of the 19th century, like Baku, the city of Quba was primarily located within its fortress walls, while the suburb was considered the outskirts. However, unlike the Baku fortress, Quba underwent significant changes, with nine well-organized and straight streets laid out inside the fortress. A large Bazaar Square was created in the area of the Quba Khan's palace and the square in front of it, turning the area into the city's commercial hub.

By the 1860s, a large caravanserai had been constructed on the northern side of the city's central square. The old Juma Mosque was demolished and replaced with a smaller octagonal mosque. The Juma Mosque, with its high helmet-shaped dome, became the main landmark indicating the city's center. Across from the caravanserai, on the southern side of the square, was the house of General-Major Jafarqulu Agha Bakikhanov (the brother of Abbasqulu Agha Bakikhanov). Behind this house stood a larger, new caravanserai. The eastern and western parts of the square were lined with commercial shops.

The main street of the fortress began at the Baku Gate and extended to the Qamsar Gate, dividing the fortress area into two parts. Along this street were the buildings of local government authorities, houses of local landowners and nobility, as well as a pharmacy building.

== See also ==
- List of castles and fortresses in Azerbaijan

== Sources ==
- Фатуллаев, Ш. С. (1974). Градостроительное развитиегорода Кубы в конце XVIII и XIX вв [Urban development of the city of Quba in the late 18th and 19th centuries] (in Russian). Baku: Azərbaycan SSR Elmlər Akademiyasının Xəbərləri (Ədəbiyyat, dil və incəsənət seriyası), №1 [News of the Academy of Sciences of the Azerbaijan SSR (Literature, language and art series), No. 1].
