= Capture of Barda =

1721 battle between Lezgins and Safavid alligned forces

- Part of Lezgin campaign into Shirvan
Date	Autumn 1721
Location	Barda, modern day Azerbaijan, Kura river
Result	Lezgin victory: Safavids suffer great loss at battle near Kura
Territorial changes	Barda captured by Haji Davud and incorporated into the Lezgin Khanate

Belligerents
Lezgin Khanate; Lezgin Bekdoms	Safavid Iran; Eirevan Beylerbeylik; Ganja Beylerbeylik; Armenians

Commanders and leaders
Haji Davud; Kurban Butvi	Ughurlu Khan; Aligulu Khan; Mehrali Khan Isayi of Barda

Strength
Unknown	Up to 30,000 (reported)

Casualties and losses
Unknown	Very heavy losses most of the army fled

The Capture of Barda was one of the key victories of Haji Davud during the Lezgin campaign into Shirvan, In autumn 1721. It followed a Lezgin victory over a Safavid provincial army near the Kura River, in the sorroudings of the historic city of Partav, also known as Barda. According to historian Daniyal Kidirniyazov, the victorious Lezgins subsequently captured Barda.

== Background ==
During the early eighteenth century, the Safavid Empire faced serious political instability. Its authority in the eastern Caucasus weakened as local Sunni Caucasian uprisings spread through Shirvan and Dagestan. Haji Davud emerged as one of the principal leaders of the anti-Safavid campaign, and untied the fragmented Lezgin Bekdoms under his rule, to raise arms against Safavid rule in the eastern Caucasus.

In August 1721, 15,000 Lezgin tribesmen led by Haji Davud captured Shamakhi, the principal administrative centre of Shirvan. The fall of the city alarmed the Safavid provincial authorities. According to Hasan-Jalalian, the rulers of Ganja and Erivan informed Shah Sultan Husayn of the defeat and assembled their forces at Partav, on the Kura River, with the intention of confronting the Lezgins.

The rulers of the two provinces were joined by local district governors, nobles and other military contingents. The contemporary chronicle describes the assembled force as numbering up to 30,000 men. Shah Sultan Husayn did not send a central imperial army to support them, as he was preoccupied with the military situation around Kandahar.

== Battle at the Kura River ==
The Safavid forces assembled near Partav, close to the Kura River. Their army included the contingents of the Ganja and Erivan administrations and forces supplied by subordinate local rulers.

Hasan-Jalalian describes the Lezgins as approaching the river quietly and gathering on the opposite bank. During the night, they crossed the Kura in silence and approached the enemy camp. According to the chronicler, the opposing soldiers had spent the night feasting and were unprepared when the attack began.

The Lezgins attacked before the assembled troops could properly organise their defence. The surprise assault broke the enemy formation and caused the Safavid-aligned army to retreat. The Lezgins pursued the fleeing troops towards the foothills of Artsakh, reaching the area of the Trdu River and the Khachen valley.

The chronicler records that the Lezgin forces took booty and subsequently returned to their own territories. He identifies the engagement as having taken place in autumn 1170 according to the Armenian calendar, corresponding to 1721.

Historian Daniyal Kidirniyazov also describes the defeat of the Ganja and Erivan forces at the Kura crossing. His account states that the rebels rapidly crossed the river, defeated the provincial troops and then captured Barda.

== Capture of Barda ==
Following the defeat of the Safavid provincial forces, the rebels reportedly advanced on Barda and captured the city. Kidirniyazov records the capture as a consequence of the victory at the Kura river.

== Armenian resistance to the Lezgin invasions ==
Years after the capture of Barda, the forces of Haji Davud faced resistance from the Armenian communities in Karabakh, Ganja and neighbouring territories.

In a petition addressed to Russian Emperor Peter I in March 1723, Armenian representatives described repeated incursions by Lezgin forces and other regional groups. The petition alleged that raiding forces numbering between 50,000 and 60,000 had devastated settlements in Ganja, Barda and surrounding districts, killing inhabitants and carrying captives towards Dagestan.

The document names Isayi of Barda, Sergei of Charaberd and Osip of Ganja as Armenian leaders who organised armed resistance. According to the petition, they assembled approximately 12,000 warriors and fought against the invading forces. The account also mentions military assistance from the ruler of Tiflis.
