= Balakhani, Republic of Dagestan =

Balakhani Балахани Балахьуни
- Selo
- Location within Republic of Dagestan Location within Russia
- Coordinates: 42°37′N 46°53′E
- Country: Russia
- Region: Republic of Dagestan
- District: Untsukulsky District
- Time zone: UTC+3:00

Balakhani (Russian: Балахани; Avar: Балахьуни) is a rural locality (a selo) and the administrative center of Balakhansky Selsoviet, Untsukulsky District, Republic of Dagestan, Russia. Population: 2,164 (2010 census); 1,555 (2002 census); 1,134 (1989 Soviet census). There are 11 streets.

== Geography ==
Balakhani is located 28 km south of Shamilkala (the district's administrative centre) by road. Irganay is the nearest rural locality.
