= Quba Khanate =

Independent principality from 1747–1806, part of modern-day Azerbaijan

Quba Khanate خانات قبه
- 1700–1806
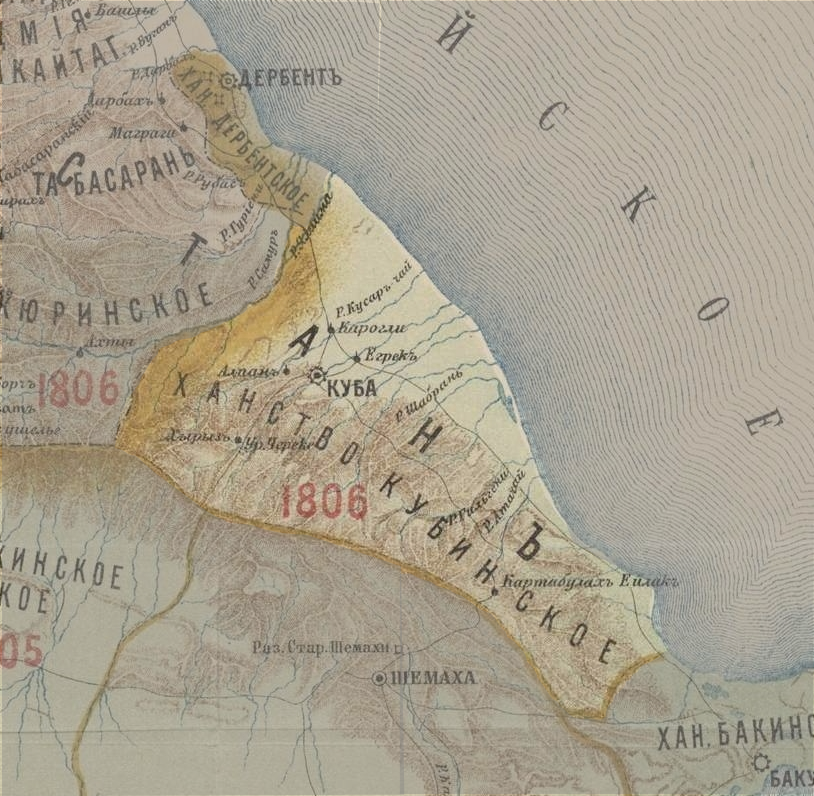
- Map of Quba Khanate in 1806 (according to a 1902 Russian map)
- Status: Khanate under Iranian suzerainty
- Capital: Khudat (1700-1720); Quba (1747)
- Common languages: Persian (official); Lezgian; Azerbaijani; Tat
- History
  - Established: 1700
  - Disestablished: 1806
Preceded by	Succeeded by
Safavid Iran	Russian Empire

The Quba Khanate (also spelled Qobbeh; Persian: خانات قبه, romanized: Khānāt-e Qobbeh) was one of the most significant semi-independent khanates that existed from 1747 to 1806, under Iranian suzerainty. It bordered the Caspian Sea to the east, Derbent Khanate to the north, Shaki Khanate to the west, and Baku and Shirvan Khanates to the south. In 1755 it captured Salyan from the Karabakh Khanate.

== History ==
Although the Quba Khanate officially appeared on the map in 1747, it has been noted to be existing from the 17th century within the authority of the Safavid empire, in 1718 Lopukhin traveled to the Quba Khanate and noted that unlike other polities within the Safavid sphere, the Quba Khans were appointed locally through their own dynasty, an early documentary evidence tells us that in 1710 Sultan Ahmed Khan became the Quba Khan. The center of the Quba Khans was Khudat during that period.

in 1720 a Lezgin ruler by the name Haji Davud led his campaign into Shirvan, in the Early stages of his campaign he besieged Khudat and stormed the city, killing Sultan Ahmed Khan, and many of his relatives, after this Quba came under the authority of the Lezgin Khanate up until the liberation by Nader Shah.

The Quba Khanate regained independence in 1747 from the collapsing Afsharid empire.

=== Lezgin Origins ===
The origins of the khans of Quba is highly debated, According to Ilya Nikolaevich in his works on Journey through Dagestan and Transcaucasia, the Khanate was formed by a Lezgin nobleman Lezgi-Ahmad who built the settlement of Khudat, the author listed the Quba Khanate as part of Dagestan region stating "The Quba Khanate is one of the newest in Dagestan"

=== Qeytag origins ===
Another theory suggests that they were from the Qeytaq tribe, which was divided into two branches the Majales and the Yengikend. The khans of Quba were descended from Hosein Khan of the Majales branch, who was given the governorship of Saleyan and Quba by Shah Soleiman (r. 1666–1694) in the second half of the 1680s.

== Territorial peak and downfall ==
The khanate achieved its greatest prominence under Fath-Ali Khan, whose governorship lasted from 1758 to 1789. He seized Derbent and divided Shirvan with Hosein Khan of Shaki.

After Fath Ali Khan's death, the khanate's influence declined. As a result of Mohammad Khan Qajar's conquests and the devastation they brought, the Alliance of Northern khanates disintegrated. The khanate was conquered by Russia in 1806 and was fully incorporated into the newly created Shamakha Governorate by 1846.

== Population ==
The Quba Khanate was mainly populated by Tatars (later known as Azerbaijanis) and Lezgins. It was also populated by Armenians, Tats and Mountain Jews.

== List of khans ==
The khans of the Quba khanate were the following:

- 1710-1720 Sultan Ahmed Khan
- 1747–1758: Hossein-Ali Khan
- 1758–1789: Fath-Ali Khan
- 1789–1791: Ahmad Khan
- 1791–1806: Shaykh Ali Khan

== See also ==
- Guba Fortress
- Khanates of the Caucasus
- Russian conquest of the Caucasus

== Sources ==
- Bournoutian, George (2016). "Prelude to War: The Russian Siege and Storming of the Fortress of Ganjeh, 1803–4". Iranian Studies. 50 (1). Taylor & Francis: 107–124. doi:10.1080/00210862.2016.1159779. S2CID 163302882.
- Bournoutian, George (2021). From the Kur to the Aras: A Military History of Russia's Move into the South Caucasus and the First Russo-Iranian War, 1801–1813. Brill. ISBN 978-9004445154.
- Floor, Willem (2010). "Who were the Shamkhal and the Usmi?". Zeitschrift der Deutschen Morgenländischen Gesellschaft. 160 (2): 341–381. JSTOR 10.13173/zeitdeutmorggese.160.2.0341. (registration required)
- Minorsky, Vladimir (1970). Bosworth, Clifford Edmund (ed.). Hudūd al-ʿĀlam: The Regions of the World: a Persian geography, 372 A.H.–982 A.D. Second edition. Luzac & Co. ISBN 978-0718902018.
- Tsutsiev, Arthur (2014). Atlas of the Ethno-Political History of the Caucasus. Yale University Press. ISBN 978-0300153088.
