= Ahmad Khan of Quba =

18th-century statesman

Khan of Quba
- Reign: 1789 - 1791
- Predecessor: Fatali Khan
- Successor: Shaykh Ali Khan
- Born: 1769; Quba, Quba Khanate
- Died: 1791 (aged 21–22); Quba, Quba Khanate
- Father: Fatali Khan
- Mother: Tuti Bike of Kaitag

Ahmad Khan of Quba (1769–1791) was a Khan of Quba and a successor of Fatali Khan who managed to dominate Derbent, Baku, Talysh and Shirvan Khanates, as well as Salyan Sultanate during much of his reign.

== Early life ==
He was born in 1769 to Fatali Khan and Tuti Bike, sister of Amir Hamza, Utsmi of Kaitags. He was named after his grandfather Ahmad Khan, Utsmi of Kaitags. At the age of 18, he was married to Kichik Bike, daughter of Tarki shamkhal Bammat II in 1787 as part of his father's marriage diplomacy. As his father expected successor, he was already involved in state affairs. According to a document, he granted a waqf status to Pir Khidir Zinda in 1787.

== Reign ==
His Fath Ali Khan fell ill after receiving submission of Javad Khan, left for Baku to stay with his sister died there on 2 April [O.S. 22 March] 1789. On May 30, general Tekeli reported to Russian President of the College of War Grigory Potemkin that, associates of the khan concealed his death in order to secure his succession.

Ahmad Khan died in March 1791 after ruling the khanate mere 2 years.

== Sources ==
- Bournoutian, George (2021). From the Kur to the Aras: A Military History of Russia's Move into the South Caucasus and the First Russo-Iranian War, 1801–1813. Brill. ISBN 978-9004445154.
- Hajiev, Vladlen (1967). Danialov, Hajiali (ed.). История Дагестана [History of Dagestan] (PDF) (in Russian). Vol. 1. Moscow: Nauka.
- Leviatov, Vadim (1948). Очерки из истории Азербайджана в XVIII веке [Essays from the history of Azerbaijan in the 18th century] (PDF) (in Russian). Baku: Publishing House of the Academy of Sciences of Azerbaijan SSR.
- Markova, Olga (1966). Россия, Закавказье и международные отношения в XVIII веке [Russia, Transcaucasia and international relations in the 18th century] (in Russian). Moscow: Nauka.
