= Pyotr Butkov =

Russian historian (1775 - 1857)

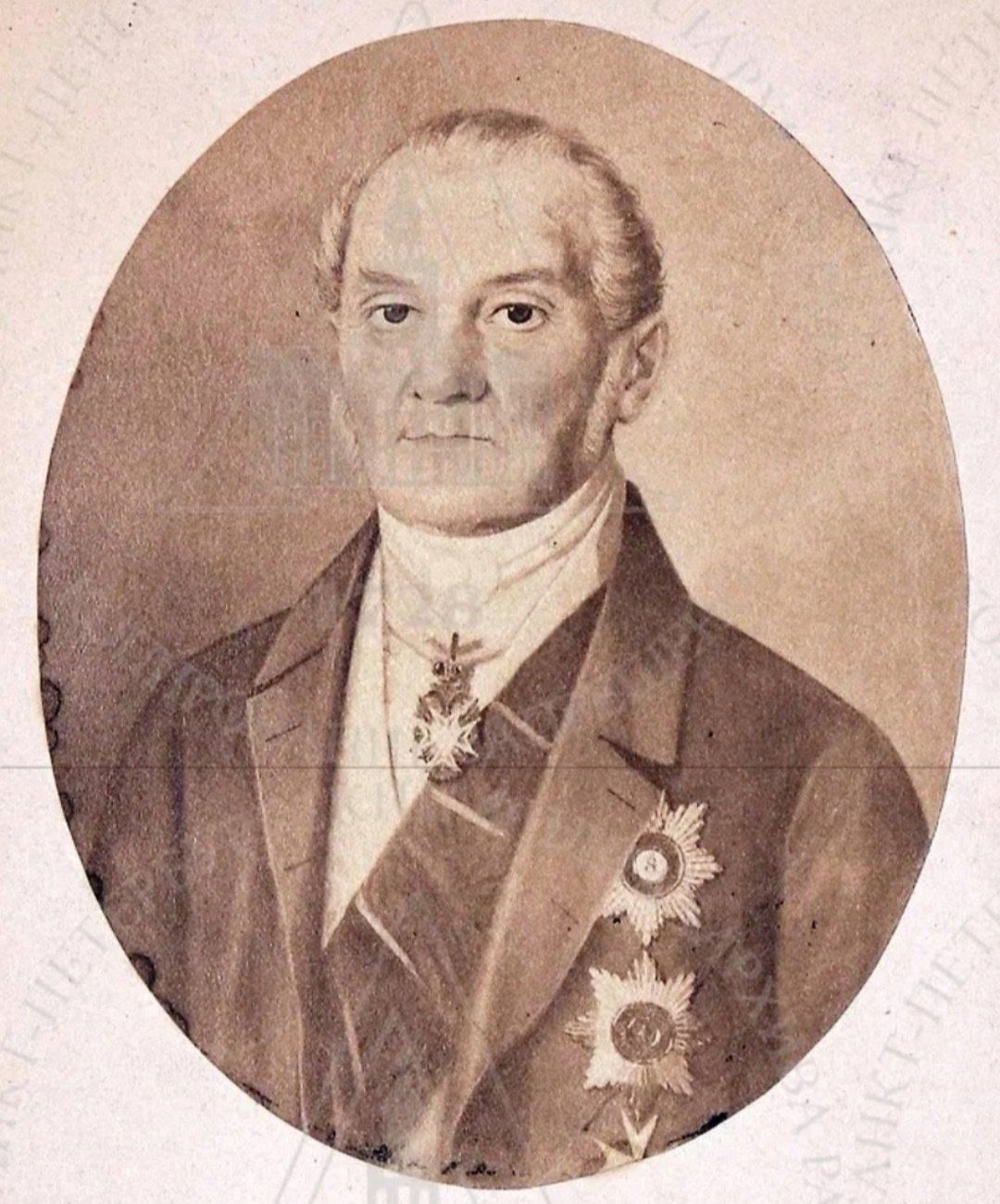
- Born: December 29, 1775; Osinovo, Starobelsky Uyezd, Kharkov Governorate, Russian Empire
- Died: January 12, 1857 (aged 81); Saint Petersburg, Russian Empire
- Burial place: Volkovo Cemetery
- Occupation: Historian

Pyotr Grigoryevich Butkov ( December 29, 1775 – January 12, 1857) was a Russian historian of the Russian Empire in the 19th century, full member of the Saint Petersburg Academy of Sciences, statesman, Actual Privy Councillor, and Senator.

== Biography ==
He was born on 29 December [O.S. 17] 1775 in the sloboda of Osinovo, Starobelsky Uyezd, Kharkov Governorate. He had an elder brother, Mikhail.

He began his service in the Vladimir Dragoon Regiment. While on military service in the Caucasus, Butkov began collecting materials on the history of Georgia and Russia's relations with Persia. During the years of Georgia's annexation (1801–1802), he served as head of the chancellery of Commander-in-Chief Karl Knorring.

In 1803, Butkov retired from service and, leaving the Caucasus, settled in Saint Petersburg, where he continued his studies on the history of Georgia.

In 1805, Butkov re-entered service and was attached to the Heraldry Office; in 1809 he was appointed auditor-general's lieutenant to the commander-in-chief of the Moldavian Army, Field Marshal Prince Alexander Prozorovsky, and under the latter's successors, Prince Bagration and Count Nikolay Kamensky, he also managed the field chancellery and conducted correspondence concerning the army's operations and movements.

In 1811, Butkov left service due to illness and remained in retirement until 1820, when he was appointed Director of Schools of Voronezh Governorate; in 1823 he was appointed an official for special assignments under the Finnish Governor-General Count Zakrevsky.

In 1828 he was appointed a member of the Council of the Ministry of Internal Affairs, and in that capacity twice administered the ministry in the absence of the minister; in 1841 he was elected an academician, and in 1849 was appointed Senator.

He was awarded the ranks of Actual State Councillor (1826), Privy Councillor (1836), and Actual Privy Councillor (1856).

He died on 24 December [O.S. 12] 1857. He was buried at Volkovo Orthodox Cemetery. The grave has been lost.

A cave in the Northern Caucasus, near Novosvododnaya (Adygea), is named after Butkov..

== Bibliography ==
- Three Ancient Treaties of the Rus with the Norwegians and Swedes (Saint Petersburg, 1837)
- A Defense of the Russian Chronicle of Nestor Against the Attacks of Skeptics (Saint Petersburg, 1840)
- On Finnish Words in the Russian Language and on Russian and Finnish Words Sharing the Same Meaning (Saint Petersburg, 1842)
- An Explanation of Old Russian Linear and Road Measures (Saint Petersburg, 1844)
- A Reply to a New Question about Nestor, the Russian Chronicler (Saint Petersburg, 1850)
- Materials for a New History of the Caucasus, from 1722 to 1803: in 3 parts (Saint Petersburg, 1869)
  - Part 1
  - Part 2
  - Part 3: Chronological and Alphabetical Indices

== Awards ==
- Order of St. John of Jerusalem (1800)
- Order of St. Anna, 4th class (1800)
- Order of St. Vladimir, 2nd class (1828)
- Order of St. Anna, 1st class (1830)
- Imperial Crown to the Order of St. Anna, 1st class (1831)
- Order of the White Eagle (1840)
- Order of St. Alexander Nevsky (1853)

== Family ==
He was married to Varvara Ivanovna Korneyeva (15.12.1792–26.01.1878). Their children:

- Vladimir (1813–1881)
- Yekaterina (22.09.1814–07.04.1843), married Hyacinth Sukovkin.
- Konstantin (19.06.1816–?)
- Yelena (19.06.1816–1887)
- Alexander (1817–?)

== Sources ==
- Список гражданским чинам первых IV классов. Исправлен по 20-е ноября 1856 г [List of Civil Ranks of the First Four Classes. Corrected as of 20 November 1856]. Saint Petersburg: Printing House of the 2nd Department of His Imperial Majesty's Own Chancellery. 1856. pp. 60–61.
