= Husayn Ali Khan (Quba khan) =

First Khan of Quba (1726-1758)

Khan of Quba
- Reign: 1726 – 1758
- Predecessor: Sultan Ahmad Khan
- Successor: Fath Ali Khan
- Born: c. 1709; Khudat, Safavid Shirvan,
- Died: 1758 (aged 48–49); Quba, Quba Khanate
- Burial: Khudat, Quba Khanate

Husayn Ali Khan (Persian: حسینعلی خان, romanized: Ḥusayn ʿAlī Khān) was a Khan of Quba ruling from 1726 until his death in 1758.

== Early life and background ==
He was born in 1709 to Sultan Ahmad Khan, Safavid governor of Quba and his wife Hajar khanum, daughter of Haji Gaib of Alpaut, according to genealogical table of Adolf Berzhe. Despite paternally descended from Kaitag Utsmiate who were Sunni, both of Husayn Ali's parents were Shia. His great-grandfather Husayn Khan converted to Shia Islam during reign of Suleiman I of Safavids who granted him lands around Quba and Salyan as hereditary fiefs. However, his father was killed during Hajji Davud rebellion against Safavids in 1711. Two-year-old Husayn Ali was saved thanks to a loyal sheikh who secretly smuggled him away and raised him hidden in a mountain village caller Tahirjar near Samur river.

== Reign ==
He was reported to be surfaced again in 1722, following the Russian Peter the Great's Caspian campaign, according to Samuel Gmelin. Gmelin even reported that he was present next to Peter the Great, who announced him as the ruler of Quba. However, since Husayn's son, Fath-Ali was Gmelin's main interlocutor, the khan may have exaggerated the information as legitimizing effort. Earliest record of Husayn Ali Khan's submission to Russia dates to 1726. A document kept in the Archive of Foreign Policy of the Russian Empire states that on 20 October [N.S. 31 October] 1726, Huseyn Ali arrived in Derbent, declared his acceptance of Russian protection and took an oath of allegiance. He not only swore to always remain loyal, but also undertook to provide every kind of assistance to Russian troops in the struggle against their enemies, and to provide quarters for Russian soldiers. Husayn Ali also promised to maintain no relations with Russia's open or secret enemies. The Supreme Privy Council in St. Petersburg took up the matter on 5 December [N.S. 16 December] 1726. According to the council's journal, Privy Councillor Makarov reported that Huseyn Ali had submitted a request to be formally confirmed as khan of Kuba in place of his father. After deliberation, the council resolved to instruct Vasily Vladimirovich Dolgorukov, commander of Russian forces in the Caspian provinces, that if Husayn Ali's lands remained within the Russian zone as defined by the treaty with the Ottomans — rather than falling within the Turkish sphere — he should be granted the title of khan, as his father had been styled before him.

As the greater part of the Kuba Khanate remained on the Russian side during the border demarcation, Husayn Ali Khan was confirmed as Khan of Quba. Since the khan was minor at the time, regents were appointed to govern in his name during his minority: Afrasiab served as naib (deputy governor), and Faramaz as nazir (state treasurer). Both Johann Herber and Pyotr Butkov note than Husayn Ali was at the age of 8 by this time.

Husayn Ali submitted to Safavids when Tahmaspqoli Khan started reconquest of Caucasus against Ottomans in 1734, due to which in return, he was granted Salyan as his patrimony. Following withdrawal of Nader, Husayn Ali faced a rebellion by anti-Iranian forces. According to Mirza Hasan Alkadari, he was besieged by rebels in Khudat fortress until he was relieved by governor of Derbent, the Derbent community and Shamkhal Khaspulat of Tarki, who dispersed the Lezgis who had risen against him.

Following murder of Nader Shah in 1747, Husayn Ali moved his capital from Khudat to banks of Qudyal where started to construct his new capital Guba Fortress. He also permitted Jews to settle on the opposite bank of the Qudyal and settlement eventually evolved into Red Village.

His neighbor, Nader's appointed governor of Shirvan, Hajji Mohammad Ali Khan was besieged in 1755 in his capital New Shamakhi by Hajji Chalabi of Shaki Khanate, who claimed to be ruler of Shirvan. Hajji Mohammad in his turn appealed to Husayn Ali for support. The latter arrived with 3,000 strong army, supported by Amir Hamza, Utsmi of Kaitags who came with 500 men. Allies won the battle against Shaki forces despite being outnumbered. After a three-day stay in New Shamakhi, Husayn Ali returned to his headquarters and, next year he sent his son Fath-Ali Agha with an army to reclaim the Salyan from his relative Ibrahim Khan of Rudbar.

According to Bakikhanov (who was also his great-grandson), Husayn Ali Khan died in 1758. He characterizes Husayn Ali as "a courageous and highly motivated emir" and as a person who "always had the country's prosperity and the peace of his subjects in mind." Berzhe puts his death in 1757. He was buried in Khudat and was succeeded by his only son Fath Ali.

== Family ==
He had two wives with whom fathered three children:

- Parijahan Khanum — daughter of Ahmad the Great, who was captured by Nader Shah and was given to Husayn Ali. According to Bakikhanov, she later "lost her mind" and was sent to her nephew, Amir Hamza.
  - Fath-Ali Khan (1736−1789) — Khan of Quba
- Unnamed daughter of Husein Khan of Rudbar — married in 1737
  - Khadija Bike (1739−1803) — married to Malik Muhammad Khan of Baku.
  - Fatma Bike — married to Muhammad Riza Khan of Shirvan in 1779.

== Sources ==
- Bakikhanov, Abbasgulu (2009). The Heavenly Rose-garden: A History of Shirvan & Daghestan. Mage Publishers. ISBN 978-1-933823-27-0.
- Butkov, Pyotr (1869). Материалы для новой истории Кавказа, с 1722 по 1803 год [Materials for the new history of the Caucasus, from 1722 to 1803] (in Russian). Vol. 1. Saint Petersburg: Saint Petersburg Academy of Sciences.
- Gmelin, Samuel Gottlieb; Floor, Willem (2007). Travels through Northern Persia, 1770-1774. Washington, DC: Mage Publishers. pp. xiv. ISBN 978-1-933823-15-7.
- Dubrovin, Nikolai. Протоколы, журналы и указы Верховного тайного совета 1726-1730 гг [Minutes, journals and decrees of the Supreme Privy Council of 1726-1730] (in Russian). Vol. 2.
