= Samur =

Samur may refer to:

== People ==
- Samur Gunj (1380s-c.1455), a daughter of Elbeg Nigülesügchi Khan and his senior wife Kobeguntai

== Places ==
- Qaleh Samur, a village in Gavork-e Sardasht Rural District, in the Central District of Sardasht County, West Azerbaijan Province, Iran
- Samur, Azerbaijan, a village and municipality in the Qusar Rayon of Azerbaijan
- Samur (river), a river in Azerbaijan and Russia
- Samur, Vezirköprü, a village in the Vezirköprü district of Samsun Province, Turkey
- Samur–Absheron channel, an irrigation channel in Azerbaijan
- Samur-Yalama National Park, a national park of Azerbaijan

== Other ==
- Samur languages
- FNSS Samur, Turkish amphibious armoured vehicle-launched bridge
- SAMUR, an emergency medical service in Spain
