= Müşfiq =

- Location within Azerbaijan
- Coordinates: 41°30′22″N 48°47′12″E
- Country: Azerbaijan
- Rayon: Khachmaz
- Time zone: UTC+4 (AZT)
  - Summer (DST): UTC+5 (AZT)

Müşfiq (known as Zaliyevka until 1999) is a village in the municipality of Müşkür in the Khachmaz Rayon of Azerbaijan.
