= Untsukul =

Rural locality in Dagestan, Russia

Coordinates: 42°42′44″N 46°47′31″E

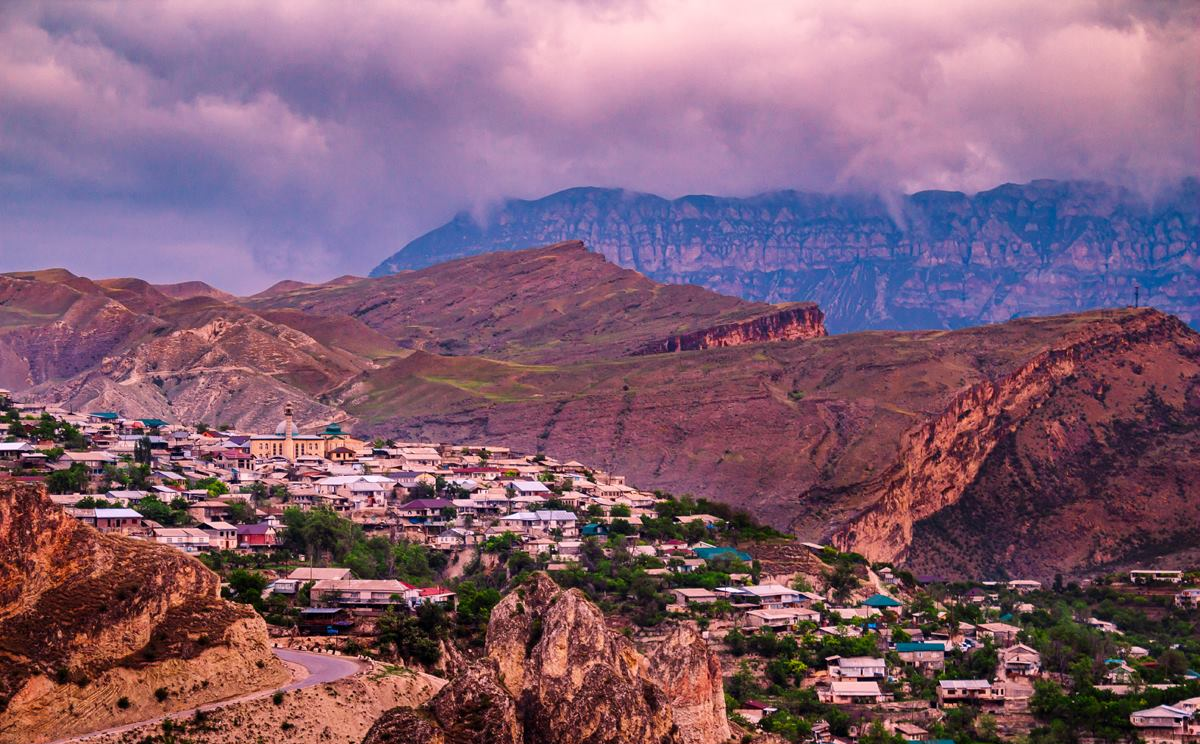
View of Untsukul

Untsukul (Russian: Унцукуль, Avar: Унсоколо) is a rural locality (a selo) and the administrative center of Untsukulsky District of the Republic of Dagestan, Russia. Population: 6,274 (2010 census); 5,523 (2002 census); 3,879 (1989 Soviet census).
