= Kiçik Baraxum =

- Location within Azerbaijan
- Coordinates: 41°36′N 48°49′E
- Country: Azerbaijan
- Rayon: Khachmaz
- Municipality: Dədəli
- Time zone: UTC+4 (AZT)
  - Summer (DST): UTC+5 (AZT)

Kiçik Baraxum (also, Kichik Barakhum) is a village in the Khachmaz Rayon of Azerbaijan. The village forms part of the municipality of Dədəli.
