= Müzəffəroba =

- Location within Azerbaijan
- Coordinates: 41°29′50″N 48°43′19″E
- Country: Azerbaijan
- Rayon: Khachmaz
- Municipality: Müşkür
- Time zone: UTC+4 (AZT)
  - Summer (DST): UTC+5 (AZT)

Müzəffəroba (or Müzəffər) is a village in the Khachmaz Rayon of Azerbaijan. The village forms part of the municipality of Müşkür.
