= Yuxarı Tahircal =

- Municipality
- Location within Azerbaijan
- Coordinates: 41°26′33″N 48°04′29″E
- Country: Azerbaijan
- Rayon: Qusar

Population
  - Total: 486
- Time zone: UTC+4 (AZT)
  - Summer (DST): UTC+5 (AZT)

Yuxarı Tahircal (also, Taardzhal, Tairdzhal, Tardzhal, and Yukhary-Tairdzhal) is a village and municipality in the Qusar Rayon of Azerbaijan. It has a population of 486.
