= Safi Khan Lezgi =

Safavid governor of Erivan from 1666 to 1674

Alqas Mirza, better known by his later name of Safi-(Qoli) Khan Lezgi, was a 17th-century official in Safavid Iran, who hailed from a Lezgian princely family. A native of Dagestan, he was the son of Aldas (Ildas) Mirza Shamkhal, also known as Ildirim Khan Shamkhal, and therefore a member of the family of the Shamkhal of Kumukh. He was sent to the Safavid court in Isfahan at a young age by his father during king Safi's reign (1629-1642), where he grew up and was renamed "Safi(-Qoli) Khan". He served as the governor (hakem) of the Erivan Province (also known as Chokhur-e Sa'd) from 1666 to 1674.

His son, Fath-Ali Khan Daghestani, rose to become one of the most powerful individuals in the Safavid state.

== Sources ==
- Bournoutian, George (2003). The Journal of Zak'aria of Agulis. Mazda Publishers. p. 75. ISBN 978-1568591070.
- Floor, Willem (2001). Safavid Government Institutions. Costa Mesa, California: Mazda Publishers. pp. 87–88. ISBN 978-1568591353.
- Floor, Willem M. (2008). Titles and Emoluments in Safavid Iran: A Third Manual of Safavid Administration, by Mirza Naqi Nasiri. Washington, DC: Mage Publishers. p. 172. ISBN 978-1933823232.
- Matthee, Rudi (2012). Persia in Crisis: Safavid Decline and the Fall of Isfahan. I.B.Tauris. pp. 146, 206. ISBN 978-1845117450.

Preceded by Abbasqoli Khan Qajar	Governor of Erivan Province (Chokhur-e Sa'd); 1666–1674	Succeeded by Saru Beg
