= Sumbatl =

Sumbatl Сумбатль Сумбатӏул
- Selo
- Location within Republic of Dagestan Location within Russia
- Coordinates: 42°02′N 47°13′E
- Country: Russia
- Region: Republic of Dagestan
- District: Kulinsky District
- Time zone: UTC+3:00

Sumbatl (Russian: Сумбатль; Lak: Сумбатӏул) is a rural locality (a selo) in Kulinsky District, Republic of Dagestan, Russia. The population was 264 as of 2010. There are 5 streets.

== Geography ==
Sumbatl is located 4 km south of Vachi (the district's administrative centre) by road. Vachi and Kaya are the nearest rural localities.

== Nationalities ==
Laks live there.
