= Starobelsky Uyezd =

Starobelsky Uyezd Старобельский уездъ
- Former subdivision of the Russian Empire
- 1797–1923
- Coat of arms

- Capital: Starobelsk
- Population
  - (1897): 359 285
- History
  - Established: 1797
  - Disestablished: 1923

Starobelsky Uyezd (Russian: Старобельский уезд; Ukrainian: Старобільський повіт, romanized: Starobilskyy povit) was an uyezd (district) in the Kharkov Governorate of the Russian Empire.

== History ==
This uyezd was created in May 1797. The administrative centre of uyezd was the town of Starobelsk.

The uyezd consisted of 42 volosts, two towns and 528 villages, slobodas and other small settlements. It was the biggest uyezd in Kharkov Governorate.

In January 1897, according to the Russian Empire Census, the population of the uyezd was 359,285.

By the Soviet administrative reform of 1923, the uyezd was transformed into Starobelsk okrug.

== Demographics ==
At the time of the Russian Empire Census of 1897, Starobelsky Uyezd had a population of 359,285. Of these, 83.4% spoke Ukrainian (Little Russian), 14.7% Russian (Great Russian), 1.5% Belarusian (White Russian) and 0.1% German as their native language.

== Sources ==
- "Старобельск" in Энциклопедический словарь Брокгауза и Ефрона : в 86 т. (82 т. и 4 доп.). — Т. 31. СПб., 1900. (in Russian)
