= Lezgian =

Lezgin, Lezgi, Lezgian, Lezghian or Lek can refer to:

- Lezgins, a people from southern Dagestan and northern Azerbaijan
- Lezgin language, the language spoken by Lezgins
