= Zizik, Quba =

Zizik
- Municipality
- Location within Azerbaijan
- Coordinates: 41°23′33″N 48°34′50″E
- Country: Azerbaijan
- Rayon: Quba

Population (2009)
  - Total: 1,588
- Time zone: UTC+4 (AZT)
  - Summer (DST): UTC+5 (AZT)

Zizik is a village and municipality in the Quba Rayon of Azerbaijan. It has a population of 1,588.
