= Lezgin Khanate =

Lezgin-led polity in Shirvan during the 18th century

Shirvan Khanate
- 1720–1728
- Flag of Lezgins, the people of this Khanate

- Map of the Lezgin Shirvan Khanate in 1721-1722, with authorities and vassals
- Status: Ottoman Vassal state from 1721 till 1725
- Capital: Shamakhi
- Official languages: Lezgian; Azerbaijani
- Religion: Sunni Islam
- Government: Khanate
  - Khan: Haji Davud
  - Vizier: Haji Gayb of Alpan
- History
  - Established: 1720
  - arrest of Haji Davud: 1728
Preceded by	Succeeded by
Safavid Shirvan	Gazikumukh Khanate
- Today part of: Azerbaijan Dagestan

The Lezgin Khanate historically known as the Shirvan Khanate or Haji Davud's Khanate was a short-lived 18th century political enitity in Shirvan and Kura established during the collapse of Safavid rule in the eastern Caucasus in 1720s. it emerged from a campaign and rebellion led by Haji Davud, a Lezgin ruler and spiritual leader from Mushkur, and his Sunni feudal allies in Dagestan and Shirvan.

The term "Lezgin Khanate" is typically not used in historical records or books but it will be used as the title of this article to avoid confusion with the Shirvan Khanate that was formed in 1748, and the Shirvanshahs a medieval period political entity.

== Early territories and authorities ==
Before the establishment of his rule in central Shirvan, Haji Davud had united the Lezgic Malikates and Bekdoms north and south of the Samur river and had managed to capture the cities of Khudat and Shabran. Haji Davud's rule in Quba region relied upon his authority with the local rulers, and principialites of southern Dagestan. Haji Davud's authority in this period was not equivalent to the later Ottoman-recognized Shirvan Khanate, but laid the base for his power in the region. Davud Beg relied upon alliances with rulers of neighbouring Dagestani polities, including Surkhay Khan of Gazikumukh Khanate and Ali Sultan of Elisu Sultanate, while local rulers retained varying degrees of autonomy.

== History ==
=== Expansion into Shirvan ===
Haji Davuds rule extended to central Shirvan during 1721. After defeating Safavid forces and taking Shamakhi in August 1721, he established the city as the capital of his growing state.

The capture of Shamakhi transformed Haji Davud's possessions from a primarily northern Shirvan and Quba-based territorial coalition into a state centered on the historic capital of Shirvan. In the same year Haji Davud later managed to capture the city of Barda for the territory of his Khanate.

=== Ottoman recognition ===
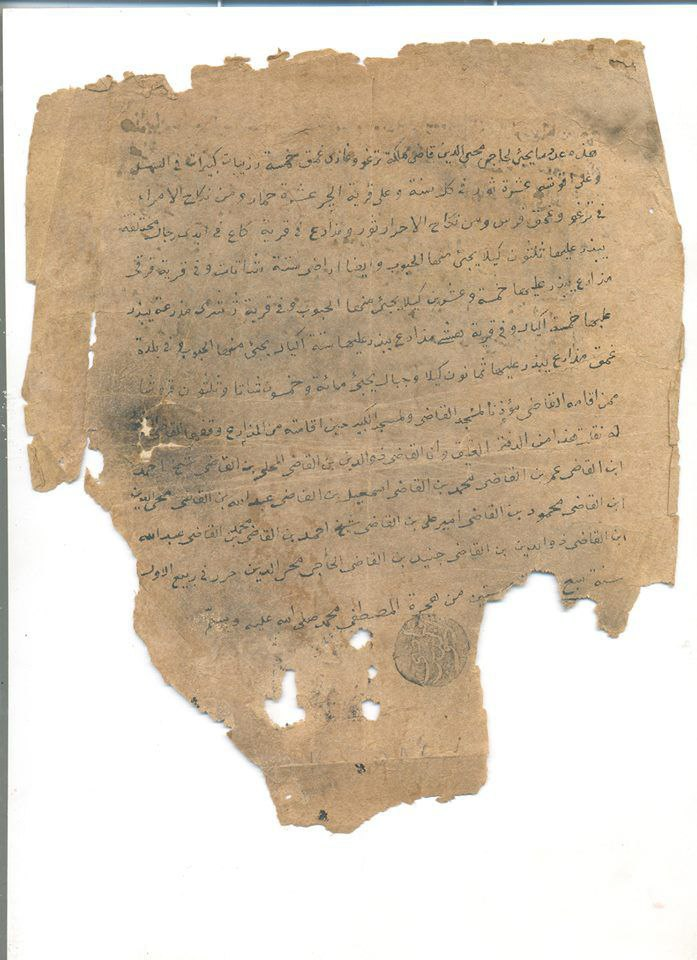
Fatwa of Haji Davud to Ahmed III

In late 1721, Haji Davud sought Ottoman protection as the number of Russian incursions in the Caspian region increased. The Ottoman Empire recognized his authority over Shirvan, proclaiming him as the rightful Khan in Shirvan.

=== Treaty of Constantinople ===
The position of the Khanate was altered by the expansion of the Russian Empire along the Caspian coast. Russian forces occupied Derbent in 1722 and Baku in 1723

The treaty of Constantinople divided the former Safavid territories between Russia and the Ottoman Empire. The Caspian provinces were placed under Russian sphere, while the rest of the Caucasus was placed under the Ottoman sphere, both empires recognized Haji Davud's Khanate in Shirvan.

=== Expansion into Mughan and Ardabil ===
In 1722, Haji Davud led his army into the Mugan region, expanding his rule beyond Shirvan. According to the Ottoman account by Bedreddin-zâde Mirliva Ali Bey, approximately 20,000–30,000 Turkmen households in Mughan submitted to Haji Davuds authority and swore allegiance to him. Haji Davud reportedly appointed a governor to rule the newly acquired territory.

The allied forces subsequently advanced towards Ardabil. The same account states that, after a campaign lasting seventeen days, they captured and sacked the city. Following its capture, Abd al-Razzaq Effendi was appointed mufti and qadi.

=== End of Haji Davuds rule ===
Relations between Haji Davud and the Ottoman government deteriorated in 1725 due to Haji Davud turning out to be an independent ruler. In 1728, the Ottoman authorities removed him from power and appointed Surkhay Khan as ruler of Shirvan. The change of ruler marked the end of the period of Haji Davud's Khanate.

== Territory ==
The territory controlled by Haji Davud changed considerably during the short existence of his state. In its early phase, his authority was centered on the Quba region and southern Dagestan. After the capture of Shamakhi in 1721, the political centre shifted south into central Shirvan, Shamakhi becoming the capital of Haji Davud's state. The Russian occupation of the Caspian coast and the Ottoman-Russian settlement of 1724 further changed the territory under Haji Davud's effective authority. Because control depended heavily on alliances with local rulers and military forces, the borders of the Khanate were not fixed in the manner of a modern territorial state.

== Political structure ==
The khanate was headed by Haji Davud, whose authority was supported by local elites and alliances with neighbouring Dagestani rulers.

The state incorporated territories with different political traditions. Local rulers and principalities retained varying degrees of autonomy, particularly in the mountainous regions north of Shirvan.

Following Ottoman recognition in 1723, the political status of Shirvan was formalized as a ''yurtluk ve ocaklık''. This provided Haji Davud with hereditary-style authority while placing the territory under Ottoman protection.
