= Alpan, Azerbaijan =

Alpan
- Municipality
- Location within Azerbaijan
- Coordinates: 41°23′17″N 48°25′49″E
- Country: Azerbaijan
- Rayon: Quba
- Elevation: 760 m (2,490 ft)

Population (2009)
  - Total: 3,837
- Time zone: UTC+4 (AZT)
  - Summer (DST): UTC+5 (AZT)

Alpan is a village and municipality in the Quba Rayon of Azerbaijan.
