= Dədəli, Khachmaz =

Dədəli
- Municipality
- Location within Azerbaijan
- Coordinates: 41°34′25″N 48°46′35″E
- Country: Azerbaijan
- Rayon: Khachmaz

Population
  - Total: 1,542
- Time zone: UTC+4 (AZT)
  - Summer (DST): UTC+5 (AZT)

Dədəli (also, Dedeli) is a village and municipality in the Khachmaz Rayon of Azerbaijan. It has a population of 1,542. The municipality consists of the villages of Dədəli, Kiçik Baraxum, and Nağıoba.

== Notable natives ==
- Lezgi Haji Davud - Shirvan Khan, during Ottoman rule.
