= Rudbar Mahal =

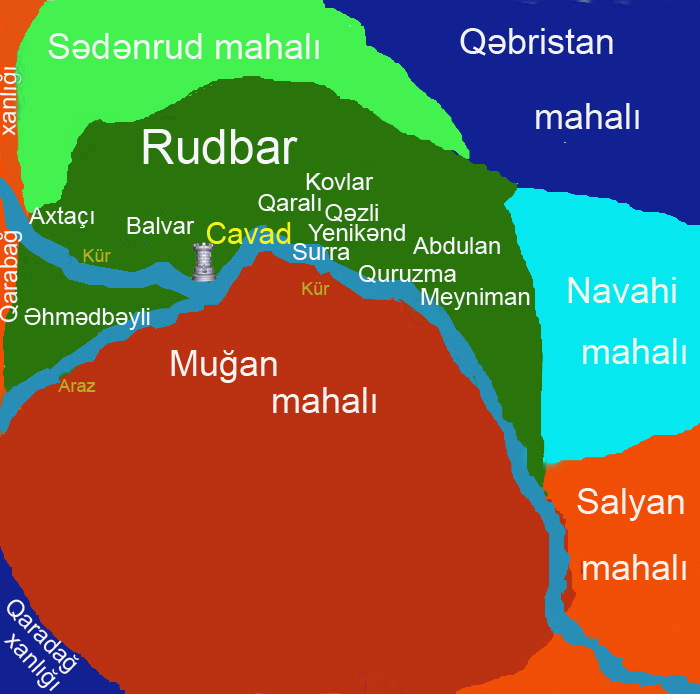
Rudbar Mahal in the 18th century.

Rudbar Mahal was one of seventeen districts in the Shirvan Khanate at the time it was annexed by Russia in 1820.

== History ==
The Rudbar Mahal was present in Sabirabad, Saatly, Neftchala and Hajigabul Districts.

The governor (naib) of mahal was Dargha Mammadkhan (the second half of the 18th century).

== Population ==
In 1821 there were eighteen settlements (Javad, Dabbaglar, Balvan, Qarali, Yenikend, Gazili, Ahmedbeyli, Guruzmanli, Abdulyan, Yenica, Mustafali, Ahtaci, Meyniman, Kovratlı, Surra Atamoghlan, Surra Aghabedal, Surra Mammad, Surra Abdulla bey, Alimadatli) where 422 families lived.

== Economy ==
Residents of the Rudbar district were engaged in agriculture and sericulture.

== See also ==
- Qalaqayın
- Mughan Mahal

== Source ==
- Description of the Shirvan province, compiled in 1820, by order of the governor of Georgia, A.P. Yermolov, Major-General Prince Madatov, and acting state adviser Mogilev (Report). Tiflis: Printing House of the Main Directorate of the Viceroy of the Caucasus. 1867.
