= Hasan-Ali Khan Daghestani =

Safavid official

Hasan-Ali Khan Daghestani (d. 1721) was a Safavid official of Lezgian origin, who served as the governor (beglarbeg) of Shirvan (1718) and of Shamakhi (hakem; March 1720–1721). He was a nephew of the Safavid grand vizier Fath-Ali Khan Daghestani (1716-1720).

During his tenure in Shirvan, the Lezgins of the Safavid domains in southern Dagestan and eastern Georgia (of the Qaniq valley) rose in revolt, ravaging Shirvan and completely defeating Hasan-Ali Khan's forces at Shaki. During his tenure in Shamakhi, he set out with a large Safavid force to defend against another Lezgin incursion, but the latter fell upon them at dawn; in the districts of Shaki, Hasan-Ali Khan Daghestani and a large number of his forces were killed.

== Sources ==
- Bournoutian, George A. (2009). A Brief History of the Aghuankʻ Region, by Esayi Hasan Jalaleantsʻ. Mazda Publishers. ISBN 978-1568591711.
- Floor, Willem M. (2008). Titles and Emoluments in Safavid Iran: A Third Manual of Safavid Administration, by Mirza Naqi Nasiri. Washington, DC: Mage Publishers. pp. 278–279, 287. ISBN 978-1933823232.
- Floor, Willem M.; Javadi, Hasan (2009). The heavenly rose-garden: a history of Shirvan & Daghestan, by Abbas Qoli Aqa Bakikhanov. Mage Publishers. ISBN 978-1933823270.
- Sicker, Martin (2001). The Islamic World in Decline: From the Treaty of Karlowitz to the Disintegration of the Ottoman Empire. Greenwood Publishing Group. ISBN 978-0275968915.

Preceded by Khosrow Khan	Governor of Shirvan; 1718	Succeeded by Hossein Beg
Preceded by Ismail Beg	Governor of Shamakhi; March 1720-1721	Succeeded by Lezgin-Ottoman takeover
