= Müşkür =

- Location within Azerbaijan
- Coordinates: 41°29′36″N 48°46′48″E
- Country: Azerbaijan
- Rayon: Khachmaz

Population
  - Total: 3,020
- Time zone: UTC+4 (AZT)
  - Summer (DST): UTC+5 (AZT)

Müşkür (known as Pavlovka until 1999) is a village and municipality in the Khachmaz Rayon of Azerbaijan. It has a population of 3,020. The municipality consists of the villages of Müşkür, Müzəffəroba, and Müşviq.

In 1999, the neighbouring villages of Qasabovka and Yekaterinovka were incorporated into Müşkür.
