= Khudat =

Town in Azerbaijan

Khudat Lezgian: Xtar
- Azerbaijani: Xudat
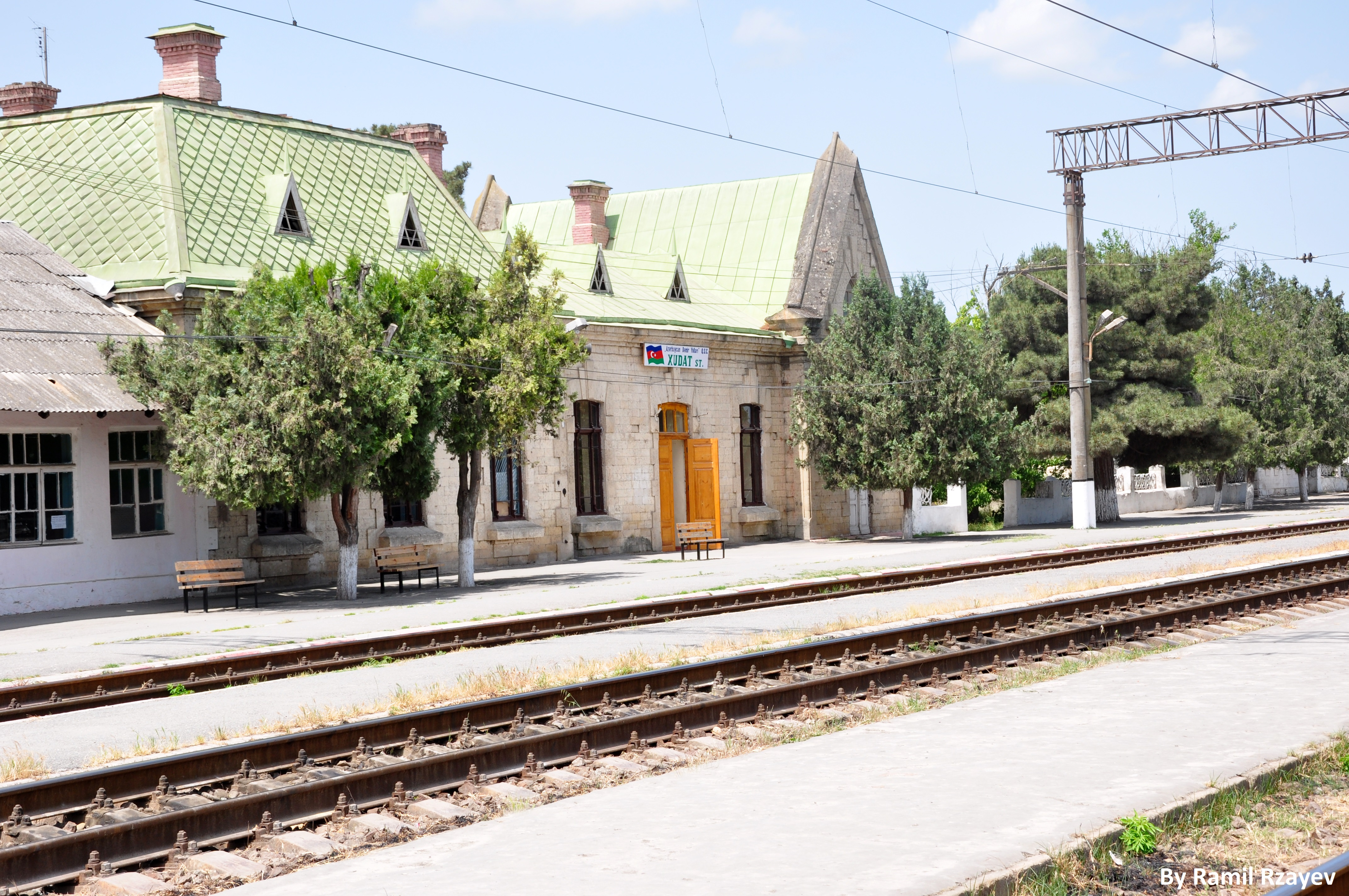

- Location within Azerbaijan
- Coordinates: 41°37′41″N 48°40′58″E
- Country: Azerbaijan
- District: Khachmaz

Population (2008)
  - Total: 14,442
- Time zone: UTC+4 (AZT)
  - Summer (DST): UTC+5 (AZT)

Khudat (also Xtar; Azerbaijani: Xudat Azerbaijani pronunciation: [xuˈdat], Lezgian: ХтIар Lezgian pronunciation: [ˈχtʼar]) is a town in the Caspian lowlands located in the northern section of Azerbaijan. It is a part of the Khachmaz District. It has a population of 14,442.

Khudat's time of historical significance took place in the 18th century, as the provincial capital of the Quba khanate under the rule of the Qajars. During this time, Hussein-khan, a native of the region, had spent time in Persia and adopted Shia Islam, creating favor in the eyes of the Shah, who granted him rule over both the Quba and Salyan khanates. Hussein-khan returned to the region and established his capital in Khudat. This period lasted until 1747, when Persian ruler Nader Shah was assassinated. Hussein-Ali, great-great-grandson of Hussein-khan, decided to try to turn the Quba khanate into an independent country and moved his capital to Quba due to the better natural defenses it offered to Khudat. The city subsequently fell out of importance in Azerbaijan and has become a location for launching excursions into the popular beaches and resorts of the Nabran area.

== Demographics ==
For 1970 y:

Ethnic group	Number	%
Azerbaijanis	3 970	45,1 %
Lezgins	2 734	31 %
Russians and Ukrainians	1 137	12,9 %
Kurds	588	6,7 %
Others	379	4,4 %
All	8 808	100,00 %
