= Shamilkala =

Shamilkala Шамилькала
- Urban-type settlement

Other transcription(s)
  - Avar: Шамилхъала
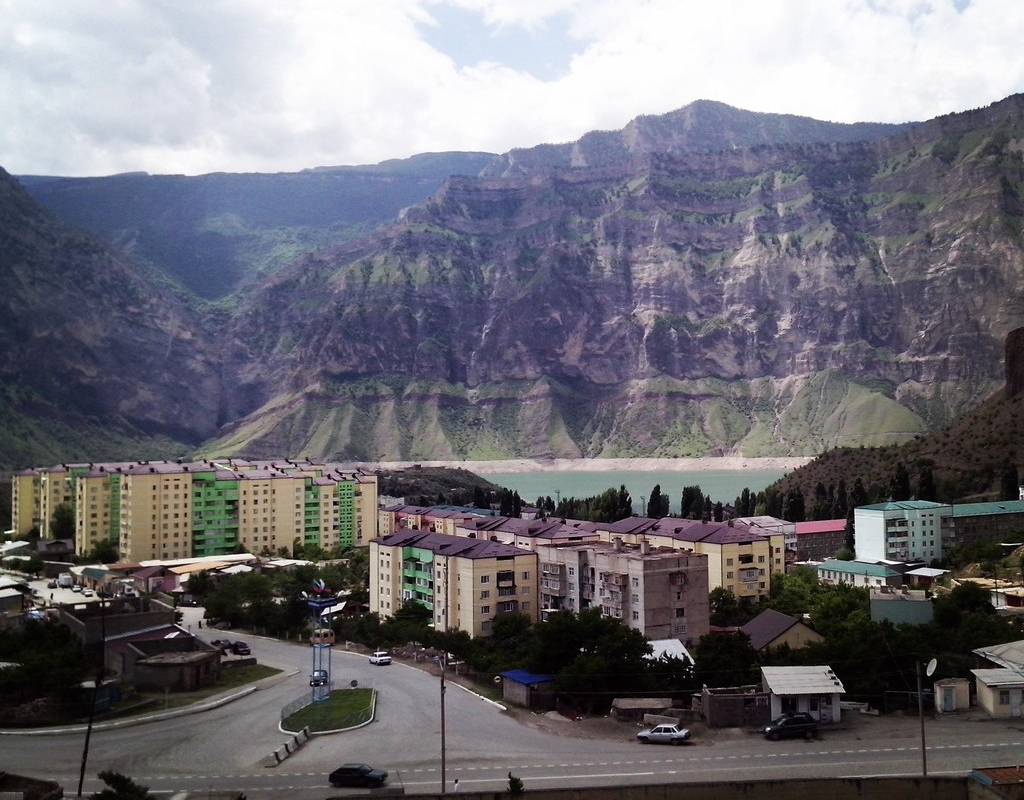
- View of Shamilkala

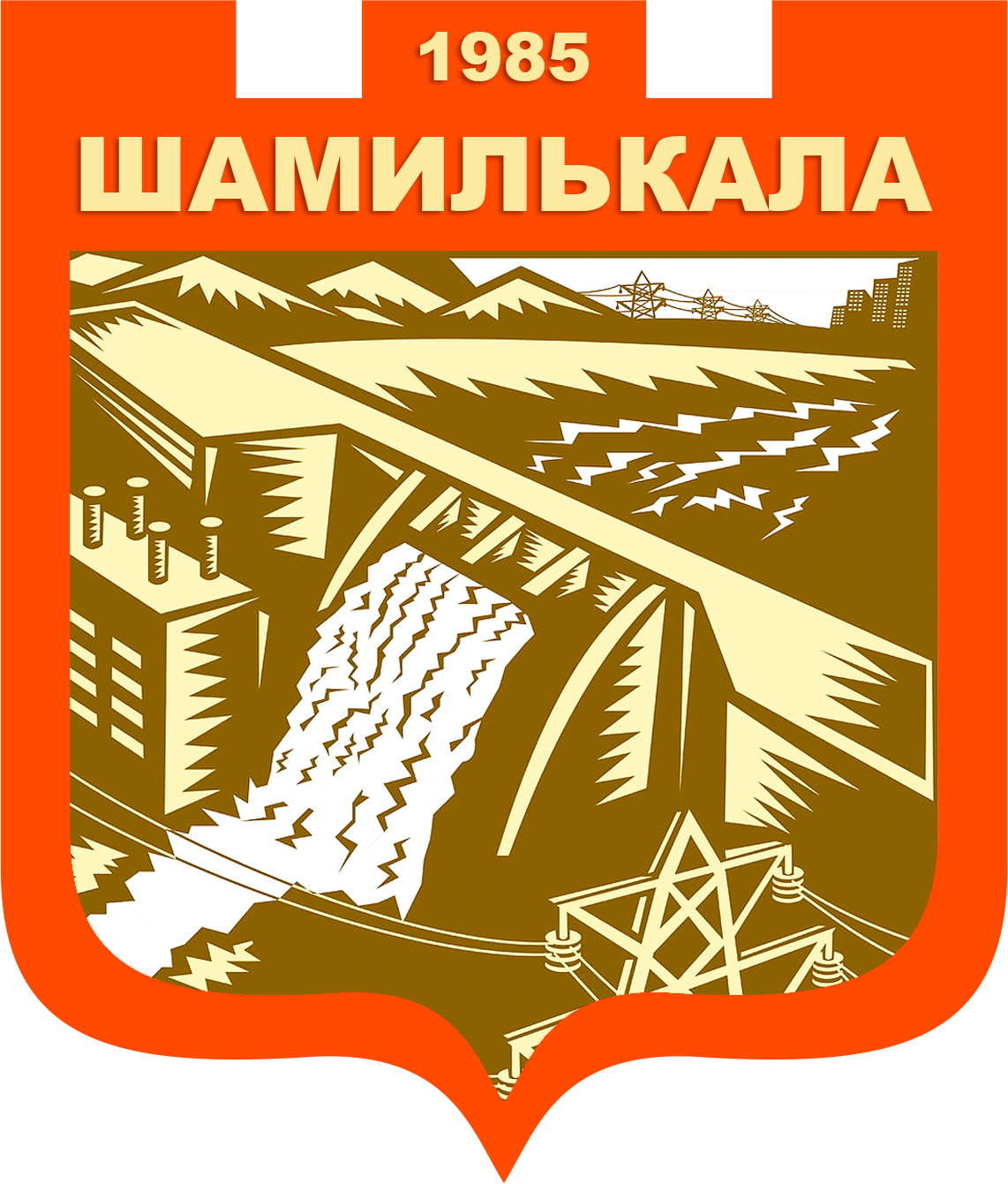
- Coat of arms
- Interactive map of Shamilkala
- Location of Shamilkala Shamilkala (Republic of Dagestan)
- Coordinates: 42°42′N 46°53′E
- Country: Russia
- Federal subject: Dagestan
- Administrative district: Untsukulsky District
- SettlementSelsoviet: Shamilkala Settlement

Population (2010 Census)
  - Total: 4,886
  - Estimate (2025): 5,264 (+7.7%)

Administrative status
  - Capital of: Shamilkala Settlement

Municipal status
  - Municipal district: Untsukulsky Municipal District
  - Urban settlement: Shamilkala Urban Settlement
  - Capital of: Shamilkala Urban Settlement
- Time zone: UTC+3 (MSK)
- Postal codes: 368903, 368948, 368950, 368959
- OKTMO ID: 82653155051

Shamilkala population
- 2010 Census: 4,886
- 2002 Census: 7,064

Shamilkala (Russian: Шамилькала; Avar: Шамилхъала) is an urban locality (an urban-type settlement) in Untsukulsky District of the Republic of Dagestan, Russia. The settlement is named after Imam Shamil. As of the 2010 Census, its population was 4,886.

== Administrative and municipal status ==
Within the framework of administrative divisions, the urban-type settlement of Shamilkala is incorporated within Untsukulsky District as Shamilkala Settlement (an administrative division of the district). As a municipal division, Shamilkala Settlement is incorporated within Untsukulsky Municipal District as Shamilkala Urban Settlement.
