= Untsukulsky District =

Untsukulsky District Унцукульский район (Russian)
- District

Other transcription(s)
  - Avar: Унсоколо мухъ
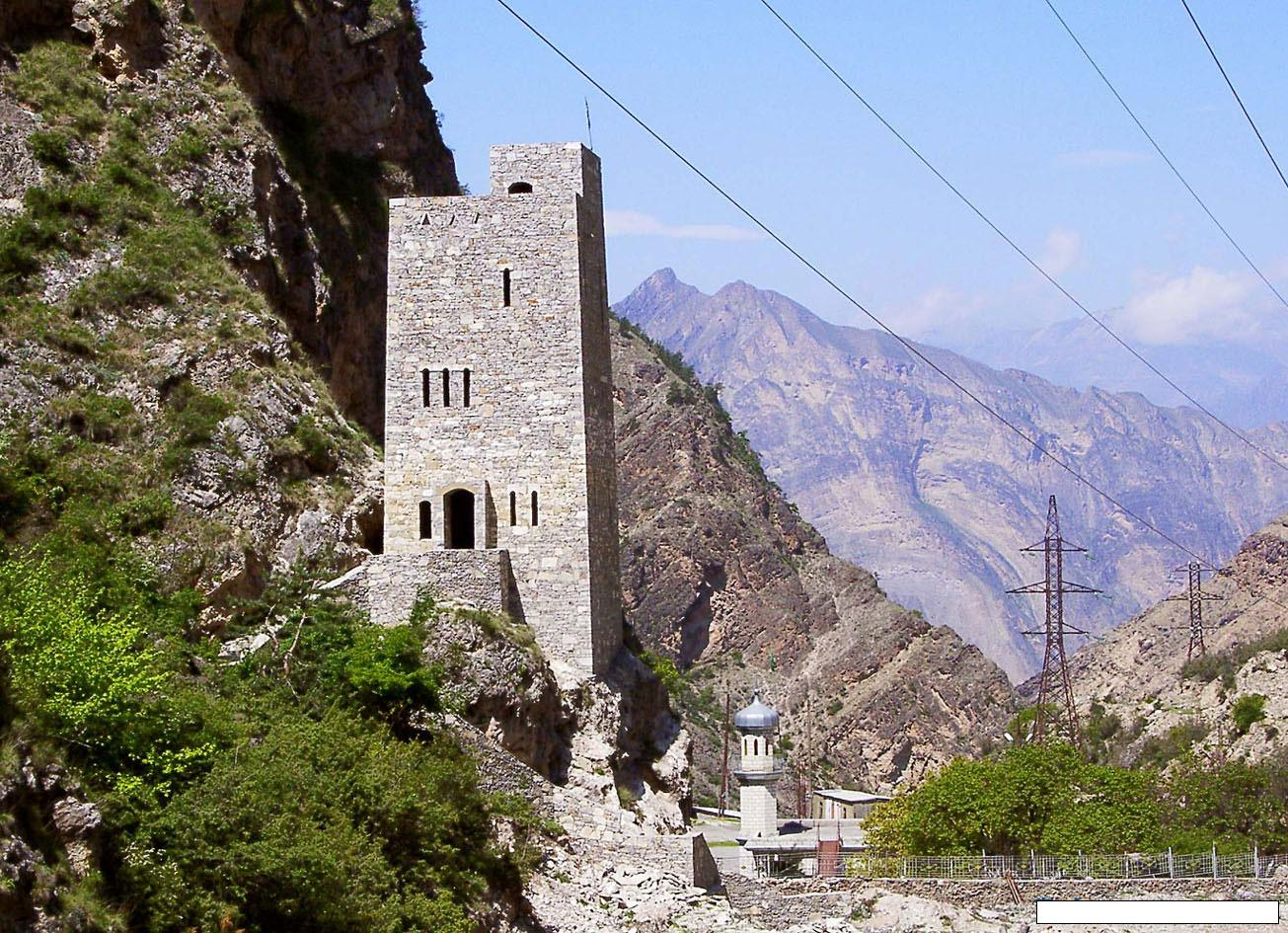
- Gimry Tower, a cultural heritage object in Untsukulsky District

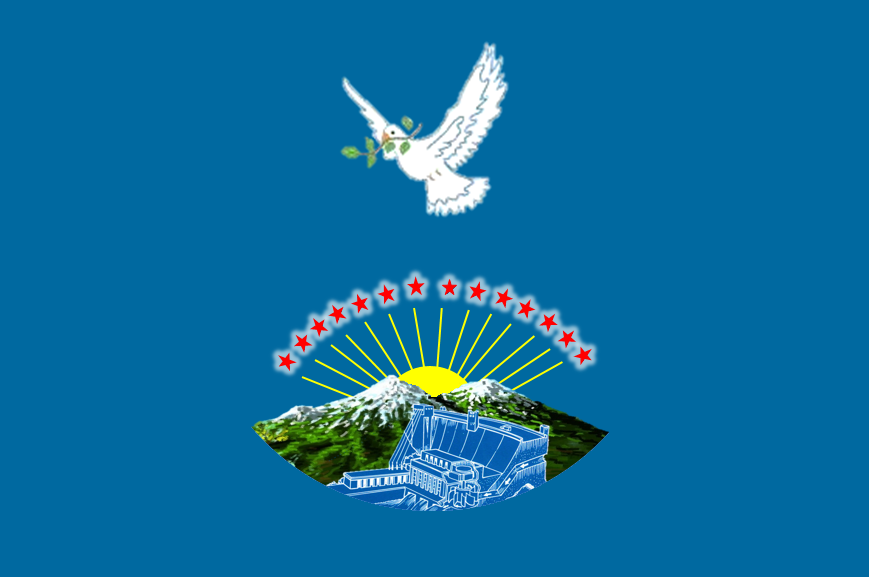
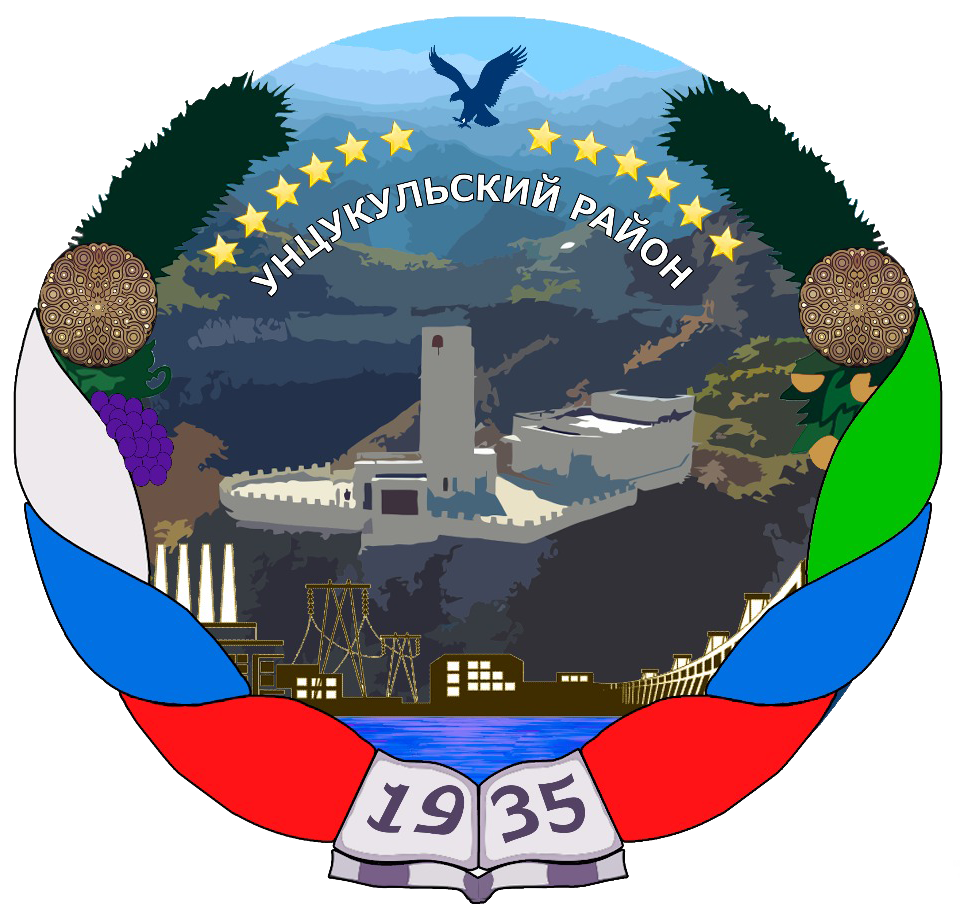
- Flag Coat of arms
- Location of Untsukulsky District in the Republic of Dagestan
- Coordinates: 42°53′N 47°12′E
- Country: Russia
- Federal subject: Republic of Dagestan
- Established: 1935
- Administrative center: Untsukul

Area
  - Total: 560 km^{2} (220 sq mi)

Population (2010 Census)
  - Total: 29,547
  - Density: 53/km^{2} (140/sq mi)
  - Urban: 16.5%
  - Rural: 83.5%

Administrative structure
  - Administrative divisions: 1 Settlements, 6 Selsoviets
  - Inhabited localities: 1 urban-type settlements, 20 rural localities

Municipal structure
  - Municipally incorporated as: Untsukulsky Municipal District
  - Municipal divisions: 1 urban settlements, 11 rural settlements
- Time zone: UTC+3 (MSK)
- OKTMO ID: 82653000
- Website: http://uncukul.ru

Population of Untsukulsky District
- 2010 Census: 29,547
- 2002 Census: 27,460
- 1989 Census: 16,105
- 1979 Census: 11,786

Untsukulsky District (Russian: Унцукульский райо́н; Avar: Унсоколо мухъ) is an administrative and municipal district (raion), one of the forty-one in the Republic of Dagestan, Russia. It is located in the center of the republic. The area of the district is 560 square kilometers (220 sq mi). Its administrative center is the rural locality (a selo) of Untsukul. As of the 2010 Census, the total population of the district was 29,547, with the population of Untsukul accounting for 21.2% of that number.

== Administrative and municipal status ==
Within the framework of administrative divisions, Untsukulsky District is one of the forty-one in the Republic of Dagestan. It is divided into one settlement (an administrative division with the administrative center in the urban-type settlement (an inhabited locality) of Shamilkala) and six selsoviets, which comprise twenty rural localities. As a municipal division, the district is incorporated as Untsukulsky Municipal District. The settlement is incorporated as an urban settlement, and the six selsoviets are incorporated as eleven rural settlements within the municipal district. The selo of Untsukul serves as the administrative center of both the administrative and municipal district.
