= Sovetskoye, Magaramkentsky District, Republic of Dagestan =

Sovetskoye Советское Мемреч
- Village
- Location within Republic of Dagestan Location within Russia
- Coordinates: 41°43′N 48°19′E
- Country: Russia
- Region: Republic of Dagestan
- District: Magaramkentsky District
- Time zone: UTC+3:00

Sovetskoye (Russian: Советское, Judeo-Tat: Мемреч) is a rural locality (a selo) in Magaramkentsky District, Republic of Dagestan, Russia. The population was 4,217 as of 2010. There are 37 streets.

== Geography ==
The village is located on the federal Caucasus highway at the point where it crosses the Gyulgerichay River, on its left bank, 12 km north of the district center, the village of Magaramkent. Near the village there is a road junction leading to the villages of Magaramkent and Kasumkent.

== History ==
The village was formed by settlers on the site of the ancient Mountain Jewish village of Mamrash (Mamrach).

Mamrash (the old name of the village "Kevadzhik", also known as "Kuvadzhuk") was founded in 1810 by Mountain Jewish settlers from the mountain village of Karchag. In 1886, 668 Jews lived in the village, there was a synagogue and a cheder.

In 1895, there were 114 farms in the village, including 84 farms of Mountain Jews.

In the early 1900s, the village was divided into two rural communities - Mountain Jewish and Lezgins. Due to frequent attacks and harassment from neighboring nations, the Jewish population is gradually starting to leave the village. Mamrash was especially hard hit during the Russian Civil War, when several dozen people were killed, and some houses were burned as a result of the attack.

According to the data for 1929, there were 32 households in the village of Mamrash, administratively it was part of the Khanzhalkala village council of the Suleyman-Stalsky District.

By the beginning of the 1960s, Mountain Jews completely left the village. Since 1953, the resettlement of residents of remote villages of high-mountain regions – Yaldzhukh, Filidzakh, Filif-Gyune of the Akhtynsky District, Burshi-Maka of the Kurakhsky District, Gezerkent, Makhmudkent, Tselyagyun of the Magaramkentsky District, Kartas-Kazmalyar of the Suleyman-Stalsky District, as well as individual farms of the Rutulsky District, began to move to the village.

== Nationalities ==
Lezgins live there.
