= Karchag =

Karchag Карчаг КIварчагъ Гъэрчогъ
- Village
- Location within Republic of Dagestan Location within Russia
- Coordinates: 41°46′N 48°09′E
- Country: Russia
- Region: Republic of Dagestan
- District: Suleyman-Stalsky District

Population (2021)
  - Total: 1,850 people
- Time zone: UTC+3:00
- Postal code: 368773

Karchag (Russian: Карчаг; Lezgian: КIварчагъ; Judeo-Tat: Гъэрчогъ) is a rural locality (a selo) and the administrative centre of Karchagsky Selsoviet, Suleyman-Stalsky District, Republic of Dagestan, Russia.

== Geography ==
Karchag is located on the Karchagsu River, 173 km (107 mi) southeast of Makhachkala and 16 km (9.9 mi) north of Kasumkent (the district's administrative centre) by road. Ekendil is the nearest rural locality.

== History ==
At 2 km south of Karchag, in the town of Leger, stone tombs were discovered. A bronze dagger with an openwork handle from the 12th-11th centuries BC was found in the opened graves.

The early explorer of the Caucasus S. M. Bronevsky (1763-1830), describing the population and military strength of the Tabasaran region, mentioned Karchag (Bronevsky wrote it down as “Kerchakh”) among the 8 main Tabasaran’s villages. In the book “Review of Russian Possessions beyond the Caucasus,” published in 1836, Karchag is mentioned among the villages of the Dere and Kam mahallas of Lower Tabasaran.

Karchag belonged to the Derlin mahallas of the Derbent province. At the end of the 19th century, it belonged to the South Tabasaran naib. After the formation of the Dagestan Autonomous Soviet Socialist Republic, Karchag and 3 other villages (Zizik, İmamqulukənd, Ekendil) administratively became part of the Zizik village council of the Kyurinsky district.

== Population and language ==
In the past, Karchag was a Lezgins - Mountain Jews settlement. A.K. Alikberov writes that: “its Iranian-speaking population, who professed Judaism, had long been assimilated by the predominant Lezgins population.”

According to the “Caucasian Calendar” for 1857, Sunni Lezgins and Mountain Jews lived here, and the local languages were “Kyurinsky” (Lezgin) and Judeo-Tat.

The Mountain Jews of the Kyurinsky Khanate came from Karchag. Thus, the district physician of the Kyurinsky district, Alexei Tsvetkov, who studied the tukkhum of this district in the 1860s, wrote: “Kyurinsky’s Jews are settlers from Lezgins villages Karchag."

Based on a list of populated places in the Dagestan region compiled in 1888, the population of Karchag consisted of Muslims and Mountain Jews. The number of the first was 508 people (261 male and 247 women; 79 houses) and they were Sunni Lezgins. The Mountain Jews were 255 people (130 male and 125 women; 47 houses).

The “Caucasian Calendar” of 1910 says that in 1908, 868 people lived in the village, of whom there were mainly Lezgins. Another “Caucasian calendar” of 1912 records that 901 inhabitants lived in the village, also mostly were Lezgins. At that time, Karchag was part of the Kyurinsky district of the Dagestan region.

According to the results of the 1926 census, 724 people lived in Karchag (356 men and 368 women) and all were Lezgins.

Year	1895	1926	1939	1970	1989	2002	2010	2021
Population	761	724	683	1052	1028	1593	1739	1850
