= Zukhrabkent =

Zukhrabkent Зухрабкент Зугьрабхуьр
- Selo
- Location within Republic of Dagestan Location within Russia
- Coordinates: 41°34′N 48°09′E
- Country: Russia
- Region: Republic of Dagestan
- District: Suleyman-Stalsky District
- Time zone: UTC+3:00

Zukhrabkent (Russian: Зухрабкент; Lezgian: Зугьрабхуьр) is a rural locality (a selo) in Shikhikentsky Selsoviet, Suleyman-Stalsky District, Republic of Dagestan, Russia. Population: 245 (2010 census); 358 (2002 census); 205 (1989 Soviet census). There are 2 streets.

== Geography ==
It is located 17 km south of Kasumkent. Khtun is the nearest rural locality.
