= Salyan, Republic of Dagestan =

Salyan Сальян Салиян
- Selo
- Location within Republic of Dagestan Location within Russia
- Coordinates: 41°37′N 48°11′E
- Country: Russia
- Region: Republic of Dagestan
- District: Suleyman-Stalsky District
- Time zone: UTC+3:00

Salyan (Russian: Сальян; Lezgian: Салиян) is a rural locality (a selo) and the administrative centre of Ispiksky Selsoviet, Suleyman-Stalsky District, Republic of Dagestan, Russia. Population: 95 (2010 census); 101 (2002 census); 53 (1989 Soviet census). There are 2 streets.

== Geography ==
Salyan is located 195 km (121 mi) southeast of Makhachkala and 9 km (5.6 mi) southeast of Kasumkent (the district's administrative centre) by road. Ispik is the nearest rural locality.
