= Alkadar =

Alkadar Алкадар Алкьвадар
- Selo
- Location within Republic of Dagestan Location within Russia
- Coordinates: 41°42′N 48°05′E
- Country: Russia
- Region: Republic of Dagestan
- District: Suleyman-Stalsky District
- Time zone: UTC+3:00

Alkadar (Russian: Алкадар; Lezgian: Алкьвадар) is a rural locality (a selo) and the administrative centre of Alkadarsky Selsoviet, Suleyman-Stalsky District, Republic of Dagestan, Russia. Population: 970 (2010 census); 971 (2002 census); 546 (1989 Soviet census). There are 36 streets.

== Geography ==
Alkadar is located on the left bank of the Chiragchay River, 6 km northwest of Kasumkent (the district's administrative centre) by road. Kurkent and Sardarkent are the nearest rural localities.

== Population ==
The village is composed of ethnic Lezgins. There is a house-museum of Mirza Hasan Alkadari, Islamic scholar and historian.
