= Shikhikent =

Shikhikent Шихикент Шихидхуьр
- Selo
- Location within Republic of Dagestan Location within Russia
- Coordinates: 41°36′N 48°09′E
- Country: Russia
- Region: Republic of Dagestan
- District: Suleyman-Stalsky District
- Time zone: UTC+3:00

Shikhikent (Russian: Шихикент; Lezgian: Шихидхуьр) is a rural locality (a selo) and the administrative centre of Shikhikentsky Selsoviet, Suleyman-Stalsky District, Republic of Dagestan, Russia. Population: 964 (2010 census); 669 (2002 census); 331 (1989 Soviet census). There are 3 streets.

== Geography ==
Shikhikent is located 11 km south of Kasumkent (the district's administrative centre) by road. Butkent is the nearest rural locality.
