= Chukhverkent =

Chukhverkent Чухверкент ЦIийи Чуьхверхуьр
- Selo
- Location within Republic of Dagestan Location within Russia
- Coordinates: 41°46′N 48°22′E
- Country: Russia
- Region: Republic of Dagestan
- District: Suleyman-Stalsky District
- Time zone: UTC+3:00

Chukhverkent (Russian: Чухверкент; Lezgian: ЦIийи Чуьхверхуьр) is a rural locality (a selo) in Novomakinsky Selsoviet, Suleyman-Stalsky District, Republic of Dagestan, Russia. Population: 928 (2021 census); 894 (2002 census); 465 (1989 Soviet census). There are 9 streets.

== Geography ==
Chukhverkent is located on the left bank of the Gyulgerychay River, 165 km (103 mi) southeast of Makhachkala and 24 km (15 mi) northeast of Kasumkent (the district's administrative centre) by road. Novaya Maka is the nearest rural locality.
