= Dzhepel =

Dzhepel Джепель ЧIепел
- Selo
- Location within Republic of Dagestan Location within Russia
- Coordinates: 41°33′N 48°13′E
- Country: Russia
- Region: Republic of Dagestan
- District: Magaramkentsky District
- Time zone: UTC+3:00

Dzhepel (Russian: Джепель; Lezgian: ЧIепел) is a rural locality (a selo) in Kirkinsky Selsoviet, Magaramkentsky District, Republic of Dagestan, Russia. The population was 1,013 as of 2010. There are 14 streets.

== Geography ==
Dzhepel is located on the left bank of the Samur River, 15 km southwest of Magaramkent (the district's administrative centre) by road. Khorel and Gilyar are the nearest rural localities.

== Nationalities ==
Lezgins live there.
