= Novy Aul =

Novy Aul Новый Аул ЦIийхуьр Ени Аул
- Selo
- Location within Republic of Dagestan Location within Russia
- Coordinates: 41°43′N 48°23′E
- Country: Russia
- Region: Republic of Dagestan
- District: Magaramkentsky District
- Time zone: UTC+3:00

Novy Aul (Russian: Новый Аул; Lezgian: ЦIийхуьр; Azerbaijani: Ени Аул, Yeni Aul) is a rural locality (a selo) and the administrative centre of Novoaulsky Selsoviet, Magaramkentsky District, Republic of Dagestan, Russia. The population was 2,760 as of 2010. There are 28 streets.

== Geography ==
Novy Aul is located 14 km northeast of Magaramkent (the district's administrative centre) by road. Zakhit and But-Kazmalyar are the nearest rural localities.

== Nationalities ==
Lezgins, Azerbaijanis and Rutuls live there.
