= Ptikent =

Ptikent Птикент Птидхуьр
- Selo
- Location within Republic of Dagestan Location within Russia
- Coordinates: 41°35′N 48°06′E
- Country: Russia
- Region: Republic of Dagestan
- District: Suleyman-Stalsky District
- Time zone: UTC+3:00

Ptikent (Russian: Птикент; Lezgian: Птидхуьр) is a rural locality (a selo) in Ullugatagsky Selsoviet, Suleyman-Stalsky District, Republic of Dagestan, Russia. Population: 262 (2010 census); 258 (2002 census); 136 (1989 Soviet census).

== Geography ==
Ptikent is located 14 km south of Kasumkent (the district's administrative centre) by road. Tatarkhankent is the nearest rural locality.
