= Oruzhba =

Oruzhba Оружба Уружба
- Selo
- Location within Republic of Dagestan Location within Russia
- Coordinates: 41°46′N 48°26′E
- Country: Russia
- Region: Republic of Dagestan
- District: Magaramkentsky District
- Time zone: UTC+3:00

Oruzhba (Russian: Оружба; Lezgian: Уружба) is a rural locality (a selo) and the administrative centre of Oruzhbinsky Selsoviet, Magaramkentsky District, Republic of Dagestan, Russia. The population was 1,839 as of 2010. There are 41 streets.

== Geography ==
Oruzhba is located 23 km northeast of Magaramkent (the district's administrative centre) by road. Klichkhan and Bugdatepe are the nearest rural localities.

== Nationalities ==
Lezgins live there.
