= Piperkent =

Piperkent Пиперкент Пиперхуьр
- Selo
- Location within Republic of Dagestan Location within Russia
- Coordinates: 41°35′N 48°08′E
- Country: Russia
- Region: Republic of Dagestan
- District: Suleyman-Stalsky District
- Time zone: UTC+3:00

Piperkent (Russian: Пиперкент; Lezgian: Пиперхуьр) is a rural locality (a selo) in Shikhikentsky Selsoviet, Suleyman-Stalsky District, Republic of Dagestan, Russia. Population: 225 (2010 census); 184 (2002 census); 64 (1989 Soviet census).

== Geography ==
Piperkent is located 13 km south of Kasumkent (the district's administrative centre) by road. Saytarkent is the nearest rural locality.
