= Ashagakartas =

Ashagakartas Ашагакартас Агъа Картас
- Selo
- Location within Republic of Dagestan Location within Russia
- Coordinates: 41°37′N 48°07′E
- Country: Russia
- Region: Republic of Dagestan
- District: Suleyman-Stalsky District
- Time zone: UTC+3:00

Ashagakartas (Russian: Ашагакартас; Lezgian: Агъа Картас) is a rural locality (a selo) in Ullugatagsky Selsoviet, Suleyman-Stalsky District, Republic of Dagestan, Russia. Population: 190 (2010 census); 222 (2002 census); 114 (1989 Soviet census).

== Geography ==
Ashagakartas is located 8 km south of Kasumkent (the district's administrative centre) by road. Yukharikartas is the nearest rural locality.
