= Ashaga-Stal =

Ashaga-Stal Ашага-Стал Агъа СтIал
- Selo
- Location within Republic of Dagestan Location within Russia
- Coordinates: 41°41′N 48°11′E
- Country: Russia
- Region: Republic of Dagestan
- District: Suleyman-Stalsky District
- Time zone: UTC+3:00

Ashaga-Stal (Russian: Ашага-Стал; Lezgian: Агъа СтIал) is a rural locality (a selo) and the administrative centre of Ashaga-Stalsky Selsoviet, Suleyman-Stalsky District, Republic of Dagestan, Russia. Population: 2,764 (2021 census); 2,628 (2002 census); 1,869 (1989 Soviet census). There are 72 streets.

== Geography ==
Ashaga-Stal is located 185 km (115 mi) southeast of Makhachkala and 5 km (3.1 mi) northeast of Kasumkent (the district's administrative centre) by road. Orta-Stal is the nearest rural locality.

== Famous residents ==
- Suleyman Stalsky (poet)
- Sayad Stalskaya (poet)
