= Saidkent =

Saidkent Саидкент Сийидхуьр
- Selo
- Location within Republic of Dagestan Location within Russia
- Coordinates: 41°42′N 48°07′E
- Country: Russia
- Region: Republic of Dagestan
- District: Suleyman-Stalsky District
- Time zone: UTC+3:00

Saidkent (Russian: Саидкент; Lezgian: Сийидхуьр) is a rural locality (Selo) in Kasumkentsky Selsoviet, Suleyman-Stalsky District, Republic of Dagestan, Russia. Population: 1,007 (2010 census); 1,054 (2002 census); 570 (1989 Soviet census). There are 24 streets.

== Geography ==
Saidkent is located on the right bank of the Chiragchay River, 190 kilometers southeast of Makhachkala and 3 kilometers northwest of Kasumkent (the district's administrative centre) by road. Kasumkent is the nearest rural locality.
