= Bilbil-Kazmalyar =

Bilbil-Kazmalyar Бильбиль-Казмаляр Билбил-Къазма
- Selo
- Location within Republic of Dagestan Location within Russia
- Coordinates: 41°49′N 48°32′E
- Country: Russia
- Region: Republic of Dagestan
- District: Magaramkentsky District
- Time zone: UTC+3:00

Bilbil-Kazmalyar (Russian: Бильбиль-Казмаляр; Lezgian: Билбил-Къазма) is a rural locality (a selo) and the administrative centre of Bilbilsky Selsoviet, Magaramkentsky District, Republic of Dagestan, Russia. The population was 2,042 as of 2010. There are 28 streets.

== Geography ==
Bilbil-Kazmalyar is located 37 km northeast of Magaramkent (the district's administrative centre) by road, on the left bank of the Yalama River. Khtun-Kazmalyar and Tagirkent-Kazmalyar are the nearest rural localities.

== Nationalities ==
Lezgins and Rutuls live in the locality.
