= Kurkent =

Kurkent Куркент Курхуьр
- Selo
- Location within Republic of Dagestan Location within Russia
- Coordinates: 41°42′N 48°06′E
- Country: Russia
- Region: Republic of Dagestan
- District: Suleyman-Stalsky District
- Time zone: UTC+3:00

Kurkent (Russian: Куркент; Lezgian: Курхуьр) is a rural locality (a selo) in Suleyman-Stalsky District, Republic of Dagestan, Russia. Population: 3,960 (2021 census); 3,011 (2002 census); 1,905 (1989 Soviet census). There are 30 streets.

== Geography ==
Kurkent is located on the left bank of the Chiragchay River, 194 km (121 mi) southeast of Makhachkala and 6 km (3.7 mi) northwest of Kasumkent (the district's administrative centre) by road. Saidkent is the nearest rural locality.
