= Khpyuk, Suleyman-Stalsky District, Republic of Dagestan =

Khpyuk Хпюк Хъпуьхъ
- Selo
- Location within Republic of Dagestan Location within Russia
- Coordinates: 41°39′N 47°57′E
- Country: Russia
- Region: Republic of Dagestan
- District: Suleyman-Stalsky District
- Time zone: UTC+3:00

Khpyuk (Russian: Хпюк; Lezgian: Хъпуьхъ) is a rural locality (a selo) in Suleyman-Stalsky District, Republic of Dagestan, Russia. Population: 124 (2021 census); 253 (2002 census); 97 (1989 Soviet census). There are 3 streets.

== Geography ==
Khpyuk is located 21 km west of Kasumkent (the district's administrative centre) by road. Kachalkent is the nearest rural locality.
