= Kakhtsug =

Kakhtsug Кахцуг КахцIугъ
- Selo
- Location within Republic of Dagestan Location within Russia
- Coordinates: 41°36′N 48°03′E
- Country: Russia
- Region: Republic of Dagestan
- District: Suleyman-Stalsky District
- Time zone: UTC+3:00

Kakhtsug (Russian: Кахцуг; Lezgian: КахцIугъ) is a rural locality (a selo) in Kasumkentsky Selsoviet, Suleyman-Stalsky District, Republic of Dagestan, Russia. Population: 645 (2010 census); 611 (2002 census); 276 (1989 Soviet census). There are 13 streets.

== Geography ==
Kakhtsug is located on the Kurakh River, 201 km (125 mi) southeast of Makhachkala and 14 km (8.7 mi) southwest of Kasumkent (the district's administrative centre) by road. is the nearest rural locality. Tatarkhankent is the nearest rural locality.
