= But-Kazmalyar =

But-Kazmalyar Бут-Казмаляр Бутан Къазма
- Selo
- Location within Republic of Dagestan Location within Russia
- Coordinates: 41°42′N 48°23′E
- Country: Russia
- Region: Republic of Dagestan
- District: Magaramkentsky District
- Time zone: UTC+3:00

But-Kazmalyar (Russian: Бут-Казмаляр; Lezgian: Бутан Къазма) is a rural locality (a selo) in Magaramkentsky District, Republic of Dagestan, Russia. The population was 3,127 as of 2010. There are 33 streets.

== Geography ==
But-Kazmalyar is located 2 km east from Samur, 11 km northeast of Magaramkent (the district's administrative centre) by road. Novy Usur and Novy Aul are the nearest rural localities.

== Nationalities ==
Lezgins live there.
