= Ullugatag =

Ullugatag Уллугатаг Уллугъетягъ
- Selo
- Location within Republic of Dagestan Location within Russia
- Coordinates: 41°36′N 48°07′E
- Country: Russia
- Region: Republic of Dagestan
- District: Suleyman-Stalsky District
- Time zone: UTC+3:00

Ullugatag (Russian: Уллугатаг; Lezgian: Уллугъетягъ) is a rural locality (a selo) and the administrative centre of Ullugatagsky Selsoviet, Suleyman-Stalsky District, Republic of Dagestan, Russia. Population: 636 (2010 census); 586 (2002 census); 368 (1989 Soviet census). There are 4 streets.

== Geography ==
Ullugatag is located 11 km south of Kasumkent (the district's administrative centre) by road. Saytarkent is the nearest rural locality.
