= Khorel =

Khorel Хорель Хуьрел
- Selo
- Location within Republic of Dagestan Location within Russia
- Coordinates: 41°32′N 48°11′E
- Country: Russia
- Region: Republic of Dagestan
- District: Magaramkentsky District
- Time zone: UTC+3:00

Khorel (Russian: Хорель; Lezgian: Хуьрел) is a rural locality (a selo) in Kirkinsky Selsoviet, Magaramkentsky District, Republic of Dagestan, Russia. The population was 634 as of 2010. There are 21 streets.

== Geography ==
Khorel is located 17 km southwest of Magaramkent (the district's administrative centre) by road. Kirka and Dzhepel are the nearest rural localities.

== Nationalities ==
Lezgins live there.
