= Novaya Maka =

Novaya Maka Новая Мака Цlийи Макьар
- Selo
- Location within Republic of Dagestan Location within Russia
- Coordinates: 41°46′N 48°21′E
- Country: Russia
- Region: Republic of Dagestan
- District: Suleyman-Stalsky District
- Time zone: UTC+3:00

Novaya Maka (Russian: Новая Мака; Lezgian: Цlийи Макьар) is a rural locality (a selo) and the administrative centre of Novomakinsky Selsoviet, Suleyman-Stalsky District, Republic of Dagestan, Russia. Population: 3,791 (2021 census); 4,245 (2002 census); 2,065 (1989 Soviet census). There are 56 streets.

== Geography ==
Novaya Maka is located 165 km (103 mi) southeast of Makhachkala and 23 km (14 mi) northeast of Kasumkent (the district's administrative centre) by road. Chukhverkent is the nearest rural locality.
