= Chakhchakh-Kazmalyar =

Chakhchakh-Kazmalyar Чахчах-Казмаляр Чахчах Къазмаяр
- Selo
- Location within Republic of Dagestan Location within Russia
- Coordinates: 41°47′N 48°29′E
- Country: Russia
- Region: Republic of Dagestan
- District: Magaramkentsky District
- Time zone: UTC+3:00

Chakhchakh-Kazmalyar (Russian: Чахчах-Казмаляр; Lezgian: Чахчах Къазмаяр) is a rural locality (a selo) in Magaramkentsky District, Republic of Dagestan, Russia. The population was 1,927 as of 2010. There are 27 streets.

== Geography ==
Chakhchakh-Kazmalyar is located 29 km northeast of Magaramkent (the district's administrative centre) by road, on the left bank of the Samur River. Tagirkent-Kazmalyar and Kchun-Kazmalyar are the nearest rural localities.

== Nationalities ==
Lezgins live there.
