= Saytarkent =

Saytarkent Сайтаркент СайтIархуьр
- Selo
- Location within Republic of Dagestan Location within Russia
- Coordinates: 41°35′N 48°07′E
- Country: Russia
- Region: Republic of Dagestan
- District: Suleyman-Stalsky District
- Time zone: UTC+3:00

Saytarkent (Russian: Сайтаркент; Lezgian: СайтIархуьр) is a rural locality (a selo) in Ullugatagsky Selsoviet, Suleyman-Stalsky District, Republic of Dagestan, Russia. Population: 465 (2010 census); 431 (2002 census); 1,323 (1989 Soviet census). There are 4 streets.

== Geography ==
Saytarkent is located 13 km south of Kasumkent (the district's administrative centre) by road. Ptikent is the nearest rural locality.
