= Khodzha-Kazmalyar =

Khodzha-Kazmalyar Ходжа-Казмаляр Хужадхуьруьн Къазмаяр
- Selo
- Location within Republic of Dagestan Location within Russia
- Coordinates: 41°43′N 48°26′E
- Country: Russia
- Region: Republic of Dagestan
- District: Magaramkentsky District
- Time zone: UTC+3:00

Khodzha-Kazmalyar (Russian: Ходжа-Казмаляр; Lezgian: Хужадхуьруьн Къазмаяр) is a rural locality (a selo) in Magaramkentsky District, Republic of Dagestan, Russia. The population was 1,444 as of 2010. There are 14 streets.

== Geography ==
Khodzha-Kazmalyar is located 19 km northeast of Magaramkent (the district's administrative centre) by road, on the left bank of the Samur River. Filya and Novy Aul are the nearest rural localities.

== Nationalities ==
Lezgins live there.
