= Kachalkent =

Kachalkent Качалкент Гачалхуьр
- Selo
- Location within Republic of Dagestan Location within Russia
- Coordinates: 41°40′N 48°02′E
- Country: Russia
- Region: Republic of Dagestan
- District: Suleyman-Stalsky District
- Time zone: UTC+3:00

Kachalkent (Russian: Качалкент; Lezgian: Гачалхуьр) is a rural locality (a selo) in Tsmursky Selsoviet, Suleyman-Stalsky District, Republic of Dagestan, Russia. Population: 256 (2010 census); 237 (2002 census); 125 (1989 Soviet census).

== Geography ==
Kachalkent is located 12 km west of Kasumkent (the district's administrative centre) by road. Tsmur is the nearest rural locality.
