= Asalikent =

Asalikent Асаликент Асалдхуьр
- Selo
- Location within Republic of Dagestan Location within Russia
- Coordinates: 41°37′N 48°09′E
- Country: Russia
- Region: Republic of Dagestan
- District: Suleyman-Stalsky District
- Time zone: UTC+3:00

Asalikent (Russian: Асаликент; Lezgian: Асалдхуьр) is a rural locality (a selo) in Ispiksky Selsoviet, Suleyman-Stalsky District, Republic of Dagestan, Russia. Population: 324 (2010 census); 319 (2002 census); 185 (1989 Soviet census). There are 8 streets.

== Geography ==
Asalikent is located 194 km (121 mi) southeast of Makhachkala and 8 km (5.0 mi) southeast of Kasumkent (the district's administrative centre) by road. Salyan is the nearest rural locality.
