= Kchun-Kazmalyar =

Kchun-Kazmalyar Кчун-Казмаляр КчIун Къазм
- Selo
- Location within Republic of Dagestan Location within Russia
- Coordinates: 41°45′N 48°29′E
- Country: Russia
- Region: Republic of Dagestan
- District: Magaramkentsky District
- Time zone: UTC+3:00

Kchun-Kazmalyar (Russian: Кчун-Казмаляр; Lezgian: КчIун Къазм) is a rural locality (a selo) in Kabir-Kazmalyarsky Selsoviet, Magaramkentsky District, Republic of Dagestan, Russia. The population was 377 as of 2010. There are 13 streets.

== Geography ==
Kchun-Kazmalyar is located 26 km northeast of Magaramkent (the district's administrative centre) by road. Gazardkam-Kazmalyar and Kabir-Kazmalyar are the nearest rural localities.

== Nationalities ==
Lezgins live there.
