= Nyutyug =

Nyutyug Нютюг НуьцIуьгъ
- Selo
- Location within Republic of Dagestan Location within Russia
- Coordinates: 41°45′N 48°06′E
- Country: Russia
- Region: Republic of Dagestan
- District: Suleyman-Stalsky District
- Time zone: UTC+3:00

Nyutyug (Russian: Нютюг; Lezgian: НуьцIуьгъ) is a rural locality (a selo) in Karchagsky Selsoviet, Suleyman-Stalsky District, Republic of Dagestan, Russia. Population: 1,231 (2010 census); 1,080 (2002 census); 770 (1989 Soviet census). There are 13 streets.

== Geography ==
Nyutyug is located on the Yergilchay River, 177 km (110 mi) southeast of Makhachkala and 13 km (8.1 mi) northwest of Kasumkent (the district's administrative centre) by road. Zizik is the nearest rural locality.
