= Kabir-Kazmalyar =

Kabir-Kazmalyar Кабир-Казмаляр Къепӏир Къазмаяр
- Selo
- Location within Republic of Dagestan Location within Russia
- Coordinates: 41°44′N 48°29′E
- Country: Russia
- Region: Republic of Dagestan
- District: Magaramkentsky District
- Time zone: UTC+3:00

Kabir-Kazmalyar (Russian: Кабир-Казмаляр; Lezgian: Къепӏир Къазмаяр) is a rural locality (a selo) and the administrative centre of Kabir-Kazmalyarsky Selsoviet, Magaramkentsky District, Republic of Dagestan, Russia. The population was 2,189 as of 2010. There are 36 streets.

== Geography ==
Kabir-Kazmalyar is located between Novo-Filya and Chakhchakh-Kazmalyar, 25 km northeast of Magaramkent (the district's administrative centre) by road. Gazardkam-Kazmalyar and Filya are the nearest rural localities.

== Nationalities ==
Lezgins live there.
