= Yarukvalar =

Yarukvalar Яруквалар Ярукьвалар
- Selo
- Location within Republic of Dagestan Location within Russia
- Coordinates: 41°47′N 48°24′E
- Country: Russia
- Region: Republic of Dagestan
- District: Magaramkentsky District
- Time zone: UTC+3:00

Yarukvalar (Russian: Яруквалар; Lezgian: Ярукьвалар) is a rural locality (a selo) in Oruzhbinsky Selsoviet, Magaramkentsky District, Republic of Dagestan, Russia. The population was 433 as of 2010. There are 14 streets.

== Geography ==
Yarukvalar is located 156 km southeast of Makhachkala, on the right bank of the Gyulgerychay River. Darkush-Kazmalyar and Kartas-Kazmalyar are the nearest rural localities.

== Nationalities ==
Lezgins live there.
