= Tagirkent, Magaramkentsky District, Republic of Dagestan =

Tagirkent Тагиркент ТIигьир
- Selo
- Location within Republic of Dagestan Location within Russia
- Coordinates: 41°36′N 48°18′E
- Country: Russia
- Region: Republic of Dagestan
- District: Magaramkentsky District
- Time zone: UTC+3:00

Tagirkent (Russian: Тагиркент; Lezgian: ТIигьир) is a rural locality (a selo) in Magaramkentsky Selsoviet, Magaramkentsky District, Republic of Dagestan, Russia. The population was 360 as of 2010. There are 6 streets.

== Geography ==
Tagirkent is located 102 km south of Makhachkala. Tagzirkent and Susakent are the nearest rural localities.

== Nationalities ==
Lezgins live there.
