= Gilyar =

Gilyar Гильяр Гьиляр
- Selo
- Location within Republic of Dagestan Location within Russia
- Coordinates: 41°33′N 48°15′E
- Country: Russia
- Region: Republic of Dagestan
- District: Magaramkentsky District
- Time zone: UTC+3:00

Gilyar (Russian: Гильяр; Lezgian: Гьиляр) is a rural locality (a selo) in Magaramkentsky District, Republic of Dagestan, Russia. The population was 2,022 as of 2010. There are 23 streets.

== Geography ==
Gilyar is located on the left bank of the Samur River, 11 km southwest of Magaramkent (the district's administrative centre) by road. Kuysun and Dzhepel are the nearest rural localities.

== Nationalities ==
Lezgins live there.
