= Narvik Sırxayev =

Soviet Azerbaijani footballer and coach

Personal information
- Full name: Narvik Zagidinoviç Sırxayev
- Date of birth: 16 March 1974 (age 52)
- Place of birth: Orta-Stal, Suleyman-Stalsky District, Russian SFSR
- Height: 1.79 m (5 ft 10 1/2 in)
- Position: Midfielder

Youth career
- RSDYuShOR-2 Makhachkala

Senior career*
Years	Team	Apps	(Gls)
1991	Dynamo Makhachkala	20	(6)
1992	Dynamo Makhachkala (amateur)		
1993–1994	Dynamo Makhachkala	41	(5)
1994	Anzhi Makhachkala	28	(2)
1995–1996	Dynamo Makhachkala	56	(32)
1997–2001	Anzhi Makhachkala	177	(53)
2002–2003	Lokomotiv Moscow	33	(6)
2004	FC Moscow	15	(2)
2004–2006	Terek Grozny	64	(7)
2007	Anzhi Makhachkala	25	(5)
2008	Olimpik Baku	1	(0)

International career
1997–1999	Azerbaijan	17	(1)

Managerial career
- 2009: Lokomotiv-2 Moscow (assistant)
- 2010–2012: Lokomotiv-2 Moscow (youth team coach)
- 2012–2014: Anzhi Makhachkala (vice general director)
- 2014–2016: Anzhi Makhachkala (director of sports)
- * Club domestic league appearances and goals

Narvik Zagidinoviç Sırxayev (Russian: Нарвик Загидинович Сирхаев; born 16 March 1974) is a former Soviet and Azerbaijani footballer and a football coach of Lezgin origin. He also holds Russian citizenship.

== National team statistics ==
Azerbaijan national team
Year	Apps	Goals
1997	5	0
1998	8	1
1999	4	0
Total	17	1

=== International goals ===
#	Date	Venue	Opponent	Score	Result	Competition
1.	24 April 1998	Baku, Azerbaijan	Uzbekistan	2-0	2-1	Friendly

== Honors ==
- Russian Super Cup: 2003
