= Ekendil =

Ekendil Экендиль ЭкъвентIил
- Selo
- Location within Republic of Dagestan Location within Russia
- Coordinates: 41°45′N 48°07′E
- Country: Russia
- Region: Republic of Dagestan
- District: Suleyman-Stalsky District
- Time zone: UTC+3:00

Ekendil (Russian: Экендиль; Lezgian: ЭкъвентIил) is a rural locality (a selo) in Karchagsky Selsoviet, Suleyman-Stalsky District, Republic of Dagestan, Russia. Population: 470 (2010 census); 398 (2002 census); 256 (1989 Soviet census). There are 13 streets.

== Geography ==
Ekendil is located on the Yergilchay River, 176 km (109 mi) southeast of Makhachkala and 13 km (8.1 mi) north of Kasumkent (the district's administrative centre) by road. Nyuyug is the nearest rural locality.
