= Khtun-Kazmalyar =

Khtun-Kazmalyar Хтун-Казмаляр Хтун Къазмаяр
- Selo
- Location within Republic of Dagestan Location within Russia
- Coordinates: 41°48′N 48°31′E
- Country: Russia
- Region: Republic of Dagestan
- District: Magaramkentsky District
- Time zone: UTC+3:00

Khtun-Kazmalyar (Russian: Хтун-Казмаляр; Lezgian: Хтун Къазмаяр) is a rural locality (a selo) in Tagirkent-Kazmalyarsky Selsoviet, Magaramkentsky District, Republic of Dagestan, Russia. The population was 1,509 as of 2010. There are 5 streets.

== Geography ==
Khtun-Kazmalyar is located 181 km southeast of Makhachkala. Tagirkent-Kazmalyar and Bilbil-Kazmalyar are the nearest rural localities.

== Nationalities ==
Lezgins live there.
