= Ispik, Republic of Dagestan =

Ispik Испик
- Selo
- Location within Republic of Dagestan Location within Russia
- Coordinates: 41°36′N 48°11′E
- Country: Russia
- Region: Republic of Dagestan
- District: Suleyman-Stalsky District
- Time zone: UTC+3:00

Ispik (Russian: Испик) is a rural locality (a selo) and the administrative centre of Ispiksky Selsoviet, Suleyman-Stalsky District, Republic of Dagestan, Russia. Population: 1,277 (2010 census); 352 (2002 census); 185 (1989 Soviet census). There are 7 streets.

== Geography ==
Ispik is located 196 km (122 mi) southeast of Makhachkala and 10 km (6.2 mi) southeast of Kasumkent (the district's administrative centre) by road. Butkent is the nearest rural locality.
