= Zizik =

Zizik may refer to:

- Zizik, Qabala, Azerbaijan
- Zizik, Quba, Azerbaijan
- Zizik, Republic of Dagestan, Russia
