= Yusuf bek Kurinski =

Russian khan (1806–1878)

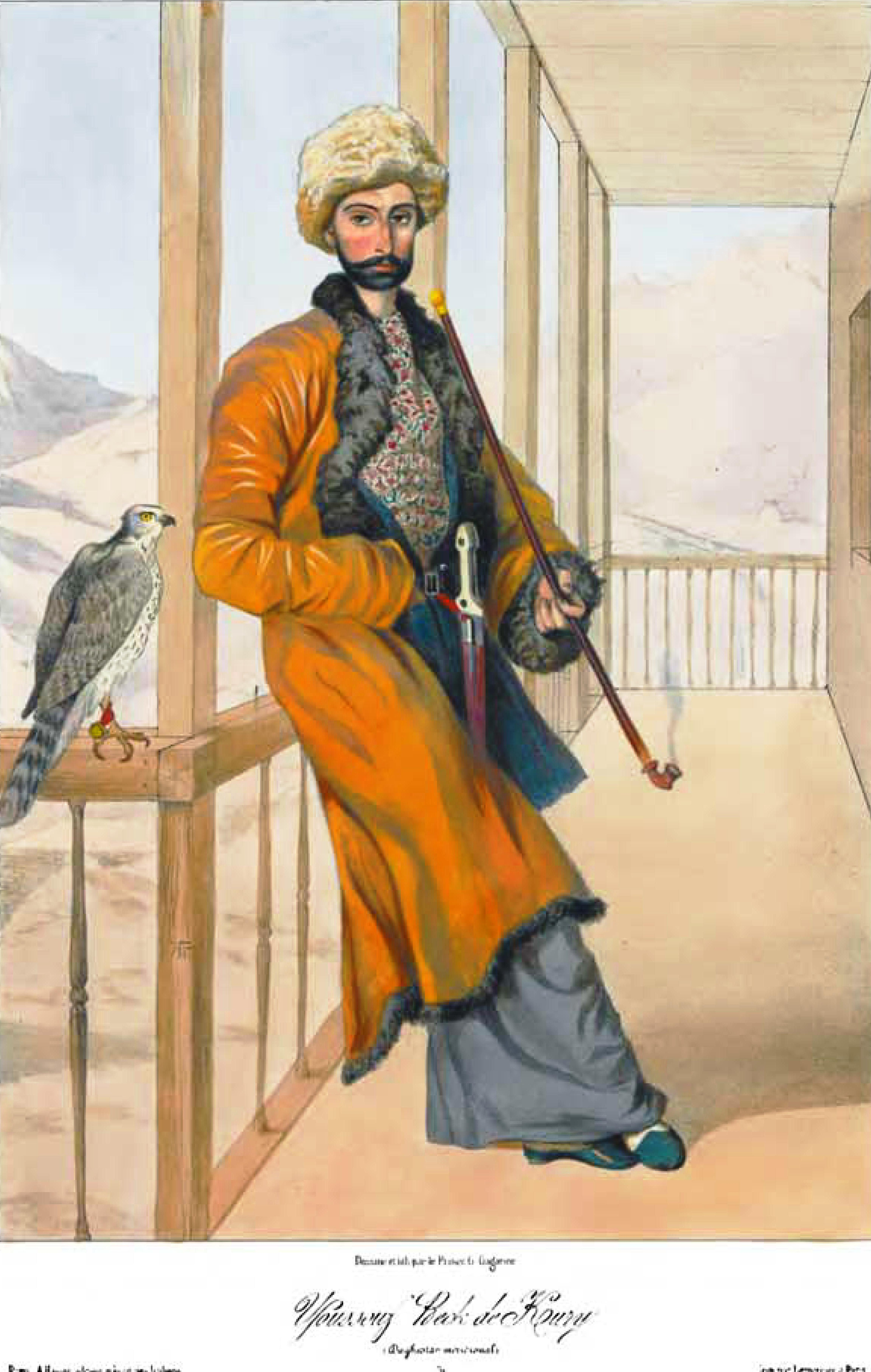
- Yusuf bek by Grigory Gagarin, 1845

Khan of Kura
- Reign: 1842 - 1864
- Predecessor: Harun bek Kurinski
- Successor: title abolished
- Born: 1806; Gazikumukh Khanate
- Died: December 19, 1878 (aged 71–72); Derbent, Russian Empire
- Buried: Kyrkhlyar
- Wars and battles: Caucasian War

Yusuf bek Kurinski (Russian: Юсуф-бек Кюринский, Lezgian: Йусуф-бек ал-Кази-Гумуки ал-Кури) was the last khan of Kura Khanate, as well as a general-major of Imperial Russian army.

== Career ==
He was born in 1806 to Tahir bek, brother of Aslan bek, the first khan of Kura Khanate. He entered military service in the early 1820s in the cavalry of the Separate Caucasian Corps and from 1823 took part in campaigns against the mountaineers, served in the Caucasian militia units.

In 1831, during the occupation of the village of Madzhalis in Dagestan, he was wounded by a rifle bullet in his left hand with damage to two fingers, and on March 14, 1832, he was promoted to warrant officer for the distinguish. He also took part in the 1839 campaign in the Caucasus and was awarded the Order of St. Vladimir of the 4th degree with a bow.

However, his brother Harun bek changed sides after the uprising of Imam Shamil. In 1842, when the forces of Imam Shamil approached Gazikumukh, Harun bek went over to the side of the imam, surrendering to him the fortress with a garrison and ammunition. Yusuf bek's other brother, al-Hajj Yahya, was one of Shamil's followers. Harun bek himself was sent back by Shamil to Kurakh, and his son Abbas-bek was taken as hostage. However, soon thereafter, the Russian detachment under the command of Colonel Zalivkin arrested Harun bek and sent him to Tbilisi. Meanwhile, Yusuf bek received the 4th degree of the Order of St. George on August 18, 1844, as staff captain for his participation in battles against Imam Shamil and as the Khan. He was promoted to the rank of major on August 19, 1845, and received a golden saber with the inscription "For Bravery". Harun bek returned to rule in 1847 and died thenext year. Then, from 1848 until the very end of the existence of the khanate in 1864, the rule reverted to Yusuf bek.

In 1849, he was promoted to colonel, and on October 1, 1852, to major general. On August 26, 1856, he was admitted to the Retinue of His Majesty. Continuing his service in the Caucasus and returned to Kura in 1859. However, he was an unpopular ruler among his subjects, who rose up against him in 1860 and sent attorneys to Caucasus Viceroyalty, demanding his deposition. Yusuf bek, after making a hajj to Mecca (pilgrimage) on 2 September 1862, finally resigned from his khanate in 1864 and instead enrolled in the army cavalry in the Caucasian army in 1865. The khanate was abolished and incorporated into Kyurinsky okrug of Dagestan Oblast. He finally retired from Imperial army in May 1876.

== Death ==
Yusuf-bek died in the city of Derbent on December 19, 1878, and was buried at the Kirkhlar cemetery. The historian Mirza Hasan Alkadari described him as a God-fearing, charitable and religious person.

== Family ==
He had several wives and 8 sons. Known wives include Agha bike, Begüm bike and Selmi-biad. Known sons are Haji Muhammad bek, Haji Sadig bek, Khalid bek, Shahmardan bek, Tahir bek, Muhammad Nutsal bek and Omar bek. His grandson Aliyar bey Hashimbeyov served as governor of Zaqatala Governorate in Azerbaijan Democratic Republic. His descendants bear the surname Yusufkhanov (Russian: Юсуфханов).

== Awards ==
- Order of St. Vladimir, 4th degree (1839)
- Order of St. George, 4th degree (1844)
- Golden weapon "For Bravery" (1845)
- Order of St. Vladimir, 3rd degree (1861)
- Order of St. Stanislaus, 1st degree (1861)
- Order of St. Anna, 1st degree (1871)
