= Maka-Kazmalyar =

Maka-Kazmalyar Мака-Казмаляр Макьар Къазмаяр
- Selo
- Location within Republic of Dagestan Location within Russia
- Coordinates: 41°28′N 48°01′E
- Country: Russia
- Region: Republic of Dagestan
- District: Magaramkentsky District
- Time zone: UTC+3:00

Maka-Kazmalyar (Russian: Мака-Казмаляр; Lezgian: Макьар Къазмаяр) is a rural locality (a selo) in Garakhsky Selsoviet, Magaramkentsky District, Republic of Dagestan, Russia. The population was 152 as of 2010. There are 2 streets.

== Geography ==
Maka-Kazmalyar is located 215 km southeast of Makhachkala, on the right bank of the Samur River. Garakh and Novoye Karakyure are the nearest rural localities.

== Nationalities ==
Lezgins live there.
