= Orta-Stal =

Orta-Stal Орта-Стал Кьулан Стӏал
- Selo
- Location within Republic of Dagestan Location within Russia
- Coordinates: 41°42′N 48°10′E
- Country: Russia
- Region: Republic of Dagestan
- District: Suleyman-Stalsky District
- Time zone: UTC+3:00

Orta-Stal (Russian: Орта-Стал; Lezgian: Кьулан Стӏал) is a rural locality (a selo) Suleyman-Stalsky District, Republic of Dagestan, Russia. Population: 2,868 (2021 census); 2,602 (2002 census); 1,881 (1989 Soviet census). There are 55 streets.

== Geography ==
Orta-Stal is located 4 km north of Kasumkent (the district's administrative centre) by road. Yukhari-Stal is the nearest rural locality.
