= Kartas-Kazmalyar =

Kartas-Kazmalyar Картас-Казмаляр КIартас Къазма
- Selo
- Location within Republic of Dagestan Location within Russia
- Coordinates: 41°49′N 48°23′E
- Country: Russia
- Region: Republic of Dagestan
- District: Magaramkentsky District
- Time zone: UTC+3:00

Kartas-Kazmalyar (Russian: Картас-Казмаляр; Lezgian: КIартас-Къазма) is a rural locality (a selo) in Magaramkentsky District, Republic of Dagestan, Russia. The population was 1,820 as of 2010. There are 21 streets.

== Geography ==
Kartas-Kazmalyar is located 29 km northeast of Magaramkent (the district's administrative centre) by road, on the left bank of the Gyulgerichay River. Darkush-Kazmalyar and Kullar are the nearest rural localities.

== Nationalities ==
Lezgins live there.
