= Khtun =

Khtun Хтун
- Selo
- Location within Republic of Dagestan Location within Russia
- Coordinates: 41°35′N 48°10′E
- Country: Russia
- Region: Republic of Dagestan
- District: Suleyman-Stalsky District
- Time zone: UTC+3:00

Khtun (Russian: Хтун) is a rural locality (a selo) in Shikhikentsky Selsoviet, Suleyman-Stalsky District, Republic of Dagestan, Russia. Population: 139 (2010 census); 144 (2002 census); 51 (1989 Soviet census).

== Geography ==
Khtun is located 14 km south of Kasumkent (the district's administrative centre) by road. Butkent is the nearest rural locality.
