= Sardarkent =

Sardarkent Сардаркент СартIархуьр
- Selo
- Location within Republic of Dagestan Location within Russia
- Coordinates: 41°43′N 48°03′E
- Country: Russia
- Region: Republic of Dagestan
- District: Suleyman-Stalsky District
- Time zone: UTC+3:00

Sardarkent (Russian: Сардаркент; Lezgian: СартIархуьр) is a rural locality (a selo) in Alkadarsky Selsoviet, Suleyman-Stalsky District, Republic of Dagestan, Russia. Population: 718 (2010 census); 718 (2002 census); 442 (1989 Soviet census). There are 14 streets.

== Geography ==
Sardarkent is located on the left bank of the Chiragchay River, 9 km northwest of Kasumkent (the district's administrative centre) by road. Chilikar and Koshkent are the nearest rural localities.

== Nationalities ==
As in other parts of Suleyman-Stalsky, Sardarkent is home to a substantial population of Lezgins, a Northeast Caucasian ethnic group native to southern Dagestan.
