= Tsmur =

Tsmur Цмур
- Selo
- Location within Republic of Dagestan Location within Russia
- Coordinates: 41°41′N 48°03′E
- Country: Russia
- Region: Republic of Dagestan
- District: Suleyman-Stalsky District
- Time zone: UTC+3:00

Tsmur (Russian: Цмур) is a rural locality (a selo) and the administrative centre of Tsmursky Selsoviet, Suleyman-Stalsky District, Republic of Dagestan, Russia. Population: 626 (2010 census); 584 (2002 census); 258 (1989 Soviet census). There are 8 streets.

== Geography ==
Tsmur is located 9 km west of Kasumkent (the district's administrative centre) by road. Kachalkent is the nearest rural locality.
