= Mirza Hasan Alkadari =

Mirza Hasan ad-Daghistani al-Kuri Alkadari
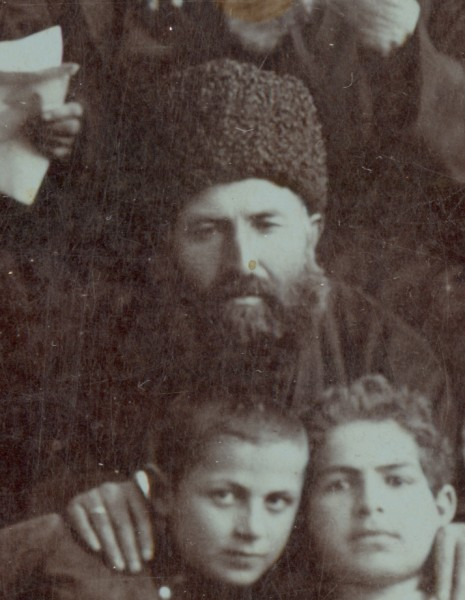
- Hasan Alkadari in 1907
- Born: 15 October 1834; Balakhani, Dagestan, Caucasian Imamate
- Died: 12 September 1910 (aged 75); Alkadar, Dagestan Oblast, Russian Empire
- Notable work: Kitāb Āthār-i Dāghistān

Mirza Hasan Alkadari (Lezgian: Хьасан Абдуллагьан хва Алкьвадарви) was a North Caucasian Islamic jurist (faqih), historian, poet, educator in pre-revolutionary Dagestan.

== Biography ==
He was born in Balakhani village, located in modern Untsukulsky District (not to be confused with Balakhani, Azerbaijan) on 15 October 1834 to an ethnic Lezgi family. His father Abdullah was from the village of Alkadar in Kura Khanate (now Suleiman-Stalsky district) moved to the village of Balakhani together with his teacher and father-in-law Muhammad Yaraghi because of pressure by Aslan bek, ruler of Kura Khanate. Abdullah Alkadari was considered a great connoisseur of various sciences: grammar, logic, the Quran, Hadith studies, interpretation of dreams, mathematics, the basics of versification, etc.

He studied in the village of Akhty under Mirza Ali al-Akhti. He studied the works of famous oriental authors on astronomy "Sharh al-Mulahhas" and philosophy "Sharh al-Hidayat". Alkadari spoke of al-Akhty with great respect and pride and dedicated several of his qasid-panegyrics to him. Alkadari studied the basics of Islamic jurisprudence under him, as well as become fluent in Arabic, Turkic and Persian languages. He wrote in Azerbaijani language as well.

After graduation he taught Arabic language at his native Alkadar. Alkadari served as a secretary of Yusuf Khan, khan of Kura, a member of the district court (divanbegi) and naib of South Tabasaran. For twelve years he wrote books and collaborated with well-known newspapers and magazines at that time. He also carried on a lively correspondence with prominent scientists, poets, and religious figures. As an Islamic jurist, his approach to hadiths were somewhat liberal, he was not against adopting European customs of clothing, gramophone and was a reader of Molla Nasraddin, an Azerbaijani magazine criticizing mullahs at the time.

He received the rank of cadet while serving as an employee in the Kyurinsky district court in 1865. He was promoted to ensign when he was the naib of South Tabasaran in 1867. In 1871, he rose to be second lieutenant and in 1874 a lieutenant.

After the uprising in Dagestan and Chechnya broke out in 1877, Alkadari was accused of participating in this uprising. He was imprisoned and exiled to the city of Spassk, Tambov Governorate in 1879. In Spassk, he entered into close ties with local Tatar Muslims, as he possessed knowledge of Islam and Sharia. Alkadari described in detail his impressions of the land in which he had to spend four years in the book "Divan al-Mamnun". In 1883 he was able to return under the amnesty announced by Alexander III. After returning from exile, Hasan opened a school in his native village. There he taught basic knowledge of reading, writing, arithmetic, geography, astronomy, history of Dagestan. He also contributed to Akinchi newspaper in Baku with pen-name "Mamnun" from 1875 to 1876 and to Ziya newspaper published in Tbilisi between 1879 and 1880. Firidun bey Kocharli in his Topics on the History of Azerbaijani Literature considered him an Azerbaijani poet.

== Works ==
Alkadari is the author of many books in classical Arabic, Turkic, Persian, languages. Particularly famous is his famous historical chronicle Kitāb Āthār-i Dāghistān ("Historical information about Dagestan"), which covered the history of the peoples of Dagestan for many centuries. The first edition of the book was published in 1903 in Baku in the Azerbaijani language by financial support from Haji Zeynalabdin Taghiyev, and in Makhachkala, 1929 the book was published in Russian (the translator was the son of Alkadari - Ali Hasanov). He wrote "Jirab al-Mamnun" in 1910 and published in 1912, which outlined the main provisions of the Sharia (mainly Shafi'i legal school) and other issues on Islam. He wrote "Divan al-Mamnun" in 1913 - a collection of poems, in which the events of 1877 were described in detail.

== Family ==
Alkadari was married to Salikhat khanum (1843-1908) had 7 sons and 5 daughters:

1. Ahmed (1853-1929)
2. Abu Muslim (1861-1911) — naib of Tabasaran, educated in St. Petersburg, served as a lieutenant in the personal guard of Alexander III
  1. Ali Iskander (d. 1943) — public servant and statesman, author of the first "Geography of Dagestan", a textbook for Dagestani schools
3. Afisat (1865-1916)
4. Abdullah (1865-1916)
5. Abdul Ali (1868-1928) — a well-known orientalist, translated Kitāb Āthār-i Dāghistān from Azerbaijani into Russian
  1. Gotfrid Hasanrin (1900-1965) — composer, founder of Dagestan classical music, laureate of State prizes.
  2. Henrikh Hasanrin (1910-1973) — Rear Admiral, constructor, Lenin and State Prize Laureate, Hero of Socialist Labor
6. Abdurakhman (1869-1892)
7. Zainab (1871-1872)
8. Reyhanat (1873-1953)
9. Abdul-Latif (1871-1935)
10. Abidat (1877-1923)
11. Sekinat (1881-1882)
12. Abdul-Hakim (1883-1888)
