= Butkent =

Butkent Буткент Бутахуьр
- Selo
- Location within Republic of Dagestan Location within Russia
- Coordinates: 41°35′N 48°10′E
- Country: Russia
- Region: Republic of Dagestan
- District: Suleyman-Stalsky District
- Time zone: UTC+3:00

Butkent (Russian: Буткент; Lezgian: Бутахуьр) is a rural locality (a selo) in Shikhikentsky Selsoviet, Suleyman-Stalsky District, Republic of Dagestan, Russia. Population: 459 (2010 census); 537 (2002 census); 262 (1989 Soviet census). There are 3 streets.

== Geography ==
Butkent is located 12 km south of Kasumkent (the district's administrative centre) by road. Shikhikent is the nearest rural locality.
