= Ashaga-Arag =

Ashaga-Arag Ашага-Араг Juhuro-Arag Lower Arag
- Village
- Location within Republic of Dagestan Location within Russia
- Coordinates: 41°38′30″N 48°08′52″E
- Country: Russia
- Region: Republic of Dagestan
- District: Suleyman-Stalsky District

Population
  - Total: 0
- Time zone: UTC+03:00

Ashaga-Arag, also known as Juhuro-Arag, Lower Arag (Russian: Ашага-Араг, Judeo-Tat: Ошугъэ-Орогь) is an abandoned Lezgins aul in the Suleyman-Stalsky District of Dagestan.

== Geography ==
The village is located in the foothills of the Suleiman Stalsky district. On the right bank of the Arag River, 2 km southwest of the village of Kasumkent.

== History ==
Ashaga-Arag is a historical Mountain-Jewish village.

Before Dagestan joined the Russian Empire, the village was part of the Kartas mahallah of the Kura Khanate. After the annexation of the Khanate to the Russian Empire, Ashaga-Arag was listed in the Kasumkent rural community of the Guney naib of the Kyurinsky district of the Dagestan region.

In 1895, the village consisted of 200 households, of which 115 households were Mountain Jews. In the early 1900s, the village was divided into Jewish and Lezgin rural communities. After the 1917 revolution, most of the Jews left the village. According to the 1926 census, the village consisted of 124 households.

Administratively, it was the center of the Ashaga-Arag village council of the Kasumkent district. In the 1930s, a state farm was created in the village, which until 1957 was named after Kashin, then “40 Years of October”. In 1964, the “Kasumkent” state farm was created.

In 1969, a decision was made on the planned resettlement of village residents to the village of Kasumkent.

== Population ==
Year	1886	1895	1908	1926	1939	1970
Population	713	1140	1310	590	506	20

As of 1886, 100% of the village’s population were Mountain Jews. By 1895, their number in the village had decreased to 66% and remained virtually unchanged until the 1917 revolution.

According to the All-Union Population Census of 1926, in the national population structure Lezgins made up 71%, Mountain Jews - 29%.
