= Zizik, Republic of Dagestan =

Zizik Зизик Цицик
- Selo
- Location within Republic of Dagestan Location within Russia
- Coordinates: 41°46′N 48°06′E
- Country: Russia
- Region: Republic of Dagestan
- District: Suleyman-Stalsky District
- Time zone: UTC+3:00

Zizik (Russian: Зизик; Lezgian: Цицик) is a rural locality (a selo) in Karchagsky Selsoviet, Suleyman-Stalsky District, Republic of Dagestan, Russia. Population: 1,238 (2010 census); 1,079 (2002 census); 855 (1989 Soviet census). There are 15 streets.

== Geography ==
Zizik is located on the Karchagsu River, 176 km (109 mi) southeast of Makhachkala and 15 km (9.3 mi) north of Kasumkent (the district's administrative centre) by road. Nyutyug is the nearest rural locality.
