= Aliyar bey Hashimbeyov =

Imperial Russian army general (1856–1920)

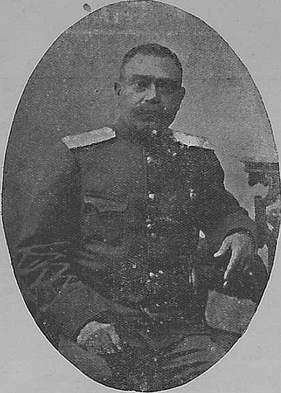
- Native name: Əliyar bəy Haşımbəyov
- Born: March 8, 1856 Baku, Baku Governorate
- Died: May 29, 1920 (aged 64) Boyuk Zira, Azerbaijan SSR
- Branch: Artillery
- Rank: Major-General

Aliyar bek Hashimbekov (Russian: Алияр-бек Мехтиевич Гашимбеков; Azerbaijani: Əliyar bəy Haşımbəyov; 1856–1920) — Imperial Russian and Azerbaijani statesman and military leader of Kumyk origin, major-general.

== Early years ==
He was born to Kumyk noble family on 8 March 1856 in Baku. His father colonel Mehdigulu bek Hashimbekov was naib of West Tabasaran. According to Lezgi historian Mirza Hasan Alkadari, he was descended from ruling clan of Mehtuli Khanate. His grandfather was Yusuf bek Kurinski, was khan of Kura Khanate between 1859 and 1864. He had a younger brother - Hasan bek Hashimbekov (1860-?).

He started his education in Baku Real School, then entered the military service on August 23, 1873, as an ordinary cadet at the Pavlovsk Military School, then studied at the Mikhailovsk Artillery School. On April 16, 1878, he was released as a second lieutenant in the 21st artillery brigade. On December 18 of the same year, he was promoted to lieutenant.

== Service under Russian Empire ==
In January 1882, he was appointed executing the affairs of the Childir bailiff with the status of field light artillery. Next month, on February 6 he was transferred to the Khorosan bailiff but moved back on March 13 to Childir again. He was promoted to staff captain on May 15, 1883. On July 7, he was appointed military governor of the Saganlug section (near modern Şendurak, Oltu) of the Kars Oblast.

He was promoted to junior assistant on December 19, 1883, and from November 8, 1884, served as senior assistant to military governor of Kars Oblast. He was promoted to captain on August 30, 1884. 12 years later, on March 9, 1896, he was appointed military governor of Ardahan district. 3 years later he became military governor of Kağızman, another administrative division of Kars Oblast on March 4, 1899.

He became colonel on December 6, 1901. And reappointed as assistant to the military governor of the Kars Oblast on May 26, 1908. He finally was promoted to the rank of major general on 6 December 1908. On July 14, 1913, by the Imperial order, Hashimbekov was dismissed from service due to illness as a lieutenant general, with a uniform and a pension. Since that time, he served as an honorary judge of the peace.

However, he was recalled to military service after breakout of World War I. He was reassigned to serve with the former rank of major general with the appointment of the commander of the 3rd Caucasian convoy brigade and enrollment in the army infantry on June 21, 1916.

== Service under Azerbaijan Democratic Republic ==
After the proclamation of the Azerbaijan Democratic Republic, he was appointed governor of the newly created Zaqatala Governorate on 26 June 1918. He was dismissed from this post on 16 March 1919 and was appointed governor-general of South-West Azerbaijan Governorate (encompassing modern Nakhchivan) instead. From August 1919, he served in the Azerbaijani army as the head of the Intendant Directorate. He was dismissed from service due to illness on February 19, 1920. He was arrested by Azerbaijan Soviet Socialist Republic authorities and executed by firing squad on May 29, 1920, in Nargin Island.

== Awards ==
1. Order of St. Stanislaus, 3rd degree (1889)
2. Order of St. Anna, 3rd degree (1894)
3. Order of St. Stanislaus, 2nd degree (1895)
4. Order of St. Anna, 2nd degree (1898)
5. Order of St. Vladimir, 4th degree (1904)
6. Order of St. Vladimir, 3rd degree (1911)
