= Tsnal =

Tsnal Цнал
- Selo
- Location within Republic of Dagestan Location within Russia
- Coordinates: 41°41′N 47°59′E
- Country: Russia
- Region: Republic of Dagestan
- District: Khivsky District
- Time zone: UTC+3:00

Tsnal (Russian: Цнал) is a rural locality (a selo) in Khivsky District, Republic of Dagestan, Russia. Population: 655 (2021 census); 672 (2010 census); 531 (1989 Soviet census). There are 10 streets in this selo.

== Geography ==
It is located 24;km from Khiv (the district's administrative centre), 148 km from Makhachkala (capital of Dagestan) and 1,785 km from Moscow. Ichin is the nearest rural locality.
