= Khanzhalkala =

Khanzhalkala Ханжалкала Хэнжелгъэле
- Village
- Location within Republic of Dagestan Location within Russia
- Coordinates: 41°42′N 48°19′E
- Country: Russia
- Region: Republic of Dagestan
- District: Magaramkentsky District

Population
  - Total: 0
- Time zone: UTC+03:00

Khanzhalkala (Khanzhal-Kala), also known as Khanjal-Kala (Russian: Ханжалкала, Ханжал-Кала; Judeo-Tat: Хэнжелгъэле, Гъэлей-хэнжел) is an abandoned Lezgin aul in the Magaramkentsky District of Dagestan. The name comes from Judeo-Tat and means "fortress of the dagger". It was protected not only by the steep slopes of the mountain on which it was located, but also by its fortress walls. It was abolished in 1968.

== Geography ==
The village was located in the foothills of the Magaramkentsky District, on the right bank of the Gyulgerychay River. Near the road bridge across the river on the federal "Caucasus Highway".

== History ==
In the 18th century, Khan of Derbent and Quba Fatali Khan created a separate Kura Khanate on the territory of Kura, but soon it was included in the Gazikumukh Khanate. Apparently, the Mountain Jews population in the Kura villages Mamrach (Mamrash), Ashaga-Arag appeared only after 1812, when they were invited there to settle by the Kura ruler Aslan Khan. Later, part of the Mountain Jews from Mamrach moved to the village of Khanzhalkala.

In the first half of the 20th century, Mountain Jews from Khanzhalkala gradually moved to Derbent. By the end of the 1950s of the 20th century, there were no more Mountain Jews left either in the Kurakhsky or in the Tabasaransky villages. The Mountain Jews’ cemeteries have been preserved.

== Population ==
| Year | 1886 | 1895 | 1908 | 1926 | 1939 |
|---|---|---|---|---|---|
| Population | 239 | 312 | 398 | 275 | 443 |

As of 1886, 100% of the village’s population were Mountain Jews. By 1895, the Mountain Jews population in the village had decreased to 79%. By 1908, the population of Mountain Jews had increased again and amounted to 91%.

According to the All-Union Population Census of 1926, in the national structure of the population Lezgins made up 23%, Mountain Jews - 67%.
