= FIY =

FIY or Fiy may refer to:

== FIY ==
- Federazione Italiana Yoga, the Italian member organization of the European Union of Yoga
- FIY, Royal Air Force squadron code for the No. 21 Elementary Flying Training School RAF unit

== Fiy ==
- Fiy, a rural locality in Republic of Dagestan, Russia
