= Ichin =

Ichin Ичин
- Selo
- Location within Republic of Dagestan Location within Russia
- Coordinates: 41°40′N 47°59′E
- Country: Russia
- Region: Republic of Dagestan
- District: Suleyman-Stalsky District
- Time zone: UTC+3:00

Ichin (Russian: Ичин) is a rural locality (a selo) in Tsmursky Selsoviet, Suleyman-Stalsky District, Republic of Dagestan, Russia. Population: 333 (2010 census); 318 (2002 census); 160 (1989 Soviet census).

== Geography ==
Ichin is located 15 km west of Kasumkent (the district's administrative centre) by road. Tsnal is the nearest rural locality.
