= Kurush, Dokuzparinsky District, Republic of Dagestan =

Kurush Куруш Къуруш
- Village
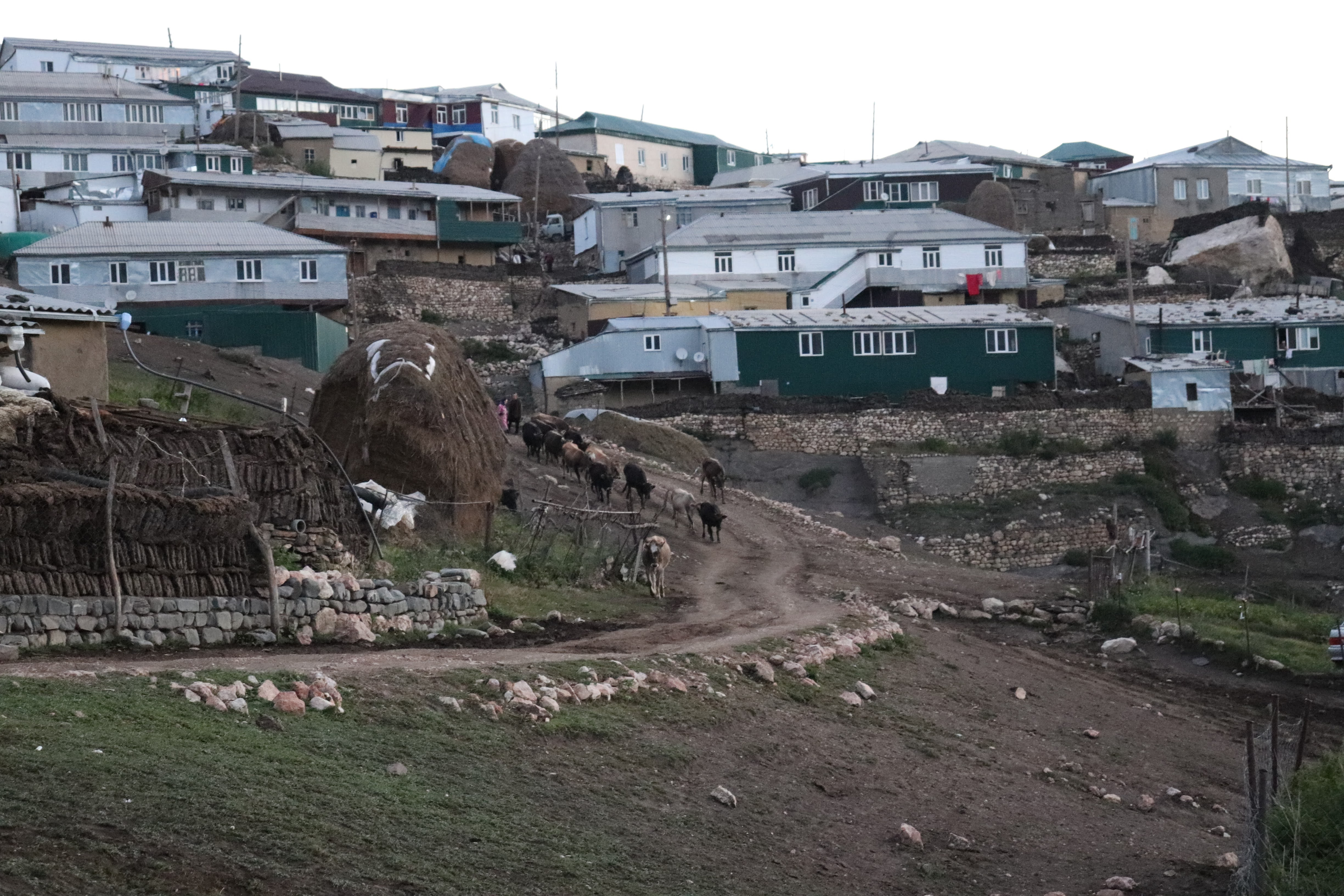

- Location within Republic of Dagestan Location within Russia
- Coordinates: 41°16′51″N 47°49′48″E
- Country: Russia
- Region: Dagestan
- District: Dokuzparinsky District
- Time zone: UTC+3:00

Kurush (Russian: Куруш; Lezgian: Къуруш) is a mountain village located in the Dokuzparinsky District, in southern Dagestan. Situated at 2480–2560 m above sea level depending on the source (topographical maps show the center at about 2530 m), it is the highest continuously inhabited settlement of the Greater Caucasus and of Europe as well as the southernmost settlement in Russia. As of 2015, Kurush had a population of 813.
