= Gdym =

Gdym Гдым Гутум
- Selo
- Location within Republic of Dagestan Location within Russia
- Coordinates: 41°18′N 47°28′E
- Country: Russia
- Region: Republic of Dagestan
- District: Akhtynsky District
- Time zone: UTC+3:00

Gdym (Russian: Гдым; Lezgian: Гутум) is a rural locality (a selo) in Akhtynsky District, Republic of Dagestan, Russia. The population was 388 as of 2010. There are 2 streets.

== Geography ==
Gdym is located on the Gdymchay River, 35 km southwest of Akhty (the district's administrative centre) by road. Fiy is the nearest rural locality.
