= Zirik =

- Municipality
- Location within Azerbaijan Location within Shaki-Zagatala Economic Region
- Coordinates: 40°51′32″N 47°39′42″E
- Country: Azerbaijan
- Rayon: Qabala

Population
  - Total: 1,026
- Time zone: UTC+4 (AZT)
  - Summer (DST): UTC+5 (AZT)

Zirik (also, Zizik) is a village and municipality in the Qabala Rayon of Azerbaijan. It has a population of 1,026.
