= Qımıl =

- Municipality
- Location within Azerbaijan
- Coordinates: 41°17′33″N 48°20′25″E
- Country: Azerbaijan
- Rayon: Quba
- Elevation: 952 m (3,123 ft)
- Time zone: UTC+4 (AZT)
  - Summer (DST): UTC+5 (AZT)

Qımıl (also, Gimil’, Qımılqazma, Qımıl-qazma, and Kymyl) is a village and municipality in the Quba Rayon of Azerbaijan. The Quba (Guba) District (khanate) has a regional population of 140,000. Quba, often referred to as Guba-Khachmaz, is located in the northeast of Azerbaijan, to the north of Baku.

Qimil is a mountain village set in a recreational area that runs parallel to the Gacres area, which is the most popular recreational area in the khanate. The Qimil municipality comprises the villages of Qımıl, Gazma, and Küsnətqazma. Approximately 3,879 people reside within 7 kilometers of Qimil.

== Qimil history ==
Since the first half of the 18th century, Quba has served as the regional administrative center for Qimil and surrounding villages. At that time, Khan Gusein Ali made Quba the capital of his widespread khanate and relocated his residence there. Later, Fatali Khan, his successor and most renowned ruler of Quba khanate, united disparate Azerbaijani areas under his reign, conquering all of northwest Azerbaijan from Derbent to Lankaran.

In 1813, Qimil, along with the rest of the Quba khanate, was incorporated into the Russian Empire.

== Qimil and the arts ==
Qimil is one of the centers of carpet-making in the Quba district. "Gimil" carpets are made in Qimil village, and can be found in museums and private collections around the world. The kolkhoz system of collective farming, introduced during the Soviet period, led to a decline in this craft. However, Qimil residents continued to weave carpets, primarily for dowries. In recent years, higher prices and a renewed interest in hand-made carpets has helped to revive the craft in the mountain villages.
