= Kyurinskiy okrug =

Coordinates: 41°40′N 48°08′E

Kyurinskiy okrug Кюринский округ
- Okrug
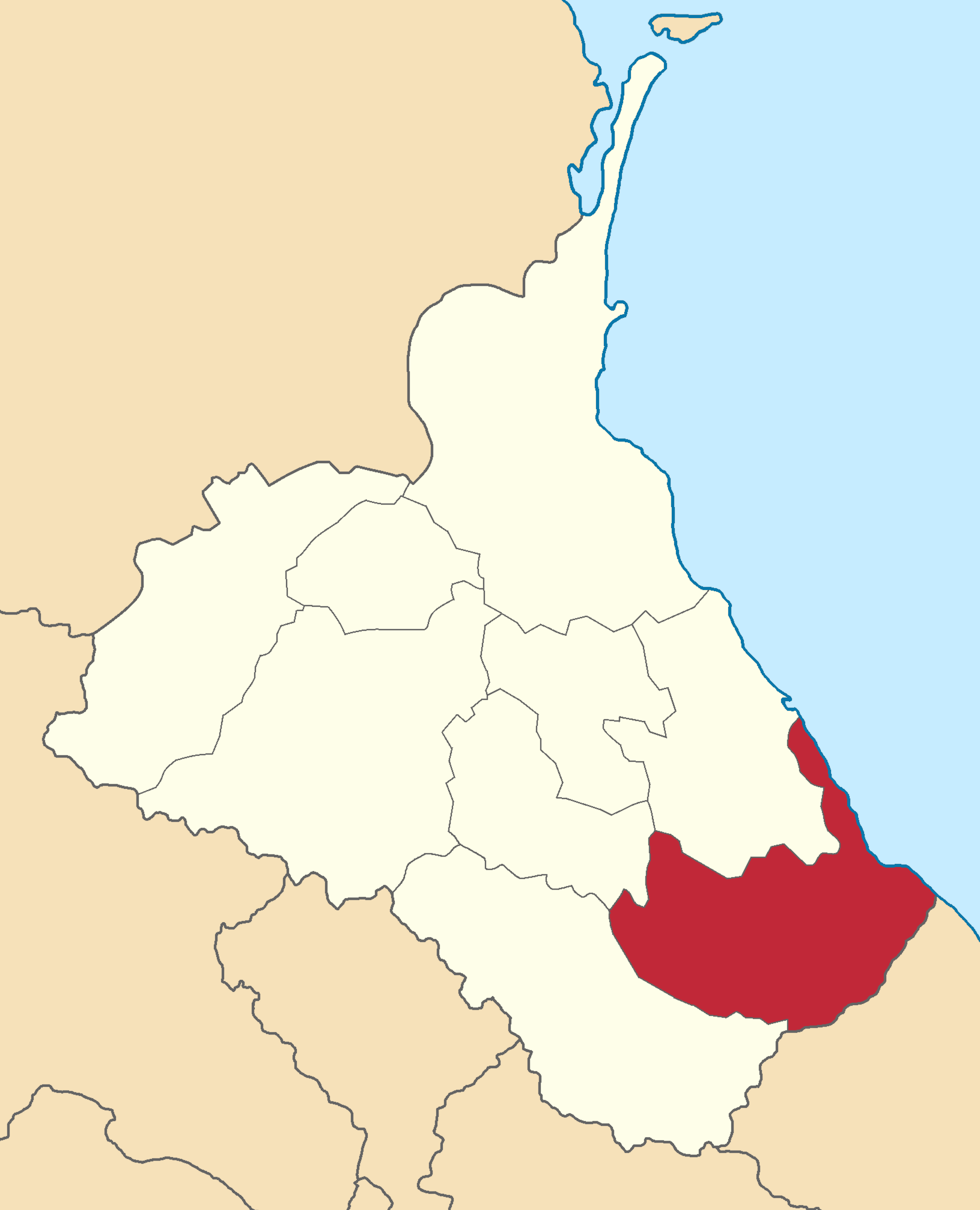
- Location in the Dagestan Oblast
- Country: Russian Empire
- Viceroyalty: Caucasus
- Oblast: Dagestan
- Established: 1865
- Abolished: 1928
- Capital: Kasumkent

Area
  - Total: 3,490.27 km^{2} (1,347.60 sq mi)

Population (1916)
  - Total: 117,218
  - Density: 33.5842/km^{2} (86.9827/sq mi)
  - Rural: 100.00%

The Kyurinskiy okrug (Note: Russian: Кюринский округ, pre-reform orthography: Кюринскій округъ [kʲʉrʲɪnskʲɪj ɐkrʊk]) was a district (okrug) of the Dagestan Oblast of the Caucasus Viceroyalty of the Russian Empire. The area of the Kyurinskiy okrug is included in contemporary Dagestan of the Russian Federation. The district's administrative centre was Kasumkent.

== Administrative divisions ==
The prefectures (участки, uchastki) of the Kyurinskiy okrug in 1917 were:

Name	1912 population	Area
Gyuneyskiy prefecture (Гюнейский участок)	21,162	673.73 square versts (766.75 km^{2}; 296.04 mi^{2})
Kurakhskiy prefecture (Курахский участок)	16,662	1,020.66 square versts (1,161.57 km^{2}; 448.49 mi^{2})
Kutur-Kyurinskiy prefecture (Кутур-Кюринский участок)	20,938	434.06 square versts (493.99 km^{2}; 190.73 mi^{2})
Yuzhno-Tabasaranskiy prefecture (Южно-Табасаранский участок)	20,023	610.10 square versts (694.33 km^{2}; 268.08 mi^{2})
Ulusskiy magal (Улусский магал)	2,688	328.30 square versts (373.63 km^{2}; 144.26 mi^{2})

== Demographics ==
=== Russian Empire Census ===
According to the Russian Empire Census, the Kyurinskiy okrug had a population of 77,680 on 28 January [O.S. 15 January] 1897, including 39,039 men and 38,641 women. The majority of the population indicated Kyurin to be their mother tongue, with a significant Kazi-Kumukh speaking minority.

Linguistic composition of the Kyurinskiy okrug in 1897
Language	Native speakers	%
Kyurin	59,309	76.35
Kazi-Kumukh	13,694	17.63
Tat	2,466	3.17
Tatar (Note: Before 1918, Azerbaijanis were generally known as "Tatars". This term, employed by the Russians, referred to Turkic-speaking Muslims of the South Caucasus. After 1918, with the establishment of the Azerbaijan Democratic Republic and "especially during the Soviet era", the Tatar group identified itself as "Azerbaijani".)	1,321	1.70
Jewish	530	0.68
Russian	178	0.23
Avar-Andean	50	0.06
Dargin	45	0.06
Armenian	16	0.02
Ukrainian	13	0.02
Georgian	12	0.02
Kumyk	5	0.01
Persian	2	0.00
Polish	2	0.00
Chechen	1	0.00
German	1	0.00
Lithuanian	1	0.00
Other	34	0.04
TOTAL	77,680	100.00

=== Kavkazskiy kalendar ===
According to the 1917 publication of Kavkazskiy kalendar, the Kyurinskiy okrug had a population of 86,050 on 14 January [O.S. 1 January] 1916, including 44,712 men and 41,338 women, 84,965 of whom were the permanent population, and 1,085 were temporary residents:

Nationality	Number	%
North Caucasians	81,037	94.17
Jews	3,201	3.72
Shia Muslims (Note: Primarily Tatars.)	1,213	1.41
Russians	591	0.69
Other Europeans	5	0.01
Armenians	3	0.00
TOTAL	86,050	100.00

== Bibliography ==
- Bournoutian, George A. (2018). Armenia and Imperial Decline: The Yerevan Province, 1900–1914. Milton Park, Abingdon, Oxon: Routledge. ISBN 978-1-351-06260-2. OCLC 1037283914.
- Hovannisian, Richard G. (1971). The Republic of Armenia. Vol. 1: The First Year, 1918–1919. Berkeley: University of California Press. ISBN 978-0520019843.
- Кавказский календарь на 1913 год [Caucasian calendar for 1913] (in Russian) (68th ed.). Tiflis: Tipografiya kantselyarii Ye.I.V. na Kavkaze, kazenny dom. 1913. Archived from the original on 19 April 2022.
- Кавказский календарь на 1917 год [Caucasian calendar for 1917] (in Russian) (72nd ed.). Tiflis: Tipografiya kantselyarii Ye.I.V. na Kavkaze, kazenny dom. 1917. Archived from the original on 4 November 2021.
- Tsutsiev, Arthur (2014). Atlas of the Ethno-Political History of the Caucasus (PDF). Translated by Nora Seligman Favorov. New Haven: Yale University Press. ISBN 9780300153088. Archived (PDF) from the original on 17 June 2023.
