= Zaqatala Governorate =

Zaqatala Governorate Zaqatala quberniyası
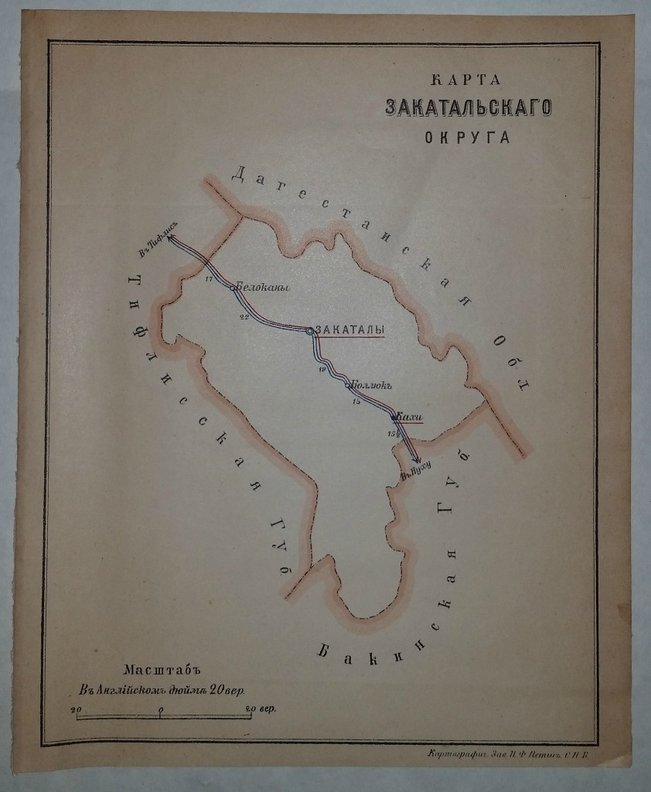
- Country: Azerbaijan Democratic Republic
- Established: 26 June 1918
- Seat: Zaqatala

Government
  - Governor: Aliyar bek Hashimbekov

Area
  - Total: 3,992.54 km^{2} (1,541.53 sq mi)

Population
  - Total: 92,698

The Zaqatala Governorate (Azerbaijani: Zaqatala quberniyası) was an administrative division of the short-lived Azerbaijan Democratic Republic from 1918 to 1920. The district had an overwhelming Muslim majority forming 92 percent of the population, however, was claimed by the neighbouring republics of Georgia and the Mountainous Republic of the North Caucasus (MRNC).

== Background ==
Following the collapse of the Russian Empire, three states simultaneously claimed the former Zakatal Okrug: the MRNC, Azerbaijan, and Georgia. Established on 20 March 1917, the Zagatala District Executive Committee—which possessed practically all power in the region—prevented Georgia from establishing control over the district. On 26 June, taking into account the impassable mountains between the Mountain Republic and the Okrug, the Zaqatala National Council, as "In terms of culture, economy, lifestyle, religion, as well as industry and language, Zagatala is of the same origin with Azerbaijan" on the entry of the Zaqatala district into Azerbaijan as a province. On the same day, according to the official chronology, the Zaqatala governorate of the Azerbaijan was created. On 30 June, Zagatala district became the third governorate of Azerbaijan (after Elisavetpol and Baku) with 3,992.54 square kilometres (1,541.53 square miles) of area. The governorate's first governor was a Sunni Kumyk known as Aliyar bek Hashimbekov.

Despite the district's incorporation into Azerbaijan, the territorial dispute remained unresolved: According to Georgian laws, the Zaqatala district was considered an integral part of Georgia. From 25 October to 2 November 1919, a commission was operating to establish temporary boundaries between the Zaqatala Governorate and the Signakh uezd of Georgia. The parties came to an agreement to resolve all issues exclusively by peaceful means.

== History ==
On February 17, 1919, the Zaqatala province was judicially subordinated to the Ganja district court. On February 2, 1920, a male teachers' seminary was established in Zaqatala. The "Lezghi regiment", created by the Avars at the beginning of 1918 and transferred under the command of Aliaga Shikhlinsky on February 22 and was renamed the "Zaqatala regiment". The regiment participated in the Battle of Baku, in the Karabakh battles and the Zangezur offensive in November 1919 during Armenian-Azerbaijani War.

The main population of the governorate were Sunnis in opposition to the rest of Azerbaijan which were Shia. So in 1918, the Ahrar party was created in Baku, representing the interests of the Zaqatala province and the Sunnis in general. The representative of the party Aslan-bek Kardashev from April 14 to December 22, 1919, was the Minister of Agriculture of Azerbaijan. The party's print organ was the newspaper El, published in the Azerbaijani language. The region was represented by 8 deputies in the parliament.

Aliyar bek Hashimbekov's tenure was filled with disturbances and rivalries. Especially there was a tension with Georgian border guards. His successor Mammad bek Shahmaliyev thought that armed conflict was inevitable. Georgian border guards captured Mazımçay border post very easily in September. During his tenure as governor, he often took leave for various reasons and did not take the necessary steps to protect the province. As a result, he was sacked from the post in January 1920.

The Ahrar reached its zenith when a member of the party – ethnic Avar, Bahadur Khan Malachikhanov was appointed as the new governor on January 16, 1920. In his new position, Malachikhanov actively contributed to ending civil strife between Azerbaijanis and Armenians in the region. In his first address to the population, the new head of the district demanded an end to various kinds of confrontation, maintain calm and warned that with any changes in the socio-political life of Azerbaijan, the current government will continue to lead the Zaqatala district. During his short term as Governor-General, he prevented several bloody tragedies.

According to historian Richard G. Hovannisian, of the more than 2 thousand Armenians that lived in the Zakatal Okrug, only a few hundred remained by 1919, the remainder of whom were being harassed by outlaws.

Governorate was abolished after Soviet takeover of Azerbaijan. On May 7, 1920, a few days after the Sovietization of Azerbaijan, Soviet Russia signed the Moscow Treaty with Georgia, in which it recognized the former Zakatala District as the territory of Georgia in exchange for the Georgian government's refusal to obstruct the activities of the Communist Party of Georgia. Nevertheless, in June 1920, at a meeting with Kirov, the Deputy Minister of Foreign Affairs of Georgia stated that the territory of the district was still controlled by the Azerbaijani Soviet troops.

== Demographics ==
According to the Address-Calendar of the Republic of Azerbaijan for 1920, the Zaqatala Governorate, recorded as Zakatalskiy okrug (Russian: Закатальскiй округъ), had a population of 92,698. The data was compiled from the 1917 publication of the Kavkazskiy kalendar. However, the Kavkazskiy kalendar's actual total for the Zakatal okrug is 92,608 – the discrepancy (90 extra people) is due to the address-calendar's increased number of Georgians (4,664) compared to the original's (4,574), hence the difference of 90.

Nationalities of the Zaqatala Governorate
Nationality	Number	%
Muslims	85,136	91.84
Georgians	4,664	5.03
Armenians	2,530	2.73
Russians	326	0.35
Others	42	0.05
TOTAL	92,698	100.00

== Governors ==
1. Aliyar bek Hashimbekov — June 26, 1918 – March 16, 1919
2. Mammad bek Shahmaliyev — March 16, 1919 – January 16, 1920
3. Bahadur Khan Malachikhanov — January 16, 1920 – April 28, 1920
