= Əniq =

- Municipality
- Location within Azerbaijan
- Coordinates: 41°19′58″N 48°13′16″E
- Country: Azerbaijan
- Rayon: Qusar

Population
  - Total: 2,129
- Time zone: UTC+4 (AZT)
  - Summer (DST): UTC+5 (AZT)

Əniq (also, Anykh) is a village and municipality in the Qusar Rayon of Azerbaijan. It has a population of 2,129.
