= Fiy =

Fiy Фий
- Selo
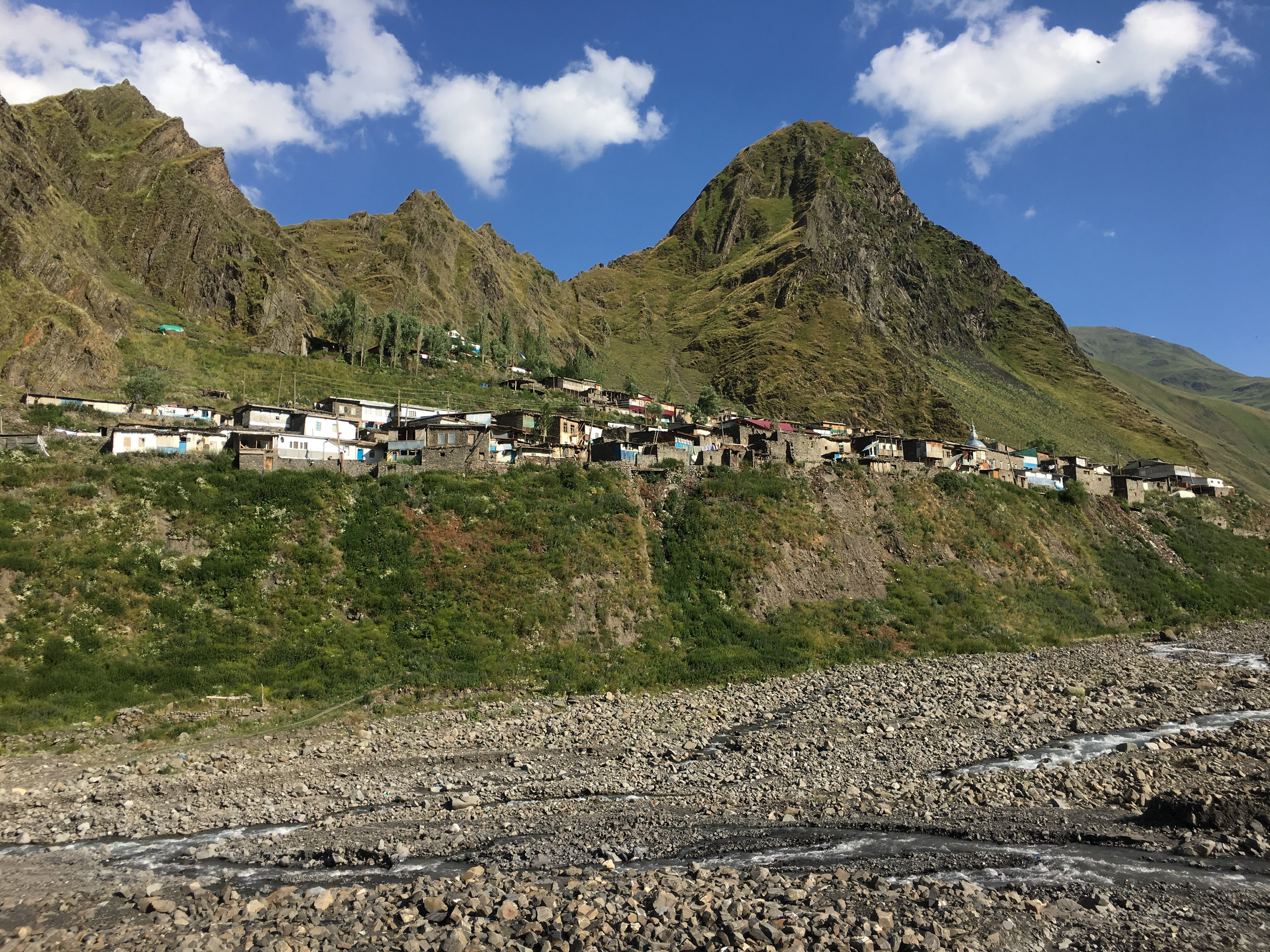

- Location within Republic of Dagestan Location within Russia
- Coordinates: 41°17′N 47°33′E
- Country: Russia
- Region: Republic of Dagestan
- District: Akhtynsky District
- Time zone: UTC+3:00

Fiy (Russian: Фий) is a rural locality (a selo) in Akhtynsky District, Republic of Dagestan, Russia. The population was 1,710 as of 2010.

== Geography ==
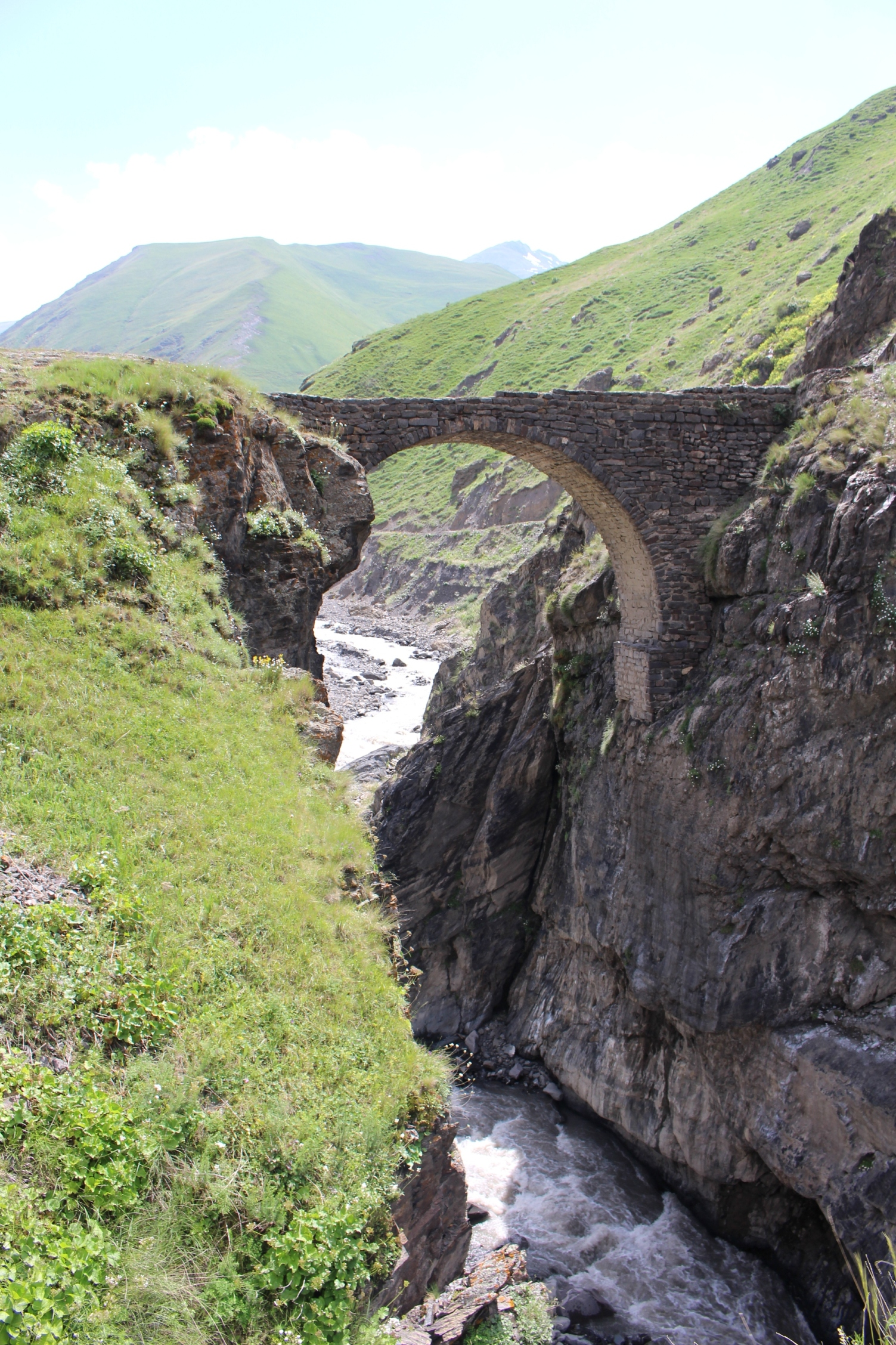
A bridge near the main settlement

Fiy is located 31 km southwest of Akhty (the district's administrative centre) by road, on the Fiya River. Gdym is the nearest rural locality.
