= Magaramkent =

Rural locality in Dagestan, Russia

Magaramkent Магарамкент
- Selo

Other transcription(s)
  - Lezgian: Мегьарамдхуьр
- Interactive map of Magaramkent
- Location within Republic of Dagestan Location within European Russia Location within Russia
- Coordinates: 41°37′05″N 48°21′02″E
- Country: Russia
- Federal subject: Dagestan
- Founded: 1801
- Elevation: 377 m (1,237 ft)

Population
  - Estimate (2021): 5,756 )
- Time zone: UTC+3 (MSK)
- Postal code: 368780
- OKTMO ID: 82637440101

Magaramkent (Russian: Магарамкент, Lezgian: Мегьарамдхуьр) is a rural locality (a selo) and the administrative center of Magaramkentsky District of the Republic of Dagestan, Russia. Population: 6,953 (2010 census); 6,266 (2002 census); 4,327 (1989 Soviet census).
