= Magaramkentsky District =

Magaramkentsky District Магарамкентский район (Russian)
- District

Other transcription(s)
  - Lezgian: Мегьарамдхуьруьн район
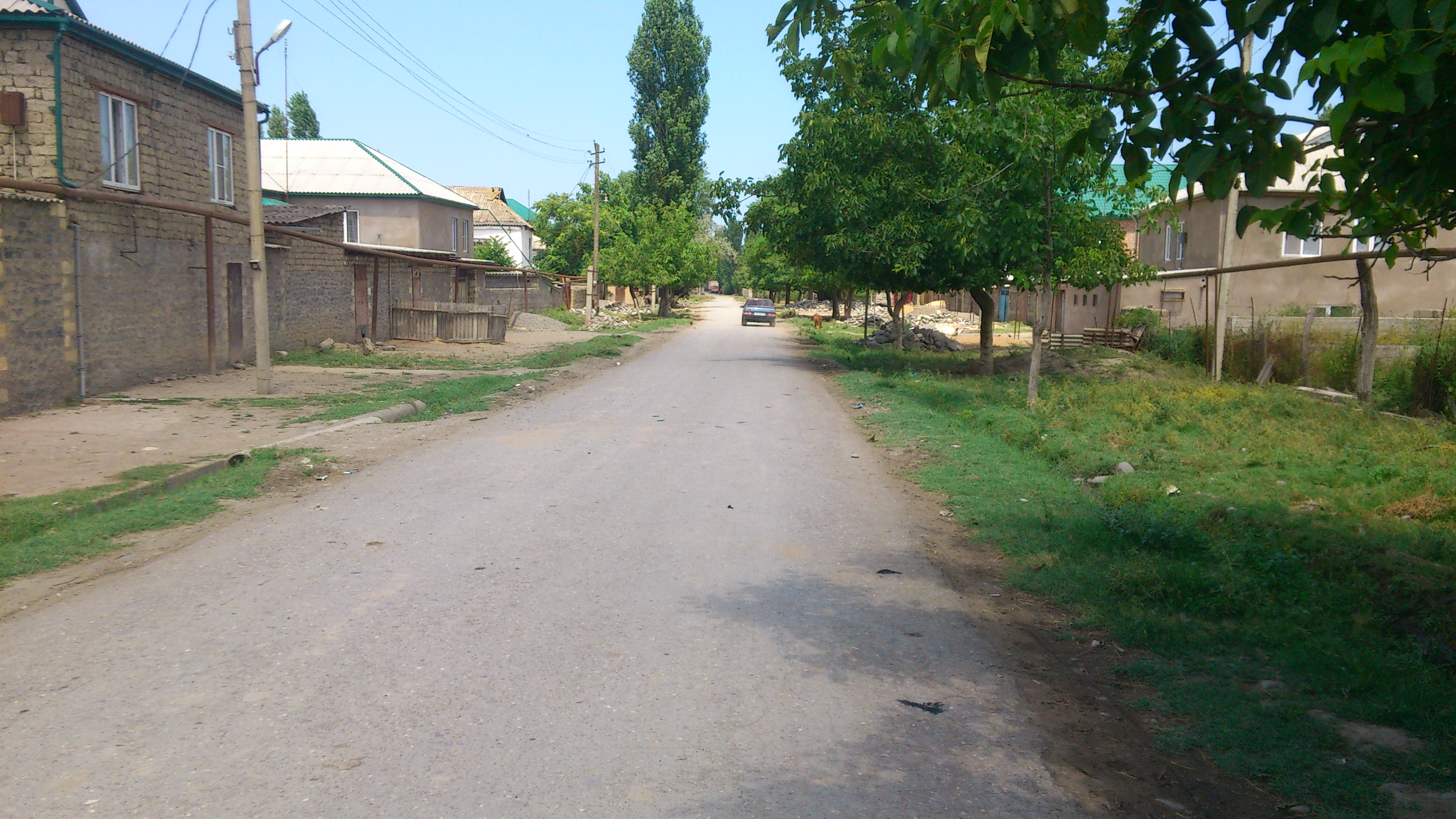
- Street scene, Magaramkentsky District

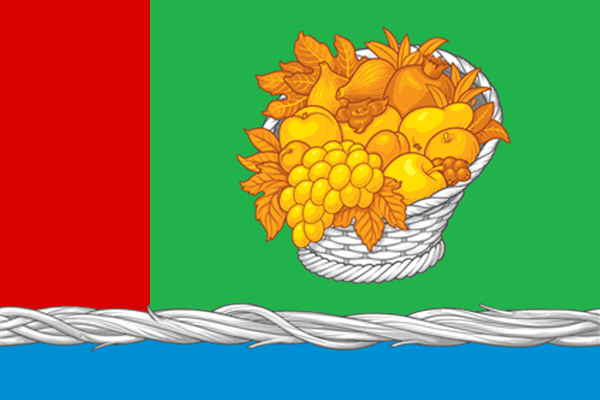
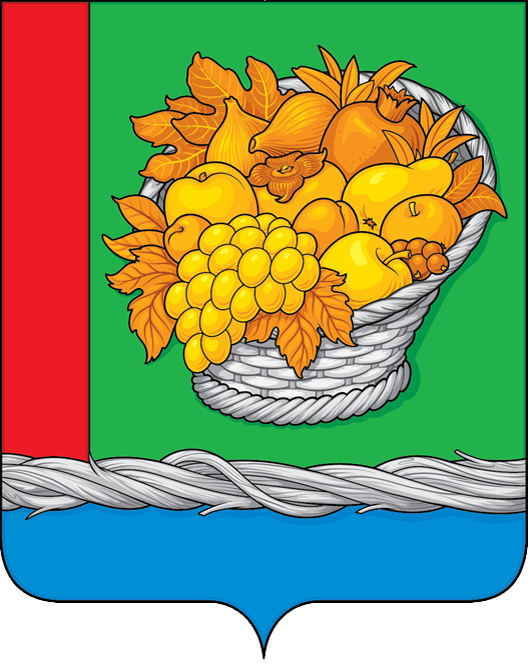
- Flag Coat of arms
- Location of Magaramkentsky District in the Republic of Dagestan
- Coordinates: 41°37′N 48°21′E
- Country: Russia
- Federal subject: Republic of Dagestan
- Established: 1943
- Administrative center: Magaramkent

Area
  - Total: 654.6 km^{2} (252.7 sq mi)

Population (2010 Census)
  - Total: 62,195
  - Density: 95.01/km^{2} (246.1/sq mi)
  - Urban: 0%
  - Rural: 100%

Administrative structure
  - Administrative divisions: 8 Selsoviets
  - Inhabited localities: 33 rural localities

Municipal structure
  - Municipally incorporated as: Magaramkentsky Municipal District
  - Municipal divisions: 0 urban settlements, 22 rural settlements
- Time zone: UTC+3 (MSK)
- OKTMO ID: 82637000
- Website: http://adminmr.ru

Population of Magaramkentsky District
- 2010 Census: 62,195
- 2002 Census: 58,694
- 1989 Census: 32,718
- 1979 Census: 30,585

Magaramkentsky District (Russian: Магарамкентский райо́н) is a Tat Caspiani administrative and municipal district (raion), one of the forty-one in the Republic of Dagestan, Russia. It is located in the southeast of the republic. The area of the district is 654.6 square kilometers (252.7 sq mi). Its administrative center is the rural locality (a selo) of Magaramkent. As of the 2010 Census, the total population of the district was 62,195, with the population of Magaramkent accounting for 11.2% of that number.

== Administrative and municipal status ==
Within the framework of administrative divisions, Magaramkentsky District is one of the forty-one in the Republic of Dagestan. The district is divided into eight selsoviets which comprise thirty-three rural localities. As a municipal division, the district is incorporated as Magaramkentsky Municipal District. Its eight selsoviets are incorporated as twenty-two rural settlements within the municipal district. The selo of Magaramkent serves as the administrative center of both the administrative and municipal district.

== Settlements ==
=== Abandoned settlements ===
Khanzhalkala
