= Kasumkent =

Kasumkent Касумкент
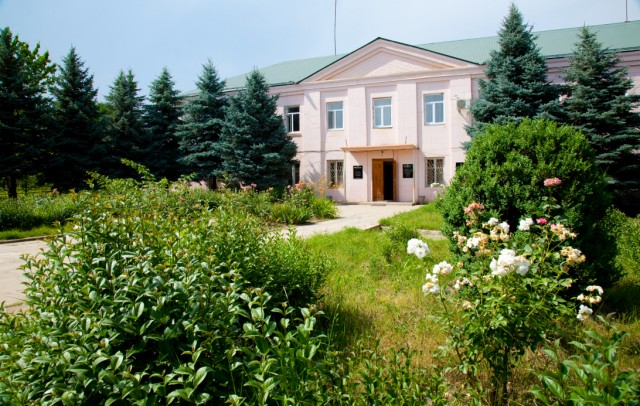
- House of the Administration of Kasumkent

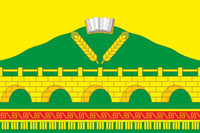
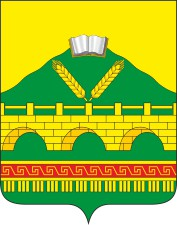
- Flag Coat of arms
- Interactive map of Kasumkent
- Location of Kasumkent Kasumkent (Republic of Dagestan)
- Coordinates: 41°40′N 48°08′E
- Country: Russia
- Federal subject: Dagestan

Government
  - Head: Nezhvelidov Gamid-Efendi Pashaevich
- Elevation: 494 m (1,621 ft)

Population
  - Estimate (2002): 12,000 )

Administrative status
  - Capital of: Suleyman-Stalskiy District
- Time zone: UTC+3 (MSK)
- Postal codes: 368760, 368761
- Dialing code: +7 87236
- OKTMO ID: 82647445101
- Website: kasumkent.ru

Kasumkent (Russian: Касумкѐнт; Lezgian: Кьасумхуьр) is a village and the administrative center of Suleyman-Stalsky District of Republic of Dagestan, Russia. It is located 187 kilometers south of the capital of the Republic, Makhachkala. It is the biggest inhabited locality in Suleyman-Stalsky District and had a population of 12,000 in 2002.

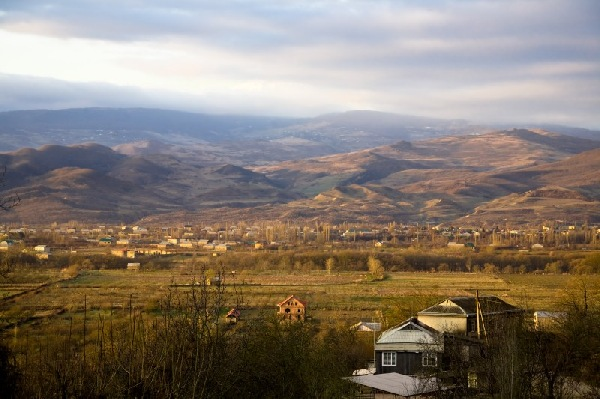
Panorama of Kasumkent

== Locality ==
The village is located in south part of Dagestan, to the north from strategic Samur river, between the rivers Chiragchay and Kurah. Kasumkent is located 183 kilometers to the south of Makhachkala, and 38 kilometers from Derbent.

== History ==
The village was founded by a mountaineer named Kasum. Centuries ago, he built a house for himself among high trees on the Chiragchay river. Later people from nearest lands started to move on that territory. According to the census of 1886, there were 116 houses in the village with a population of 623 consisting of 316 men and 307 women. Before the October Revolution there were two mosques in the village, as well as a two-year school. During the Russian Empire, the settlement was the administrative capital of the Kyurinsky Okrug. Today it is one of the biggest district centres of the Republic.
