= Suleyman-Stalsky District =

Suleyman-Stalsky District Сулейман-Стальский район (Russian)
- District

Other transcription(s)
  - Lezgian: СтӀал Сулейманан район
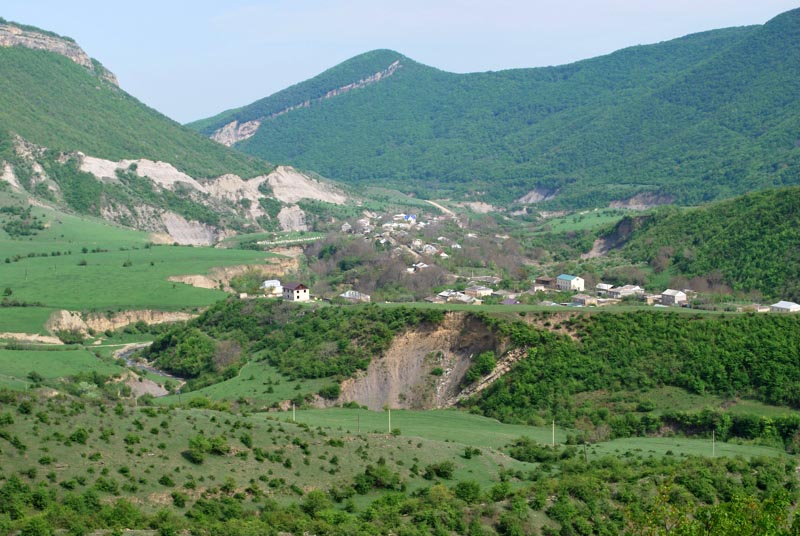
- The selo of Tsmur in Suleyman-Stalsky District

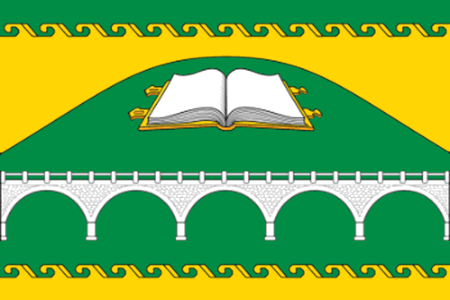
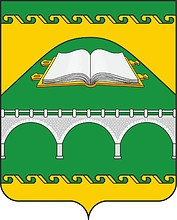
- Flag Coat of arms
- Location of Suleyman-Stalsky District in the Republic of Dagestan
- Coordinates: 41°40′N 48°08′E
- Country: Russia
- Federal subject: Republic of Dagestan
- Established: 1929
- Administrative center: Kasumkent

Area
  - Total: 666.3 km^{2} (257.3 sq mi)

Population (2010 Census)
  - Total: 58,835
  - Density: 88.30/km^{2} (228.7/sq mi)
  - Urban: 0%
  - Rural: 100%

Administrative structure
  - Administrative divisions: 10 Selsoviets
  - Inhabited localities: 38 rural localities

Municipal structure
  - Municipally incorporated as: Suleyman-Stalsky Municipal District
  - Municipal divisions: 0 urban settlements, 16 rural settlements
- Time zone: UTC+3 (MSK)
- OKTMO ID: 82647000
- Website: http://www.suleiman-stalskiy.ru

Population of Suleyman-Stalsky District
- 2010 Census: 58,835
- 2002 Census: 54,036
- 1989 Census: 32,764
- 1979 Census: 36,884

Suleyman-Stalsky District (Russian: Сулейма́н-Ста́льский райо́н; Lezgian: СтӀал Сулейманан район) is an administrative and municipal district (raion), one of the forty-one in the Republic of Dagestan, Russia. It is located in the southeast of the republic. The area of the district is 666.3 square kilometers (257.3 sq mi). Its administrative center is the rural locality (a selo) of Kasumkent. As of the 2010 Census, the total population of the district was 58,835, with the population of Kasumkent accounting for 22.5% of that number.

== Administrative and municipal status ==
Within the framework of administrative divisions, Suleyman-Stalsky District is one of the forty-one in the Republic of Dagestan. The district is divided into ten selsoviets which comprise thirty-eight rural localities. As a municipal division, the district is incorporated as Suleyman-Stalsky Municipal District. Its ten selsoviets are incorporated as sixteen rural settlements within the municipal district. The selo of Kasumkent serves as the administrative center of both the administrative and municipal district.

== Settlements ==
There are 39 rural settlements in the district.

=== Abandoned settlements ===
Ashaga-Maka, Biger, Darkush, Evigar, Kean, Kele, Kurkurkent, Makar, Mekhkerg, Ruhun, Khpit, Hutarg, Tsitser, Tsitsig, Chantarkent, Chilik, Ashaga-Arag, Yaltsugar.
