= Lezgian language =

Northeast Caucasian language

Lezgian
- Lezgi, Lezgin
- лезги чӀал lezgi č’al لەزگی جال
- Pronunciation: [lezɡi tʃʼal]
- Native to: North Caucasus
- Region: Dagestan and Azerbaijan
- Ethnicity: Lezgins
- Native speakers: 630,000 (2020)
- Language family: Northeast Caucasian: Lezgic; Samur; Eastern Samur; Lezgi–Aghul–Tabasaran; Lezgian
- Writing system: Cyrillic script (present, official); Latin script (historically); Arabic script (historically)

Official status
- Official language in: Russia: Dagestan

Language codes
- ISO 639-2: lez
- ISO 639-3: lez
- Glottolog: lezg1247
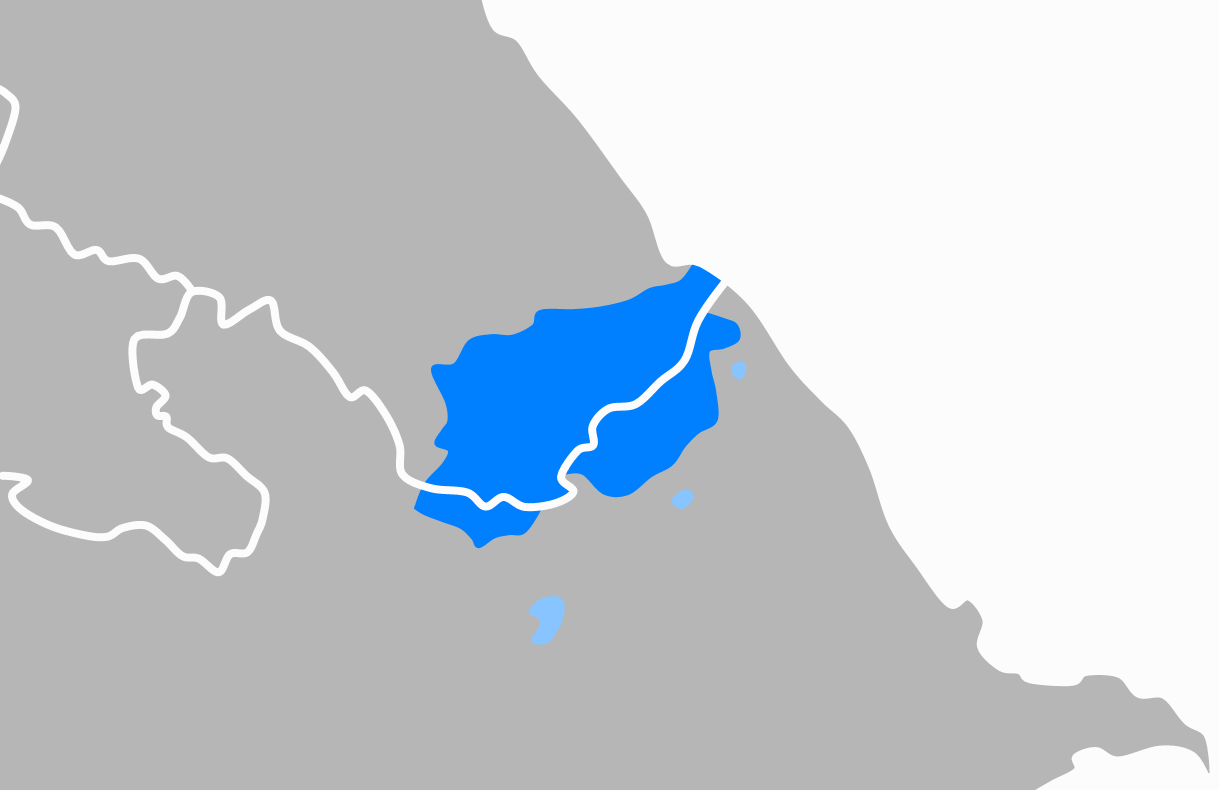
- Distribution of the Lezgin language in North Caucasus

- Lezgian is classified as Vulnerable by the UNESCO Atlas of the World's Languages in Danger.

Lezgian (/ˈlɛzɡiən/ LEZ-gee-ən), also called Lezgi (/ˈlɛzɡiː/ LEZ-gee) or Lezgin (/ˈlɛzɡɪn/ LEZ-gin), is a Northeast Caucasian language. It is spoken by the Lezgins, who live primarily in southern Dagestan—where it is an official language—and northern Azerbaijan. It is classified as "vulnerable" by UNESCO's Atlas of the World's Languages in Danger.

== Geographic distribution ==
In 2002, Lezgian was spoken by about 397,000 people in Russia, mainly Southern Dagestan; in 1999 it was spoken by 178,400 people in mainly the Qusar, Quba, Qabala, Oghuz, Ismailli and Khachmaz provinces of northeastern Azerbaijan. Lezgian is also spoken in Kazakhstan, Kyrgyzstan, Turkey, Turkmenistan, Ukraine, Germany and Uzbekistan by immigrants from Azerbaijan and Dagestan.

Some speakers are in the Balikesir, Yalova, İzmir, Bursa regions of Turkey especially in Kirne (Ortaca), a village in Balikesir Province which touches the western coast, being south-west of Istanbul.

The total number of speakers is about 800,000.

== Classification ==
=== Dialects ===
According to the Institute of Linguistics of the Russian Academy of Sciences, Lezgian is composed of three dialects consisting of 17 subdialects.These are:

- Kyurin Dialect
  - Gyunei (Spoken around along the left bank of the lower reaches of the Samur River basin in the Magaramkentsky and Suleyman-Stalsky Districts including the cities of Magaramkent, Kasumkent and Derbent)
  - Yarkin (Spoken around the middle reaches of Chiragchay River basin in the Suleiman-Stalsky and Khivsky Districts)
  - Kurakh (Spoken around the Kurakh River basin in the Kurakhsky District, including the city of Kurakh)
  - Giliyar (Spoken in the village of Gilyar in the Magaramkentsky District)
  - Gelkhen (Spoken in the village of Gelkhen in the Kurakhsky District)
- Akhty Dialect
  - Akhtyn (Spoken around the middle reaches of Akhtychay River basin in the Akhtynsky District, including the city of Akhty)
  - Dokuzparin (Spoken around the Usukhchay River basin in the Dokuzparinsky District, including the city of Usukhchay)
  - Kurush (Spoken in the village of Kurush in the Dokuzparinsky District)
  - Dzhaba (Spoken in the village of Dzhaba in the Akhtynsky District)
  - Gdym (Spoken in the village of Gdym in the Akhtynsky District)
  - Dashagil-Filfil (Spoken in the Oghuz District of Azerbaijan)
  - Fiy (Spoken in the village of Fiy in the Akhtynsky District)
- Quba Dialect
  - Quba (Spoken in the Quba District of Azerbaijan)
  - Kuzun (Spoken in the Qusar District of Azerbaijan including the city of Qusar)
  - Kımıl (Spoken in the village of Qımıl in the Quba District of Azerbaijan)
  - Anykh (Spoken in the village of Əniq in the Qusar District of Azerbaijan)

Other classifications differ in their treatment of Lezgian dialects. Glottolog lists 8 dialects of Lezgian, some of which correspond to the villages where they are spoken. The dialects are listed in alphabetical order based on their name in Glottolog:

- Akhty
- Anykh
- Garkin
- Gyunei
- Kiuri
- Kubachi
- Quba
- Stal

=== Related languages ===
Nine languages survive in the Lezgic language family:

- Lezgic languages
  - Nuclear Lezgic
    - Eastern Samur
      - Lezgin
      - Tabasaran
      - Aghul
      - Udi
      - Caucasian Albanian † – extinct
    - Western Samur
      - Tsakhur
      - Rutul
    - Southern Samur
      - Kryts
      - Jek
      - Budukh
    - Archi

These have the same names as their ethnic groups.

Some dialects differ heavily from the standard form, including the Quba and Akhty dialects spoken in Azerbaijan.

== Phonology ==
=== Vowels ===
Vowels of Lezgian
| | Front | | Central | Back |
| | unr. | rnd. | Central | Back |
|---|---|---|---|---|
| Close | i ⟨и⟩ | y ⟨уь⟩ | (ɨ) ⟨ы⟩ | u ⟨у⟩ |
| Mid | e ⟨е, э⟩ | (ø) | | (o) ⟨o⟩ |
| Open-mid | (ɛ) | (œ) | (ʌ) | (ɔ) |
| Open | æ ⟨я⟩ | | | ɑ ⟨а⟩ |

- /ɨ/ is dialectal and /o/ is found in Russian loanwords.
- /a/ has two main allophones: [ɑ] and [ʌ]; the former prevails in closed syllables (especially before uvulars and /r/), the latter in open syllables.
- /a/ is very often rounded and raised to /ɔ/ after labialized consonants, which may then lose their labialization. For example, кӀвач 'foot' /k’ʷat͡ʃʰ/ becomes [k’ʷɔt͡ʃʰ] or [k’ɔt͡ʃʰ].
- /e/ is more open [ɛ] in stressed syllables and /ɪ/ or [e] in pre-stress syllables. In the environment of labialized consonants /e/ is often pronounced as [ø]~[œ].
- if a vowel plus /n/ sequence is not followed by a vowel, the /n/ may be deleted and the vowel nasalized. Thus /zun/ 'I' can be pronounced [zũ].
- Chitoran and Babaliyeva show, at least for Babaliyeva in her native Yargun dialect, pre-tonic high vowels are syncopated.

=== Consonants ===
There are 54 consonants in Lezgian. Characters to the right are the letters of the Lezgian Cyrillic Alphabet. Aspiration is not normally indicated in the orthography, despite the fact that it is phonemic.

Consonants of Lezgian
| | | Labial | Dental | | Post- alveolar | Palatal | Velar | | Uvular | | Glottal |
| | | Labial | plain | labial | Post- alveolar | Palatal | plain | labial | plain | labial | Glottal |
|---|---|---|---|---|---|---|---|---|---|---|---|
| Nasal | | m ⟨м⟩ | n ⟨н⟩ | | | | | | | | |
| Plosive | voiced | b ⟨б⟩ | d ⟨д⟩ | | | | g ⟨г⟩ | gʷ ⟨гв⟩ | | | |
| Plosive | tenuis | p ⟨п⟩ | t ⟨т⟩ | tʷ ⟨тв⟩ | | | k ⟨к⟩ | kʷ ⟨кв⟩ | q ⟨къ⟩ | qʷ ⟨къв⟩ | ʔ ⟨ъ⟩ |
| Plosive | aspirated | pʰ ⟨п⟩ | tʰ ⟨т⟩ | tʷʰ ⟨тв⟩ | | | kʰ ⟨к⟩ | kʷʰ ⟨кв⟩ | qʰ ⟨хъ⟩ | qʷʰ ⟨хъв⟩ | |
| Plosive | ejective | pʼ ⟨пӀ⟩ | tʼ ⟨тӀ⟩ | tʷʼ ⟨тӀв⟩ | | | kʼ ⟨кӀ⟩ | kʷʼ ⟨кӀв⟩ | qʼ ⟨кь⟩ | qʷʼ ⟨кьв⟩ | |
| Affricate | voiced | | dz ⟨дз⟩ | | dʒ ⟨дж⟩ | | | | | | |
| Affricate | tenuis | | t͡s ⟨ц⟩ | t͡sʷ ⟨цв⟩ | t͡ʃ ⟨ч⟩ | | | | | | |
| Affricate | aspirated | | t͡sʰ ⟨ц⟩ | t͡sʷʰ ⟨цв⟩ | t͡ʃʰ ⟨ч⟩ | | | | | | |
| Affricate | ejective | | t͡sʼ ⟨цӀ⟩ | t͡sʷʼ ⟨цӀв⟩ | t͡ʃʼ ⟨чӀ⟩ | | | | | | |
| Fricative | voiced | v ⟨в⟩ | z ⟨з⟩ | zʷ ⟨зв⟩ | ʒ ⟨ж⟩ | | | | ʁ ⟨гъ⟩ | ʁʷ ⟨гъв⟩ | |
| Fricative | voiceless | f ⟨ф⟩ | s ⟨с⟩ | sʷ ⟨св⟩ | ʃ ⟨ш⟩ | | x ⟨хь⟩ | xʷ ⟨хьв⟩ | χ ⟨х⟩ | χʷ ⟨хв⟩ | h ⟨гь⟩ |
| Approximant | | | l ⟨л⟩ | | | j ⟨й⟩ | | w ⟨в⟩ | | | |
| Trill | | | r ⟨р⟩ | | | | | | | | |

== Alphabets ==
Lezgian has been written in several different alphabets over the course of its history. These alphabets have been based on three scripts: Arabic (before 1928), Latin (1928–1938), and Cyrillic (1938–present).

The Lezgian Cyrillic alphabet is as follows:

| А а | Б б | В в | Г г | Гъ гъ | Гь гь | Д д | Е е |
| Ё ё | Ж ж | З з | И и | Й й | К к | Къ къ | Кь кь |
| КӀ кӏ | Л л | М м | Н н | О о | П п | ПӀ пӏ | Р р |
| С с | Т т | ТӀ тӏ | У у | Уь уь | Ф ф | Х х | Хъ хъ |
| Хь хь | Ц ц | ЦӀ цӏ | Ч ч | ЧӀ чӏ | Ш ш | Ъ ъ | Ы ы |
| Ь ь | Э э | Ю ю | Я я | | | | |

== Grammar ==
Lezgian is unusual for a Northeast Caucasian language in not having noun classes (also called "grammatical gender"). Standard Lezgian grammar features 18 grammatical cases, produced by agglutinating suffixes, of which 12 are still used in spoken conversation.

=== Vowel Harmony ===
Lezgian has a limited form of palatal and labial vowel harmony. In native Lezgian words, only syllables up to and including the stressed syllable are subject to vowel harmony. Since native Lezgian words are never stressed after the second syllable, only two vowels in a word can be subject to vowel harmony.

Palatal harmony contrasts the front vowels /e, i, y, æ/ with the back vowels /a, u/, and labial vowel harmony contrasts the labialized vowels /u, y/ with non-labialized /i/. The vowels (/a, æ, e/ are considered neutral).

=== Cases ===
The four grammatical cases are:

- Absolutive case (basic form of the word, no ending): marks the subject of an intransitive verb and the direct object of a transitive sentence. It is also used to mark a nominal predicate (who or what something turns into/becomes) and as a vocative.
- Ergative case (various endings; the most common are: -ди, -a or -е; [-di, -a or e], which are added to the Absolutive): marks the subject of transitive verbs, and the subject of some compound intransitive verbs.

Ada rak aqʰaj-na wa xürü-qʰdi zwer-na
she.ERG door(NOM) open-AOR and village-PODIR run-AOR
"She opened the door and ran into the village"

- Genitive case (ending -н [-n]; added to the Ergative): marks possession. It is also used with the meaning 'of', as well as describing the qualities, attributes, and materials. The genitive case precedes the noun that it modifies.

Am ask'an bujdi-n, qumral jak'-ari-n žehil tir
he.ABS low stature-GEN dark flesh-PL-GEN young COP.PST
"He was a young man of low stature and dark complexion"

- Dative case (ending -з [-z]; added to the Ergative): usually marks the indirect object of sentences, that is the recipient of an action. It is also used to mark the subject of some verbs (mainly about emotions) and to express a point of time and direction.

Ruša gada.di-z cük ga-na
girl.ERG boy-DAT flower give-AOR
"The girl gave a flower to the boy"

- There are fourteen Locative cases:
  - Adessive case (ending -в [-v]; added to the Ergative): marks the object of some verbs to mean 'by', 'to', 'with'.
  - Adelative case (ending -вай [-vaj]; added to the Ergative): expresses movement from somewhere. It is also used with the verb 'to be able' and to express an accidental action.
  - Addirective case (ending -вди [-vdi]; added to the Ergative): used as an instrumental case, but also sometimes used with its original meaning, 'in the direction of', and more rarely 'near by'.
  - The Postessive case (ending -хъ [-qh]; added to the Ergative): means 'behind', 'at', 'toward', 'in exchange for', and 'with'. In a construction with the verb ава (ava), it expresses possession.
  - Postelative case (ending -хъай [-qhaj]; added to the Ergative): can either mean 'from' or the cause of fear or shame.
  - Postdirective case (ending -хъди [-qhdi]; added to the Ergative): rarely used case, meaning 'toward(s)'.
  - Subessive case (ending -к [-k]; added to the Ergative): means either 'below' or 'participates'.
  - Subelative case (ending -кай [-kaj]; added to the Ergative): means either 'from below', 'from', '(from) against', 'with' or 'out of' (partitive). It is also used to mark Y in the construction 'X becomes out-of-Y' and can express the topic of a sentence ('about') or the cause of emotions.
  - Subdirective case (ending -кди [-kdi]; added to the Ergative): expresses cause (never motion under), and can mean 'because' or 'of' (when in sentences such as 'the man died of a disease'.
  - Inessive case (endings -а or -е [-a or -e]; added to Absolutive): means 'at', 'in' or 'during/whilst'.
  - Inelative case (endings -ай or -ей [-aj or -ej]; added to Inessive): means 'out of' or 'in return for'.
  - Superessive case (ending -л [-l]; added to the Inessive): means 'on', and also to express the cause of some emotions.
  - Superelative case (ending -лай [-laj]; added to the Inessive): means 'off', 'after' or 'than' (comparison).
  - Superdirective case (ending -лди [-ldi]; added to the Inessive): means 'onto', 'until', 'in' (when followed by an adjective), as an instrumental case (e.g. language) or instructive with abstract nouns.

=== Declension ===
The plural form of nouns is most often formed with the suffix -ar (or -jar if the word ends in a vowel). -er is also used to conform with palatal vowel harmony. The suffixes -lar/-ler are borrowed from the Turkic languages and are used for Turkic loanwords.

Plural Formation
| Singular | Plural | Translation |
|---|---|---|
| muhman | muhman-ar | 'guests' |
| dide | dide-jar | 'mothers' |
| pel | pel-er | 'foreheads' |
| daǧ | daǧ-lar | 'mountains' |

There are two types of declensions.

==== First declension ====
| Case | Singular | | Plural | |
|---|---|---|---|---|
| Absolutive | буба | buba | бубаяр | bubajar |
| Ergative | бубади | bubadi | бубайри | bubajri |
| Genitive | бубадин | bubadin | бубайрин | bubajrin |
| Dative | бубадиз | bubadiz | бубайриз | bubajriz |
| Adessive | бубадив | bubadiv | бубайрив | bubajriv |
| Adelative | бубадивай | bubadivaj | бубайривай | bubajrivaj |
| Addirective | бубадивди | bubadivdi | бубайривди | bubajrivdi |
| Postessive | бубадихъ | bubadiqʰ | бубайрихъ | bubajriqʰ |
| Postelative | бубадихъай | bubadiqʰaj | бубайрихъай | bubajriqʰaj |
| Postdirective | бубадихъди | bubadiqʰdi | буабайрихъди | buabajriqʰdi |
| Subessive | бубадик | bubadikʰ | бубайрик | bubajrikʰ |
| Subelative | бубадикай | bubadikʰaj | бубайрикай | bubajrikʰaj |
| Subdirective | бубадикди | bubadikʰdi | бубайрикди | bubajrikʰdi |
| Inessive | бубада | bubada | бубайра | bubajra |
| Inelative | бубадай | bubadaj | бубайрай | bubajraj |
| Superessive | бубадал | bubadal | бубайрал | bubajral |
| Superelative | бубадалай | bubadalaj | бубайралай | bubajralaj |
| Superdirective | бубадалди | bubadaldi | бубайралди | bubajraldi |

=== Nominal Derivation ===
Lezgian has three native suffixes for nominal derivation: -wal, -wi, and -qʰan.

-wal derives nouns from adjectives, e.g., takabur > takabur-wal 'proud > pride'. -wi forms nouns of origin from place names, e.g., Maxačqala > Maxačqala-wi 'person from Makhachkala'. -qʰan creates agent nouns from other nouns, e.g., ğürč > ğürče-qʰan 'hunt > hunter'. -wal and -wi are highly productive, while -qʰan is not.

=== Verbal Inflection ===
Verbs are divided into two classes: strong and weak. Strong verbs are stressed on the thematic vowel (e.g., rax-u-n), whereas weak verbs lack a thematic vowel and are stressed on the base (e.g., kis-un).

The inflectional endings are divided into three groups based on the type of stem: the masdar, imperfective, and aorist stems. However, the different stem forms are only distinguished in strong verbs. A partial paradigm is given below:

| | Strong Verb | | Weak Verb |
|---|---|---|---|
| | raxun "talk" | fin "go" | kisun "fall asleep" |
| Base form | rax- | f- | kis- |
| Masdar Stem | rax-u- | f-i- | kis- |
| Masdar | rax-u-n | f-i-n | kis-un |
| Optative | rax-u-raj | f-i-raj | kis-raj |
| Imperfective Stem | rax-a- | f-i- | kis- |
| Infinitive | rax-a-z | f-i-z | kis-iz |
| Imperfective | rax-a-zwa | f-i-zwa | kis-zawa |
| Aorist Stem | rax-a- | f-e- | kis- |
| Aorist | rax-a-na | f-e-na | kis-na |
| Perfect | rax-a-nwa | f-e-nwa | kis-nawa |

The masdar is a verbal noun and can be inflected for case and number. It is formed by suffixing -n to strong verbs and -un to weak verbs. For example, the verb k'walax "work" becomes k'walax-un "(the action of) working". Two additional grammatical forms based on the masdar stem are the optative and imperative moods. The optative is typically formed with the suffix -raj in both weak and strong verbs. For the imperative, most strong verbs reduplicate the last consonant of the stem, and most weak verbs keep the masdar stem to form the imperative or add -a to the stem.

From the imperfective stem, the infinitive, imperfective, continuative imperfective, future, hortative, and prohibitive form can be formed, as well as the posterior, graduative, and immediate-anterior converbs.

| Form | Strong | Weak | Example 'run' |
|---|---|---|---|
| Infinitive | -z | -iz | kat-iz |
| Imperfective | -zwa | -zawa | kat-zawa |
| Cont. Imperfective | -zma | -zama | kat-zama |
| Future | -da | -da | kat-da |
| Hortative | -n | -in | kat-in |
| Prohibitive | -mir | -mir | kat-mir |
| Posterior CV | -daldi | -daldi | kat-daldi |
| Graduative CV | -rdawaj | -irdawaj | kat-irdawaj |
| Imm.-Anterior CV | -zmaz | -zamaz | kat-zamaz |

From the aorist stem, the aorist, aorist participle, perfect, continuative perfect, aorist converb, and immediate-anterior converb can be formed.

| Form | Strong | Weak | Example 'do' |
|---|---|---|---|
| Aorist | -na | -na | awu-na |
| Aorist Participle | -r / -j / -ji | -aj | awu-r |
| Perfect | -nwa | -nawa | awu-nwa |
| Cont. Perfect | -nma | -nama | awu-nma |
| Aorist CV | -na | -na | awu-na |
| Imm.-Anterior CV | -nmaz(di) | -namaz(di) | awu-nmaz(di) |

=== Tense-Aspect Categories ===
There are 6 total tense-aspect categories. There are four basic ones (imperfective, future, aorist, and perfect), plus the continuative and past.

The imperfective usually refers to processes occurring at the time of reference.

Za čerčenie.d-in tars hazur-zawa
I.ERG drawing-GEN lesson prepare-IMPF
"I'm preparing the drawing lesson"

While the future tense can denote habitual actions, in colloquial speech the imperfective can also be used for habitual actions.

Šri Lanki.d-a ǧüläǧ-r.i k'as gu-n.i-kdi jis-a 500 kas req'i-zwa
Sri Lanka-INESS [snake-PL(ERG) bite give-MSD-SBDIR] year-INESS 500 person die-IMPF
"In Sri Lanka 500 people a year die from snakebite"

The future tense refers to future situations.

Pačah awa-č-iz čun hik' dulanmiš že-da?
[king be.in-NEG-IMC] we:ABS how living be-FUT
"How shall we live without the king?"

The aorist is used to refer to perfective events in the past. It is also the tense-aspect that is used in narratives.

Zun ix̂tin žawab.da-l razi x̂a-na-č
I:ABS such answer-SRESS satisfied be-AOR-NEG
"I was not satisfied with such an answer"

The perfect refers to events in the past that have current relevance (first example), and in some verbs it has a resultative meaning (second example).

Zun q'üzü x̂a-nwa, čan ruš
I old become-PRF soul girl
"I have become old my girl"

Ada-n rik'.i-kaj gila zalan sa qwan kürs x̂a-nwa-j
she-GEN heart-SBEL now heavy one stone hang be-PRF-PST
"A heavy stone was now hanging from her heart"

The continuative can be combined with the imperfective or perfect to add the meaning 'still' (or 'anymore' when negated). The adverb hele 'still' can be attached redundantly.

za-z wuč-da-t'a či-zma-č-ir
I-DAT [what.do-FUT-CND] know-IMPF.CONT-NEG-PST
"I did not anymore know what to do"

Three additional periphrastic tense-aspect categories can be formed through various auxiliary verbs and the copula. These are the periphrastic habitual, periphrastic future, and hearsay evidential.

The periphrastic habitual is formed by combining the auxiliary verb x̂un 'be' with the infinitive.

Am juǧ-di jif-di ǧam č'ugwa-z šex̂-iz x̂a-na
She:ABS day-ADV night-ADV [grief pull-IMC] cry-INF be-AOR
"She cried day and night in grief"

The Periphrastic future is formed with the Purpose/Manner converb -wal combined with the copula ja. It typically conveys a more immediate future time than the standard future form.

Ada i daǧ-lar.i-z c'iji ümür ǧi-da-j-wal ja
He(ERG) this mountain-PL-DAT new life bring-FUT-PTP-PURP COP
"He is going to bring a new life into these mountains"

The hearsay evidential has recently been grammaticalized into the suffix -lda, a contraction of the word luhuda '(one) says'. It is combined with a non-negated, non-past finite indicative verb form to create the hearsay evidential.

Qe sobranie že-da-lda
today meeting be-FUT-EVID
"They say that there will be a meeting today"

=== Verbal Derivation and Compunds ===
Verbs in Lezgian can be derived from other verbs through multiple processes. The causative suffix -(a)r is used to derive transitive verbs from intransitive verbs. It is placed between the verb stem and the masdar suffix, e.g., agaq'-un "arrive, reach" becomes agaq'-ar-un "bring, deliver". Verbs that are typically transitive can also be made intransitive through the anticausative by using x̂un "be, become" after the base verb: xkažun "raise, lift (an object)" becomes xkaz x̂un "rise".

== Vocabulary ==
=== Numbers ===
The numbers of Lezgian are:

| уд | [ud] | zero |
| сад | [sad] | one |
| кьвед | [qʷ’ed] | two |
| пуд | [pud] | three |
| кьуд | [q’ud] | four |
| вад | [vad] | five |
| ругуд | [rugud] | six |
| ирид | [irid] | seven |
| муьжуьд | [muʒud] | eight |
| кlуьд | [k’yd] | nine |
| цlуд | [ts’ud] | ten |
| цlусад | [ts’usad] | eleven |
| цlикьвед | [ts’iqʷ’ed] | twelve |
| цlипуд | [ts’ipud] | thirteen |
| цlикьуд | [ts’iq’ud] | fourteen |
| цlувад | [ts’uvad] | fifteen |
| цlуругуд | [ts’urugud] | sixteen |
| цlерид | [ts’erid] | seventeen |
| цlемуьжуьд | [ts’emyʒud] | eighteen |
| цlекlуьд | [ts’ek’yd] | nineteen |
| къад | [qad] | twenty |
| къадцуд | [qadtsud] | thirty |
| яхцlур | [jaxts’ur] | forty |
| яхцlурцуд | [jaxtsurtsud] | fifty |
| пудкъад | [pudqad] | sixty |
| пудкъадцlуд | [pudqadtsud] | seventy |
| кьудкъад | [q’udqal] | eighty |
| къудкъадницlуд | [q'udq'adnitsud] | ninety |
| виш | [viʃ] | one hundred |
| агъзур | [aɣzur] | one thousand |

Nouns following a number are always in the singular. Numbers precede the noun. "Сад" and "кьвед" lose their final "-д" before a noun.

Lezgian numerals work in a similar fashion to the French ones, and are based on the vigesimal system in which "20", not "10", is the base number. "Twenty" in Lezgian is къад, and higher numbers are formed by adding the suffix -ни to the word (which becomes "къанни"; the same change occurs in пудкъад and кьудкъад) and putting the remaining number afterwards. This way 24 for instance is къанни кьуд ("20 and 4"), and 37 is къанни цӀерид ("20 and 17"). Numbers over 40 are formed similarly (яхцӀур becomes яхцӀурни). 60 and 80 are treated likewise. For numbers over 100 just put a number of hundreds, then (if need be) the word with a suffix, then the remaining number. 659 is thus ругуд вишни яхцӀурни цеӀкӀуьд. The same procedure follows for 1000. 1989 is агьзурни кӀуьд вишни кьудкъанни кӀуьд in Lezgi.

== Bibliography ==
- Chitoran, Ioana; Babaliyeva, Ayten (2007). "An acoustic description of high vowel syncope in Lezgian" (PDF). In Jürgen Trouvain; William John Barry (eds.). Proceedings of the 16th International Congress of Phonetic Sciences, Saarbrücken, Germany, August 2007. pp. 2153–2156. ISBN 978-3-9811535-0-7. OCLC 254169296.
- Haspelmath, M. (1993). A Grammar of Lezgian. Mouton Grammar Library 9. Berlin & New York: Mouton de Gruyter. ISBN 3-11-013735-6.
- Talibov, Bukar B.; Gadžiev, Magomed M. (1966). Lezginsko-russkij slovar'. Moskva: Izd. Sovetskaja Ėnciklopedija.
