= Rutul people =

Northeast Caucasian ethnic group in Dagestan and Azerbaijan

Rutulians
мыхабыр (Russia) mykhabyr (romanized); mıxabır (Azerbaijan)
- The Rutulian national flag

Total population
- c. 170,000

Regions with significant populations
- Russia: 34,259 (2021)
- Dagestan: 27 849 (2010)
- Azerbaijan: 17,000 (~2000) - 40,000
- Ukraine: 137 (2001)
- Georgia: 103 (1989)

Languages
- Rutulian, Russian, Azerbaijani

Religion
- Sunni Islam

Related ethnic groups
- Other Northeast Caucasian-speaking peoples Especially Tsakhurs

Rutulians, also known as the Rutul people or simply Rutuls (Rutul: мыхабыр, romanized: mykhabyr), a Northeast Caucasian ethnic group native to Dagestan and adjacent parts of Azerbaijan. According to the 2021 Russian census, there were 34,259 Rutuls in Russia. The Rutul language is a member of the Northeast Caucasian language family; its speakers often have a good command of Azeri and Russian. The Rutulian culture is close to that of the Tsakhur and other peoples who inhabit the basin of the upper reaches of the Samur River. Most of the Rutuls are engaged in cattle breeding (mostly sheep husbandry), farming, and gardening.

== Geography ==
Most of the Rutulians live in the Rutulsky District of Dagestan. According to the 2010 census, 35,240 Rutulians lived in Russia.

Rutulian villages in Russia: Amsar, Aran, Borch, Chude, Fartma, Fuchukh, Ikhrek, Jilikhur, Kala, Khnov, Khnyukh, Kiche, Kina, Kufa, Luchek, Myukhrek, Natsma, Novy Borch, Pilek, Rutul, Rybalko, Shinaz, Tsudik, Una, Vrush

Rutulian villages and cities in Azerbaijan: Aqbulaq, Aydinbulakh, Baltali, Boyuk Dahna, Dashyuz, Goybulaq, Incha, Kish, Kudurlu, Sheki (Nukha), Shin, Shorsu, Khirsa.

In Azerbaijan, Rutulian residents live in the cities of Sheki (more than 10 thousand), Kakhi, Sumgait, Ganja, Mingechevir, Baku and other cities. The exact number of Rutuls in Azerbaijan is unknown.

In the past, a large number of Rutuls also lived in the Jaro-Belokan region.

== Population ==
1881	1926	1939	1959	1970	1979	1989	2002	2010	2020
12,000	10,496	—	6,732	12,071	15,032	20,388	29,929	35,240	34,259

Losses in the Caucasian War of 1817-1864 and the resettlement of some Rutuls to Turkey, Syria, and other countries were among the factors that contributed to the decline in the total population of Rutulian in the Caucasus.

== History ==
=== Neolithic ===
Archaeologists from the Dagestan Federal Research Center of the Russian Academy of Sciences conducted a study of the Una settlement to confirm the existence of an adit used to extract copper-bearing ore. The results of chemical analysis of samples taken from the adit showed high concentrations of copper, iron, chromium, and nickel. The study also examined the ruins of the settlement: the fortress on the hill, the fortress defenses, and the stairway leading to it, as well as two sites with ancient cemeteries and gravestones. Archaeological data indicate that the age of the Una settlement is over 7000 years. It is the only known adit in Dagestan where copper was extracted.

=== Classical antiquity ===
The early history of Rutulians is connected with the state of Caucasian Albania, formed at the end of the 2nd to the middle of the 1st centuries BC, which included the ancestors of the peoples of southern Dagestan. In the middle of the 1st millennium BC, an Albanian tribal union formed in eastern Transcaucasia, uniting 26 tribes speaking different languages of the Samur ("Lezghin") branch of the Nakh-Dagestani family. These tribes included Albanians, Gargars, Gels, Leghi, Utii, and others. According to some historians, the ancestors of Rutuls were Gargareans. According to other accounts, their ancestors were Albanians or Lega.

According to Robert H. Hewsen, the Albanian tribes were primarily of autochthonous Caucasian origin, although it cannot be said with certainty that this applies to all 26 tribes. G. H. Ibragimov identifies the Rutuls and Tsakhurians with the ancient Gargareans. He believes that it is also quite appropriate to link the ethnonyms "gazalar" (as the Tsakhurians call the Rutuls) and "gargar" meaning 'nationality' as concepts of etymologically common origin.

Archaeological finds in the Rutulian settlement areas show similarities with the Albanian culture of Transcaucasia. Thus, three-tiered burials of the stone box type uncovered in the village of Khnov are quite similar to those in Mingechaur. The openwork bronze bracelets found in one of them are similar to bracelets from the upper layer of the third burial in Mingechaur.

=== 4th century BC ===
In the 4th century BC the ancient Greek historian and geographer Arrian mentions the Albanians in connection with their participation on the side of the Persians at the Battle of Gaugamela (331 BC) against the army of Alexander the Great.

=== 1st century BC ===
In 66 BC the Roman general Pompey invaded Caucasian Albania during his campaign in the Caucasus.

The Caucasian Albanians attempted to act before the Romans could fully deploy. Oroes, king of the Albanians, organised a coordinated attack on the divided Roman forces timed to coincide with the Roman festival of Saturnalia in order to maximise its effect. However, the Roman troops, led by experienced veterans, proved a stronger opponent than the Albanian tribes and the attacks were repulsed. Oroes was forced to submit to Roman terms.

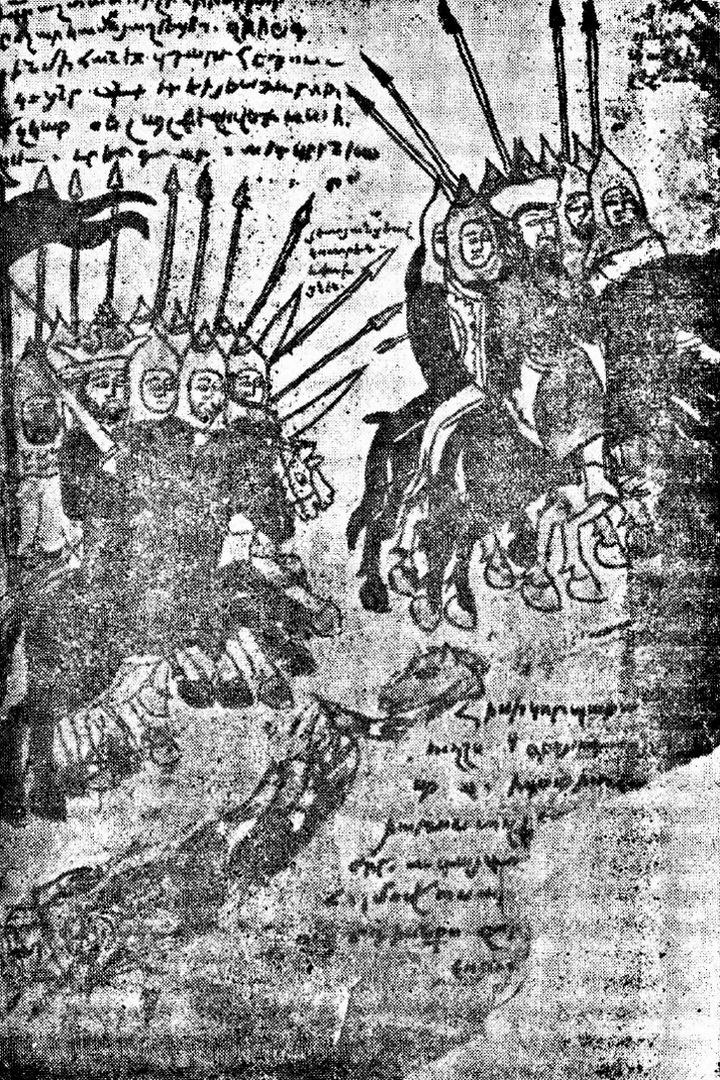
Campaign of an Albanian army against nomadic tribes

=== 6th century ===
One method used by both the Byzantine and the Persian empires to recruit barbarian pagan peoples for military service was to acquire slaves and transform them into soldiers for campaigns against other peoples. Warriors were recruited and paid on specific terms. These forces served as a bulwark of the empire against peoples of their own stock.

Arran (a province of Caucasian Albania, Christian by the 6th century) maintained links with Byzantium despite being under Persian rule at the time. Clerics from Arran and Armenia spread Christianity among the Huns, a pagan nomadic people, taught them to use brick and stone in construction, and disseminated agricultural knowledge. These facts impressed "the rulers of these peoples; they were astonished and rejoiced at the men, honoured them and each called them to his side, to his people, asking that they be teachers to them." In 537 missionaries from Arran created a script for the Huns.

=== Middle Ages ===
According to legend, Rutul was formed from seven small villages, Shinaz - from five villages. Lavrov believes that the village of Rutul has existed for a long time. On one of its streets, he discovered a settlement that dates back to before the 8th century. Mention of 'Rutul' is found in the ancient manuscript "Akhty-name", which states that during the war with the Khazars, the Akhtyn ruler Dervishan called for the help of 'brave warriors Rutul, Jenik, and Rufuk". The first written information about the places of residence of the Rutuls is found in the works of medieval authors. Thus, the Arab cosmographer of the XIII century, Zakaria al-Qazwini, mentions the Rutul village of Shinaz. He wrote:

"Shinas is a town in the country of Lakzan, on the slope of a high mountain. There is no other way to it except through the top of the mountain .... They grow a kind of grain called as-sult and some mountain apples. Its inhabitants are kind, benevolent, and hospitable to the poor and friendly to strangers. They are engaged in the manufacture of weapons, such as armor, chain mail, and other types of weaponry."

The works of Arab historians and geographers from the 9th to 10th centuries provide a substantial list of ethnographic territories and possessions in the Caucasus, among which Lakzan is mentioned. Arab geographers speak of the large population and belligerence of the inhabitants of the Samur region, which is located on the territory of the former Caucasian Albania.

In the 13th century, during the Mongol invasion, Rutul and Tsakhur managed to avoid dependence on the Golden Horde and form two large communal unions.

"Khnov army", that is, the militia of Rutuls from the village of Khnov is mentioned in 1598, among the allies of the Tarkov shamkhal.

The Safavid state, which was formed in the late 15th - early 16th centuries, also included the lands of Shirvan, where the Rutuls and other peoples lived. The Safavids' predecessors, the rulers of Shirvan and Ak-Koyunlu, were Sunnis. The Safavids, in turn, acted under the banner of Shiism. Sultan Iskender Kara-Koyunlu wanted to subjugate the entire territory of the Shirvanshahs' state., and fought against Shirvanshah Khalilullah I. According to Thomas of Metsop, Iskender Kara-Koyunlu '... gathered an army and set out on a campaign against the city of Shemakha and its region.' After capturing Shemakha, he headed to the borders of the Ilisu Sultanate. The Tsakhurs, who were likely under the influence of the Shirvanshah state at that time, fought in this battle on the side of Shirvanshah Khalilullah I.

In 1432, the inhabitants of Rutul, along with the troops of Sultan Iskander Kara-Koyunlu, attacked Tsakhur, but the assault was repelled by the inhabitants of Tsakhur. However, in 1495-1496, the Rutuls and Tsakhurs fought against the village of Khryug, supported by another village, Akhty. In 1536-1537, Rutuls and Kumukhs attacked and burned Akhty, a stronghold of the Shirvanshahs' power. In 1540-1541, after the Safavid power was established in Shirvan, Rutuls and Kumukhs launched another attack on Akhty and burned it again. Following this, the Akhtyns, accustomed to maintaining their influence with the help of Shemakha, which became the seat of the Shirvan beylerbeks in 1538, turned to the new government for assistance, represented by the beylerbek Alkhas Mirza Safavid. Alkhas Mirza, acting in the interests of Iran, which sought to establish a foothold in Sunni territory, organized an attack on Rutul. Derbent troops led by Alkhas Mirza attacked Rutul, resulting in the burning of Rutul, which was allied with Kumukh, by the Qizilbash-Akhtyn army in 1541-1542. Alkhas Mirza was a representative of the Iranian authorities in the northeastern Caucasus, serving as the ruler of the Safavid district centered around the city of Derbent. Following this, the Rutuls, together with the Cubans, burned Akhty again in 1542 – 1543. Around 1560, the Rutuls from the village of Khnov, together with the Tsakhurs, attacked the Georgians, forcing them to move beyond the Alazani River. There is a legend about the struggle between the Rutulian village of Ikhrek and the now non-existent village of Kharytsa.

On the territory of modern Azerbaijan, there are the oldest historically formed Rutulian settlements, which are more than 1,500 years old. In subsequent periods, partial re-emigration occurred: in the 17th century, during the Safavid state, the Rutulians from the village of Borch partially moved to the plains of the Sheki state (north of modern Azerbaijan). and founded the settlement of Shin there.

The first mention of the Rutulian Free Society (Rutulian Magal) dates back to 1728, but it is possible that it existed earlier. The Estate and Land Commission left information about the genealogy of the Rutulian beks, compiled in 1873, which indicates that the Rutulian beks, starting with Kazi-bek, have lived in Rutul since 1574. According to James Olson, a powerful political confederation, the Rutulian Magal existed from the 16th to the 18th century. Each mahal village had its own civil and military leader, who was connected with representatives of other villages. The village leaders, in interaction with one another, formed a common policy.

In the 1730s, the Rutulians waged a seven-year war against the village of Khryug and made peace with it in 1739 – 1740. In 1774 – 1776, together with the residents of Akhta, they again fought against the village of Khryug. Eventually, the Rutulians managed to subjugate Khryug and, together with another village, Zrykh, annex it to their Magal. In the 18th century, the Rutulians also captured the more remote villages of Kaka, Yalakh, and Lutkun, which had previously been part of the Akhtypara Magal. Despite this, two Rutulian villages (Ikhrek and Myukhrek) were part of the Kazikumukh Khanate, and the village of Khnov, after the Khnov uprising, became part of the Akhtynsky District. Also, on the territory of the Rutulians, there is a village called Nizhniy Katrukh, where Azerbaijanis live. The inhabitants of this village consider themselves descendants of the people of Shirvan, who were captured by the Rutulians during one of their raids around the year 1700.

In the 18th century, the inhabitants of the Rutulian villages, along with other peoples of Dagestan, resisted the Persian troops of Nadir Shah, who invaded the region. According to legends, Nadir Shah's detachment, under the command of a Persian khan, besieged Rutul in 1741 but was unable to capture it.

=== Russian Empire ===
At the beginning of the 19th century, the Russian Empire began its military expansion in the region, which the Rutulians resisted. The Rutulians refused to pay taxes to the imperial treasury and resisted the attempts of the tsar's generals to subjugate them.

"The Rutulian society has enough of its own bread, pastures, and does not need anything except salt. They do not concern themselves with paying tribute and respond to demands with disagreement, which exists between the villages of the entire society."

In 1838, the Rutulian leader Agabek al-Rutuli led a widespread uprising against the Russian Empire, but over the next few years, this uprising was suppressed. In 1844, the Russian Empire captured the territory of the Rutulian Magal. In 1839, the Rutulian Magal was administratively annexed to the Ilisu Sultanate. In 1844, Sultan Daniyal-bek joined Shamil's side; the sultanate was abolished, and the Rutulian Free Society, together with the Ilisu Sultanate, came under the temporary control of the Jaro-Belokan Military District of the Russian Empire. The Rutulian Magal and the former sultanate were united into one district, the Yelisu District, which was under the control of a Russian officer. This district was divided into three 'naibs': Rutulian, Yelisu, and Ingelo. Each was headed by a naib appointed by the chief of the Jaro-Belokan Military District. During the tsarist era, a road was built by local residents through the territory of the Rutulians, connecting Rutul with Akhty and Derbent. According to sources, in 1820, the Rutulians were considered dependent on the Russian Empire and 'had to pay the Russians a tribute imposed on 19 villages in the amount of 500 rubles", "but they refused and did not pay".

"The Rutulians have not ceased to be malicious to this day, and not only do they themselves have hostile designs against the government, but they seek to spread them among neighboring tribes, villainously persecuting those who deviate from the path of lawlessness they have chosen."

— Report dated April 10, 1842, No. 357, from General Golovin to Prince Chershnyshev.

=== USSR ===
In 1917, the Mountain Republic was established, Arabic was adopted as the state language, and it was taught in schools. After the October Revolution, in 1921, the Dagestan ASSR was created. The Rutuls did not recognize Soviet power and waged armed resistance against it. Thus, in May 1930, an anti-Soviet uprising broke out in Khnov. The rebels captured another Rutulian village, Borch, and moved toward Rutul, capturing the villages of Gdym and Fiy in the Akhtynsky District along the way. Units of the 5th Regiment of the North Caucasian OGPU Division and detachments of Red partisans were sent against them, brutally suppressing the uprising.

Since 1925, the authorities initiated an anti-Islamic campaign, which consisted of closing schools, eliminating the Arabic language, and exterminating local imams. From this period, the government focused on the Turkic population of the region, and the Azerbaijani language became the official language. This continued until 1928, when the Avar, Azerbaijani, Dargin, and Lezgin languages were declared the state languages of the autonomy. In the late 1920s, the Soviet government decided to assimilate the Rutuls and Tsakhurs with the Azerbaijanis, and the Aguls were classified as Lezgins. According to James Olson, the policy of cultural manipulation by the authorities at the time led to increased resentment among the population of Rutulian, a rejection of Russian culture, and many Rutuls opposed the process of merging with the Azerbaijanis. The assimilation policy of the authorities, which intensified during these years, led to a drop in the official number of Rutuls from 10,500 people in 1929 to 6,700 people in 1955, after which the population of Rutulians began to grow due to natural population growth. As of January 1, 1989, 953 Rutulians were members of the CPSU (candidates and party members).

In some Russian sources (e.g., maps), until the mid-19th century, the territory of the modern Rutulsky District was called the Luchekskoye naibstvo (with its center in the village of Luchek).

=== World War II ===
Along with other peoples, the Rutuls also fought in battles against the German troops. During the war, about 3,000 people from the Rutulsky district region joined the army, both as volunteers and through mobilization (according to incomplete data). Including: from Rutul, more than 800 people; from Ikhrek, about 300; from Shinaz, about 250; from Luchek, more than 150; and from Mukhrek, 72 people. A large number of Rutuls were awarded government honors. Many Rutuls who fought died a heroic death. More than 1,000 people did not return from the war, and about 300 Rutuls received awards for their military feats. One of the Rutuls, Gasret Aliyev, was awarded the title of Hero of the Soviet Union.

== Economy ==
The inhabitants led a sedentary lifestyle, engaged in horse breeding, transhumance sheep breeding, weapons manufacturing, blacksmithing, ceramics and hunting.

== Symbolism ==
One of the concepts for the flag of the Rutulian people is the flag published on the Internet in 2013. The flag is a rectangular cloth with a 2:3 aspect ratio, consisting of three equal horizontal stripes: two dark green stripes separated by a white stripe. In the center of the flag is a crescent and a star.

Flag (date created: before 2013)

== Anthropology ==
Anthropologically, the Rutuls belong to the Caucasian type of the Balkan-Caucasian race (Cheekbone length: 143.1 mm; chest diameter: 3.63 points; body length: 161.1 cm.). In terms of pigmentation, the Rutulians are similar to representatives of the Caucasian race (Ando-Tsuntinians, Avars, Laks, and Dargins).

Based on dental characteristics, they are similar to the Tindians, some groups of Avars, Akhvakhs, Bagulals, Bezhtins, and Kusar Lezgins.

== Genetics ==
Frequency distribution of the main Y-chromosome haplogroups in Rutuls (%).

	n	E1b1	F	G	I	J1	J2	L	R1a	R1b	R2a	T	Other	Notes
Rutulians	24	0.0	58	37.5	0.0	58	4.2	0.0	0.0	0.0	0.0	0.0	F[xG,I,J2,K]=58	Nasidze (2004)

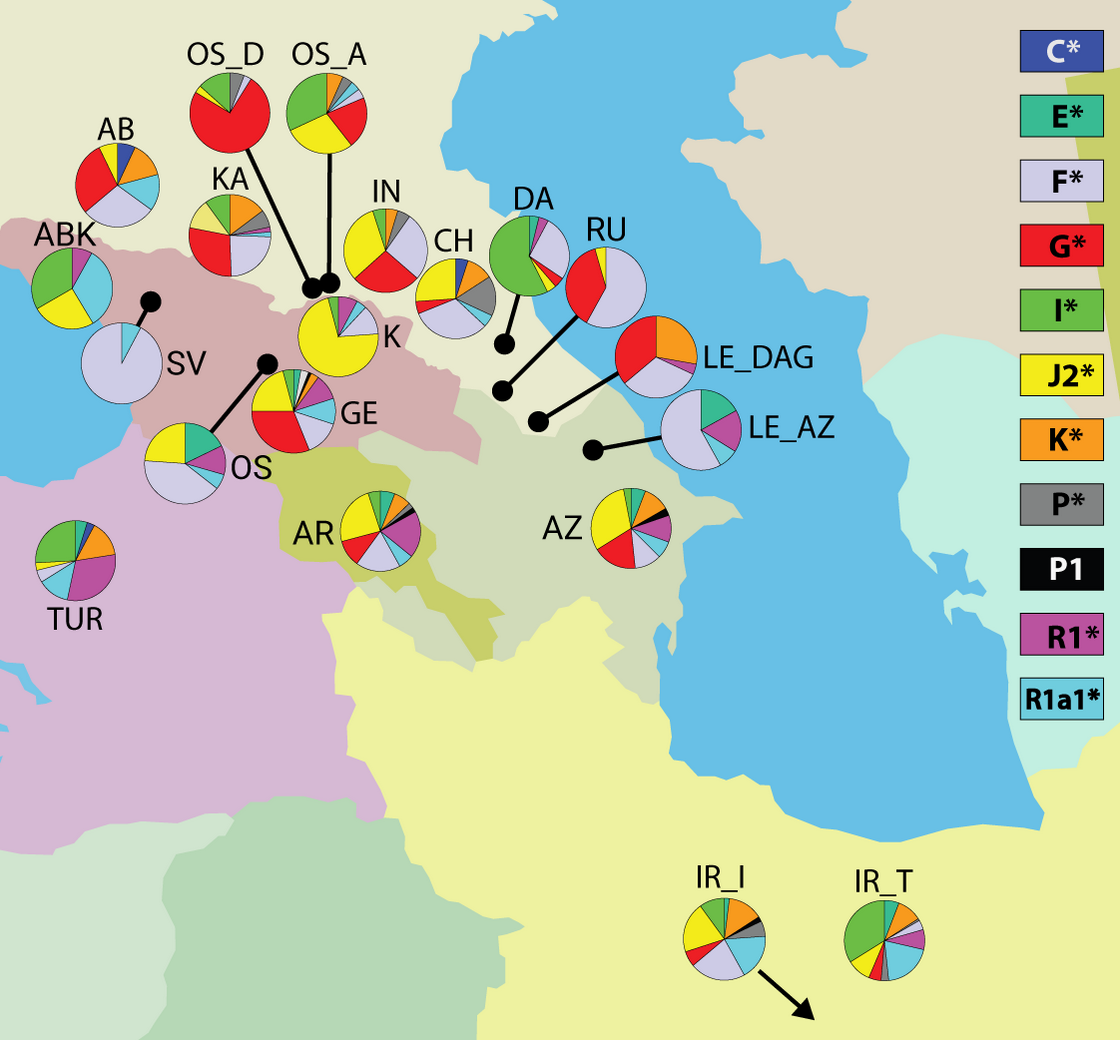
Map of the Caucasus indicating the frequencies of haplogroup Y-SNP. AB — Abazins, ABK — Abkhazians, AR — Armenians, AZ — Azerbaijanis, CH — Chechens, DA — Dargins, GE — Georgians, IN — Ingush, K — Georgians (Kazbegi), KA — Kabardians, LE_AZ — Lezgins (from Azerbaijan), LE_DAG — Lezgins (from Dagestan), OS — Ossetians (South Ossetia), OS_A — Ossetians (Ardon), OS_D — Ossetians (Digora), RU — Rutuls, SV — Svans, TUR — Turks, IR_I — Iranians (Isfahan), IR_T — Iranians (Tehran)

According to another genetic study, the following haplogroups are found to predominate among Rutuls:

- J1 (63%)
- G2 (14%)
- R1b (5%)
- T (7%)
- L (5%)

== Religion ==
The Rutuls adhere to Sunni Islam. The earliest attempts of Arabs to affirm as Dagestan concern the 7th century, and in Rutul's territory they made the greatest success. The earliest monument of Muslim culture testifies to it on caucasus - a tombstone of Sheikh Magomeda-ibn-Asada-ibn-Mugal, buried in Khnov in 675 AD About early Islamisation of Rutuls the earliest testify also in mountains of Dagestan monuments building epigraphic, found in some Rutulian villages. It is a stone in a wall of a building of a mosque of settlement village Luchek on which the chronograph text in the Arabian language is cut, Islam carrying the statement here to 128 of Hijra, that is 745 – 746. Other stone with the chronograph text has remained in a settlement Ikhrek mosque of Ikhrek, in it is spoken «about restoration of the destroyed mosque in 407 of Hijra»

There are many Kufic inscriptions in the territory of the Rutuls, dating back to the 11th-13th centuries. The ancient manuscript "Akhty-name" contains a legend that some of the grandsons of the legendary Arab conqueror of Dagestan Abu Muslim settled in Rutul, Khnov and Shinaz. According to Lavrov, the presence of Arabic inscriptions and the fact that a khanqah (Sufi lodge) existed in Rutul in the 12th century indicate that by this time, Islam had already firmly established itself among the Rutulians.

With the penetration of Islam, Arabic writing and Arabic literature became widespread, which contributed to the fact that local residents began to capture some historical information in various chronicles, tombstones, on building stones erected in the walls of mosques and minarets.

In this regard, the Samur district was particularly distinguished, which was called the "central point of Arab colonization in Dagestan.".

This affected the spread of Arabic inscriptions made in Kufic script. Lavrov calls the upper reaches of the Samur River, where the Rutuls live, "the richest area in the Caucasus for the spread of Kufic inscriptions.". Such an abundance of Kufic inscriptions in a relatively small territory inhabited by the Rutuls proves that "there [in the territory of the Rutuls] the Arabic element, brought there by the followers of the prophet, was predominantly and quickly accepted and took root, so that the end of the 12th and the beginning of the 13th centuries should be considered the era of its prosperity.".

Before the population adopted Islam, other beliefs were apparently widespread here. In the area where the Rutuls settled, there are many "sacred places" (pirs) and ancient images of crosses. According to legend, the inhabitants of Ikhrek resisted the adoption of Islam for a long time, and near the village of Arakul, after the appearance of Islam, the village of Siyakh continued to exist for a long time, the inhabitants of which professed Judaism. In 1952, in the area of Ruhudjug, near Luchek, scientists discovered rock paintings accompanied by the dates 751-752, 1127, 1165-1166 and 1213-1214 according to the Gregorian calendar., and also fragments of Arabic inscriptions were found. The drawings depict horsemen, archers, people in high hats, animals (horses, mountain tours), a large sailing ship with a dozen pairs of oars, crosses, tamgas, etc. Lavrov came to the conclusion that "the detailed image of the ship proves the connections of the local population with the Caspian coast, and the image of the cross indicates that even after the arrival of the Arabs, part of the local population continued to profess Christianity, which was brought here in the pre-Arab era.".

The Rutuls currently adhere to Islam, but part of the population still retains elements of ancient folk beliefs. For example, the Rutuls have 'sanctuaries'—'ujag'abyr'—which are a type of Caucasian feast. These 'sanctuaries' are found both within the framework of general Rutulian traditions and in the context of local, intra-tukhum practices. One of the oldest feasts is the 15th century feast in Hnov. The worship of sacred groves, mountains, springs, some graves and places associated with the lives of individual "saints" was preserved. Fire was also considered sacred and revered. In this regard, it is noteworthy that one of the Rutulian peaks is known as Tsaylahan, which translates as "place of fire.".

Lavrov L. I. claims that the mosque in Ikhrek, dating back to the beginning of the 11th century, was built on the site of an old mosque. An Arab-Persian inscription from the 11th-12th centuries was also recorded in the village of Kala. Similar texts were also found in other settlements in this area.

== Language ==
=== General information ===
They speak the Rutulian language. Together with the closely related Tsakhur language, they form the Rutul-Tsakhur subgroup of the "Lezgin" (Samur) branch of the Nakh-Dagestani family.

There is a close relationship between the Rutul, Tsakhur, Kryz and Budukh languages. and their commonality with the Albanian (Gargar) language, which had written and literary traditions in Christian Caucasian Albania. The surviving common ethnic term for speakers of some languages of the Rutulian group, as well as the close relationship of these languages, give reason to believe that these languages once had a common territory in Northern Azerbaijan (the left bank of the Kura) and Southwestern Dagestan. This territory represents a significant part of Caucasian Albania.

The reports of ancient writers allow us to assert that the ethnic core of ancient Caucasian Albania was concentrated on the left bank of the Kura. The reports of Arab authors about a special language in Barda are also noteworthy: "The language in , Armenia and Arran is Persian and Arabic, excluding the area of the city of Dabil, around it they speak Armenian; in the country of Berda, the language is Aran", further: "There (in Andarabe - the name of a place one farsakh from Berda) grows a fruit called Zukal" (Rutul: zuqal - dogwood (cornus)).

There are four main dialects in the Rutulian language: Rutul, Shinaz, Ikhrek-Mukhrek and Borchi-Khnov. It is noteworthy that differences in dialects are observed not only among villages, but also within the same village. For example, in Rutul, the residents of the Akh quarter call water "khye", and the residents of the Furahe quarter - "khyed"; the former call a carpet "keden", and the latter "khyeden".

Currently, the Rutulian language has the status of one of the state languages of the Republic of Dagestan.

=== Arabic script ===
Before the revolution, the Rutulians used the Arabic script. A song text in Rutulian language by the 18th-century poet Kur Rajab is known from an Arabic script (ajam) written source.

In 1917, the Mountain Republic was created, an independent confederation consisting of more than 10 North Caucasian states. Arabic was adopted as the state language and taught in schools.

=== Latin script ===
In 1928, a Latin-based script was created in the Soviet Union.

In 2013, a Rutulian alphabet based on the Latin script was developed in Azerbaijan.

=== Cyrillic script ===
In 1990, in Russia, the Rutulian alphabet was created based on the Cyrillic script.

=== Other languages ===
All Rutuls are bilingual, some of the population speaks three or more languages. The Azerbaijani language, which has long been the language of interethnic communication in Southern Dagestan, is quite widespread among them. Back in the 1950s, L. I. Lavrov noted that the Rutuls use their native language "at home, at work and at meetings, but if there are people at meetings who do not know this language (Tsakhurs, Lezgins, etc.), then the speakers most often speak Azerbaijani." НIn this language, the newspaper "Kızıl Çoban" ("Red Shepherd") was published in Rutul since 1932, and Rutulian poets Gezerchi Gajiev and Jameseb Salarov wrote in it. While studying the vocabulary of animal husbandry in the Rutulian language, linguist F. I. Guseinov found many Turkic borrowings in it.

The Russian language was practically unknown until the beginning of the 20th century. In 1898, K. F. Gan reported that "nobody knows the Russian language". Even representatives of the social "elite" who had contacts with representatives of the tsarist administration more often than others were considered such. Botanist, professor N. I. Kuznetsov, who visited the house of the elder in the Rutul village of Shinaz at the beginning of the 20th century, wrote: "He shook our hands, quickly said something in Tatar (Serker-Gadzhi did not understand anything in Russian, like all the other elders of the Samur district)". The opening of the Rutul one-class school in 1914 with instruction in Russian, one can assume, contributed to the familiarization of some Rutulians with it. Until 1955, teaching in Rutulian schools was conducted in the Azerbaijani language, but since 1955, at the request of the Rutuls and Tsakhurs, classes began to be conducted in Russian. In 1991-1992, primary education was transferred to the Rutulian language.

After the establishment of Soviet power, the issue of creating a Rutulian script based on Cyrillic was raised within the framework of language policy. In 1930, the resolution of the 5th Session of the Central Executive Committee of the Dagestan ASSR of the 7th convocation stated: "The People's Commissariat of Education and the Institute of Dagestan Culture shall outline a number of measures to study the possibility of creating a script based on Cyrillic and textbooks in their native languages for small mountain peoples (Agul, Rutul, Didoev), but subsequently, as Lavrov writes, "the creation of a Rutulian script based on Cyrillic was deemed inappropriate." He noted that the reasons for this were "the reluctance of the population, its small numbers, the lack of trained personnel and, finally, the almost universal knowledge of such a developed language as Azerbaijani by the Rutuls." On August 10, 1990, the Council of Ministers of the Dagestan ASSR issued a Resolution on the introduction of the status of a written language based on the Cyrillic alphabet (Russian graphics) for the Agul, Rutulian and Tsakhur languages and the approval of alphabets for these languages.

== Society and culture ==
=== Society ===
The Rutuls had a simple (or nuclear) family type. In the 19th and early 20th centuries, separate large undivided paternal families were preserved. The largest kinship group was the tukhum (clan), headed by its oldest member. At the council of the heads of individual families of the tukhum, matters were decided on the division of property, marriages were agreed upon, etc. According to the number of children, families were large.

=== Crafts ===
The main occupations are livestock farming (sheep herding and cattle breeding) and arable farming. Cultivated crops are rye, spring and winter wheat, spelt, barley, millet. Traditional home crafts are carpet weaving, cloth making, production of woolen knitted footwear, felt, patterned socks, ceramics without a potter's wheel, processing of stone, copper, silver. The village of Shinaz was famous for its crafts even in the Middle Ages. Shinaz artisans made weapons, chain mail (Rutul: dir), armor (Rutul: javashin) and other types of weapons.

In the past, there were many hereditary construction masters in Rutul and Ikhrek. The Rutuls and Tsakhurs, unlike other peoples of southern Dagestan, had widespread professions of carpenters, masons, tinsmiths and builders. These craftsmen often went to seasonal work. Many remarkable structures: bridges, houses, arches, were built by Rutulian and Tsakhur craftsmen in the cities of Georgia and Azerbaijan. During the Soviet period, there were a small number of silversmiths in Rutul.

=== Traditional housing ===
The Rutuls built settlements in hard-to-reach places. Frequent wars and enemy raids forced the Rutuls to build fortress walls, signal and defensive towers to strengthen their defenses. One of these towers was located in the village of Una. The name of this village itself comes from the Rut. phrase "un a" and is translated as "give a signal."

Дoma stone one-story or two-story with a flat roof and the location of the barns below, and living quarters above. A narrow terrace runs along the upper part of the facade, to which an external staircase leads. Hearths are wall-mounted, reminiscent of fireplaces, often decorated with large stucco ornaments.

=== Types of housing ===
Traditional dwellings of the Rutuls:

- The earliest - a one-story or one-room house raised on high stone pillars, standing separately from the outbuildings;
- Two-story without a yard and outbuildings;
- A one-story or two-story house with a small open yard where there are utility and auxiliary rooms.

=== Traditional clothes ===
Rutulian traditional clothing is similar to the clothing of other peoples of southern Dagestan.

Men's clothing: Outerwear consisted of a tunic-like shirt (Rutul: ukhun) with a round neckline and a straight vertical slit in the front, trousers with narrow legs (Rutul: badu), a slightly fitted beshmet (Rutul: arkhaluk), and a North Caucasian-style cherkeska with cartridge holders (gazyrs). The headgear was a papakha made from long-fleeced sheepskin (Rutul: barmak). Footwear included knitted woolen boots with upturned toes (Rutul: kyamashbyr) and leather sandals (Rutul: kelamby).
Women's clothing: Outerwear consisted of a long open-front robe (Rutul: valzhag). In villages bordering Azerbaijan, women wore a short, hip-length open jacket and a long wide skirt. The headgear was a bag-shaped scarf (Rutul: katsigen) and a scarf folded into a triangle. Footwear included knitted patterned boots with upturned toes. Silver jewelry was a part of women's attire.

=== National cuisine ===
The main food is flour and meat and dairy. Several types of bread were baked. The most common dishes: pies with meat or grass (gyrts), khinkali of different shapes and sizes, kurze (gyrtsbyr), pilaf, cabbage rolls (dulma), millet and oatmeal porridge, homemade pasta with dried meat or lamb (kyinkii).

=== Literature and folklore ===
The Rutuls have developed various genres of folklore: ashug poetry, proverbs, sayings, fairy tales, legends, ritual songs. Rutulian poets and singers are known for their work far beyond the Rutulksy district.

The first congress of writers of the USSR was attended by Rutulian poets: Dzhameseb Salarov, Gezerchi Gadzhiev and Nurahmed Ramazanov, who laid the foundation for Rutulian literature of the 20th century. Masterpieces of Rutulian poets and writers have been preserved in the Azerbaijani language: Zainab Hinavi (Khnov) (11th-12th centuries) (court poetess of the Georgian queen Tamara), Ikhrek Rajab (Ikhrek). The names of ashughs have also been preserved in the people's memory: Malla Turab, Kabilov Ali, Sakit Hinavi (Khnov), Gadzhi-Yusuf Medzhidov, Shafi Ibragimov (Amsar), Magomed Ulileev, Veysal Cherkezov and others.

Outside of Russia, the following are known: in Azerbaijan: Ismail Dagestanli, Natavan Dagestanli, Fezli-Gerey Rutuli; in Syria: Ulfat Idlibi; in Turkey: Ibrahim Shinazi and others.

=== Painting ===
Rutulian artists: Shevket Khalilov, Zakhar Azizov, Azizkhanov M. and others.

== Science ==
In the 13th century, a dynasty of scientists from the Saidar clan was formed in the Rutul village of Shinaz. At the beginning of the 14th century, Shirvan Shah wrote a letter and called Said Efendi I the great ustaz (teacher). His descendants, including the famous scientist, the first astronomer in Dagestan, Ismail Efendi, opened a medieval university, an observatory and a library in the village of Shinaz. The university, which Ismail Efendi founded in the 17th century, studied astronomy, mathematics, philosophy, logic and medicine. The observatory opened by Ismail Efendi was the first in Dagestan. The ruins of the astronomical school have survived to this day in the village of Shinaz. Another famous representative of this family is Said Efendi II (Said Shinazi) - an Islamic scholar-theologian, sheikh, one of the teachers of Magomed Yaragsky. The villages of Rutul and Ikhrek were also famous for their Arabic scholars.

Currently, more than a hundred Rutulian residents have PhD and DSc degrees. Among them: Doctor of Pedagogical Sciences, Professor Alisultan Alisultanov, Doctor of Philological Sciences, Professor Svetlana Makhmudova, Doctor of Technical Sciences, Professor Mikail Verdiev (Jilihur), Doctor of Social Sciences, PhD in History Gamzat Musayev (Shinaz), PhD in History Kurban Kurbanov (Luchek), PhD in Economics Narman Ayubov, Doctor of Technical Sciences Serker Gadzhiev, D.Sc. (Biology) Davud Devrishev, D.Sc. (Pedagogy), Professor Selim Abdurakhmanov, Ph.D. (Philology), Professor Farida Huseynova, Ph.D. (History) Idayat Huseynov, Ph.D. (Physics and Mathematics) Verdi Verdiev, Historian Fazil Dashlay, historian Bagautdin Hasanov, and others. Doctor of Philosophy Kazem Dagestani is known abroad.

== Sport ==
Rutulian athletes have become World, European, USSR and Russian Champions many times. They are: USSR Champion in Freestyle Wrestling and Sambo — Kurban Agayev; Honored Master of Sports Vagab Kazibekov; the first ever 4-time European Champion in Taekwondo — Seifulla Magomedov; the first Russian World Champion in Freestyle Wrestling — Saniyat Ganachuyeva; World, European and Russian Champion in Universal Combat, Russian Champion in Jiu-Jitsu — Marif Piraev; World Champion in Mixed Martial Arts — Kavkaz Sultanmagomedov; World Champion in Mixed Martial Arts and Pankration — Yamil Efendiev; World and European Champion in Kickboxing — Vagif Abdullaev; Russian Champion in Greco-Roman Wrestling — Milad Alirzaev; 2-time World Champion in Kickboxing — Sabir Abdullaev; Russian Boxing Champion - Vadim Musayev; World and Russian Boxing Champion - Balu Sauer, Honored Trainer of Russia; Coach of the Turkish Youth Freestyle Wrestling Team - Abduselim Rizvanov; captain of the Syrian national basketball team - Shamil Dagestani and others.

== Notable Rutuls ==
- Gasret Aliev — a Hero of Soviet Union, 1st secretary of the Communist Party of the Soviet Union in Rutul from 1957 to 1961
- İbrahim Şinasi — the founder of Turkish dramaturgy
- Ismayil Daghistanli — Azerbaijani and Soviet stage and film actor and pedagogue
- Saniyat Ganachueva — first Russian world champion in women's freestyle wrestling
- Seyfula Magomedov — taekwondo practitioner, the first ever 4-time European Taekwondo Champion
- Ulfat Idlibi — Syrian writer
- Vadim Musaev — professional boxer

== See also ==
- Rutulian language
- Rutulsky District
