= Tsudik =

Tsudik Tsudik
- Selo
- Location in Dagestan Tsudik (Russia)
- Coordinates: 41°39′58″N 47°16′50″E
- Country: Russia
- Federal subject: Republic of Dagestan
- District: Rutulsky District
- Municipality: Myukhrek Rural Settlement
- First mentioned: 1970
- Officially established: 1989

Population (2021)
  - Total: 442
- Time zone: +3
- Postal code: 368700

Tsudik (Rutulian: Tsudik) is a rural locality (a selo) in Rutulsky District, Republic of Dagestan, Russia. It is part of the Myukhrek Rural Settlement.

== Geography ==
The village is located on the southern slope of the Samur Ridge, on the Myukhrek-Chay River (a tributary of the Lykhdy Samur), 20 km northwest of the district center, the village of Rutul.

== History ==
It was officially recognized as a separate village by a decree of the Presidium of the Supreme Soviet of the Dagestan ASSR on 17 August 1989. Before this date, Tsudik was considered one of the quarters of the village of Myukhrek.

== Population ==
The village is mono-ethnic, inhabited by Rutulians.
