= Fartma =

Fartma ФартӀма, Хъартма
- Former village
- Location in Dagestan Fartma (Russia)
- Coordinates: 41°39′24.7″N 47°17′9.6″E
- Country: Russia
- Federal subject: Republic of Dagestan
- District: Rutulsky District
- Founded: 19th–20th centuries

Population
  - Total: 0

Fartma (Rutulian: ФартӀма, Хъартма) is an abandoned Rutulian rural locality in Rutulsky District of the Republic of Dagestan, Russia.

== Etymology ==
The name of the village is thought to come from the Rutul word хъар ("pit"), possibly referring to its location inside a large depression.

== History ==
The exact date of the settlement’s origin is unknown. It is believed to have appeared in the late 19th – early 20th centuries, when people from other villages, searching for favorable pastures, settled in Fartma. The first houses soon appeared. Inhabitants belonged to two tukhums — mitarar and manafar.

In the 1960s, residents of Fartma and the nearby village of Natsma were resettled to Tsudik. Later, the fields where the village once stood were cultivated by the collective farm "Red Partisan".

A 1962 source mentions Fartma as an offshoot of Myukhrek, along with Natsma.

== Geography ==
The village was located on the slope of a mountain, at the winter pasture of Myukhrek. The area was well suited for agriculture and animal husbandry.
