= Fuchukh =

Fuchukh Fuchukh, Фучух
- Village
- Location in Dagestan Fuchukh (Russia)
- Coordinates: 41°33′39″N 47°30′39″E
- Country: Russia
- Federal subject: Republic of Dagestan
- District: Rutulsky District
- Rural settlement: Rutulsky Selsoviet

Population (2010)
  - Total: 3
- Postal code: 368700

Fuchukh (Rutulian: Fuchukh) — Rutulian village, rural locality (a selo) in Rutulsky District of the Republic of Dagestan, Russia. According to the charter of the municipal district "Rutulsky District," it is part of Rutulsky Selsoviet.

== Geography ==
The village is located in the valley of the Lakunkam River on the southern slope of the Samur Ridge, 7 km northeast of the district center Rutul.

== Population ==
The village is monoethnic, inhabited by Rutulians (Sunni Muslims).
