= Küdürlü =

Küdürlü or Kyudyurlyu may refer to:

- Küdürlü, Agdam, Azerbaijan
- Küdürlü, Qakh, Azerbaijan
- Küdürlü, Shaki, Azerbaijan
