= Məşədilər =

Məşədilər or Meshadlyar or Mashadlyar may refer to:

- Məşədilər, Jalilabad, Azerbaijan
- Meshadilyar, Azerbaijan
- Əfətli, Azerbaijan
