= Pilek =

Pilek Pilek
- Former rural locality
- Location within Republic of Dagestan Location within Russia
- Coordinates: 41°37′24″N 47°20′23″E
- Country: Russia
- Federal subject: Republic of Dagestan
- District: Rutulsky District
- Municipality: Amsar Rural Settlement

Population (1970)
  - Total: 149

Pilek (Rutul: Pilek) is an abandoned selo in Rutulsky District of the Republic of Dagestan, Russia. It was part of the Amsar Rural Settlement until its abandonment in the 1970s.

== Geography ==
Pilek was located on the right slope of the Yukhurmeri river valley, about 2 km north-northeast of Amsar.

== History ==
Archaeological findings in Pilek included early written monuments. According to local elders, the village was formed from the union of seven tukhums (patrilineal clans): Damyrar, Semedeyer, Mamaïer, Amragyar, Abdulayer, Kartlaïer, and Baghyser.

In 1869, statistics recorded 12 households with a population of 60. During the Soviet era, due to harsh mountain conditions, inhabitants gradually resettled to other villages of Rutulsky and Magaramkentsky Districts starting from the 1950s. By the late 1970s, the aul ceased to exist.

== Population ==
Population of Pilek
Year	1895	1926	1939	1970
Population	63	117	108	149
