= Rutul =

Rutul may refer to:

- Rutul people, an ethnic group in the Republic of Dagestan, Russia
- Rutul language, their Lezgic language
- Rutul (rural locality), a rural locality (a selo) in the Republic of Dagestan, Russia

== See also ==
- Rutuli, members of the legendary Italic tribe
- RU-TUL, ISO 3166-2:RU abbreviation for Tula Oblast, Russia
