= Kala, Republic of Dagestan =

Kala Кала Кӏелед
- Selo
- Location within Republic of Dagestan Location within Russia
- Coordinates: 41°34′N 47°21′E
- Country: Russia
- Region: Republic of Dagestan
- District: Rutulsky District
- Time zone: UTC+3:00

Kala (Russian: Кала; Rutul: Кӏелед) is a rural locality (a selo) in Amsarsky Selsoviet, Rutulsky District, Republic of Dagestan, Russia. The population is 408 (2010 census); 427 (2002 census); 272 (1989 Soviet census). and is made up of Rutuls. There are three streets.

== Geography ==
Kala is located 9 km northwest of Rutul, the district's administrative centre, by road. Kufa and Amsar are the nearest rural localities.
