= Novy Borch =

Novy Borch Tsindy Bydzh
- Village
- Location in Dagestan Novy Borch (Russia)
- Coordinates: 43°29′13″N 47°02′43″E
- Country: Russia
- Federal subject: Republic of Dagestan
- District: Rutulsky District
- Rural settlement: Borchsky Selsoviet
- Founded: 1973

Population (2010)
  - Total: 1,605
- Postal code: 368700

Novy Borch (Rutulian: Tsindy Bydzh) is a Rutulian village-exclave of Rutulsky District, Republic of Dagestan, Russia. It is part of Borchsky Selsoviet. The settlement is an enclave within the territory of Babayurtovsky District.

== Geography ==
The village is located within Babayurtovsky District, 25 km southeast of the village of Babayurt.

== History ==
In 1973, a decision was made to resettle the residents of the Kuibyshev collective farm of Borch village to the pastures of the state farm named after the 50th anniversary of the Dagestan ASSR in Rutulsky District. In 1986, by decree of the Presidium of the Supreme Soviet of the RSFSR, the new settlement was officially named Novy Borch.

== Population ==
The village is monoethnic, inhabited by Rutulians.
