= Borch (village) =

Borch Burj
- Selo
- Location within Republic of Dagestan Location within Russia
- Country: Russia
- Region: Republic of Dagestan
- District: Rutulsky District
- Time zone: UTC+3:00

Borch (rut. Burj) is a village in the Rutulsky district of Dagestan, Russia. It is part of the Borch rural settlement.

== Geography ==
The village is located 12 km southeast of the village of Rutul.

== History ==
Borch (Burj) is an ancient Rutul village. In the 16th-17th centuries, the Khnovskoye (along with the village of Borch), free society, like other Rutulian Free Societies (Rutulian Magal), retained their independence and was governed by elders. Borch and Khnov never submitted to Rutul, as both were free societies. More than once, the people of Borch and Khnov defended its independence from Akhtypara. Borch, like Khnov, continued to be governed by its elected elders - kevkha (or kyokhdy in rut., meaning elder). Kevkhas were usually wealthy and influential Rutulians.

Starting in the early 19th century, the power of the Russian Empire began to assert itself in the free societies of the Samur Valley, but the Rutulians, along with other local peoples, resisted the tsarist troops. However, in 1812, representatives of the Samur Valley societies, including the Rutulians, signed an agreement with Major General Khatuntsev to come under the protection of Russia and agreed to pay tribute. These "free" societies were nominally considered under the control of the commandant of the city of Quba.

In 1839, Borch officially became part of the Russian Empire and was administratively included in the Samur District of the Dagestan Region. By 1886, Borch had a population of 2,290 people and approximately 850 households. Since 1928, it has been part of the Rutulsky district.

In the 1970s, about 60 households from Borch relocated to the Babayurtovsky district to the kutan of the state farm "50 Years of the DASSR," eventually forming the village of Novy Borch.

Today, only about 17 people live in Borch; the historical village remains in ruins. In the past, however, it was a beautiful village located in the center of alpine meadows.

== Population ==
The population of Borch consists of Rutulians. According to the 2010 census, 17 people live in the village. Most of the former population relocated to the village of Novy Borch, located on the plain in the Babayurtovsky district of Dagestan.
