= Khlyut =

Khlyut Хлют Хъулидар
- Selo
- Location within Republic of Dagestan Location within Russia
- Coordinates: 41°29′N 47°31′E
- Country: Russia
- Region: Republic of Dagestan
- District: Rutulsky District
- Time zone: UTC+3:00

Khlyut (Russian: Хлют; Lezgian: Хъулидар) is a rural locality (a selo) and the administrative centre of Khlyutskoye Rural Settlement, Rutulsky District, Republic of Dagestan, Russia. Population: 2,069 (2010 census); 2,032 (2002 census); 1,304 (1989 Soviet census). There are 18 streets.

== Geography ==
Khlyut is located 139 km northeast of Derbent, 10 km southeast of Rutul (the district's administrative centre) by road. Zrykh is the nearest rural locality.

== Nationalities ==
Lezgins live there.
