= Vrush =

Vrush Вруш Вырыш
- Selo
- Location within Republic of Dagestan Location within Russia
- Coordinates: 41°38′N 47°18′E
- Country: Russia
- Region: Republic of Dagestan
- District: Rutulsky District
- Time zone: UTC+3:00

Vrush (Russian: Вруш; Rutul: Вырыш) is a rural locality (a selo) in Luchekskoye Rural Settlement, Rutulsky District, Republic of Dagestan, Russia. Population: 32 (2010 census); 58 (2002 census);

== Geography ==
It is located 14 km northwest of Rutul, on the left bank of the Vrushmeri River. Luchek is the nearest rural locality.

== Nationalities ==
Rutul people live there.
