= Mukhakh, Republic of Dagestan =

Mukhakh Мухах
- Selo
- Location within Republic of Dagestan Location within Russia
- Coordinates: 41°42′N 46°59′E
- Country: Russia
- Region: Republic of Dagestan
- District: Rutulsky District
- Time zone: UTC+3:00

Mukhakh (Russian: Мухах) is a rural locality (a selo) in Kalyalskoye Rural Settlement, Rutulsky District, Republic of Dagestan, Russia. Population: 233 (2010 census); 158 (2002 census); 119 (1989 Soviet census). There are 3 streets.

== Geography ==
Mukhakh is located 40 km northwest of Rutul (the district's administrative centre) by road.
