= Hacıməmmədli =

Hacıməmmədli or Gadzhymamedli or Gadzhi-Mamedli may refer to:

- Hacıməmmədli, Agdam, Azerbaijan
- Hacıməmmədli, Jalilabad, Azerbaijan
