= Syugut =

Syugut Сюгут
- Selo
- Location within Republic of Dagestan Location within Russia
- Coordinates: 41°39′N 47°07′E
- Country: Russia
- Region: Republic of Dagestan
- District: Rutulsky District
- Time zone: UTC+3:00

Syugut (Russian: Сюгут) is a rural locality (a selo) in Tsakhurskoye Rural Settlement, Rutulsky District, Republic of Dagestan, Russia. Population: 167 (2010 census); 117 (2002 census); 77 (1989 Soviet census). There is 1 street.

== Geography ==
Syugut is located on the Samur river, 38 km northwest of Rutul (the district's administrative centre) by road. Muslakh and Tsakhur are the nearest rural localities.

== Nationalities ==
Tsakhurs live there.
