= Verkhny Katrukh =

Verkhny Katrukh Верхний Катрух
- Selo
- Location within Republic of Dagestan Location within Russia
- Coordinates: 41°44′N 47°13′E
- Country: Russia
- Region: Republic of Dagestan
- District: Rutulsky District
- Time zone: UTC+3:00

Verkhny Katrukh (Russian: Верхний Катрух) is a rural locality (a selo) in Rutulsky District, Republic of Dagestan, Russia. Population: 391 (2021 census); 461 (2002 census); 369 (1989 Soviet census). There are 3 streets.

== Geography ==
It is located 29 km northwest of Rutul.

== Nationalities ==
Laks live there.
