= Muslakh =

Muslakh Муслах
- Selo
- Location within Republic of Dagestan Location within Russia
- Coordinates: 41°39′N 47°06′E
- Country: Russia
- Region: Republic of Dagestan
- District: Rutulsky District
- Time zone: UTC+3:00

Muslakh (Russian: Муслах) is a rural locality (a selo) in Rutulsky District, Republic of Dagestan, Russia. Population: 424 (2021 census); 784 (2002 census); 496 (1989 Soviet census). There are 3 streets.

== Geography ==
Muslakh is located on the Main Caucasian ridge, between Samur and Kayana Rivers, 42 km northwest of Rutul (the district's administrative centre) by road. Mishlesh and Tsakhur are the nearest rural localities.

== Nationalities ==
Tsakhur people live in this locality.

== Famous residents ==
- Yakhya Ferzaliev (Hero of Socialist Labor)
