= Kalyal =

Kalyal Кальял
- Selo
- Location within Republic of Dagestan Location within Russia
- Coordinates: 41°41′N 47°00′E
- Country: Russia
- Region: Republic of Dagestan
- District: Rutulsky District
- Time zone: UTC+3:00

Kalyal (Russian: Кальял) is a rural locality (a selo) and the administrative centre of Kalyalskoye Rural Settlement, Rutulsky District, Republic of Dagestan, Russia. Population: 399 (2010 census); 348 (2002 census); 289 (1989 Soviet census).

== Geography ==
It is located 39 km northwest of Rutul.

== Nationalities ==
Tsakhur people live there.
