= Aran, Republic of Dagestan =

Aran Аран Вахый
- Selo
- Location within Republic of Dagestan Location within Russia
- Coordinates: 41°40′N 47°14′E
- Country: Russia
- Region: Republic of Dagestan
- District: Rutulsky District
- Time zone: UTC+3:00

Aran (Russian: Аран; Rutul: Вахый) is a rural locality (a selo) in Ikhrekskoye Rural Settlement, Rutulsky District, Republic of Dagestan, Russia. Population: 365 (2010 census); 333 (2002 census); There are 2 streets.

== Geography ==
Aran is located 21 km northwest of Rutul (the district's administrative centre) by road. Dzhilikhur and Tsudik are the nearest rural localities.

== Nationalities ==
Rutul people live there.
