= Kiche, Republic of Dagestan =

Kiche Киче Хьичед
- Selo
- Location within Republic of Dagestan Location within Russia
- Coordinates: 41°31′N 47°28′E
- Country: Russia
- Region: Republic of Dagestan
- District: Rutulsky District
- Time zone: UTC+3:00

Kiche (Russian: Киче; Rutul: Хьичед) is a rural locality (a selo) in Rutulskoye Rural Settlement, Rutulsky District, Republic of Dagestan, Russia. Population: 441 (2010 census); 363 (2002 census); 296 (1989 Soviet census). There is 1 street.

== Geography ==
Kiche is located on the left bank of the Samur river, 5 km east of Rutul (the district's administrative centre) by road. Khlyut and Zrykh are the nearest rural localities.

== Nationalities ==
Rutuls live there.

== Famous residents ==
- K. O. Gadzhiyev (People's teacher of the DASSR and Azerbaijan SSR, holder of the Order of Lenin)
- Saidmagomed Guseynov (Member of the Union of Writers of Russia, member of the Union of Journalists of Russia)
