= Khiyakh =

Khiyakh Хиях
- Selo
- Location within Republic of Dagestan Location within Russia
- Coordinates: 41°38′N 47°09′E
- Country: Russia
- Region: Republic of Dagestan
- District: Rutulsky District
- Time zone: UTC+3:00

Khiyakh (Russian: Хиях) is a rural locality (a selo) in Tsakhurskoye Rural Settlement, Rutulsky District, Republic of Dagestan, Russia. Population: 56 (2010 census); 51 (2002 census); 45 (1989 Soviet census). There is 1 street.

== Geography ==
Khiyakh is located on the Samur river, 34 km northwest of Rutul (the district's administrative centre) by road. Tsakhur and Gelmets are the nearest rural localities.

== Nationalities ==
Tsakhurs live there.

== Famous residents ==
- Shakhban Mamedov (Minister of Agriculture of the DASSR)
