= Ottal =

Ottal Оттал
- Selo
- Location within Republic of Dagestan Location within Russia
- Coordinates: 41°40′N 47°00′E
- Country: Russia
- Region: Republic of Dagestan
- District: Rutulsky District
- Time zone: UTC+3:00

Ottal (Russian: Оттал) is a rural locality (a selo) in Kalyalskoye Rural Settlement, Rutulsky District, Republic of Dagestan, Russia. Population: 400 (2010 census); 356 (2002 census); 128 (1989 Soviet census). There are 2 streets.

== Geography ==
Ottal is located 48 km northwest of Rutul (the district's administrative centre) by road. Mishlesh and Muslakh are the nearest rural localities.

== Nationalities ==
Tsakhur people live there.
