= Kina, Republic of Dagestan =

Kina Кина Къинед
- Selo
- Location within Republic of Dagestan Location within Russia
- Coordinates: 41°37′N 47°15′E
- Country: Russia
- Region: Republic of Dagestan
- District: Rutulsky District
- Time zone: UTC+3:00

Kina (Russian: Кина; Rutul: Къинед) is a rural locality (a selo) in Rutulsky District, Republic of Dagestan, Russia. Population: 566 (2021 census); 979 (2002 census); 503 (1989 Soviet census). There are 5 streets.

== Geography ==
Kina is located 20 km northwest of Rutul (the district's administrative centre) by road. Dzhilikhur and Tsudik are the nearest rural localities.

== Nationalities ==
Rutul people live there.
