= Kurdul =

Kurdul Курдул Курдул-Лек
- Selo
- Location within Republic of Dagestan Location within Russia
- Coordinates: 41°34′N 47°10′E
- Country: Russia
- Region: Republic of Dagestan
- District: Rutulsky District
- Time zone: UTC+3:00

Kurdul (Russian: Курдул; Tsakhur: Курдул-Лек) is a rural locality (a selo) in Gelmetsinskoye Rural Settlement, Rutulsky District, Republic of Dagestan, Russia. Population: 267 (2010 census); 216 (2002 census); 182 (1989 Soviet census). There is 1 street.

== Geography ==
Kurdul is located 37 km northwest of Rutul (the district's administrative centre) by road. Gelmets and Mikik are the nearest rural localities.

== Nationalities ==
Tsakhur people live there.
