= Luchek =

Luchek Russian: Лучек Rutul: Лычек (Lychek)
- Selo
- Location within Republic of Dagestan Location within Russia
- Coordinates: 41°36′N 47°18′E
- Country: Russia
- Region: Republic of Dagestan
- District: Rutulsky District
- Time zone: UTC+3:00

Luchek (Russian: Лучек; Rutul: Лычек (Lychek)) is a rural locality (a selo) and the administrative centre of Luchekskoye Rural Settlement, Rutulsky District, Republic of Dagestan, Russia. Population: 758 (2002 census); .

Luchek (like the village Rutul) is the historical and political center of the Rutulian state formations. In 1895, Luchek became the Center of the Luchek Wilayah of the Samur okrug (district). In 1926 - the Center of the Luchek Section of the Samur district.

== Geography ==
Luchek is located at the height of 1679m, 13 km northwest of Rutul (the district's administrative centre) by road.

== History ==
In all known medieval documents about the Rutul Federation, Luchek is mentioned as one of the key settlements of this state.

== Nationalities ==
Rutulians live there.
