= Horch (surname) =

Horch is a surname. Notable people with the surname include:

- August Horch (1868–1951), German engineer and automobile pioneer
- Frank Horch (born 1948), German politician
- Kyle Horch (born 1964), American classical saxophonist

== See also ==
- Borch
