= Kufa, Republic of Dagestan =

Kufa Куфа Гухьвадад
- Selo
- Location within Republic of Dagestan Location within Russia
- Coordinates: 41°33′N 47°22′E
- Country: Russia
- Region: Republic of Dagestan
- District: Rutulsky District
- Time zone: UTC+3:00

Kufa (Russian: Куфа; Rutul: Гухьвадад) is a rural locality (a selo) in Rutulskoye Rural Settlement, Rutulsky District, Republic of Dagestan, Russia. Population: 312 (2010 census); 279 (2002 census); 190 (1989 Soviet census). There is 1 street.

== Geography ==
Kufa is located in the valley of the Samur river, 8 km northwest of Rutul (the district's administrative centre) by road. Kala and Amsar are the nearest rural localities.

== Nationalities ==
Rutuls live there.
