= Jilikhur =

Jilikhur Джилихур
- Selo
- Location within Republic of Dagestan Location within Russia
- Coordinates: 41°39′N 47°15′E
- Country: Russia
- Region: Republic of Dagestan
- District: Rutulsky District
- Time zone: UTC+3:00

Jilikhur (Russian: Джилихур) is a rural locality (a selo) and the administrative centre of Myukhrekskoye Rural Settlement, Rutulsky District, Republic of Dagestan, Russia. Population: 743 (2010 census); 826 (2002 census); 480 (1989 Soviet census). There are 5 streets.

== Geography ==
Jilikhur is located in the valley of the Kara-Samur river, 22 km northwest of Rutul (the district's administrative centre) by road. Tsudik and Aran are the nearest rural localities.

== Nationalities ==
Rutuls live there.
