= Shinaz =

Shinaz Synazyr
- Location within Republic of Dagestan Location within Russia
- Country: Russia
- Federal subject: Republic of Dagestan
- District: Rutulsky District

Population (2010)
  - Total: 1,320

Shinaz (rut. Synazyr) is a village in the Rutulsky District of Dagestan, Russia.

== Name ==
The origin of the village of Shinaz dates back to ancient times. Local residents call the village Synazyr, meaning synas, or "one." According to some researchers, Shinaz is derived from a Persian word meaning "recognizing" (in reference to Islamic doctrine). Another theory suggests that the name Shinaz comes from the word natsI, meaning "reed." Long ago, small hamlets were scattered across what is now the territory of the village, including Shugad, Mykhadiy, Tsygyrdikhal, MukhulI, and Leylu-kala. These small settlements were connected to one another, and some legends also mention the settlements of Kyulih and Ikalyb.

== History ==
Shinaz is one of Dagestan's ancient villages, known since the Middle Ages for its crafts, agriculture, and livestock breeding. Written sources, preserved cultural monuments, agricultural customs, ancient tools, and traditional crafts all attest to the village's historical significance. The most important and original account of Shinaz from the 13th century comes from the famous geographer and cosmographer Zakariya al-Qazvini (1203–1283). He wrote:

"Shinaz is a town in the country of Lakzan, on the edge of a very high mountain. There is no other road to it than along the top of the mountain. Anyone who wants to get here takes a stick in his hands and slowly descends, so that the wind does not knock him off his feet due to its strength. They experience an extremely harsh cold for seven months. They grow a type of grain called as-sult and have a variety of mountain apples. The inhabitants are kind, peaceful, hospitable to the poor, and cordial to strangers. Their craft includes making weapons, such as chain mail (dir), armor (dzhavashin), and other types of weapons."

== Population ==
The population of Shinaz consists of Rutulians. The village has five quarters, in which representatives of around 60 patronymic groups live.

A mosque, built in the 11th century, still operates in the village.

== Economy ==
In 1907, the Shinaz community collectively owned approximately 20,000 sheep and goats.

== Notable people ==
♦ Ismail Efendi (d. after 1780) — astronomer.
