= Gasret Aliev =

Hero of the Soviet Union

Personal details
- Born: 14 December 1922 village Khnov, Samur district Mountain Republic
- Died: 28 February 1981 (aged 58) Makhachkala, Dagestan ASSR, USSR
- Awards: Hero of the Soviet Union

Military service
- Branch/service: Red Army
- Years of service: 1942–1946
- Rank: Lieutenant
- Battles/wars: World War II; Eastern Front; Battle of the Dnieper

Gasret Agaevich Aliev (Russian: Газрет Агаевич Алиев, romanized: Gazret Agayevich Aliyev) (14 December 1922 – 28 February 1981) was a Soviet soldier and a Hero of the Soviet Union during World War II. Aliev was awarded the title for his actions during the Battle of the Dnieper, where he reportedly killed 80 German soldiers.

== Biography ==
Aliev was born in the village of Khnov in the Samursky Okrug of the Dagestan Autonomous Soviet Socialist Republic on 14 December 1922 to a peasant family of Rutul ethnic background. He did not complete his high school education and instead worked on a collective farm.

In 1942 Aliev was drafted into the Red Army. That same year he was sent to fight on the frontlines of World War II. He became a scout in the 496th Separate Reconnaissance Company of the 236th Rifle Division. He fought in the Battle of the Caucasus.

Aliev fought in the Battle of the Dnieper. He received the Order of the Red Star on 10 September. On the night of 26 September 1943, Aliev was in a reconnaissance group of 19 soldiers under the command of lieutenant Sergey Shpakovsky (made a Hero of the Soviet Union by the same decree as Aliev) which crossed the Dnieper River around the village of Soshinovka (Dnepropetrovsk area). Through that night and the next day, the group repulsed eleven counterattacks by German troops. Aliev killed more than 80 German soldiers in hand-to-hand combat and by fire from his machine gun. In later battles for the expansion of the bridgehead, Aliev provided important military intelligence about the German forces.

Gasret Aliev was given the title of Hero of Soviet Union along with the Order of Lenin and the Gold Star medal by the decree of the Presidium of the Supreme Soviet of 1 November 1943 "For the successful Dnieper River crossing, strong securing of a foothold on the western bank of the Dnieper River, and both the heroism and courage shown".

In 1944 Gasret Aliev graduated from courses for junior lieutenants and returned to the front. He retired in 1946 with the rank of lieutenant and lived and worked in Makhachkala. He died on 28 February 1981 in Makhachkala and was buried there.

== Awards ==
Aliev was received the following awards.

- Hero of Soviet Union
- Order of Lenin
- Order of the Red Star
- Medal "For the Defence of the Caucasus"
- Medal "For the Victory over Germany in the Great Patriotic War 1941–1945"
- Jubilee Medal "Twenty Years of Victory in the Great Patriotic War 1941–1945"
- Jubilee Medal "Thirty Years of Victory in the Great Patriotic War 1941–1945"
