= Khnyukh =

Khnyukh Хнюх Хыӏныӏхъ
- Selo
- Location within Republic of Dagestan Location within Russia
- Coordinates: 41°34′N 47°25′E
- Country: Russia
- Region: Republic of Dagestan
- District: Rutulsky District
- Time zone: UTC+3:00

Khnyukh (Russian: Хнюх; Rutul: Хыӏныӏхъ) is a rural locality (a selo) in Rutulskoye Rural Settlement, Rutulsky District, Republic of Dagestan, Russia. Population: 61 (2010 census); 129 (2002 census); 45 (1989 Soviet census). There is 1 street.

== Geography ==
It is located on the southern slope of the Samur ridge, 5 km north of Rutul.

== Nationalities ==
Rutuls live there.
