= Kufa (disambiguation) =

Kufa is a city in Iraq.

Kufa may also refer to:

- Kufa, a rural locality in Dagestan, Russia
- Kufa University, Iraqi governmental university
- Great Mosque of Kufa, one of the earliest mosques in Islam, located in Kufa, Iraq
- Kufa FC, an Iraqi football team based in Kufa, Iraq
- Kufa District, a district of the Najaf Governorate, Iraq
- Kuphar, a Babylonian or Iraqi coracle
- KUFA, a radio station (104.3 FM) licensed to serve Hebronville, Texas, United States
- KüfA ("Kuchen für Alle"), a Volxkuche or leftist Soup kitchen in Germany or The Netherlands.

== See also ==
- Kufah (disambiguation)
- Kufic writing
- Kufic recitation
- Kufra
