= Amsar (disambiguation) =

Amsar can refer to:

- Amsar, refer to civilised cities and large areas in which houses, markets, schools and other public facilities are located.
- Amsar, Republic of Dagestan, village in Dagestan.
- AMSAR
