= Terborgh =

Terborgh is a surname. Notable people with the surname include:

- F.C. Terborgh (1902–1981), Dutch author
- John Terborgh (born 1936), American professor of environmental science

== See also ==
- Ter Borch, another Dutch surname pronounced the same way
