= Həsənxanlı =

- Location within Azerbaijan Location within Karabakh Economic Region
- Coordinates: 39°59′29.8″N 47°08′00.2″E
- Country: Azerbaijan
- Rayon: Agdam
- Time zone: UTC+4 (AZT)
  - Summer (DST): UTC+5 (AZT)

Həsənxanlı (Note: Transliterated as Hasankhanly or Hasankhnali) is a village in the municipality of Əfətli in the Agdam District of Azerbaijan.
