= Ikhrek =

Ikhrek Ихрек Йирек
- Selo
- Location within Republic of Dagestan Location within Russia
- Coordinates: 41°41′N 47°12′E
- Country: Russia
- Region: Republic of Dagestan
- District: Rutulsky District
- Time zone: UTC+3:00

Ikhrek (Russian: Ихрек; Rutul: Йирек) is a rural locality (a selo) and the administrative centre of Ikhrekskoye Rural Settlement, Rutulsky District, Republic of Dagestan, Russia. Population: 2,050 (2010 census); 2,314 (2002 census); 1,905 (1989 Soviet census). There are 7 streets.

== Geography ==
Ikhrek is located 28 km northwest of Rutul (the district's administrative centre) by road. Aran and Nizhny Katrukh are the nearest rural localities.

== Nationalities ==
Rutul people live there.
