= Ikhrek Rajab =

Rutul poet (d. 1760)

- Born: 1680
- Died: 1760 (aged 79–80)
- Occupation: Poet
- Writing career
- Language: Azerbaijani

Ikhrek Rajab (Azerbaijani: İhrək rəcəb; b. Ikhrek, Safavid Shirvan, Safavid Empire – d. 1760) was a Rutul poet who wrote poems mainly in Azerbaijani Turkish.

== Life and creativity ==
The main part of Ikhrek Rajab's work consists of love poems. According to folk legends, he loved a girl named Huri, but the girl's father married off Huri to a rich man. Therefore, Rajab's poems dedicated to Huri formed the basis of his creativity.

“Söylərəm” (“I will say”), “Mənəm mən” (“This is me”), “Mən” (“I”) are among his famous poems. In them, the main place is occupied by the state of the lyrical hero, accompanied by sadness and melancholy. These poems are distinguished by the fact that they lack a clearly defined object - it seems to be dissolved in time and space. Accordingly, the relationship of the subject to the object is not emphasized. The main attention is focused on the subject himself.
