= Kufah =

Kufah may refer to:

- Ovophis okinavensis, a.k.a. the Okinawa pitviper, a venomous pitviper species found in the Ryukyu Islands of Japan
- Alternative English spelling for Kufa, a city in modern Iraq

== See also ==
- Kufa (disambiguation)
