= Şıxoba =

- Location within Azerbaijan Location within Shaki-Zagatala Economic Region
- Coordinates: 41°00′N 47°21′E
- Country: Azerbaijan
- Rayon: Shaki
- Municipality: Aydınbulaq
- Time zone: UTC+4 (AZT)
  - Summer (DST): UTC+5 (AZT)

Şıxoba (also, Shykhoba and Shykh-Obesy) is a village in the Shaki Rayon of Azerbaijan. The village forms part of the municipality of Aydınbulaq.
