= Ulfat Idlibi =

Ulfat Idlibi ألفت الادلبي
- إلفت عمر باشا الإدلبي (Ulfat Umar Pasha al-Idlibi)
- fair use image only
- Born: November 1912; Damascus, Syria
- Died: 21 March 2007 (aged 94); Paris, France
- Occupation: novelist
- Writing career
- Language: Arabic
- Notable work: "Damascus - the Smile of Sadness"

Ulfat Idlibi (Arabic: ألفت الادلبي (Ulfat al-Idlibi) or إلفة الإدلبي (Ilifat al-Idlibi); Rutul: Улфат Идлиби/Ulfat Idlibi) (November 1912, Damascus – 21 March 2007, Paris) was a Syrian novel writer. She wrote books that became best sellers in the Arabic-speaking world, such as Dimashq ya Basimat el Huzn (Damascus - the Smile of Sadness, 1980), which was translated into many languages and aired as Basimat al Huzn (TV series).

== Biography ==
Born in 1912, to a traditional Damascene family, she was married at the age of 17. She was affected by the French occupation of Syria (French Mandate, 1919), and educated herself by reading widely from the books in the library of her uncle, Kazem Dagestani, who was also an author.

Idlibi began to write and publish stories about the area of Damascus called Al-Salihiyah in 1954. Her books tell of strong women. She wrote about the Syrian resistance movement, especially regarding the injustice of the aggressor and people who were involved in a struggle for their lives, freedom and the independence of their country (which was already exhausted by rule of Ottoman Empire).

Later she became a lecturer and wrote novels and essays on the social position of women in the Middle East, as well as on the pressure they undergo and the suffering they endure. Idlibi emphasized the theme of women often spending time in their own, non-existent worlds.

She had a daughter and two sons. She spent the last decades of her life between Damascus and Paris, where she died in 2007.

== Damascus - the Smile of Sadness ==
This is the most famous novel by Idlibi, telling a story about a girl who grows up in times of nationwide chaos (1920s), caused by the French occupation. She becomes more conscious of her national identity, which is hardly supported by her family, who is conservative and does not allow Sabriya to leave the house except to go to school. The story tells of the injustices and deprivations she undergoes, caused both by the French occupiers and by her family, along with the loss of her beloved and her vow never to forget him. It's been read as left by Sabriyeh (main character) in her diary, found after her death.

== Bibliography ==
=== Novels ===
- "القرار الأخي" /"al-qarar al-akheer"/ (1947) - "the Last Decision"
- "قصص شامي" /"qisas shami"/ (1954) - "Levantine Stories"
- "وداعاً يا دمشق" /"uda'an ya dimashq"/ (1963) - "Goodbye, Damascus!"
- "يضحك الشيطان" /"youdHak ash-shaytan"/ (1974) - "The Laugh of the Devil"
- "نظرة في أدبنا الشعبي" /"natharat fi adabna sh'bia"/ (1974) - "Reflections on our Popular Literature"
- "عصي الدمع" /"'asi ad-domou3"/ (1976) - "Mutiny of Tears"
- "دمشق يا بسمة الحزن" /"dimashq ya basimat el huzn"/ (1981) - "Damascus - the Smile of Sadness"
- "نفحات دمشقي" /"nafaHat dimashqi"/ (1990) - "the Fragrances of Damascus"
- "حكاية جدي" /"Hekayat jddi"/ (1999) - "Story of My Grandfather"
