= Borch =

Borch can refer to:

== Places ==
- Borch, village in Dagestan.

== People ==
Borch is a surname. Notable people with the surname include:

- Elna Borch (1869–1950), Danish sculptor
- Fred Borch (born 1954), American military attorney
- Gaston Borch (1871–1926), French musician
- Martin Borch (1852–1937), Danish architect
- Ole Borch (1626–1690), Danish scientist

== See also ==
- Ter Borch
