= Khnov bilingual epitaph =

14th century stele found in Dagestan, Russia

The Khnov bilingual epitaph refers to a late 14th-century epitaph inscribed on a trapezoid-shaped headstone stele, which was discovered in the mountainous village of Khnov in Dagestan, Russia. The inscription consists of a six-line Arabic prose text dated Rajab 784 AH (September–October 1382 AD) followed by a four-line Persian metrical text containing the three dobayts from the Matlūb kull tālib treatise of Iranian poet Rashid al-Din Vatvat (died 1182/3). According to the Iranologist Grigol Beradze, the Khnov bilingual epitaph represents the "earliest dated Persian poetical inscription to be found so far in the North Caucasus".
