= Məmmədbağırlı =

Village in Aghdam District, Azerbaijan

Coordinates: 40°00′N 47°03′E

Məmmədbağırlı is a village in the municipality of Əfətli in the Agdam Rayon of Azerbaijan.
