= Amsar, Republic of Dagestan =

Amsar Амсар Амцурды
- Selo
- Location within Republic of Dagestan Location within Russia
- Coordinates: 41°36′N 47°19′E
- Country: Russia
- Region: Republic of Dagestan
- District: Rutulsky District
- Time zone: UTC+3:00

Amsar (Russian: Амсар; Rutul: Амцурды) is a rural locality (a selo) and the administrative centre of Amsarsky Selsoviet, Rutulsky District, Republic of Dagestan, Russia. Population: 460 (2010 census); 520 (2002 census); 384 (1989 Soviet census). There are 5 streets.

== Geography ==
Amsar is located 12 km northwest of Rutul village (the district's administrative centre) by road. Luchek and Shinaz are the nearest rural localities.

== Nationalities ==
Rutulians live there.
