= Qəhrəmanbəyli =

Village in Aghdam District, Azerbaijan

Coordinates: 40°01′N 47°07′E

Qəhrəmanbəyli is a village in the municipality of Əfətli in the Agdam Rayon of Azerbaijan.
