= Myukhrek =

Myukhrek Мюхрек Мыхыӏрек
- Selo
- Location within Republic of Dagestan Location within Russia
- Coordinates: 41°40′N 47°16′E
- Country: Russia
- Region: Republic of Dagestan
- District: Rutulsky District
- Time zone: UTC+3:00

Myukhrek (Russian: Мюхрек; Rutul: Мыхыӏрек) is a rural locality (a selo) in Myukhrekskoye Rural Settlement, Rutulsky District, Republic of Dagestan, Russia. Population: 193 (2010 census); 209 (2002 census); 357 (1989 Soviet census). There is 1 street.

== Geography ==
Myukhrek is located on the Samur ridge, 23 km northwest of Rutul (the district's administrative centre) by road. Tsudik and Dzhilikhur are the nearest rural localities.

== Nationalities ==
Rutuls live there.
