= Daşüz =

- Municipality
- Location within Azerbaijan Location within Shaki-Zagatala Economic Region
- Coordinates: 41°05′39″N 47°04′59″E
- Country: Azerbaijan
- Rayon: Shaki

Population
  - Total: 1,243
- Time zone: UTC+4 (AZT)
  - Summer (DST): UTC+5 (AZT)

Daşüz is a village and municipality in the Shaki Rayon of Azerbaijan. It has a population of 1,243.
