= Şorsu =

Village in Shaki Rayon, Azerbaijan

Coordinates: 41°09′30″N 46°59′30″E

Şorsu is a village and municipality in the Shaki Rayon of Azerbaijan. It has a population of 1,942.
