= Əfətli =

- Municipality
- Location within Azerbaijan Location within Karabakh Economic Region
- Coordinates: 40°01′29″N 47°06′43″E
- Country: Azerbaijan
- Rayon: Agdam

Population
  - Total: 2,322
- Time zone: UTC+4 (AZT)
  - Summer (DST): UTC+5 (AZT)

Əfətli (Afetli, or Meshadilyar) is a village and municipality in the Agdam District of Azerbaijan. It has a population of 2,322. The municipality consists of the villages of Əfətli, Hacıməmmədli, Məmmədbağırlı, Qəhrəmanbəyli, Həsənxanlı, İsalar, and Küdürlü.
