= Hacıməmmədli, Jalilabad =

Hacıməmmədli
- Municipality
- Location within Azerbaijan
- Coordinates: 39°14′N 48°23′E
- Country: Azerbaijan
- Rayon: Jalilabad

Population
  - Total: 325
- Time zone: UTC+4 (AZT)
  - Summer (DST): UTC+5 (AZT)

Hacıməmmədli (also, Gadzhymamedli and Gadzhi-Mamedli) is a village and municipality in the Jalilabad Rayon of Azerbaijan. It has a population of 325.
