= Məşədilər, Jalilabad =

Village and municipality in Jalilabad Rayon, Azerbaijan

Məşədilər is a village and municipality in the Jalilabad Rayon of Azerbaijan. It has a population of 432.
