= Rybalko, Republic of Dagestan =

Rybalko Рыбалко
- Selo
- Location within Republic of Dagestan Location within Russia
- Coordinates: 43°46′N 46°39′E
- Country: Russia
- Region: Republic of Dagestan
- District: Kizlyarsky District
- Time zone: UTC+3:00

Rybalko (Russian: Рыбалко) is a rural locality (a selo) in Krasnoarmeysky Selsoviet, Kizlyarsky District, Republic of Dagestan, Russia. The population was 1,787 as of 2010. There are 14 streets.

== Geography ==
Rybalko is located 13 km southwest of Kizlyar (the district's administrative centre) by road. Zarechnoye and Borozdinovskoye are the nearest rural localities.

== Nationalities ==
Avars, Rutuls, Laks, Lezgins, Dargins, Russians and Tabasarans live there.
