= Küdürlü, Agdam =

Village in Azerbaijan

Küdürlü is a village in the municipality of Əfətli in the Agdam Rayon of Azerbaijan.
