= Hacıməmmədli, Agdam =

Hacıməmmədli
- Location within Azerbaijan Location within Karabakh Economic Region
- Coordinates: 40°01′00.2″N 47°05′04.9″E
- Country: Azerbaijan
- Rayon: Agdam
- Time zone: UTC+4 (AZT)
  - Summer (DST): UTC+5 (AZT)

Hacıməmmədli is a village in the municipality of Əfətli in the Agdam District of Azerbaijan.
