= Küdürlü, Qakh =

Küdürlü is a municipality, and a village in Qakh District of Qakh Rayon of Azerbaijan, it has a population of 354 peoples.
