= Aydınbulaq =

- Municipality
- Location within Azerbaijan Location within Shaki-Zagatala Economic Region
- Coordinates: 40°59′30″N 47°16′58″E
- Country: Azerbaijan
- Rayon: Shaki

Population
  - Total: 885
- Time zone: UTC+4 (AZT)
  - Summer (DST): UTC+5 (AZT)

Aydınbulaq (also, Aydynbulag and Aydynbulak) is a village and municipality in the Shaki Rayon of Azerbaijan. It has a population of 885. The municipality consists of the villages of Aydınbulaq and Şıxoba.
