= Meshadilyar =

- Location within Azerbaijan
- Coordinates: 39°14′43″N 48°16′03″E
- Country: Azerbaijan
- Rayon: Neftchala
- Time zone: UTC+4 (AZT)
  - Summer (DST): UTC+5 (AZT)

Meshadilyar (also, Mashadlyar, Meshadili, and Meshadlyar) is a village in the Neftchala Rayon of Azerbaijan.
