= Ter Borch =

Ter Borch is a surname. The most notable person with that name was the Dutch painter Gerard ter Borch (1617–1681).

Other people with the surname ter Borch include:

- Gerard ter Borch the Elder (1583–1662), Dutch painter
- Gesina ter Borch (1633–1690), Dutch artist
- Menzo ter Borch (1896–1981), Dutch trade unionist
- Moses ter Borch (1645–1667), Dutch artist
