= Küdürlü, Shaki =

Küdürlü
- Municipality
- Location within Azerbaijan Location within Shaki-Zagatala Economic Region
- Coordinates: 41°05′03″N 47°07′13″E
- Country: Azerbaijan
- Rayon: Shaki

Population
  - Total: 547
- Time zone: UTC+4 (AZT)
  - Summer (DST): UTC+5 (AZT)

Küdürlü (also, Kyudyurlyu) is a village and municipality in the Shaki Rayon of Azerbaijan. It has a population of 547.
