= Şin =

- Municipality
- Location within Azerbaijan Location within Shaki-Zagatala Economic Region
- Coordinates: 41°21′25″N 47°06′53″E
- Country: Azerbaijan
- Rayon: Shaki

Population
  - Total: 1,932
- Time zone: UTC+4 (AZT)
  - Summer (DST): UTC+5 (AZT)

Şin (also, Shin) is a village and municipality in the Shaki Rayon of Azerbaijan. It has a population of 1,932.
