= Khnov =

Khnov Хнов Хин
- Selo
- Location within Republic of Dagestan Location within Russia
- Coordinates: 41°22′N 47°26′E
- Country: Russia
- Region: Republic of Dagestan
- District: Akhtynsky District
- Time zone: UTC+3:00

Khnov (Russian: Хнов; Rutul: Хин) is a rural locality (a selo) in Akhtynsky District, Republic of Dagestan, Russia. The population was 2,059 as of 2010.

== Geography ==
Khnov is located 34 km southwest of Akhty (the district's administrative centre) by road. Gdym is the nearest rural locality.

== See also ==
- Khnov bilingual epitaph
