= Selo, Russia =

Selo (Russian: Село) is the name of several rural localities in Russia.

== Modern localities ==
=== Arkhangelsk Oblast ===
As of 2014, three rural localities in Arkhangelsk Oblast bear this name:

Arkhangelsk Oblast distribution map
Distribution of the inhabited localities called Selo in Arkhangelsk Oblast.

- Selo, Kargopolsky District, Arkhangelsk Oblast, a village in Khotenovsky Selsoviet of Kargopolsky District; 61°09′N 38°49′E
- Selo, Nyandomsky District, Arkhangelsk Oblast, a village in Limsky Selsoviet of Nyandomsky District; 61°53′N 40°53′E
- Selo, Verkhnetoyemsky District, Arkhangelsk Oblast, a village in Verkhnetoyemsky Selsoviet of Verkhnetoyemsky District; 62°14′N 44°58′E

=== Kostroma Oblast ===
As of 2014, one rural locality in Kostroma Oblast bears this name:

Kostroma Oblast location map
Location of Selo in Kostroma Oblast

- Selo, Kostroma Oblast, a village in Pankratovskoye Settlement of Chukhlomsky District; 59°13′N 43°29′E

=== Leningrad Oblast ===
As of 2014, one rural locality in Leningrad Oblast bears this name:

Leningrad Oblast location map
Location of Selo in Leningrad Oblast

- Selo, Leningrad Oblast, a village in Kalitinskoye Settlement Municipal Formation of Volosovsky District; 59°26′N 29°45′E

=== Novgorod Oblast ===
As of 2014, one rural locality in Novgorod Oblast bears this name:

- Selo, Novgorod Oblast, a village in Dolgovskoye Settlement of Moshenskoy District

=== Oryol Oblast ===
As of 2014, one rural locality in Oryol Oblast bears this name:

Oryol Oblast location map
Location of Selo in Oryol Oblast

- Selo, Oryol Oblast, a settlement in Voronetsky Selsoviet of Trosnyansky District; 52°27′N 36°03′E

=== Smolensk Oblast ===
As of 2014, one rural locality in Smolensk Oblast bears this name:

- Selo, Smolensk Oblast, a village in Dobrinskoye Rural Settlement of Dukhovshchinsky District

=== Vologda Oblast ===
As of 2014, three rural localities in Vologda Oblast bear this name:

- Selo, Kalininsky Selsoviet, Totemsky District, Vologda Oblast, a village in Kalininsky Selsoviet of Totemsky District
- Selo, Verkhnetolshmensky Selsoviet, Totemsky District, Vologda Oblast, a village in Verkhnetolshmensky Selsoviet of Totemsky District
- Selo, Vozhegodsky District, Vologda Oblast, a village in Maryinsky Selsoviet of Vozhegodsky District

== Alternative names ==
- Selo, alternative name of Kazennoye Selo, a village in Samoylovskoye Settlement Municipal Formation of Boksitogorsky District in Leningrad Oblast; 59°39′N 34°20′E

== See also ==
- Selo, a general term for a type of a rural locality in Russia
