= Rutul language =

Language belonging to the Lezgic group of the Northeast Caucasian language family

Rutul
- мыхаӀбишды чӀел
- Pronunciation: [mɨχaˤbiʃdɨ t͡ʃʼɛl]
- Native to: North Caucasus, Azerbaijan
- Region: Southern Dagestan, Russian–Azerbaijani border
- Ethnicity: Rutulians
- Native speakers: 33,100 (2020 census, in Russia) (undated figure of 17000 in Azerbaijan)
- Language family: Northeast Caucasian: Lezgic; Samur; Western Samur; Rutul
- Writing system: Cyrillic

Official status
- Official language in: Russia: Dagestan

Language codes
- ISO 639-3: rut
- Glottolog: rutu1240
- ELP: Rutul
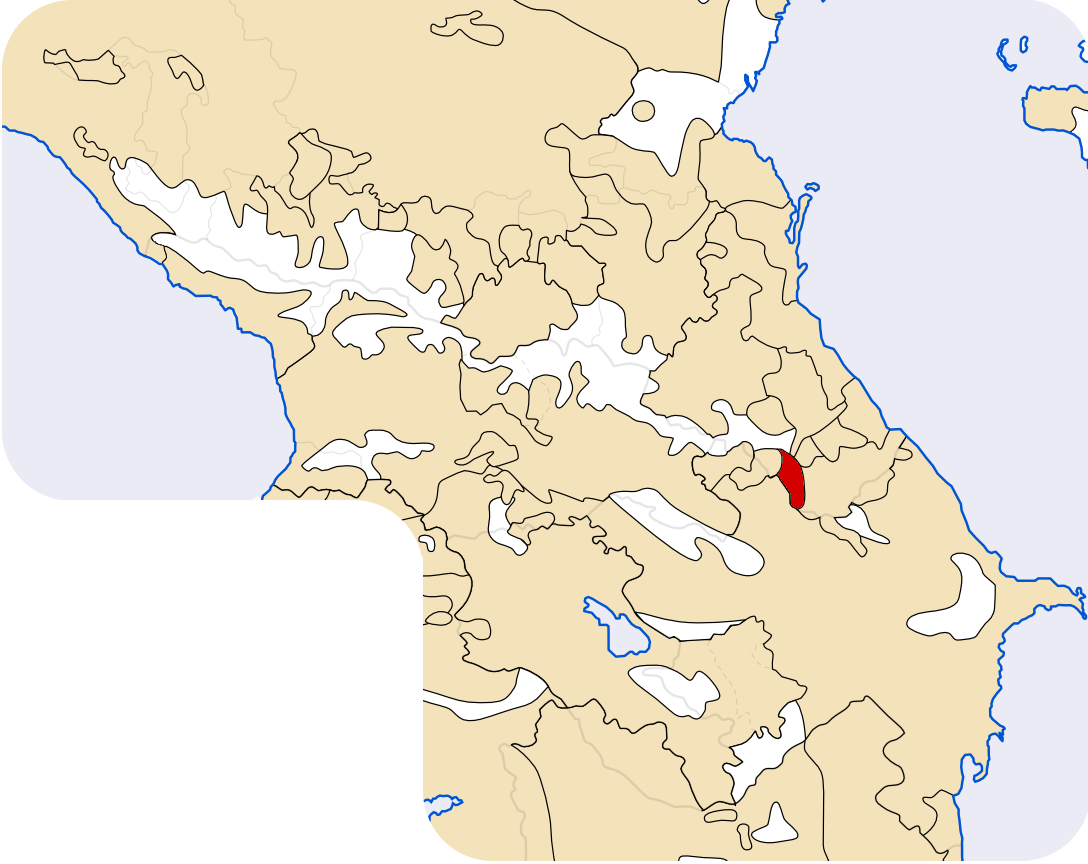
- Rutulians in the Caucasus

- Rutulian is classified as Definitely Endangered by the UNESCO Atlas of the World's Languages in Danger (2010)

Rutul or Rutulian is a language spoken by the Rutulians, an ethnic group living in Dagestan (Russia) and some parts of Azerbaijan. It is spoken by 30,000 people in Dagestan (2010 census) and 17,000 (no date) in Azerbaijan. The word Rutul derives from the name of a Dagestani village where speakers of this language make up the majority.

Rutulian is endangered in Russia and classified as "definitely endangered" by UNESCO's Atlas of the World's Languages in Danger.

== Classification ==
The Rutulian language includes 4 main dialects: Mukhadian, Shinazian, Ikhrek-Myukhrekian, Borch-Khnovian.

Rutulian belongs to the Lezgic group (Samur group) of the Northeast Caucasian language family. The Rutulians call their language МыхаӀбишды чӀел, Myhabishdy chel.

=== Related languages ===
Among the languages of the Lezgic group, Tsakhur appears to be the closest relative of Rutulian. Other than these two, there are seven more languages in the Lezgic group, namely: Lezgian, Tabasaran, Aghul, Budukh, Kryts, Udi and Archi.

== History ==
Rutulian was not a written language until the writing system for it (based on Cyrillic) was developed in 1990. A Latin alphabet was developed in 2013 based on the Shin-Shorsu dialect. Speakers are often bilingual or multilingual, having a good command of the Azeri, Lezgian and/or Russian languages. The literary version of the language remains in the process of development. In the Rutul-populated regions of southern Russia, Rutulian is taught in primary schools (grades 1 to 4).

== Phonology ==
=== Vowels ===
Vowel phonemes
	Front		Central	Back
Close	i iː	y	ɨ ɨː	u uː
Mid	ɛ eː			
Open	æ			ɑ ɑː

=== Consonants ===
Consonant phonemes
		Labial	Dental		Alveolar		Palatal	Velar		Uvular		Pharyn- geal	Glottal
		Labial	plain	lab.	plain	lab.	Palatal	plain	lab.	plain	lab.	Pharyn- geal	Glottal
Nasal		m	n										
Plosive	voiced	b	d					ɡ	ɡʷ	ɢ	ɢʷ		
Plosive	voiceless	p	t					k	kʷ	q	qʷ	ʡ	ʔ
Plosive	ejective	pʼ	tʼ					kʼ	kʷʼ	qʼ	qʷʼ		
Affricate	voiced		d͡z		d͡ʒ	d͡ʒʷ							
Affricate	voiceless		t͡s	t͡sʷ	t͡ʃ	t͡ʃʷ							
Affricate	ejective		t͡sʼ	t͡sʷʼ	t͡ʃʼ	t͡ʃʷʼ							
Fricative	voiceless	(f)	s	sʷ	ʃ	ʃʷ		x	xʷ	χ	χʷ	ħ	h
Fricative	voiced		z		(ʒ)			ɣ		ʁ	ʁʷ	ʢ	
Trill					r							ʜ	
Approximant		w	l				j						

== Writing ==
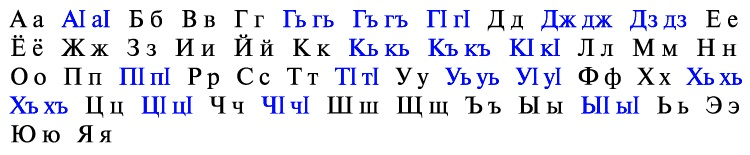
Rutulian alphabet

Before the Russian Revolution, the Rutulians used the Arabic script. In the Arabic script (Ajami), as a written source, the text of the song in the Ikhrek dialect of the Rutulian language of the ashug of the 18th century Kur Rajaba is known. In 1913, Adolf Dirr created a Cyrillic-based alphabet for Rutulian. The modern Rutulian alphabet based on the Cyrillic alphabet was introduced in 1990. Arabic was used, among other things, when writing scientific papers. Turkish (Azerbaijani) was also used in everyday life. The founders of the Rutulian script and the compilers of the Rutulian alphabet based on the Cyrillic alphabet are S.M. Makhmudova, K.E. Jamalov, G.K. Ibragimov. In 1992 prof. Makhmudova S. M. and Jamalov K. E. published an ABC book in Rutulian for grade 1 students - “Alifba: 1-classad kitab”. In this edition, in addition to the previously adopted alphabet, the digraph Дз дз was introduced. After that, three more school textbooks of the Rutulian language were published: Мыхаӏд чӏел (grades 2 and 4), Recipes by S. M. Makhmudova and Рутул чӏел by E. Ismailova. In 2012-2013 a textbook on the Rutul language for universities was published: Grammar of the Rutulian language, Part 1-2 by S. M. Makhmudova. In 2006, Dzhamalov K. E. and Semedov S. A. released a Rutulian-Russian dictionary (Ihrek dialect) In this edition, the letter Ь ь was excluded from the alphabet, but Аь аь was included. In 2019, the Rutulian-Russian dictionary by A. S. Alisultanov and T. A. Suleimanova was published.

The Rutulians have a rich literature dating back to the 11th century with the name of Zeinab Hinavi, an Albanian poet. The classic of Rutulian, Lezgin and Azerbaijani poetry is the eighteenth-century ashug Kur-Rajab. In the 20th and 21st centuries, Rutulian literature was developed and developed by Jameseb Salarov, Nurakhmed Ramazanov, Magomed Ulileev, Musa Makhmudov, Ezerchi, Yusif Medzhidov, Sakit Kurbanov, Shafi Ibragimov, Veysal Cherkezov and others. In 2008, the first generalizing work "Rutulian literature" was published, which provides information about Rutulian writers, poets and ashugs.

The writing system for the Rutulians of Azerbaijan was developed in 2013 based on the dialect of the village of Şin. When developing this alphabet, it was proposed to write the pharyngealized vowel [ɨˤ] with the letter ı;. The authors of the alphabet also proposed a more logically consistent system for denoting velar consonants, but it was rejected as not coinciding with the system adopted in the Azerbaijani alphabet. The Rutulian alphabet in Azerbaijan includes the following letters:

Latin-based Rutulian Alphabet
A a	AӀ aӀ	B b	C c	Ç ç	Çʼ çʼ	D d	E e	Ә ә	F f
G g	Gʼ gʼ	Gh gh	Ğ ğ	H h	X x	Xh xh	I ı	IӀ ıӀ	İ i
J j	K k	Kʼ kʼ	Q q	Qʼ qʼ	Qh qh	L l	M m	N n	O o
P p	Pʼ pʼ	R r	S s	Ş ş	T t	Tʼ tʼ	Ts ts	Tsʼ tsʼ	U u
Ü ü	UӀ uӀ	V v	Y y	Z z	ʼ

Cyrillic-based Rutulian Alphabet
А а	АӀ аӀ	Б б	В в	Г г	Гъ гъ	Гь гь	ГӀ гӀ	Д д	Е е	Ё ё
Дж дж	Ж ж	Дз дз	З з	И и	Й й	К к	Къ къ	Кь кь	КӀ кӀ	Л л
М м	Н н	О о	П п	ПӀ пӀ	Р р	С с	Т т	ТӀ тӀ	У у	Уь уь
УӀ уӀ	Ф ф	Х х	Хъ хъ	Хь хь	Ц ц	ЦӀ цӀ	Ч ч	ЧӀ чӀ	Ш ш	Щ щ
Ъ ъ	Ы ы	ЫӀ ыӀ	Ь ь	Э э	Ю ю	Я я

=== Comparison chart ===
IPA	Cyrillic	Latin	IPA	Cyrillic	Latin
ɑ	A a	A a	o	О о	O o
ɑˤ	АӀ аӀ	AӀ aӀ	p	П п	P p
æ	Аь аь	Ə ə	p'	ПӀ пӀ	P' p'
b	Б б	B b	r	Р р	R r
ʋ	В в	V v	s	С с	S s
g	Г г	G g	t	Т т	T t
h	Гь гь	H h	t'	ТӀ тӀ	T' t'
ʁ	Гъ гъ	Ğ ğ	u	У у	U u
ɣ	ГӀ гӀ	Gh gh	y	Уь уь	Ü ü
d	Д д	D d	uˤ	УӀ уӀ	UӀ uӀ
d͡ʒ	Дж дж	C c	f	Ф ф	F f
e	Е е	E e	χ	Х х	X x
ʒ	Ж ж	J j	x	Хь хь	Xh xh
z	З з	Z z	q	Хъ хъ	Qh qh
i	И и	İ i	t͡s	Ц ц	Ts ts
j	Й й	Y y	t͡s'	ЦӀ цӀ	Ts' ts'
k	К к	K k	t͡ʃ	Ч ч	Ç ç
q'	Кь кь	Q' q'	t͡ʃ'	ЧӀ чӀ	Ç' ç'
ɢ	Къ къ	Q q	ʃ	Ш ш	Ş ş
k'	КӀ кӀ	K' k'	ʔ	Ъ ъ	'
l	Л л	L l	ɨ	Ы ы	I ı
m	М м	M m	ɨˤ	ЫӀ ыӀ	IӀ ıӀ
n	Н н	N n			

== Grammar ==
=== Case ===
Typical of Northeast Caucasian languages, Rutul has an ergative-absolutive case system, with 6 grammatical cases and a series of 12 spatial cases.

The grammatical cases are the absolutive (sometimes called the nominative), ergative, genitive, dative, comparative, and comitative. Cases are realized as suffixes, either attached directly to the noun or to the oblique stem. The oblique stem (which typically coincides with the ergative case) is used as a base on which to add additional inflectional suffixes.

Case Endings in Rutul
Nominative	-Ø
Ergative	-a, -e, -ra, -re
Genitive	-d, -di
Dative	-z
Comparative	-qaʔ
Comitative	-xʷan

The absolutive case is primarily used to denote the subject of an intransitive verb, the patient of a transitive verb, or the stimulus of a perception verb.

vɨ za-χda qa-cu-rdiš
you(SG).ABS I.OBL-AD PV-listen.PF-AOR.NEG
"You didn't listen to me"

The ergative case is used to mark agents of transitive verbs, a causing force, or the mobile participant of the verb 'to fill'.

χal nur-di-re a-c’ɨ-ri
house light-OBL-ERG PV-fill.PF-AOR
"The house filled with light"

The genitive case primarily denotes possession, although it can be used to describe other relations, like the material of an object. The genitive suffix is identical to the attributive suffix.

va za-s naχčir-mɨ-d q’ɨrbɨmɨ-d χal si-xaʔ
you(SG).ERG I.OBL-DAT beast-PL.OBL-GEN bone-PL.OBL-GEN house PV-put.IMPER
"Build me a house (made) of animal bones"

The comparative case handles comparisons, and can also be used for exchanged items.

vɨ sɨv-a-qaʔ juˤq’-aˤ vi-ʔi
you(SG).NOM mountain-OBL-COMPAR heavy-PRED A-COP
"You are heavier than a mountain"

mi rɨš je xidɨ-qaʔ rɨ-vɨlc’a-ra a-d ri-ʔi.
PROX girl we water.OBL-COMPAR F-give.IPF-CV be_in.ATTR F-COP
"We are giving this girl in exchange for water"

== See also ==
- Rutulians
- Northeast Caucasian languages
- Languages of Azerbaijan
