= Rutul (rural locality) =

Rural locality in Dagestan, Russia

Rutul Mykha, МыхІа
- Village
- Location in Dagestan Rutul (Russia)
- Country: Russia
- Federal subject: Republic of Dagestan
- District: Rutulsky District

Population (2010)
  - Total: 4,132
- Postal code: 368700

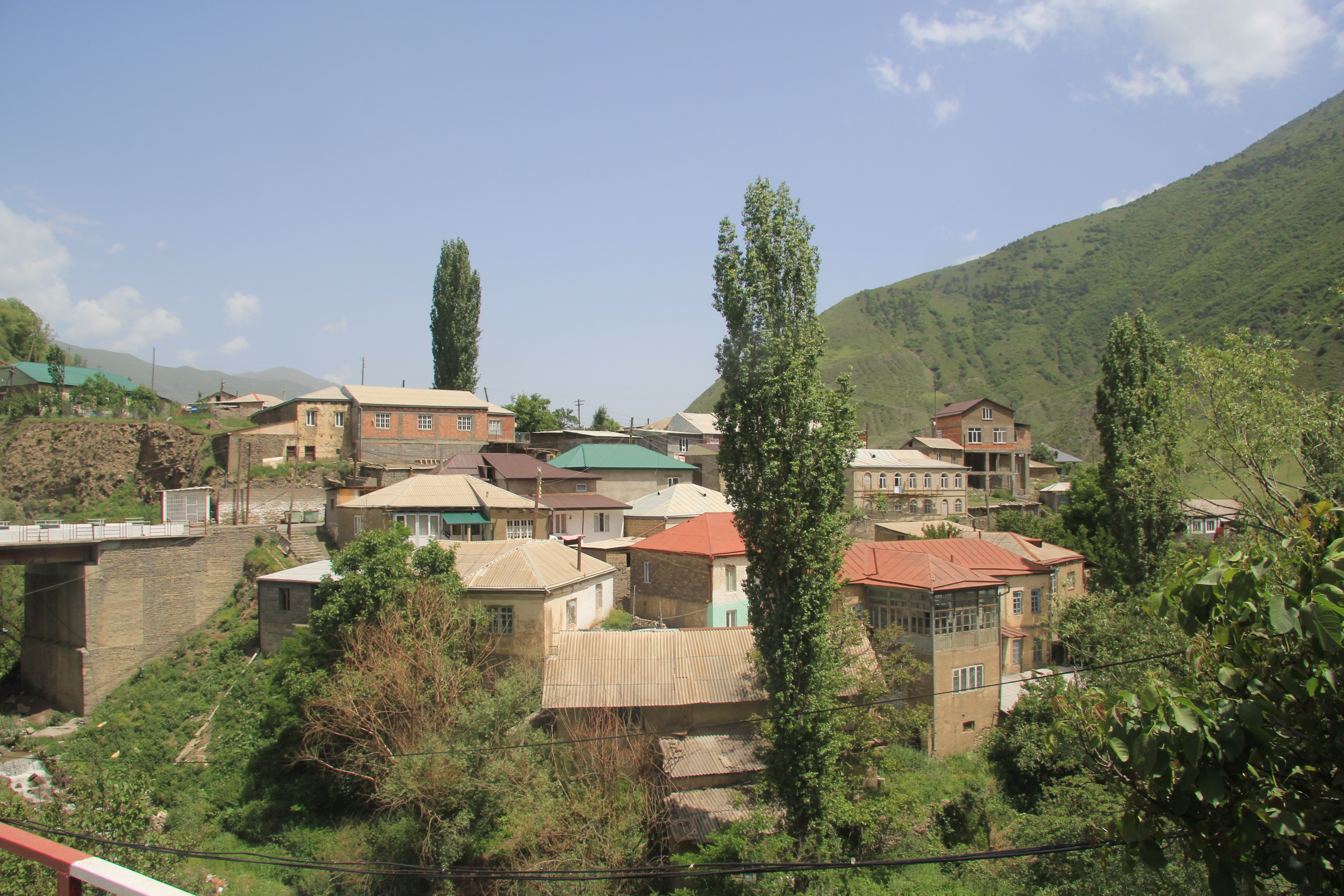
A historic quarter in a mountainous village of Rutul

Rutul (Rutul: МыхІа, Рутул; Russian: Рутул) is a rural locality (a selo) and the administrative center of Rutulsky District of the Republic of Dagestan, Russia. Population: 4,132 (2010 census); 3,958 (2002 census); 2,957 (1989 Soviet census).

== Nationalities ==
Rutulians live there.
