= Rutulsky District =

Rutulsky District Рутульский район (Russian)
- District
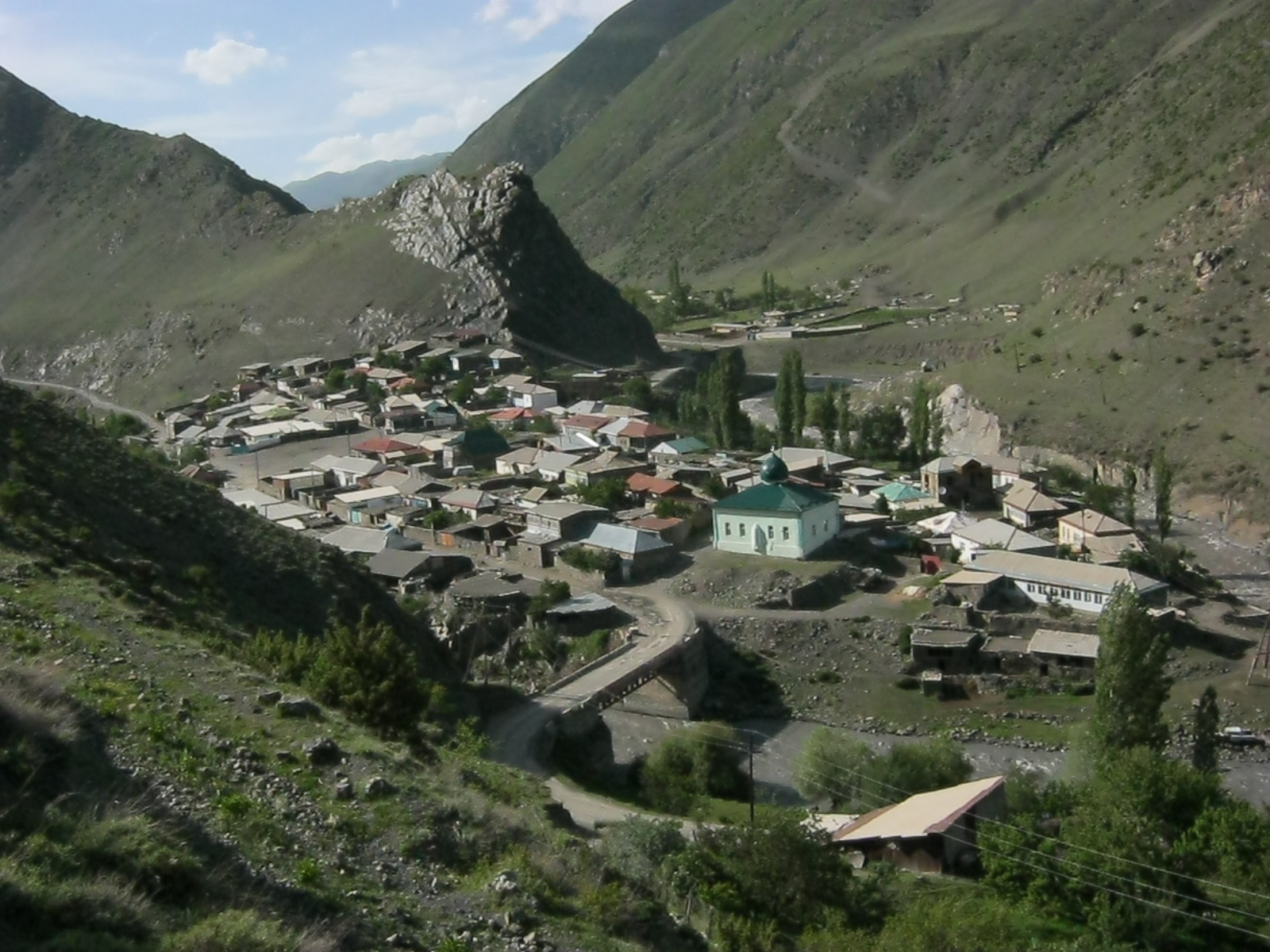
- Village Luchek in Rutulsky District

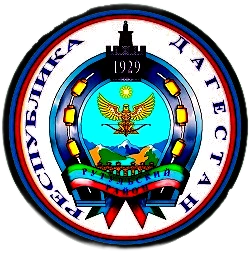
- Coat of arms
- Location of Rutulsky District in the Republic of Dagestan
- Coordinates: 41°32′N 47°25′E
- Country: Russia
- Federal subject: Republic of Dagestan
- Established: 1929
- Administrative center: Rutul

Area
  - Total: 2,188 km^{2} (845 sq mi)

Population (2010 Census)
  - Total: 22,926
  - Density: 10.48/km^{2} (27.14/sq mi)
  - Urban: 0%
  - Rural: 100%

Administrative structure
  - Administrative divisions: 11 Selsoviets
  - Inhabited localities: 40 rural localities

Municipal structure
  - Municipally incorporated as: Rutulsky Municipal District
  - Municipal divisions: 0 urban settlements, 17 rural settlements
- Time zone: UTC+3 (MSK)
- OKTMO ID: 82642000
- Website: http://www.mo-rutul.ru

Population of Rutulsky District
- 2010 Census: 22,926
- 2002 Census: 23,503
- 1989 Census: 16,387
- 1979 Census: 18,989

Rutulsky District (Russian: Руту́льский райо́н) is an administrative and municipal district (raion), one of the forty-one in the Republic of Dagestan, Russia. It is located in the south of the republic. The area of the district is 2,188 square kilometers (845 sq mi). Its administrative center is the rural locality (a selo) of Rutul. As of the 2010 Census, the total population of the district was 22,926, with the population of Rutul accounting for 18.0% of that number.

== Administrative and municipal status ==
Within the framework of administrative divisions, Rutulsky District is one of the forty-one in the Republic of Dagestan. The district is divided into eleven selsoviets which comprise forty rural localities. As a municipal division, the district is incorporated as Rutulsky Municipal District. Its eleven selsoviets are incorporated as seventeen rural settlements within the municipal district. The selo of Rutul serves as the administrative center of both the administrative and municipal district.

== Demographics ==
Ethnic composition (according to the 2010 Census)

- Rutulians 58.16%
- Tsakhurs 23.01%
- Lezgins 9.32%
- Laks 3.77%
- Avars 2.71%
- Azerbaijanis 1.56%
- Russians 0.13%
- Others 0.13%
